= List of Mortal Kombat: Legacy episodes =

Mortal Kombat: Legacy is an American web series anthology that aired on Machinima.com's YouTube channel. The first episode was uploaded on April 11, 2011, with subsequent episodes uploaded each following week until the final episode, which premiered two months later at Comic Con 2011. The series was created by Kevin Tancharoen, based upon the Mortal Kombat video game series created by Ed Boon and John Tobias. Two seasons of the show have aired.

The show came about following the positive reaction from fans to a short film Tancharoen made with his own money entitled Mortal Kombat: Rebirth that took a small part of the franchise's story and told it in a real-world scenario without the supernatural elements common to the series. After submitting the film to Warner Bros., Tancharoen received the green light to produce the web series, written by himself and Spartacus writers Todd and Aaron Helbing, with Tancharoen directing.

The series is set before the events of the first game and tells the background stories of the characters who featured in its story, focusing on the relationship between each other, and revealing the reasons of some for attending the upcoming tenth Mortal Kombat tournament. There is little continuity between episodes, with some set ages before the first game, while others are set shortly before. Each episode is devoted to the story of a specific character or characters.

A total of nine episodes of Mortal Kombat: Legacy were produced for the first season, the last of which aired on July 24, 2011. At present, the videos are available online, and the entire first & second season are available on Blu-ray in all regions.

== List of seasons ==
Season	Episodes	Originally released		Blu-ray release date (Region A/B/C)
Season	Episodes	First released	Last released	Blu-ray release date (Region A/B/C)
1	9	April 11, 2011	July 24, 2011	November 8, 2011
2	10	September 26, 2013		TBA

== Seasons ==
=== Season 1 (2011) ===
Season one aired from April 11, 2011 to July 24, 2011. The original airdates (U.S.) are listed here for each episode.

Season one begins with the conflict between Jax and Sonya of the Deacon City Police Department and Kano of the Black Dragon clan. Also explored are the ancient day Shirai Ryu and Lin Kuei clans, the modern day Lin Kuei Cyber Initiative, the rise and fall of Hollywood movie star Johnny Cage, a realistic interpretation of Raiden – the God of Thunder and Lightning, and the family of Emperor Shao Kahn in the realms of Outworld and Edenia. Season I demonstrates little continuity between each episode, other than the Cyrax and Sektor episode taking place shortly before the Jax, Sonya and Kano episodes, revealing that Kano provided the means and parts to construct the Lin Kuei's Cyber Initiative shortly before Jax and Sonya moved in on him.

No. overall	No. in season	Title	Directed by	Written by	Original release date
1	1	"Jax, Sonya & Kano - Part 1"	Kevin Tancharoen	Kevin Tancharoen & Todd Helbing & Aaron Helbing	April 11, 2011
In the Black Dragon's warehouse, Kano supervises his cartel as they prepare to ship stolen robotics under the codename "Cyber Initiative" to an undisclosed location. Sonya Blade has infiltrated the warehouse and transmits her report to Jax. Inside Deacon City police headquarters, Kurtis Stryker briefs his police squad on Sonya's transmission, their past difficulties apprehending Kano and that the Black Dragon stole robotics from the Department of Defense. After a minor disagreement about whether to follow protocol and wait for Sonya to confirm her findings, Jax and Stryker decide to infiltrate the warehouse. It is then revealed that Sonya had been captured shortly before transmitting her report to Jax and that Kano delayed its transmission for two days, allowing the shipment to take place. Unaware that the report they received is two days old, Jax and Stryker's men head to the warehouse where Kano is planning an ambush. When the police arrive, a shoot-out ensues between them and Kano's men, who are using advanced weaponry. Jax separates from the group to search for Sonya but finds Kano instead, who engages a fistfight. Kano picks up a grenade launcher during the fight and accidentally fires off a round. The blast separates Kano and Jax. Sonya is chained to the ceiling just below where the grenade exploded. The blast is enough to weaken her bonds, allowing her to escape.
2	2	"Jax, Sonya & Kano - Part 2"	Kevin Tancharoen	Kevin Tancharoen & Todd Helbing & Aaron Helbing	April 18, 2011
Jax and Kano awake from the explosion while the gunfight between Stryker's men and the Black Dragon clan continues. Sonya sneaks up behind three of Kano's men and kills them. She then enters a security control room. Upon observing Kano running from Jax on a closed-circuit monitor, she flees to find them. Jax, still demanding to know where Sonya is being held, engages another fist fight with Kano, who continues to taunt him with threats against Sonya. Jax severely beats Kano, dislodging his eyeball. Sonya arrives to see Kano unconscious and Jax resting. She takes out one final henchman but not before he tosses a grenade towards her partner. Jax rises and runs towards Sonya to keep her safe from the blast. A week later, Sonya wakes in a hospital intensive care unit. Stryker tells her that the Black Dragon got to Kano before his team could and Jax sustained serious injuries in the process. Damage to his arms required him to be sent to a special medical facility at the Department of Defense where they "have a plan". Following the beating, a backroom surgical team prepares Kano for an emergency eye procedure, removing the remnants of skull around his right eye socket and rebuilding it with metal plates. A mechanical arm completes the procedure, inserting a cybernetic eye. As Kano awakens, his new eye glows red.
3	3	"Johnny Cage"	Kevin Tancharoen	Kevin Tancharoen & Todd Helbing & Aaron Helbing	April 25, 2011
A mock introduction of an episode of The Electric Playground features host Victor Lucas profiling fallen action star Johnny Cage. The show summarizes his life from his early martial arts days and worldwide fame to his many arrests and stalled acting career, using home video footage and interviews with friends and associates from his personal and professional life. In the present day, Johnny is pitching a new crime-fighting reality show called You Got Caged to two TV executives. They are both unimpressed, spouting off clichéd arguments about their target demographic and their reluctance for martial arts and reality shows. But an insistent Cage earns himself a second chance to convince them that he and the show are bankable. Three weeks later and Johnny has re-shot a mature trailer for You Got Caged with a grittier, realistic style of violence. The executives are once again uninterested, this time cutting the entire project and releasing Johnny from his network contract. A dejected Cage leaves the meeting and walks onto the set of a new production, overhearing the same executives pitching his exact idea to a new female action star under the name You Got Saved. Enraged, Johnny attacks one of the executives and several security guards. Then suddenly, time literally freezes around him, leaving everyone else in a state of suspended animation. One other figure remains invulnerable to the anomaly. Shang Tsung approaches Cage and offers him "a way out of everything".
4	4	"Kitana & Mileena - Part 1"	Kevin Tancharoen	Kevin Tancharoen & Todd Helbing & Aaron Helbing	May 1, 2011
A narrator tells the story of the downfall of Edenia and its royal family: A long time ago, Edenia's peaceful realm was invaded by Outworld after it lost ten consecutive Mortal Kombat tournaments. Its lush, vibrant kingdom was reduced to a flaming wasteland, its people slaughtered by the Outworld Tarkatans under their leader, Baraka, himself under the orders of Outworld Emperor, Shao Kahn. Edenia's king, Jerrod, reluctantly abandoned his wife and daughter and ran from Baraka's approaching warriors. Jerrod's wife, Queen Sindel, cradled their child as the castle was attacked by the Tarkatans. A knight, posing as the king, tried valiantly to protect his queen and her daughter but Baraka killed him before they could escape. Shao Kahn became the new Edenian ruler, taking Sindel and her daughter, Kitana, as his own. The real King Jerrod never returned to Edenia as it once was. But Shao Kahn was frustrated that Sindel and Kitana would never return the love that he truly felt for them, so he enlisted Shang Tsung to create an identical daughter who would. Baby Kitana was cloned, her twin sister, Mileena, a half-human half-Tarkatan. Afraid Kahn would corrupt Kitana's soul, Sindel took her own life so that her soul could merge with her daughter's, and Kahn began raising Kitana and her twin sister to believe in his cause. Years later, Mileena grew jealous of her sister's close relationship with their father, unable to control the violence and anger of her Tarkatan heritage. As they grew older, Kahn trained them in the art of combat, both possessing immense skill and a maturing ability to deceive.
5	5	"Kitana & Mileena - Part 2"	Kevin Tancharoen	Kevin Tancharoen & Todd Helbing & Aaron Helbing	May 8, 2011
Despite Mileena's growing resentment towards her more favored sister, the siblings maintained a close relationship, working as Shao Kahn's personal assassins to keep Edenia safe from attack. He entrusted them to finish his takeover of Edenia by hunting down and killing those who opposed his rule or could expose the truth of the invasion to Kitana. The twins also found and killed all of Jerrod's imposters, as they scoured Edenia for the former king. All of their searching left Kitana with lingering questions she could not answer. But on a cold night in the Edenian forests, the sisters found King Jerrod in hiding. Before Mileena callously killed him, he revealed to Kitana that she looked very much like her mother, and that he was her father. Now fueled by the knowledge that her life with Shao Kahn may have been a lie, she returned to Jerrod's abandoned castle, left as it was when Baraka invaded many years earlier. Within the castle walls, her mother's soul presented Kitana with visions of what she had witnessed before ending her life: Jerrod cradling baby Kitana, Shang Tsung taking Kitana's blood to create Mileena, Baraka killing Jerrod's knight, and Queen Sindel herself taking her own life. Now that her real father's dying words were confirmed in her eyes, and as Shao Kahn revealed plans to merge Earthrealm with Outworld, Kitana silently harbored a desire for vengeance against the Emperor, who remained unaware of her recent discovery.
6	6	"Raiden"	Kevin Tancharoen	Kevin Tancharoen & Todd Helbing & Aaron Helbing	May 15, 2011
At night, an electrical storm appears to teleport a man into the yard of a psychiatric institution, leaving him electrified in a dirt crater. The next morning, a patient named Blue finds the man, who wakes suddenly and vomits blue blood. Blue claims ownership of the man as three guards confront them and incapacitate them after a brief struggle. The man is held within the Valleyview Rehabilitation Center for three months in a solitary room. Security vision captures his growing frustration and impatience. He is periodically treated with sedatives and restrained in a strait jacket. In a session with Doctor Gadsen, it is revealed that the man refers to himself as Lord Raiden, God of Thunder and protector of earth. Raiden is demanding to be set free so that he can participate in the Mortal Kombat tournament and stop Shao Kahn invading. The doctor refuses, administering a lobotomy to curtail his disruptive behavior. Blue also encourages Raiden to stay, but he wants her to escape with him. After another violent outburst where he demands to be released, Raiden is lobotomized again. Blue enters after the surgery, locking the doctors out. Under Raiden's order, she reluctantly stabs him in the chest with a surgical tool, vaporizing him in a burst of electricity and blood. In another electrical burst, Raiden appears, this time in the backstreets of Chinatown. He steals a man's conical hat and walks away. The episode opened with a message from director Kevin Tancharoen on the continuity, presumably used to avoid negative reaction from fans.
7	7	"Scorpion & Sub-Zero - Part 1"	Kevin Tancharoen	Kevin Tancharoen & Todd Helbing & Aaron Helbing	May 22, 2011
The head of a rival clan narrates the story of the Shirai Ryu – a once proud clan whose leader, General Hanzo Hasashi, mastered the kunai weapon for combat, becoming known as The Scorpion. On a winter's day spent playing with his child, Hanzo learns that his son, Jubei, longs to train with his father's weapon, to join the Shirai Ryu, and to become general. Hanzo is reluctant to let his son be a part of this life but chooses to begin training Jubei anyway. At dinner, Hanzo's wife, Kana, asks about the progress regarding the shogun's arrival to their village. She is surprised to learn that their son has not prepared a ceremonial song, as he is busy training with his father. Hanzo insists Jubei sing for the shogun, and while their son practices, Kana explains that she does not want their son to join the Shirai Ryu. Before they could finish, messengers on behalf of Lord Ryuk interrupt to request Hanzo's presence, as the shogun will be arriving early. Dressed as a ninja and carrying his famed kunai weapon, Scorpion sets off on his journey alone, tracked by unknown assailants. Trekking through the forest, he finds the shogun dead, his entire body frozen in a chair, left behind so that Hanzo would find him. Bi Han, also known as Sub-Zero, approaches and attacks Scorpion, admitting to the shogun's assassination as a way to lure the general of the now defenseless Shirai Ryu away from his village. Meanwhile, his family left alone, Hanzo's home is infiltrated, and his wife is taken.
8	8	"Scorpion & Sub-Zero - Part 2"	Kevin Tancharoen	Kevin Tancharoen & Todd Helbing & Aaron Helbing	May 29, 2011
Jubei watches as his mother is held captive by Sub Zero's men, contemplating attacking them with one of his father's kunai. After engaging Scorpion in a fist fight, Sub-Zero tries unsuccessfully to freeze his enemy, allowing Scorpion to impale him with his kunai and land a final blow. Upon realizing the danger his family is in, Scorpion begins running back to his village, unaware that Sub-Zero has woken. Hanzo returns to the village and is met with the strewn bodies of his people. He is distraught to see his wife's body completely frozen, her arm cracking upon being touched. Not far away, lies his son, also motionless. As Hanzo drops his guard and sits in grief, he is impaled by Sub-Zero. Hanzo's enemy leaves one final taunt about the end of the Shirai Ryu, and an insult that his family rot in the afterlife. As Sub-Zero stands, Hanzo's body quickly begins to freeze solid. Shang Tsung arrives and questions whether Scorpion can be made to fight for them. Before answering, Sub-Zero morphs into his true self, revealing Quan Chi has been impersonating him all along. Quan Chi is convinced his plan to fool Scorpion into thinking Sub-Zero, his sworn enemy, killed his family is enough to ensure the ninja's allegiance to Shang Tsung and himself. He asks Scorpion to fight on the side of the Netherrealm in the upcoming Mortal Kombat tournament, in return for life as a spectre and the chance to enact vengeance on the man who killed his clan, his family and himself. Given the power to awaken, Scorpion emerges from the ice in flames, reminding the aligned sorcerers that his name is not Hanzo Hasashi, but Scorpion.
9	9	"Cyrax & Sektor"	Kevin Tancharoen	Kevin Tancharoen & Todd Helbing & Aaron Helbing	June 6, 2011
The Lin Kuei clan has trained the most feared ninja assassins for over 800 years by kidnapping children as new recruits. Complete submission to the Grand Master was demanded, disobedience not tolerated. Two of its assassins are en route to a warehouse to take part in the Lin Kuei Grand Master's new Cyber Initiative: Cyrax, against his will, convinced they are headed for death; and Sektor, believing the new initiative is the future of the clan. Inside the warehouse, doctors watch alongside the Grand Master and a pre-cybernetic eyed Kano as two henchmen approach Cyrax and Sektor. The assassins easily account for the henchmen, revealed to be digital projections of robots. Cyrax vents his frustration by removing the robot's head and throwing it at a security camera. The Grand Master gives the command to begin Phase One. Unit LK-4D4 (Cyrax) and Unit LK-9T9 (Sektor) are strapped down, electrical wires and grease protruding from dissections in their bodies. Developments in speed and outer casing advancements precede weaponization and emotional recalibration, a procedure to maintain the subjects' memories while severing emotional connections to them, preventing visceral responses in favor of cerebral ones. Cyrax continues to struggle, displaying anger and discomfort. By far the most advanced of the cybernetic models to date, the ninjas are outfitted with their robotic casings ready for Phase Two: a practical test against a previous model, Unit LK-1V1. Unit LK-1V1, Project Hydro, is initialized alongside Project Cyrax and Project Sektor as the doctors observe. During the fight, Hydro manages to overpower his more advanced counterparts. When working together, however, Cyrax and Sektor disengage Hydro. Cyrax, previously showing the most resistance to the cybernetic automation, is the one to initiate a merciless fatality by decapitating Hydro and the human within. Project Sektor and Project Cyrax are complete and the Grand Master gives the command to begin automating the entire clan.

=== Season 2: II (2013) ===
Filming for the second season concluded in December 2012. Ten episodes were filmed, with a trailer released at the Streamy Awards on February 17, 2013. All the episodes were released on September 26, 2013.

No. overall	No. in season	Title	Directed by	Written by	Original release date
10	1	"Liu Kang and Kung Lao reunite in Macau"	Kevin Tancharoen	Kevin Tancharoen & Josh Baizer & Marshall Johnson	September 26, 2013
"Down and out Liu Kang gets into a drunken fight in a seedy Macau bar with the local gangsters. Liu Kang is not happy when Kung Lao comes to his rescue and the two have a tumultuous reunion."
11	2	"The Cause of Liu Kangs fall is Revealed"	Kevin Tancharoen	Kevin Tancharoen & Josh Baizer & Marshall Johnson	September 26, 2013
"We flash back to what has brought Liu Kang to such a low point in his life... we watch as his fiancée is murdered before his eyes. Back in the present, we watch as Kung Lao leaves his Macao monastery and approaches the portal to the Mortal Kombat tournament."
12	3	"Kenshi's Origin Story Begins"	Kevin Tancharoen	Kevin Tancharoen & Josh Baizer & Marshall Johnson	September 26, 2013
"We watch as the Earthrealm and Outworld warriors appear at the Mortal Kombat tournament island. Raiden greets the Earthrealm warriors. We also flashback to feudal Japan for the beginning of Kenshi's origin story."
13	4	"Kenshi Encounters Ermac in Past and Present"	Kevin Tancharoen	Kevin Tancharoen & Josh Baizer & Marshall Johnson	September 26, 2013
"We continue with Kenshi's origin story in feudal Japan and watch as he is blinded in his first fight with Ermac. In the present, Kenshi battles Ermac in the tournament, finally defeating him."
14	5	"Kitana and Mileena Arrive at the Tournament"	Kevin Tancharoen	Kevin Tancharoen & Josh Baizer & Marshall Johnson	September 26, 2013
"We flash back to Kitana and Mileena getting their orders to enter the tournament... Kitana is uneasy about the truth of her past. She flashes back to a moment in Season 1 where she mistakenly murders her biological father. In the present, the sisters argue as they track Johnny Cage through the forest. They surprise him and chase him down."
15	6	"Johnny Cage is Recruited"	Kevin Tancharoen	Kevin Tancharoen & Josh Baizer & Marshall Johnson	September 26, 2013
"We flash back to how Johnny Cage was recruited to the tournament by Raiden... as he sits in a jail cell. In the present, we watch as Johnny fights for his life against Mileena and Kitana. He is only able to escape when the sisters turn on one another."
16	7	"Scorpion and Sub-Zero Form a Truce"	Kevin Tancharoen	Kevin Tancharoen & Josh Baizer & Marshall Johnson	September 26, 2013
"Flashback to feudal Japan, where Scorpion, his wife and his son are waylaid on the road by Sub Zero's angry younger brother. Scorpion is forced to kill him to protect his family. In the aftermath, Scorpion and Sub Zero attempt to renew a childhood friendship and form a truce between their warring clans."
17	8	"Scorpion and Sub-Zero Battle"	Kevin Tancharoen	Kevin Tancharoen & Josh Baizer & Marshall Johnson & Oren Uziel	September 26, 2013
"We flash back to feudal Japan and reference the moments in Season 1 where Scorpion's family is seemingly murdered by Sub Zero and his clan. In the present, Scorpion searches the tournament field for Sub Zero and exacts his revenge."
18	9	"Liu Kang is Approached to Fight for Outworld"	Kevin Tancharoen	Kevin Tancharoen & Josh Baizer & Marshall Johnson	September 26, 2013
"Flashback to the weeks before Liu Kang is recruited into the tournament. We see that Liu Kang has become a hitman as he murders Russian mobsters in a seedy motel. After the job is done, Liu Kang is visited by Shang Tsung, who recruits him to join the tournament... however this time, he'll fight on the darkside of the Outworld warriors."
19	10	"Liu Kang and Kung Lao Meet on the Battlefield"	Kevin Tancharoen	Kevin Tancharoen & Josh Baizer & Marshall Johnson	September 26, 2013
"In the present, Stryker treats Johnny Cage's wounds when Liu Kang comes upon them and fights them both. Kung Lao appears, shocked that his old friend is here and that he is fighting with the warriors of Outworld."
