= Reptile (Mortal Kombat) =

Mortal Kombat character

- Mortal Kombat character
- Reptile in Mortal Kombat X (2015)
- First appearance: Mortal Kombat (1992)
- Last appearance: Mortal Kombat 1 (2023)
- Created by: Ed Boon; John Tobias
- Designed by: Various: John Tobias (MK, MKII, UMK3, MK4); Steve Beran (MK:D); Mark Lappin (MK:SM, MK:A); Atomhawk Design (MK9)
- Voiced by: Various: Ed Boon (MK); Dan Forden (MK4); Tom Taylorson (MK:A); Marz Timms (MK9); Steve Blum (MKX); Andrew Morgado (MK1)
- Portrayed by: Keith Cooke (Mortal Kombat 1995 film); Jon Valera (Mortal Kombat: Conquest); Richard Dorton (Mortal Kombat: Rebirth)
- Motion capture: Daniel Pesina (MK, MKII); John Turk (UMK3, MK4); Tom Taylorson (MK:A); Marz Timms (MK9); Steven Blum (MKX); Andrew Morgado (MK1); Sean Welsh (MK1); Noah Fleder/Chris McClure (MK1)

In-universe information
- Full name: Syzoth (MKII, UMK3, MK4, MK:DA, MK:A, MK9, MKX, MK1)
- Species: Saurian/zaterran
- Weapon: Battle axe (MK4); Kirehashi (MK:DA, MK:A)
- Origin: Zaterra

Reptile is a character in the Mortal Kombat fighting game franchise by Midway Games and NetherRealm Studios. He debuted in the original 1992 game as a hidden opponent, establishing him as the first secret character in fighting game history. Reptile became playable in the follow-up Mortal Kombat II (1993) and has remained a mainstay of the franchise. As implied by his name, he is a Saurian, a fictional species of reptilian humanoids. One of the last surviving members of his race, he aligns himself with the series' primary villains in the hope his service will lead to the Saurians' revival.

Outside of the games, Reptile has appeared in various related media. Reception to the character has been positive, with praise for his evolution from a hidden character to one of the franchise's most iconic fighters.

== Conception and history ==
Reptile's character concept was conceived by Mortal Kombat co-creator and lead programmer Ed Boon after the original 1992 game was released into arcades. Noting the success of the palette swap method used for the sprites of the game's ninja characters Scorpion and Sub-Zero, he and series character designer John Tobias collaborated on including a "super secret hidden feature" in the game who would be a "cooler version of Scorpion". Boon and Tobias were inspired by the Sheng Long urban legend from Street Fighter II when Reptile was conceived as a hidden character. Reptile was completed in a single evening, and inserted into the third revision of the game in August 1992, the same month the game was first released. Reptile was not selectable nor playable as his inclusion was originally intended as a marketing tool for the game due to the extreme conditions required for players to encounter him, with the developers in turn hoping word of mouth would spread rumors of the character's existence. Boon noted in a 1995 interview that the positive response to the character led to Reptile's inclusion in subsequent series installments as a playable fighter.

=== Design and gameplay ===
Reptile appeared in the digitized Mortal Kombat fighting games as a palette swap of the two male ninja characters, with his green armor representing a combination of Scorpion and Sub-Zero's yellow and blue, respectively. He retained this design upon his playable debut in Mortal Kombat II (1993), with his true reptilian nature first revealed whenever his face mask was pulled down for his acid spit attack, or removed entirely for his tongue-grab Fatality and his arcade ending. Reptile and the other ninja characters were omitted from Mortal Kombat 3 (1995) but included in the upgrade Ultimate Mortal Kombat 3. For the three-dimensional release Mortal Kombat 4 (1997), he was given a unique design for the first time with minimal body armor, his face fully exposed, and more of his true reptilian identity revealed. With the palette-swap characters receiving distinct makeovers for the series' three-dimensional fighting games, Reptile was given a full reptilian design in Mortal Kombat: Deadly Alliance (2002) that included a long tail while he wore minimal gold and black armor, a design that was maintained for his nonplayable appearance in the 2005 beat 'em up title Mortal Kombat: Shaolin Monks with the exception of black straps wrapped around his head that left his eyes and mouth exposed. Reptile did not appear in Mortal Kombat: Deception (2004), but returned with the then-entire series roster in the 2006 compilation title Mortal Kombat: Armageddon.

As a secret non-playable character in the first Mortal Kombat, Reptile copied Sub-Zero's and Scorpion's special moves and fought with increased speed. He received his own distinct set of attacks starting with his playable debut in Mortal Kombat II.

Reptile's Fatalities in MKII consist of revealing his reptilian face and using his long tongue to devour the opponent's head, or turning invisible and severing their torso. Later finishing moves expand upon the concept, ranging from regurgitating acid upon the defeated opponent to leaping upon their body and gnawing the flesh from their skulls. In a 2006 series retrospective, the Mortal Kombat development team named Reptile's finishers as some of their favorites from the series.

== Appearances ==
=== Video games ===
In the original Mortal Kombat (1992), Reptile is an unplayable hidden character. He randomly appears onscreen prior to a match with clues on how to access him, with players then required to follow specific guidelines in order to fight him. In Mortal Kombat II (1993), Reptile is now a playable character with the storyline of his being a member of a reptilian race from the fictional dimension of Outworld that was enslaved by its evil emperor Shao Kahn. Promised the revival of his race in exchange for his loyalty, Reptile serves as the bodyguard of one of Kahn's subordinates, evil sorcerer Shang Tsung; Tsung was the target of an assassination attempt from Sub-Zero (Kuai Liang), and in turn Sub-Zero was being stalked by Scorpion.

Reptile was omitted from Mortal Kombat 3 (1995), but returned for the upgrade Ultimate Mortal Kombat 3. He is assigned to find and assassinate Edenian princess Kitana after she kills her evil twin Mileena. In Mortal Kombat 4 (1997), he serves as a minion to the fallen Elder God Shinnok, for which he is again promised the restoration of his race.

In Mortal Kombat: Deadly Alliance (2002), Reptile returns to Shao Kahn's service. After overhearing Shang Tsung's plot to kill Kahn, he attempts to warn his master but meets Nitara, a vampire who offers knowledge of his race. Reptile pledges his loyalties to her but ultimately realizes she is merely using him. He sets out to kill her but instead finds a mysterious egg belonging to the Dragon King Onaga. He is not playable in Mortal Kombat: Deception (2004), in which the egg transforms him into Onaga's avatar, which sets up the events of the game. Separated from Onaga after the latter's defeat, Reptile returns in Mortal Kombat: Armageddon (2006) with the then-entire roster of series characters. In the game's opening sequence, he fights alongside the forces of evil in a battle to claim the elemental Blaze's godlike power.

The thunder god and Earth protector Raiden resets the series timeline in the 2011 reboot game Mortal Kombat, in hopes of preventing Armageddon. Reptile has a minimal presence as a representative of Outworld in its attempt to conquer Earth. In the Shaolin tournament from the original game, he is present from the outset but defeated by Johnny Cage. In the second tournament, he is assigned to fight Sub-Zero but loses, and during the invasion of Earth in the retold events of Mortal Kombat 3, Reptile is beaten by riot officer Kurtis Stryker in combat.

In Mortal Kombat X (2015), Reptile is now identified by the name Syzoth. He plays an instrumental role in new Outworld ruler Kotal Kahn usurping Mileena for the throne, when he reveals that Mileena is not Shao Kahn's biological daughter. Reptile joins Ermac, Erron Black, and Ferra/Torr in serving Kotal Kahn as they conflict with Cassie Cage's military unit in their attempt to protect their home realm of Outworld from Shinnok's forces.

In the rebooted storyline of Mortal Kombat 1 (2023), Reptile's race of the Zaterrans is no longer extinct, but he becomes an outcast among his people for his ability to assume a humanlike appearance. He is blackmailed into serving Shang Tsung, who is holding his family hostage, and the sorcerer is able to learn Syzoth's shapeshifting ability as a result. After Syzoth fails to contain several captured Earth warriors, Shang Tsung reveals he has already slain his family. As a result, Syzoth joins forces with Fire God Liu Kang and the Earth heroes to help prevent the destruction of Earth and Outworld by Shang Tsung and his cohort, the necromancer Quan Chi. After Titan Shang Tsung and his forces are defeated at the conclusion, the newly crowned Outworld empress Mileena asks Syzoth to be her emissary to the Zaterrans, which allows him to return to his homeland free of shame. However, he uncovers records revealing that many Zaterrans also have the ability to shapeshift but were killed by their government in order to keep it from spreading, and he vows to find a way to end their barbaric policies.

Reptile was among several series characters originally included in the "Tournament Edition" of NBA Jam (1993) as unlockable players, but they were removed from later versions of the game at the request of the NBA due to concerns over the violent nature of the Mortal Kombat series.

=== Other media ===
Keith Cooke as Reptile in Mortal Kombat (1995)

In Malibu Comics' Mortal Kombat comic book series, Reptile joins the Mortal Kombat II characters in the three-issue miniseries Goro: Prince of Pain (1994), and in the six-issue miniseries Battlewave (1995), he hypnotizes Sonya Blade into wanting to marry Shao Kahn before the plot is thwarted by the Earth heroes. The junior novel Mortal Kombat: Reptile's World (1996), written by C. Dean Anderson, tells the past of Reptile's race through the perspectives of other series characters.

In the 1995 motion picture Mortal Kombat, Reptile appears as a computer-generated bipedal lizard ordered by Shang Tsung to keep Princess Kitana away from the Earth heroes. He follows them into Outworld but is discovered by Liu Kang, after which Reptile assumes a human form to fight Liu Kang but is killed in battle. Reptile was played by actor and martial artist Keith Cooke, and was a late inclusion in response to focus groups being unimpressed with the film's original fights.

An original character named Komodai, who bore a physical resemblance to Reptile, was featured in an episode of the animated series Mortal Kombat: Defenders of the Realm (1996). Reptile briefly appears in the 2020 animated film Mortal Kombat Legends: Scorpion's Revenge, in which he is killed by Sonya Blade in a fight scene.

Reptile was played by Jon Valera in one episode of the 1998 syndicated television series Mortal Kombat: Conquest. He is the commander of Shao Kahn's army of Raptors until he betrays Kahn and schemes to share dominion over his domain until he is killed by Kahn's priests. In the 2010 short film Mortal Kombat: Rebirth, a grittier contemporary take on the series canon, Reptile (played by Richard Dorton) is depicted as a cannibalistic killer afflicted with Harlequin-type ichthyosis. In the 2021 film reboot Mortal Kombat, Reptile is sent by Shang Tsung to dispatch the chosen Earth participants of the Mortal Kombat tournament, but is killed by Kano. Like the 1995 film, the character was depicted in bipedal reptilian form and computer-generated.

=== Merchandise and promotion ===
A Reptile action figure was released by Hasbro as part of a G.I. Joe line of toys, packaged with the series-themed vehicle for the toyline. The figure comes with a katana and grappling hook. Another action figure to promote Shaolin Monks was released in 2006 by Jazwares. Fully posable, it includes an alternate head, detachable tongue and a large-bladed scimitar. He was one of many MK characters depicted on 2.5" x 3.5" collectible magnets released by Ata-Boy Wholesale in 2011. Reptile also featured prominently in the introduction sequence of Mortal Kombat 4, portions of which were used in a television commercial to promote the game.

== Reception ==
While Reptile has received positive critical reception for his origins as a hidden character, response to his other characteristics has been mixed. Zach Gass of TheGamer praised the evolution of the character throughout his series appearances. "Like all of the rainbow ninjas in the series, Reptile has grown and developed a look, fighting style, and character all his own." He was fifth in Game Revolution's list of top "old school" Mortal Kombat characters", praised for his introduction in Mortal Kombat and his changes in the sequel. Reptile was featured in a 2008 MSN article about the ten greatest Easter eggs in gaming. In 2010 UGO, included him on the list of the 25 coolest hidden characters in video gaming. In UGO Networks' 2012 list of the top Mortal Kombat characters, Reptile placed sixth, stating that he is the best hidden character in the series.

In a 2020 episode of the Rotten Tomatoes podcast "Rotten Tomatoes Is Wrong" discussing the 1995 Mortal Kombat film, the panelists opined that Reptile is one of the worst characters in the series, mentioning his origin as a palette swap, and argued that the series should have kept him as a hidden character because it was the one thing that made him cool. Reptile's absence in Mortal Kombat 11 was questioned by Dale Wilson of PlayStation LifeStyle, whom stated "With classic characters like Scorpion, Subzero, Johnny Cage, Jade, and Sonya Blade all making appearances in Mortal Kombat 11, I find it odd that Reptile was left out of the mix." Gavin Jasper from Den of Geek criticized Reptile's design in the 1995 Mortal Kombat film, stating "he did not age well at all." Gasper was appreciative of Reptile using his acid spit from the games, however.
