= MK6 (disambiguation) =

MK6 may refer to:

- MK postcode area, a postal district in the United Kingdom.
- Mario Kart Wii, the sixth game in the Mario Kart series released for the Wii in 2008.
- Mortal Kombat: Deception, the sixth game in the Mortal Kombat series.
- Volkswagen Golf Mk6, a car released by Volkswagen in 2006.
