= Vic Chao =

American actor

- Born: Victor Chao
- Occupation: Actor
- Children: 1
- Website: vicchao.com/Home.html

Victor Chao is an American actor. He is best known for portraying Dr. Seiji Shimada in Mega Shark Versus Giant Octopus, Dr. Shinji Shimada in Command & Conquer: Red Alert 3 - Uprising, Eric Tsu in The Crew, Kenshi, Sektor, Goro and Triborg in Mortal Kombat X and CTU Agent McCallan and FBI Agent Mark Dornan in two seasons of 24. Currently, he plays District Attorney Daniel Chen on General Hospital.

== Filmography ==
=== Film ===
Year	Title	Role	Notes
2000	Hammerlock	Huong Lo's Gang Member	
2001	Pearl Harbor	Japanese Doctor	
2001	Rat Race	Engineer	
2003	7 Songs	Japanese Tourist	
2005	Miss Congeniality 2: Armed & Fabulous	Agent Hills	
2005	Dogg's Hamlet, Cahoot's Macbeth	Inspector	
2006	Mad Cowgirl	Charlie	
2006	Goldfish	Mark	
2008	Living Hell	Sgt. Walter Kinoshita	Television film
2008	Mask of the Ninja	Shokofu	Television film
2008	The Big V	Lightning Guy	Short film
2009	Mega Shark Versus Giant Octopus	Seiji Shimada	Direct-to-video
2009	The Devil's Matchmaker	Tim Wood	Short film
2012	Money Fight	Young General Krang	
2013	Walk of Shame	Shift Captain	
2015	Pipe Dream	Charles Takahashi	Short film
2015	American Ultra	Thug	
2016	Casa Vita	Max the Trainer	Television film
2019	Abominable	Goons, Jin Impersonator (voice)	
2023	The Monkey King	Hat Villager (voice)	
2024	Kung Fu Panda 4	Bear Crime Boss, Last Ram, Tavern Patron (voice)	
2024	Ultraman: Rising	KDF Pilot (voice)	
2026	Avatar Aang: The Last Airbender	Hong (voice)	

=== Television ===
Year	Title	Role	Notes
2004	All That	Escaped Prisoner	Episode: "Drake Bell"
2005	24	CTU Agent McCallan	3 episodes
2009	24	FBI Agent Mark Dornan	2 episodes
2014	Quick Draw	Wong Fei Hung	Episode: "Chinatown"
2014	Criminal Minds	Co-Pilot Philip Tran	Episode: "A Thousand Suns"
2018	Heathers	Mr. Finn	2 episodes
2019	Young Justice	Doctor Moon (voice)	Episode: "Triptych"
2019	Rise of the Teenage Mutant Ninja Turtles	Boss Bruce (voice)	Episode: "You Got Served"
2020	Great Pretender	Liu Xiao, Komada (voice)	Episodes "Wizard of Far East"
2021	Ben 10	Agent Six (voice)	Episode: "Ben Gen 10"
2024	Kite Man: Hell Yeah!	Captain Cold (voice)	Episode: "Portal Potty, Hell Yeah!"
2024	Secret Level	Mad Beggar (voice)	Episode: "Honor of Kings: The Way of All Things"

=== Video games ===
Year	Title	Role	Notes
2009	Command & Conquer: Red Alert 3 – Uprising	Doctor Shimada	
2011	Kinect: Disneyland Adventures		
2012	Sleeping Dogs	Johnny Ratface, Siu Wah	
2012	XCOM: Enemy Unknown	Soldier	
2013	BioShock Infinite	Chen Lin	
2014	The Crew	Eric Tsu	
2015	Mortal Kombat X	Kenshi, Goro, Sektor, Triborg	
2018	Spider-Man	Additional voices	
2018	NBA 2K19	Coach Wang Chao	
2019	Judgment	Renji Honda	
2020	Final Fantasy VII Remake	Tseng	
2020	Ghost of Tsushima	Takeshi	Motion capture
2021	Lost Judgment	Renji Honda	
2022	Crisis Core: Final Fantasy VII Reunion	Tseng	
2023	Mortal Kombat 1	Kenshi, Goro	
2023	Like a Dragon Gaiden: The Man Who Erased His Name	Additional voices	
2024	Like a Dragon: Infinite Wealth	Additional voices	
2024	Final Fantasy VII Rebirth	Tseng	
2024	The Legend of Heroes: Trails Through Daybreak	Zin Vathek, Gien Lu	
2025	The Legend of Heroes: Trails Through Daybreak II	Zin Vathek, Gien Lu	
2025	Like a Dragon: Pirate Yakuza in Hawaii	Homare Nishitani	
2025	Yakuza 0 Director's Cut	Homare Nishitani	
2025	Trails in the Sky 1st Chapter	Zin Vathek	
2025	League of Legends	Xin Zhao	
2026	Yakuza Kiwami 3 & Dark Ties	Additional voices	
2026	Trails in the Sky 2nd Chapter	Zin Vathek	
