= Shane Warren Jones =

Canadian actor, writer, and dancer

- Born: Newmarket, Ontario, Canada
- Occupations: Actor, writer, dancer
- Years active: 2004–present

Shane Warren Jones (born in Newmarket, Ontario) is a Canadian actor best known for his roles in the television series All My Children as Colton Johnson, His work on the final season of J. J. Abrams' Fringe, his work on G4's Attack of the Show! and has had uncredited roles in films such as Hitch, Ocean's Thirteen, and The Hammer. Jones has also performed in stunts in films as well in which he is also uncredited.

== Personal life ==
Jones enjoys practicing martial arts and gymnastics, and currently resides in Los Angeles, California.

== Filmography ==
- 2004: Midnight Spike's House Brew (Bar patron, uncredited)
- 2005: Hitch (Dance floor wedding guest, uncredited)
- 2007: The Hammer (Nate)
- 2007: Ocean's Thirteen (Valet)
- 2008: Run! (Josiah Henry)
- 2009: The Unknown (The number 1)
- 2009: Attack of the Show! (Ninja)
- 2010: All My Children (Colton Johnson)
- 2011: Mortal Kombat: Legacy (Cyrax/Hydro)
- 2012: Fringe (Loyalist Guard)
- 2013: Screwed (Abdul)
- 2013: BK Comedy Series
- 2014: Fight to the finish

== Stunts ==
- 2009: Nip/Tuck - One episode
- 2010: Deadliest Warrior - One Episode
- 2011: Attack of the Show!- Two Episodes

== As producer ==
- 2009: Attack of the Show! - One Episode
