= Baraka (Mortal Kombat) =

Mortal Kombat character

- Baraka in Mortal Kombat 1 (2023)
- First appearance: Mortal Kombat II (1993)
- Created by: Ed Boon and John Tobias
- Voiced by: List: Dan Washington (MKvsDCU); Bob Carter (MK9); Greg Eagles (MKX); Steve Blum (2019–present)
- Portrayed by: List: Dennis Keiffer (MKA); Lateef Crowder (MKR); Fraser Aitcheson (MKL); Ryan Watson and Allen Sandoval (MKLT); CJ Bloomfield (2026 film)
- Motion capture: Richard Divizio (MKII)

Baraka (/bəˈrɑːkə/ bə-RAH-kə) is a character from the Mortal Kombat franchise, co-created by Ed Boon and John Tobias. He was introduced in Mortal Kombat II (1993) as a nomadic mutant belonging to the Tarkatan species, which are distinguished by their ferocity and unusual facial features. Baraka, like others of his kind, possesses sharp, spiked teeth and retractable arm blades, which he primarily uses in combat. He originates from Outworld, one of Mortal Kombat's crucial realms.

Baraka has received a generally mixed to positive reception. His early appearances received praise for his unique monstrous design and criticism directed at the lack of character complexity and development he received as the series continued. Critics praised his role in Mortal Kombat 1 for his importance to the plot and added depth.

== Character overview ==
The designers of Mortal Kombat II (1993) created Baraka's look using an improvised Nosferatu-style mask, attaching artificial nails to form the teeth, and using shiny cardboard for his arm blades. Unused concepts for Baraka included one with hair and a red dot on his forehead and another as a bald, masked ninja wielding hook swords. Baraka also helped shape the series' "Friendship" concept, stemming from co-creator John Tobias's idea of showing his violent nature with an unexpectedly amusing action.

His early backstory portrays him leading Outworld's Tarkatan army, a fierce hybrid of humans and demons that occasionally served as soldiers under villainous Shao Kahn. Baraka was opportunistic, often allying with antagonists and betraying them. The series' second reboot, Mortal Kombat 1 (2023), reshaped Baraka's backstory: he was once a reputable merchant before being infected with the incurable Tarkat disease and sent to a colony of Tarkatans affected by it. Their suffering motivated him to help them in any way.

== Appearances ==
Baraka is first introduced in Mortal Kombat II as one of the playable characters. After being absent from Mortal Kombat 3 and Ultimate Mortal Kombat 3, he returns in Mortal Kombat Trilogy, MK3's final update. He is, once again, absent from Mortal Kombat 4, but also returns in its update Mortal Kombat Gold. He would later also be playable in Mortal Kombat: Deception, Mortal Kombat: Armageddon, Mortal Kombat vs. DC Universe, Mortal Kombat 9, Mortal Kombat 11 and Mortal Kombat 1. In Mortal Kombat X, he is fought as an opponent in the game's story mode, but is not playable.

In other media, he appears in the Malibu Comics, the Mortal Kombat: Live Tour, the 1997 film Mortal Kombat Annihilation, Mortal Kombat: Rebirth, Mortal Kombat: Legacy, the Mortal Kombat X comic series (2015), Mortal Kombat Legends: Scorpion's Revenge, Mortal Kombat Legends: Battle of the Realms and Mortal Kombat II.

== Critical reception ==
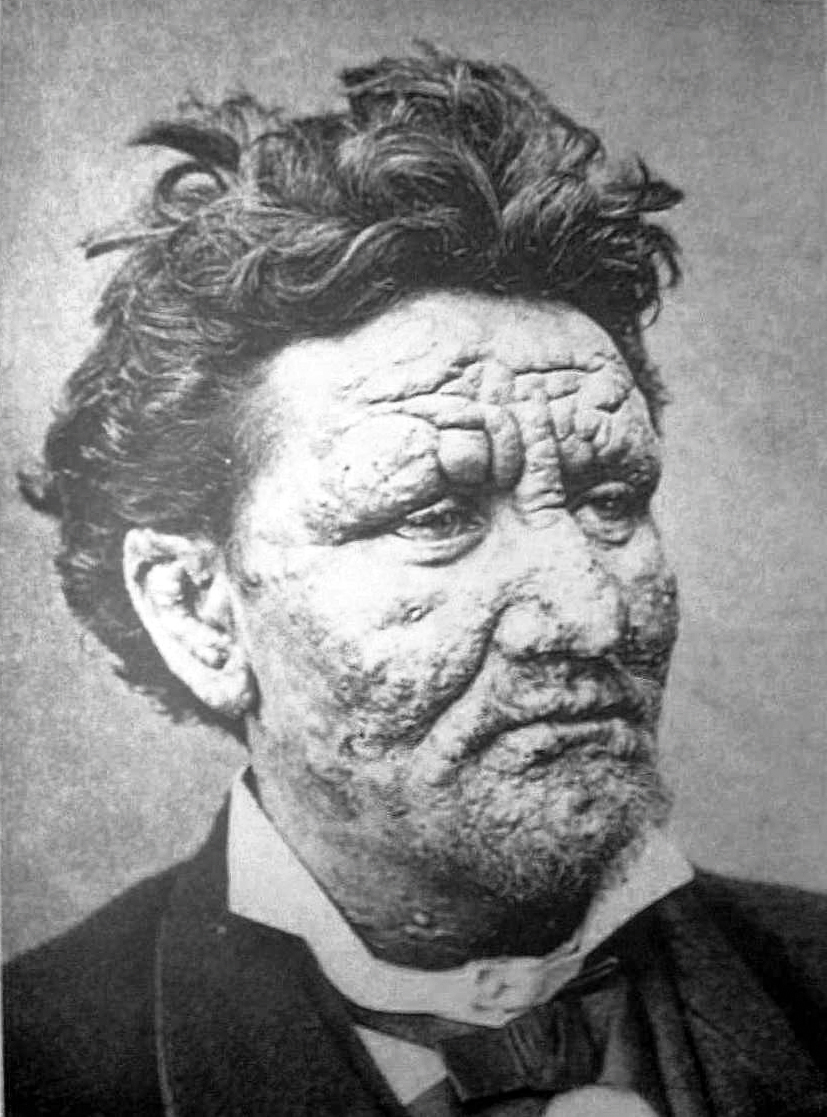
Leprosy has been studied in relation to Baraka's Tarkat disease. This image shows an example of it.

According to Den of Geek's Gavin Jasper, in the early era of arcade fighting games, it was common for each game to include at least one "freak" character, to which he referenced Baraka alongside Street Fighter's Blanka and Samurai Shodown's Genan Shiranui. Jasper stated that Baraka's monstrous look, often compared to a mix of Nosferatu and a comic book mutant, made him suitable for the aura of Mortal Kombat II (1993). His signature arm blades resembling Wolverine's claws made him noteworthy at the beginning of the series. However, Jasper contended that as the franchise evolved, Baraka's specialty started to diminish as he was overshadowed in popularity by fellow character Mileena and eventually became a minor villain. Conversely, Jasper was pleased with the character development Baraka received in Mortal Kombat 11 (2019), observing him being symbolized as a "flag-waving" leader of the Tarkatans.

In Shea Serrano's satirical article from The Ringer, which imagines a debate on Mortal Kombat II (1993) Fatalities hypothetically discussed by the game's characters, Baraka is portrayed by Serrano as a straightforward figure using humor and sarcasm, initially joking that Johnny Cage is absent from the debate because he is "somewhere masturbating to a picture of himself", a comment that amuses the group, although Cage eventually admits of committing the exact. Serrano further presents Baraka as genuinely curious and appreciative, asking practical questions about Sub-Zero's daily life concerning ice powers and valuing brutality and personal impact in fighting, praising Jax's head-smashing Fatality for feeling more intense than simple decapitation. Throughout the discussion, Serrano portrays Baraka with the idea of how he would casually interact with others, balancing seriousness with playful banter.

Ben Kuchera of Ars Technica criticized one of Baraka's Fatalities in Mortal Kombat vs. DC Universe (2008), noting that it simply involved the character slicing an opponent with his arm blades but lacked significant visible damage. He said the move resembled a standard in-game attack, weakening its impact as a Fatality. Kuchera attributed that to the game's "Teen" rating, which restricted the graphic violence archetypal of Baraka's characterization and other Mortal Kombat characters. In a 2023 Mortal Kombat 1 retrospective, IGN editorial producer Mitchell Saltzman expressed that Baraka's role alongside another character, Reptile, was considerably improved in contrast to previous entries in the series. He appreciated that the character, formerly presented in minor roles and typically as a subordinate, received increased narrative importance, including a dedicated story chapter and sufficient involvement within the game's storyline.

Matías Alderete of the University of Buenos Aires's Department of History has linked connections between the Tarkatans, a nomadic group led by Baraka, and the historical nomadic societies of West Asia. These real-world groups frequently migrated in response to seasonal climatic variations, particularly fluctuations in rainfall, and maintained symbiotic relationships with neighboring sedentary agricultural communities. Archaeological and archival evidence, including those from the ancient city of Mari in northern Iraq, document how such nomadic tribes provided labor, trade goods, and military assistance in exchange for access to pastures and other vital resources. Comparable patterns are seen in the behavior of the Tarkatans, who are portrayed as practicing a structured form of migration and cooperation described as controlled nomadism.

Leonardo Dallacqua de Carvalho, a professor at the State University of Maranhão, has conducted a detailed study on the depiction of Tarkat by fundamentally using Baraka, drawing connections between this fictional condition and the real-life disease Leprosy. Moreover, his study includes an in-depth investigation of Baraka's character development across the series' installments, from his debut in Mortal Kombat II (1993) through the Mortal Kombat 1 (2023) iteration, while assessing topics such as personality, discrimination, and transformation. Furthermore, Carvalho's research incorporates audience reception studies, utilizing data collected from social media platforms such as Reddit and YouTube to analyze player perceptions and discussions concerning both Baraka and the portrayal of Tarkat. Carvalho's study explores how gaming communities engage with fictional diseases.
