= Mortal Kombat: Legacy =

Web series directed by Kevin Tancharoen

- DVD cover for the first season
- Also known as: Mortal Kombat: Legacy II (season two)
- Genre: Action; Anthology; Fantasy; Martial arts
- Based on: Mortal Kombat by: Ed Boon; John Tobias
- Directed by: Kevin Tancharoen
- Ending theme: "It Has Begun" performed by K^K (S2)
- Composers: Tyler Weiss (S1); Dane DeViller (S1); Christopher Alan Lee (S2)
- Country of origin: United States
- Original languages: English; Japanese
- No. of seasons: 2
- No. of episodes: 19 (list of episodes)

Production
- Executive producers: John Orlando (S1); Tomas Harlan (S1); Max Leitman (S2)
- Producers: Kevin Tancharoen; Lance Sloane; Tim Carter (S1)
- Cinematography: C. Kim Miles (S1); Scott Kevan (S2)
- Editors: Paul Furminger (S1); William Yeh (S2)
- Running time: 9–12 minutes
- Production companies: NetherRealm Studios; Warner Bros. Interactive Entertainment; Warner Premiere Digital

Original release
- Network: YouTube
- Release: April 11, 2011 – September 26, 2013

Related
- Mortal Kombat: Rebirth

Mortal Kombat: Legacy is an American web series adapted from the Mortal Kombat video game franchise. It debuted on Machinima.com's YouTube channel on April 11, 2011. The second season was released in its entirety on September 26, 2013.

The show's premise originated with director Kevin Tancharoen's short film, Mortal Kombat: Rebirth (2010), which portrayed the background to the original game's story, albeit in a more grounded fashion. Seeking the green-light from the studio for production on a re-imagined Mortal Kombat film, he submitted the concept to Warner Bros. Pictures after having presented it to both Midway Games (Warner purchased Mortal Kombat and other assets from the original owners of the property in 2009) and New Line Cinema (the original Mortal Kombat film rights holder became a division/label of the larger studio in 2008), which declined to back the film, despite the attention and positive fan reception. Instead Tancharoen got the go-ahead to shoot the web series.

== Plot ==
The first season of Mortal Kombat: Legacy is a prequel to the original game, explaining the background stories of several characters from the series and demonstrating their reasons for participating in the upcoming tenth Mortal Kombat tournament on which the first game was based. The episodes are nonlinear with minimal continuity and each devoted to the story of a specific character or characters. The second season covers the tournament itself.

== Cast ==
Character	Description	Season 1 actor	Season 2 actor
Baraka	General of Outworld's Tarkatan warriors, under Shao Kahn's rule.	Fraser Aitcheson	—
Cyrax	Loyal ninja assassin for the Lin Kuei who apprehensively undergoes automation into a cybernetic warrior.	Shane Warren Jones	—
Ermac	Fighter composed of the souls of multiple dead warriors; also possesses the power of psychokinesis.	—	Kim Do Nguyen
Jackson "Jax" Briggs	Captain of the Deacon City Police Department, and Sonya's longtime partner.	Michael Jai White	—
Johnny Cage	Famous actor struggling to maintain his fame after a string of controversies. Fights alongside Earth's defenders in Season 2.	Matt Mullins	Casper Van Dien
Kano	Notorious thug and head of the Black Dragon crime cartel.	Darren Shahlavi	—
Kenshi	Blind swordsman possessing the power of telekinesis.	—	Daniel Southworth
Kitana	Former princess of Edenia, daughter of King Jerrod and Queen Sindel; raised as an assassin by Emperor Shao Kahn. She entered the tournament alongside Shang Tsung's forces but later turned against them.	Samantha Jo	Samantha Jo
Kurtis Stryker	Lieutenant of the Deacon City Police Department alongside Jax and Sonya. Fights alongside Earth's defenders in Season 2.	Tahmoh Penikett	Eric Jacobus
Kung Lao	Friend of Liu Kang and fellow Shaolin monk. Fights alongside Earth's defenders in Season 2.	—	Mark Dacascos
Liu Kang	A violent and sociopathic former Shaolin monk turned vigilante and former friend of Kung Lao. He joins the tournament fighting alongside Shang Tsung.	—	Brian Tee
Mileena	A half-Edenian, half-Tarkatan clone of Kitana, trained as Kahn's loyal assassin.	Jolene Tran	Michelle Lee
Quan Chi	A sorcerer allied to Shang Tsung on the side of the Netherrealm.	Michael Rogers	—
Queen Sindel	The former queen of Edenia; wife of King Jerrod and mother of Princess Kitana.	Beatrice Ilg	—
Raiden	God of Thunder and Protector of Earthrealm. Leads Earth's warriors in the defense against Shang Tsung's forces.	Ryan Robbins	David Lee McInnis
Hanzo Hasashi / Scorpion	General of the Japanese Shirai Ryu ninja clan, who are rivals of the Lin Kuei. Due to the fear of inheriting his father's unhealthy sense of hatred, he agreed to a truce to end the war started by Sub-Zero. He joined fighting alongside Shang Tsung.	Ian Anthony Dale	Ian Anthony Dale
Sektor	Loyal ninja assassin for the Lin Kuei who willingly undergoes automation into a cybernetic warrior.	Peter Shinkoda	—
Shang Tsung	Nefarious sorcerer serving Shao Kahn. In season two, hosts the Mortal Kombat tournament, leading his warriors against those of Earthrealm.	Johnson Phan	Cary-Hiroyuki Tagawa
Shao Kahn	Emperor of Outworld; adoptive father to Kitana and Mileena.	Aleks Paunovic	—
Sonya Blade	Lieutenant in the Deacon City police department and Jax's partner.	Jeri Ryan	—
Bi-Han / Sub-Zero	Assassin for the Lin Kuei clan, who are rivals of the Shirai Ryu. He tires of the war between the clans and therefore calls a truce. Fights alongside Earth's defenders in Season 2.	Kevan Ohtsji	Eric Steinberg
Kuai Liang / Sub-Zero	Lin Kuei assassin and younger brother of the deceased Bi-Han.	—	Harry Shum Jr.

== Production ==
=== Conception ===
On June 8, 2010, Mortal Kombat: Rebirth surfaced on YouTube amid confusion about its origins and intentions. Kevin Tancharoen said he'd been thinking about a Mortal Kombat reboot for some time, and when the technology became available to him, he felt the time was right to make a short film. Tancharoen wrote and directed the film over a weekend without any studio involvement. With help from friends and colleagues and a $7,500 budget, the film was completed in two months. Before submitting the film to Warner Bros., Tancharoen intended to privately upload the short to YouTube to gauge the response of a colleague. He accidentally made it available to the general public, who quickly voiced an overwhelmingly positive response.

Tancharoen noted the positive fan response and realized the advantage of social networking in helping small-time directors gain a following to take to film studio executives. He met with Warner Bros. executives, who stopped short of green-lighting a major motion picture, but agreed to fund a web series based on the Mortal Kombat franchise. The final step was convincing Ed Boon, co-creator of the franchise and executive producer at NetherRealm Studios, who had just produced the latest video game installment, to agree to the series. Boon was impressed with Mortal Kombat: Rebirth, but not entirely sold on Tancharoen's re-imagined vision. After he met with Tancharoen, Boon was surprised by his enthusiasm for the franchise and quickly offered his support.

=== Development ===
==== Season 1 development ====
Mortal Kombat: Legacy is produced by Warner Bros. Digital Distribution, Warner Bros. Interactive Entertainment and Warner Premiere. Tancharoen, Lance Sloane and Tim Carter serve as producers. It consists of nine 8-12 minute episodes, each written by Tancharoen and Spartacus: Blood and Sand writers Todd Helbing and Aaron Helbing, with Tancharoen directing. Larnell Stovall, who worked with Tancharoen on Rebirth, is the stunt coordinator. The series was filmed in Vancouver in February and March, with Tancharoen tweeting daily updates of their progress. Post-production began in March and continued alongside release. Visual effects were handled by Goldtooth Creative Agency.

When Tancharoen made Mortal Kombat: Rebirth in 2010, he took the traditional Mortal Kombat story, which was for 20 years based in a supernatural world, and re-told it based on real-world scenarios. The characters and the basic plot of a tournament remained, but most mystical elements like alternate realms, sorcery, and the backstories of characters such as Baraka and Reptile were adjusted to fit the new realistic universe. This new take on the franchise is what prompted Ed Boon to remark that Rebirth "probably crosses the line" in terms of re-imagining. Warner Bros. was receptive to the new style. Despite the changes, Tancharoen promised fans the web series would be true to the franchise, including the mystical and supernatural elements famous to Mortal Kombat. The small budget forced some stories to be set in a realistic world to avoid the high costs of creating a fantasy world with visual effects. Of Boon's involvement, Tancharoen said he was instrumental in this show adhering to the canon of the series, but that he allowed Tancharoen to include his own ideas.

The first two episodes are based mostly in a true-to-life universe. Episode three follows suit, but ends with the first hint of supernatural themes when Shang Tsung appears to freeze time to converse with Johnny Cage. Episodes 4 and 5 reveal the most in the issue of Tancharoen's stylistic approach to the real-world/mysticism debate. Baraka is portrayed true to his original backstory from the video games, and ideas such as sorcery and multiple realms are fleshed out. Criticism has been leveled at the production team for abandoning the original real-world approach of Rebirth for Legacy, despite Tancharoen continuously stating that the supernatural elements of Mortal Kombat would be included in the series. Tancharoen said that some stories could be told in his realistic Rebirth approach but that other stories were too grounded in the supernatural to be converted to a real-world portrayal. The release of Episode 6 includes a note from Tancharoen himself, written to the fans before the episode begins: "The following episode represents my different take on the Mortal Kombat universe. I think it combines the perfect amount of gritty realism mixed with a hint of mysticism. I hope you guys enjoy it."

==== Season 2 development ====
On July 15, 2012, IGN revealed an exclusive video made by Tancharoen directed at fans announcing Season 2, adding that all of the scripts were complete. The director also confirmed more fight scenes and improved special effects in the upcoming season to focus on the actual Mortal Kombat tournament of the original game, in response to the fans who were let down by the setup of the first season. On December 3, 2012, it was announced that the second season of the series had begun production in Los Angeles, with the first footage debuting worldwide in a trailer on February 17, 2013 at the Streamy Awards. In 24 hours, the trailer had been viewed over 2 million times. Tancharoen also stated that Season 2 would not affect his development of the feature film. On March 31, 2013, a TV spot aired during AMC's Talking Dead for the series – the first time a YouTube channel had bought ad space on television.

Season 2 consists of ten episodes, was co-written by Tancharoen, Josh Baizer and Marshall Johnson, is directed by Tancharoen, features a crew of approximately 90-100 people, and continues to be broadcast exclusively on Machinima's YouTube channel by Warner Bros. Digital Distribution. Bandito Brothers replaced Goldtooth Creative to handle visual effects. The production concluded in December 2012.

==== Season 3 development ====
At Comic-Con 2013, Tancharoen noted that Ryan would not be returning as Sonya for the second season due to her commitment to Body of Proof, but had hoped to bring her back for the third, in which Kabal was also slated to appear after Tancharoen had been unable to accommodate the character in the second season because of budget limitations. Tancharoen departed the series in October 2013 due to the lack of progress on the reboot film. However, on March 27, 2014, he told Nerd Reactor that both he and Warner Bros are still planning season 3 with him directing. On January 13, 2015, martial arts trainer and stunt coordinator Garrett Warren confirmed his involvement in the third season of Mortal Kombat: Legacy, without revealing his role. Casper Van Dien confirmed his involvement in the new season by posting photos of his martial arts training alongside season 2 co-star Mark Dacascos. On January 17, 2015, Van Dien posted a photo of his script for "Mortal Kombat 3," crediting John Cabrera as the writer. Garrett Warren confirmed filming had begun on January 19, 2015. The webseries was supposed to be released in 2016, but this did not happen, and no other information regarding the third season has since been released.

=== Casting ===
==== Season 1 casting ====
Michael Jai White, Jeri Ryan, Matt Mullins and Ian Anthony Dale reprise their roles from Mortal Kombat: Rebirth as Jax, Sonya Blade, Johnny Cage and Scorpion respectively. Johnson Phan and Fraser Aitcheson replace James Lew and Lateef Crowder to portray Shang Tsung and Baraka respectively. Kano is played by Darren Shahlavi, Tahmoh Penikett plays Kurtis Stryker, and Sam Tjhia plays Kitana. Episode 4 revealed Aleks Paunovic as Shao Kahn, Jolene Tran as Mileena, Kirby Morrow as King Jerrod, and Beatrice Ilg as Sindel. The characters of Sub-Zero (Kevan Ohtsji), Sektor (Peter Shinkoda) and Cyrax (Shane Warren Jones) were revealed in the first official trailer released April 11, 2011. Ryan Robbins was revealed as Raiden and Michael Rogers was revealed to be playing Quan Chi in the credits of Episode 7. Ed Boon makes a cameo appearance in Episode 3 as Ed Goodman, a TV producer who has previously worked with Cage.

==== Season 2 casting ====
Season 2 featured a considerable shakeup of the cast from the first season. Casper Van Dien replaced Matt Mullins as Johnny Cage, while Cary-Hiroyuki Tagawa, who had played Shang Tsung in the 1995 film, took over the part from Johnson Phan. Tahmoh Penikett did not return as Stryker and was replaced by Eric Jacobus, Michelle Lee took over from Jolene Tran as Mileena, and David Lee McInnis replaced Ryan Robbins as Raiden. The only holdovers from the first season were Ian Anthony Dale and Samantha Tjhia, as Scorpion and Kitana, respectively.

Debuting characters included Harry Shum, Jr. as Kuai Liang (Sub-Zero's younger brother), Brian Tee as Liu Kang, Mark Dacascos as Kung Lao, Kim Do Nguyen as Ermac, and Daniel Southworth as Kenshi. Jeri Ryan (Sonya), Michael Jai White (Jax), and Darren Shahlavi (Kano) did not return, nor did their respective characters.

== Release ==
=== Marketing ===
On April 7, 2011, a scene from the series was released on Machinima's YouTube channel as a teaser trailer. The short clip revealed the title of the series to be Mortal Kombat: Legacy. On April 11, 2011, the first official trailer debuted. It comprised clips from all nine episodes of the series, confirming characters Sub-Zero, Sektor, and Cyrax, and revealed the story to concern the motivations of several characters before the beginning of the tournament portrayed in the first Mortal Kombat video game.

Tancharoen confirmed the first episode's premiere to occur before the release of the latest installment of the video game. On April 11, 2011, the first full episode of the series was released on Machinima.com and on YouTube, with episode 2 airing one day before the video game's release. After episode 2 was released, it was quickly pulled down and replaced with a censored version that eliminated some of the more gratuitous violence and imagery. Episode 3 was released beginning with the censored version, muting profanities. On April 29, both episodes were released in their uncensored format. Episode 4 was released without censorship. Tancharoen later explained that the censorship was required by YouTube after an overwhelming amount of inappropriate "flags". An agreement was reached between the studio and YouTube that any episodes requiring censorship will be released with offending material removed, with the uncensored versions released several days later requiring age confirmation.

In several tweets in June 2011, Tancharoen stated that the final episode would not be released along the usual pattern of midnight Tuesday morning, but would premiere some time during the 2011 Comic Con event to be held between July 21–24, 2011. In July 2011, Shock Till You Drop received an image teasing the final episode of the series with characters Cyrax and Sektor, and explained that the episode is being "fine-tuned" before it debuts during the Mortal Kombat: Legacy Comic-Con panel on Thursday, 21 July between 2-3pm. The episode was officially released on Machinima.com's YouTube channel on July 24. The cast and crew of Season 2 featured in a panel at the 2013 San Diego Comic-Con, and all season 2 episodes were released simultaneously on September 26, 2013.

=== Home media ===
Tancharoen revealed plans for an uncensored DVD and Blu-ray release. On August 10, 2011, Warner Premiere revealed a Blu-ray release date of November 8, with no mention of a DVD release date. Special features include Mortal Kombat: Legacy – Fights, a feature exploring how fatalities and extreme violence aid in Mortal Kombat storytelling, Mortal Kombat: Legacy – Fan Made, a feature with Tancharoen explaining his interest in the franchise, as well as documentaries Mortal Kombat: Legacy – Expanding the Netherrealm, Mortal Kombat: Mysticism, and Mortal Kombat: Gear, covering the franchise universe, the powers of its characters, and the weapons they use, respectively. Season 2 was released on October 14, 2014.

The series was made available to stream on HBO Max in April 2021.

== Reception ==
=== Critical response ===
Reviews of Mortal Kombat: Legacy were generally positive. The first episode became YouTube's most viewed video for that week, accumulating 5.5 million views, whereas Tancharoen's short, also considered a success, received only 2.1 million in total on the official account. President of Warner Bros. Digital Distribution, Thomas Gewecke, expressed excitement about the first episode and its prospects for future adaptations, saying, "it's an incredibly powerful, strong and well done piece of filmmaking. It's a reinterpretation of the franchise in live-action form that we'd like to explore as different concepts and see what approach works best." Episode two aired with considerably less attention, possessing only a quarter of views when compared with the first episode. The release of the fifth episode garnered only 424,000 views in the first 24 hours. One day after the release of episode five, the total views for the entire series to date surpassed 30,000,000.

IGN described Legacy as the "most elegantly produced web series", giving particular mention to episode one for "effective action sequences and some great cinematography". It looked favorably upon episode 4 for the first use of "extraordinarily effective" animation and "poetic" voice-over narration, the removal of censorship, the "fascinating character lore and dazzling fantasy [and] a beautifully crafted land of Outworld". Episode five was praised for the score, the attention paid to the character development and story, the editing and the "quite great" visual effects. CraveOnline praised the animation style used in episode four, saying Mileena's emerging heritage and the Tarkatan invasion were the episode's best parts. G4TV praised the third episode in the series for its shift towards character development, while not at the expense of the action sequences set forth in the first two episodes. It "allowed the series to broaden its horizons a bit" by creating a likable Johnny Cage, commenting, he "finally lets loose and makes you appreciate the character in a whole new way". Houston Press also joined in the praise of the series' devotion to character development upon the release of Raiden's episode. They stated that while the martial arts took a backseat, the drama of Raiden's "Christlike" story was well-executed, giving audiences a reason to identify with his character in a way the franchise has never been able to do. The Escapist called the Scorpion and Sub-Zero-themed episode 7 "one of the best episodes" in the series, lending an emotional weight to the most famous tale in the franchise.

The series has also received its fair share of criticism, led by the very same agencies who have praised it. CraveOnline was not pleased with the new Johnny Cage, rating the episode a 4 out of 10, claiming Mullins' Johnny Cage "doesn't quite have the right look, a good delivery or impressive martial arts moves". IGN noted of episode one that the "production values don't seem quite as tight and concise as [Rebirth]" in addition to light story and "flat" editing and performances.

By far the most criticized have been episodes four and five for their shift away from the realistic style of Rebirth and the first few episodes, to the "traditional mythology well-known to longtime Kombat fans". Tancharoen also acknowledged the audience split that the "Kitana & Mileena" episodes created, stating that theirs was a story that could not be told in a realistic environment, and that Warner Bros. "wanted to make sure this web series tied into some of the story lines of the Mortal Kombat canon." Unlike episode four, IGN criticized the use of animation this time, stating it cost the episode its energy and created a glut of continuity errors. Cheaper make-up, costume effects, and set design due to budgetary constraints, and a short running time were among the other criticisms. Upon the release of the Raiden-themed episode six, Houston Press suggested that Tancharoen was forced to steer episodes four and five into the traditional Mortal Kombat mystique by Warner Bros. to test how fans would react. Episode six, according to the reviewer, was the studio allowing Tancharoen to return to his own style, finally delivering "cinematic greatness" and "the best [episode] he's done so far. Possibly even better than the original Mortal Kombat: Rebirth". Film School Rejects bemoaned the series' expectation that its viewers be knowledgeable about the franchise's history, explaining that without previous knowledge of the games, the viewer is left with too many questions that may never be answered.
