= Oren Uziel =

American screenwriter (born 1974)

- Born: June 28, 1974 (age 52); Brooklyn, New York, U.S.
- Occupations: Film screenwriter; Director; Producer
- Years active: 2010–present
- Notable work: Mortal Kombat: Rebirth; 22 Jump Street; The Cloverfield Paradox; The Lost City; Spider-Noir

Oren Uziel (born June 28, 1974) is an American film screenwriter, director, and producer best known for his work on Mortal Kombat: Rebirth (2010), 22 Jump Street (2014), The Cloverfield Paradox (2018), and The Lost City (2022).

== Early life ==
Oren Uziel was born on June 28, 1974, in Brooklyn, New York.

== Career ==
In April 2010, Uziel began his career when he co-wrote the fan film Mortal Kombat: Rebirth, which led to New Line Cinema and Warner Bros. hiring him to script a feature-length Mortal Kombat film in September 2011. After languishing in development hell for nearly a decade, the film was released in April 2021, with Uziel credited as a co-story writer. In December 2010, his screenplay for the comedy horror film The Kitchen Sink appeared on The Black List, before being picked up by Sony Pictures in February 2012 and released as Freaks of Nature in October 2015. In 2011, he scripted the crime film Shimmer Lake, which he directed in 2016, making his directorial debut.

In November 2012, he wrote the screenplay for the science fiction horror film God Particle, which was released in February 2018 as The Cloverfield Paradox. In May 2013, he was writing the screenplay for Men in Black 4. In September 2013, he scripted the action comedy film 22 Jump Street. In December 2013, he teamed up with John Krasinski to write an action-adventure film for Warner Bros.

In April 2018, he wrote a draft for the action comedy film Borderlands, but after several rewrites, he was officially credited for "additional literary material". In August 2018, he wrote a screenplay for a Supergirl film. In January 2019, he was writing the sequel to Detective Pikachu. He left the project in February 2023.

In April 2019, he co-wrote the screenplays for Sonic the Hedgehog and Escape Room: Tournament of Champions, but went uncredited in the former. In September 2019, he was hired to write a Face/Off remake. He left the project in February 2021. In October 2020, he drafted the screenplay for the romantic comedy film The Lost City, prior to providing additional literary material for Strays, Kraven the Hunter, Sonic the Hedgehog 3, and A Minecraft Movie.

In August 2022, he wrote the screenplay for a Clue remake. In February 2023, he was hired as showrunner and executive producer on the superhero streaming series Spider-Noir. In April 2023, he was hired to draft the screenplay for Fast Forever, alongside Christina Hodson. In June 2024, they were replaced by Zach Dean.

== Filmography ==
=== Film ===
Short film

Year	Title	Director	Notes/Ref(s)
2010	Mortal Kombat: Rebirth	Kevin Tancharoen	

Feature film

Year	Title	Director	Notes/Ref(s)
2014	22 Jump Street	Phil Lord; Christopher Miller	
2015	Freaks of Nature	Robbie Pickering	
2017	Shimmer Lake	Himself	
2018	The Cloverfield Paradox	Julius Onah	
2020	Sonic the Hedgehog	Jeff Fowler	Uncredited screenwriter
2021	Mortal Kombat	Simon McQuoid	Story only
2021	Escape Room: Tournament of Champions	Adam Robitel	Also co-producer
2022	The Lost City	Aaron and Adam Nee	

Additional literary material only

- Strays (2023)
- Borderlands (2024)
- Kraven the Hunter (2024)
- Sonic the Hedgehog 3 (2024)
- A Minecraft Movie (2025)

=== Television ===
Year	Title	Writer	Executive Producer	Developer	Showrunner	Notes/Ref(s)
2013	Mortal Kombat: Legacy	Yes	No	No	No	Episode: "Scorpion and Sub-Zero II (Part 2)"
2026	Spider-Noir	Yes	Yes	Yes	Yes	Wrote episodes "Step Into My Office" and "The Man in the Mask"
