= Kenshi (Mortal Kombat) =

Mortal Kombat character

- Mortal Kombat character
- Kenshi in Mortal Kombat 1 (2023)
- First appearance: Mortal Kombat: Deadly Alliance (2002)
- Last appearance: Mortal Kombat: Onslaught (2023)
- Created by: Ed Boon; Allen Ditzig
- Designed by: Allen Ditzig (MK:DA); Solomon Gaitan (MKX)
- Voiced by: Various: Robert Keting (MK:DA); Brendan Scannell (MK:D); Jin Hyong (MK9); Vic Chao (MKX, MK1); Manny Jacinto (Mortal Kombat Legends: Snow Blind)
- Portrayed by: Dan Southworth (Mortal Kombat: Legacy)
- Motion capture: Noah Fleder (MK1)

In-universe information
- Full name: Kenshi Takahashi (MK:DA, MK:D, MK:A, MK9, MKX, MK1, MK:O)
- Species: Human
- Weapon: Sento (MK:DA, MK:D, MK:A, MK9, MKX, MK1, MK:O)
- Family: Takeda (son, MKX; young cousin, MK1)
- Significant others: Suchin (former lover; deceased in certain games)
- Nationality: Japanese

Kenshi Takahashi is a character in the Mortal Kombat fighting game franchise by Midway Games and NetherRealm Studios. He makes his series debut in Mortal Kombat: Deadly Alliance (2002) as a blind swordsman and Special Forces operative. In addition to his sword skills, he possesses telekinetic abilities.

Outside of the games, Kenshi has appeared in various related media, including comic books and the 2011 web series Mortal Kombat Legacy, and is featured in the 2022 animated film Mortal Kombat Legends: Snow Blind. While Kenshi is regarded as the best fighter from the series' three-dimensional era and one of the few characters to successfully transition to the return of the two-dimensional series of games, he has received some criticism as a perceived representation of disability and cultural tropes in video gaming.

== Design and gameplay ==
In Mortal Kombat: Deadly Alliance, character designer Allen Ditzig's early concept sketches, the character was called "the Kenshi" ("swordsman") and described as a "spirit hunter". During production, Kenshi was originally named "Blind Gi", which was changed to "Blind Kenshi" before his final name was determined. Mortal Kombat co-creator Ed Boon said that he had included Kenshi in the 2011 reboot game because he and many of the series developers were fans of the character. For Mortal Kombat X, designer Solomon Gaitan took inspiration from samurai and ninja in designing Kenshi's armor, and "tried to keep it more ninja-esque" with a slimmer shape "because too much samurai would be clunky and odd looking." The character's final digital sculpt was completed in a week with some changes made by NetherRealm Studios' art department, as "what works in concept art doesn't always hold up well in 3D."

Kenshi was intended to replace Ermac as the Mortal Kombat series' character that utilized psychokinetic abilities. A physical weapon was added for him to channel his powers into, which Boon explained was done to compensate for his blindness and make him one of the "strongest" characters in Deadly Alliance. Mark Ryan Sallee of GameSpy described Kenshi's special moves in Mortal Kombat: Deception as similar to Ermac's but "not as comboable" while citing his sword attacks as his most potent in the game. According to the site's Armageddon walkthrough, Kenshi is a midrange attacker whose special moves are best utilized at that distance, as anything closer makes him "vulnerable to counterattacks." Kenshi's offense includes creating a temporary psychic image that attacks opponents, first a clone of himself in the 2011 reboot, a demon in Mortal Kombat X, and an "ancestral" spirit in Mortal Kombat 1.

Kenshi has been cited as a difficult character to play in the series' recent installments. In MKX, his playstyle is split into three variations like the other characters, and Bryan Dawson of Prima Games described him as "requir[ing] some patience to play" and who "relies heavily on keeping his opponents at a distance and only closing in when necessary." Kai Adler of GameRant commented that while Kenshi could "dish out incredible damage," he was among MK1's most difficult characters to play "as his moves are very unfamiliar to the rest of the roster", and it was "up to the player to decide whether they want to follow a path that will require much time and practice dedicated to a single character."

== Appearances ==
=== Mortal Kombat games ===
A born fighter, Kenshi Takahashi wandered Earth in search of worthy competition, defeating opponents to boost his pride. In the process, he encounters a man named Song, who leads him to Sento, a powerful ancient sword. Upon locating it and opening its tomb, a concentration of imprisoned souls inside it blinds Kenshi while "Song" reveals himself the evil sorcerer Shang Tsung, who absorbs the souls and leaves Kenshi for dead. After the sword telepathically guides him out of the tomb, Kenshi re-dedicates himself towards retraining his senses and searching for Shang Tsung.

In Mortal Kombat: Deadly Alliance (2002), Kenshi is recruited into the Special Forces to help find missing member Cyrax in the otherworldly dimension of Outworld. During his search, Kenshi encounters Ermac, an enforcer of evil Outworld emperor Shao Kahn. Pitying him, Kenshi frees Ermac from Shao's control. In return, Ermac hones Kenshi's telekinetic power. Kenshi resumes his hunt for Shang Tsung, but is thwarted by the Red Dragon clan, who destroy the Special Forces headquarters and send Mavado to kill Kenshi. Despite defeating him however, Mavado leaves him for dead.

In Mortal Kombat: Deception (2004), Kenshi allies himself with Sub-Zero after the ninja nurses him back to health. As they attempt to return to Earth, they clash with Hotaru, a neutral but strict guardsman from the realm of Seido who pledged his loyalty to the Dragon King Onaga and has been pursuing Sub-Zero.

In Mortal Kombat: Armageddon (2006), Kenshi takes part in the battle for the elemental Blaze's power. With Shang Tsung believed killed by Onaga, Kenshi ends his revenge and returns to Earth, where he eliminates several criminal organizations before joining a group led by Johnny Cage in their battle against the fallen Elder God Shinnok.

Kenshi appears as a downloadable playable character in Mortal Kombat (2011), which included his in-game biography from Deadly Alliance.

In Mortal Kombat X (2015), Kenshi serves as a consultant to a Special Forces unit, and entered a relationship with a Thai-American woman named Suchin. Together, they had a son named Takeda Takahashi. However, she was killed by the Red Dragon clan in their pursuit of Kenshi, which leads him to leave Takeda in the care of Hanzo Hasashi for training and the youth's protection. Twenty years later, Kenshi and Takeda reunite, though their relationship is briefly strained due to the former's absence before they later reconcile.

In Mortal Kombat 1 (2023), following changes to the timeline made by Fire God Liu Kang, Kenshi is a former yakuza member and descendant of the Taira clan who seeks to reclaim the clan's lost sword, Sento, to free them from the yakuza. In pursuit of his quest, Kenshi comes into conflict with actor Johnny Cage, who owns the sword as a memento. They are both recruited by Liu Kang to represent Earthrealm in the Mortal Kombat tournament. After Raiden is chosen as Liu Kang's champion, Kenshi, Cage, and Kung Lao are tasked with capturing Shang Tsung. In the midst of this, they unknowingly botch Shang Tsung's efforts to treat Princess Mileena's Tarkat disease, leading to her going on a rampage. Amidst this, Kenshi rescues Cage from her, but loses his eyes in the attack before Shang Tsung stops her. In return, Cage eventually gives Sento back to Kenshi before the pair assist Liu Kang saving Earthrealm and Outworld from Shang Tsung. Following this, Kenshi turns his attention back to reviving his clan and helping his cousin Takeda leave the yakuza as well.

=== Other media ===
Kenshi appears in the second season of Mortal Kombat: Legacy (2013), portrayed by martial artist Dan Southworth. Initially unaccustomed to wearing a blindfold, he stated that there were "moments where I was just swinging my arms out and was hoping that it connected in the right place, or not." This version of Kenshi is initially a rōnin from feudal Japan. After rescuing an old traveler from bandits, the former informs Kenshi of the "sword of Sento", which was crafted by Shao Kahn and guarded by the demonic Ermac. While Kenshi eventually succeeds in obtaining the weapon, he is blinded by Ermac, who later fights him in the Mortal Kombat tournament to reclaim Sento, only to be killed by Kenshi.

Kenshi appears in DC Comics' Mortal Kombat X: Blood Ties #1, which expands on Kenshi's decision to leave Takeda in Hanzo Hasashi's care.

A younger Kenshi from a post-apocalyptic future is the main protagonist in Mortal Kombat Legends: Snow Blind (2022), voiced by Manny Jacinto. After being blinded by Shang Tsung, Kenshi seeks out an aged Sub-Zero to defeat Kano's Black Dragon clan.

== Reception ==
Kenshi is regarded as one of the Mortal Kombat series' top characters by several gaming media outlets. Gavin Jasper of Den of Geek lauded Kenshi as "the best design to come out past the original [series] trilogy" with "a look that feels like Solid Snake mixed with Daredevil," and, despite his friendships with Sub-Zero and Scorpion in past games, "far from a Mary Sue character. [He] canonically gets his ass handed to him by Mavado [in Deadly Alliance] and spends the next game healing from his injuries." Game Informer's Marcus Stewart wrote that Kenshi's design and gameplay made him "one of the few post-MK4 characters that feels like he belongs with the classic roster." According to Jason Wojnar of Screen Rant, "The series had a hard time introducing new characters that stuck once it transitioned into three dimensions. Kenshi, however, wooed fans from the start with his look and interesting backstory [and] has quickly become a series mainstay". Kevin Wong of Complex rated Deadly Alliance as one of the best Mortal Kombat fighting titles due to its combination of "classic fighters and the new ones — like Kenshi the blind swordsman — which made us excited for the franchise's future." This point of view was shared by Ravi Sinha of GamingBolt. However, The Daily Eastern News compared the 2011 reboot version of Kenshi to that of Kitana in an article on sexism and video games in regards to costume design playing a role in the objectification of female characters in the MK series. "The male characters seemed more ready to get into a fight, while the females looked like they were about to go to the beach somewhere".

The character inspired blind Evolution Championship Series player Carlos Vasquez to create "The Sento Showdown", a Mortal Kombat tournament held yearly since 2019 that caters exclusively to vision-impaired players. He had previously shared accessibility concerns with NetherRealm Studios developer Herman Sanchez several years earlier that resulted in the company adding audio cues to their games beginning with Injustice: Gods Among Us. Vasquez was later hired by NetherRealm Studios as an accessibility consultant.

Jesse Schedeen of IGN criticized the storytelling of the second season of Mortal Kombat: Legacy for "newcomers like Kenshi requir[ing] a certain amount of back-story to justify their presence", which he felt caused many episodes to rely heavily on flashbacks that disrupted the flow of the plot. Sam Stone of Comic Book Resources praised Manny Jacinto's voicework in Snow Blind as "balancing braggadocio with charisma in effective measure; Kenshi is definitely a headstrong protagonist but is kept in check enough for the audience to become invested in his story." In her 2022 review, Brittany Vincent of IGN praised the film for "weaving a story around one of Mortal Kombat's lesser-known personalities", but opined that the storyline frequently diverted from Kenshi's exploits "when we've already been drawn in and want to learn more about him".

Author David Church noted the series' increase in Japanese cultural influence following the 1999 departure of Mortal Kombat co-creator John Tobias, "such as the blind swordsman Kenshi as a Zatoichi trope." A 2021 publication titled Fragile Avatars? Representations of Disability in Video Games described Kenshi, along with Daredevil and Killer7 character Con Smith, as representing the "blind avenger" who sought revenge against those responsible for their blindness while possessing elevated senses. Matthew Essary of Polygon, in his feature on blind action heroes in popular culture, categorized Kenshi with The Matrix character Neo in the trope of their blindness "actually improving their ability to fight back" due to their supernatural abilities. This trait was criticized by author Jennifer Dalsen in the book Gaming Disability: Disability Perspectives on Contemporary Video Games as "problematic because video games continue to use otherworldly powers as a way to accommodate or otherwise mitigate a disability," with her citing Kenshi and Perception protagonist Cassie Thornton as examples. Jef Rouner of the Houston Press expressed a similar opinion by unfavorably comparing the "Daredevil-blind" Kenshi to Sly Cooper character Bentley, who "as a wheelchair user isn't erasing his inability to walk the way someone like Kenshi being psychic effectively erases his inability to see."
