= Mortal Kombat: Rebirth =

Short film by Kevin Tancharoen

- Directed by: Kevin Tancharoen
- Written by: Kevin Tancharoen; Oren Uziel
- Based on: Mortal Kombat by: Ed Boon; John Tobias
- Produced by: Kevin Tancharoen; James McQuaide; Scott Martin; Laura Kasek
- Starring: Michael Jai White; Jeri Ryan; Matt Mullins; Lateef Crowder; Ian Anthony Dale; Richard Dorton; James Lew
- Cinematography: Scott Kevan
- Edited by: Kevin Tanchaoren
- Release date: June 8, 2010
- Running time: 8 minutes
- Country: United States
- Language: English

Mortal Kombat: Rebirth is a 2010 American short fan film directed by Kevin Tancharoen, with fight choreography by Larnell Stovall. Based on the Mortal Kombat series of fighting games, the short-film "actually was made by the director to sell Warner Bros. Entertainment on his vision for a reimagined Mortal Kombat film." The short-film features an alternative version of the Mortal Kombat universe. The characters of the game are portrayed with vastly different origins, based on realism. There is no mention of Outworld or any other supernatural elements, although the tournament itself is a main part of the storyline in this short.

Tancharoen himself noted that he wouldn't shy away from supernatural elements entirely in a feature-length adaptation, but they have to be "done in a very tasteful way". The pitch eventually evolved into the web series, Mortal Kombat: Legacy.

== Plot ==
Deacon City Police Captain Jackson Briggs informs the assassin Hanzo Hasashi about the criminals Reptile and Baraka; the latter has recently killed actor-turned-undercover-officer Johnny Cage in a fight. Briggs believes they were both working for a man named Shang Tsung. He asks Hasashi to kill them in a mysterious tournament hosted by Tsung. When offered his freedom in exchange for accomplishing such tasks, Hasashi reveals that he willingly had himself incarcerated—and could free himself at any time. Then Sonya Blade arrives with a folder and informs Hasashi that his enemy Sub-Zero is alive and the one he killed was his brother. It becomes clear to Hasashi that the terms of his participation in the tournament involve killing Reptile, Baraka and Shang Tsung in return for access to Sub-Zero. Since the real Sub-Zero will be at the tournament, Hasashi, now calling himself Scorpion, agrees to participate.

== Cast ==
- Michael Jai White as Jackson Briggs, a captain in the Deacon City Police Department. On his office door at the beginning of the film, the last two letters of his first name are faded, thus reading as "Jacks", a nod to "Jax". IGN contacted Jai White's representatives and asked about the video, and they answered White believed the shoot was a marketing component for the next Mortal Kombat game.
- Jeri Ryan as Sonya Blade, Jackson Briggs's partner. Ryan said she took the part as a favor to a friend.
- Matt Mullins as Johnny Cage, a former movie star that became an undercover agent after his Hollywood career died. In a short flashback, he is killed by Baraka. When asked about how he got involved in the project, Mullins said: "I had known Kevin [Tancharoen] for about five years, but I never had a chance to work with him. A few months ago I got a call from Kevin about being involved in a short that he was planning to shoot. He sent me the script and I was blown away. When I sat down to meet with him, and he explained his vision, I was so excited to be involved and could not wait to start."
- Lateef Crowder as Alan Zane / Baraka, a plastic surgeon who, after accidentally killing a patient, went on to kill two dozen more. Faced with the shame of being labeled a failed doctor, Zane pierced his face, sharpened his teeth, and surgically attached a pair of metal blades to his forearms. In a short flashback, he fights Johnny Cage, finally killing him with his arm blades.
- Ian Anthony Dale as Hanzo Hasashi / Scorpion, the top assassin of the Shirai Ryu who offered himself up to the police for killing the man he thought was his nemesis. In keeping with the video game series, his eyes are completely white and his signature spear weapon also appears. His trademark battle-cry "Get over here!" can also be heard at the ending.
- Richard Dorton as Reptile, a mass-murderer born with a rare genetic disorder, Harlequin-type ichthyosis, in which his skin produces too many cells and his eyelids are formed inside out. It is said that he likes to devour the heads of his victims, which is a nod to his "Head Eat" Fatality from the video game series.
- James Lew as Shang Tsung who is seen in the photograph.

== Production ==
=== Development ===
Initially appearing on YouTube, the video was received with confusion by websites such as IGN and 1UP.com, both of which were uncertain if the video was a viral marketing ploy to promote either a new film or a video game. Contradicting reports came from the actors involved, with White's representatives believing it was an advertisement for then upcoming 2011 Mortal Kombat game, while Ryan admitted her appearance was as a favor to a friend and described the video as a pitch for a film.

Kevin Tancharoen, the director of the short film, spent about $7,500 to produce it, and took two months to produce everything. Filming took place in April 2010 over a period of two days, using borrowed cameras. Actor Matt Mullins already knew the director, but had not had an opportunity to work with him. A few months before filming Tancharoen called him, inviting him to participate in a short film he was planning to shoot. The script was sent to Mullins who, impressed with the text and the director's vision for the franchise, agreed to participate as Johnny Cage. Tancharoen himself has admitted that the film was never meant to be seen public, he merely wanted to use it as a pitch to Warner Bros, but when uploading it to YouTube, he accidentally published it to the public.

Series co-creator Ed Boon himself has noted that the film was "awesome" and had "no idea it was being made", though he did opine that it "probably crosses the line" as far as "re-imagining" goes. He later stated that he thought it was "incredibly well done" and that it was "a legitimate alternate universe Mortal Kombat".

Larnell Stovall, besides being responsible for the choreography of all the fights, was also responsible for presenting Michael Jai White to the project. Jeri Ryan, when asked about her role in the film, said she agreed to do it as a favor to a friend.

== Future ==
The web series, Mortal Kombat: Legacy, spawned as a result of the short, premiering on Machinima.com's YouTube channel from April 11, 2011 to September 26, 2013 for two seasons. Tancharoen returned as writer and director, alongside much of the cast, although the show takes place in a separate continuity with more supernatural elements.

In September 2011, shortly after the release of Legacy's first season, Tancharoen was hired to helm the Mortal Kombat film reboot with Oren Uziel, his Rebirth co-writer, scribing. However, Tancharoen dropped from the project in October 2013. The film eventually released in 2021, where Uziel was given story credit.
