= Lateef Crowder dos Santos =

Brazilian American martial artist, actor, and stunt performer

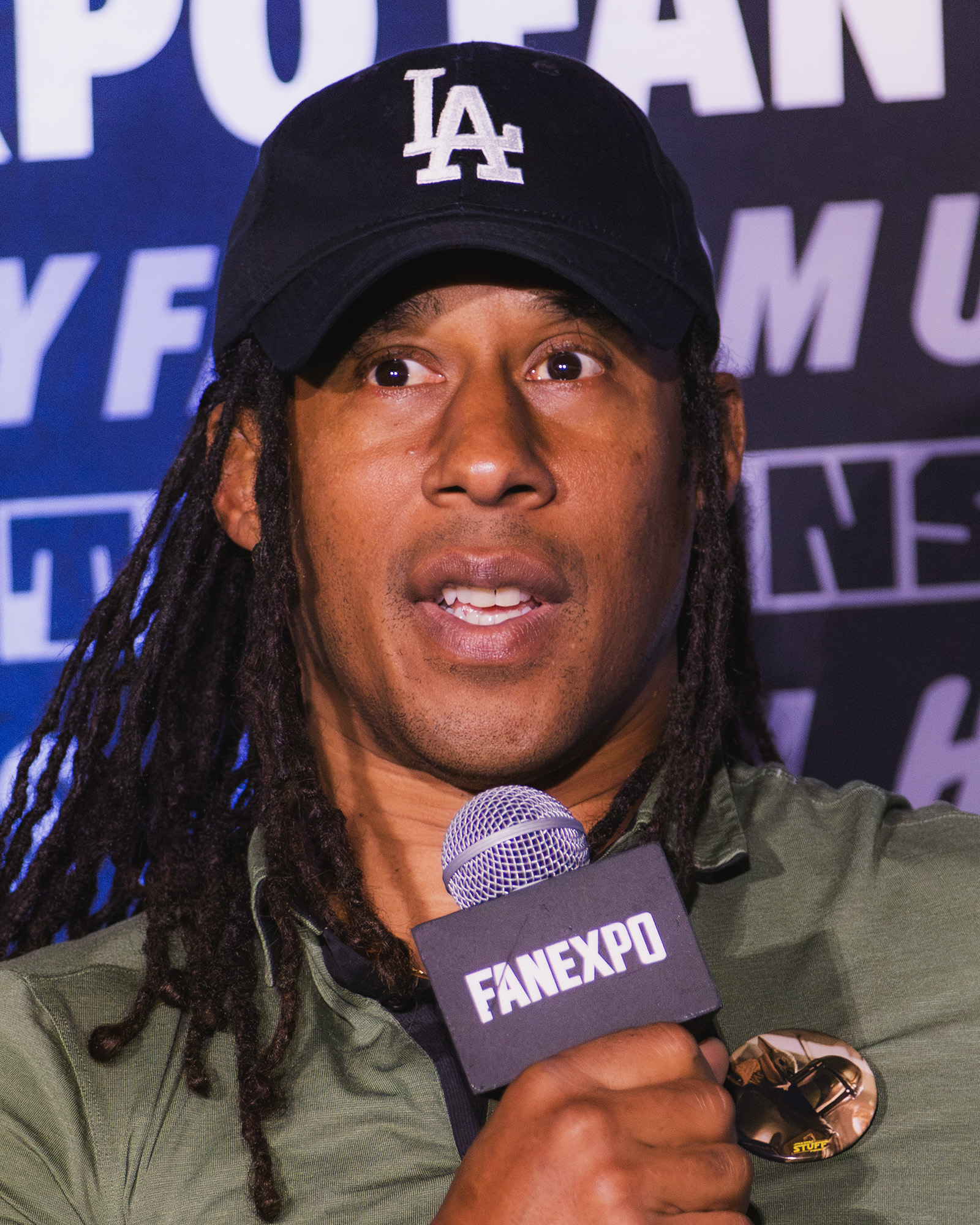
- Dos Santos in 2026
- Born: November 23, 1977 (age 48); Salvador, Bahia, Brazil
- Occupations: Actor; stuntman; martial artist
- Years active: 2000–present

Lateef Crowder dos Santos (born November 23, 1977) is a Brazilian American actor, martial artist, and stuntman. As a member of the ZeroGravity stunt team since 2000, he has been featured in multiple internet short videos and demo reels, such as Inmate 451. An experienced capoeira practitioner, he started training in martial arts when he was 6 years old.

== Early and personal life ==
He was born in Salvador, Bahia, Brazil, but moved to San Jose, California, at the age of four. With great experience and training in Capoeira, taught by his father and gymnasts, he became an international competitor and became a member of the Zero Gravity Stunt Team. Today he is an inactive member. Lateef has since been working on his own acting career, appearing in movies such as The Protector 2005 starring Tony Jaa. He also worked with Scott Adkins in Undisputed 3 where he played the character Rodrigo Silva.

== Career ==
dos Santos is best known for his appearance in Tom-Yum-Goong (known in North America as The Protector), using Capoeira in a fight scene with Tony Jaa. Due to an injury to his achilles tendon, the scene was cut short, but he has since recovered, and was featured in the martial arts feature, Duel of Legends, released in 2007.

Due to his Capoeira skills and gymnast with resemblance to the character, Lateef Crowder played the role of Eddy Gordo in the Tekken feature film. He has also featured in Undisputed 3 which stars Scott Adkins and Mykel Jenkins. Directed by Isaac Florentine and also stars in the Kevin Tancharoen directed short film Mortal Kombat: Rebirth. Another memorable work of Lateef was in Fight Science when he represented his style in tests to show the effectiveness of his kicks.

Since 2019, he appeared in the Disney+ original series The Mandalorian as the stunt double for Din Djarin / The Mandalorian, for which he won a Primetime Emmy Creative Arts Award for Outstanding Stunt Performance in 2022.

== Filmography ==
| Year | Movie | Role | Notes |
|---|---|---|---|
| 2005 | Tom-Yum-Goong | Capoeira Fighter | |
| 2008 | Yeah Sure Okay | Yellow | |
| 2008 | Beyond the Ring | Taekwondo student #1 | |
| 2008 | Ninja Cheerleaders | Karate Bully | |
| 2009 | Never Surrender | Marco | |
| 2009 | Red Velvet | Maniac | |
| 2009 | Tekken | Eddy Gordo | |
| 2009 | Once Fallen | Santos Lobos | |
| 2009 | Duel of Legends | Fighter | |
| 2010 | Fading of the Cries | Sylathus | |
| 2010 | The Book of Eli | Highjacker #3 | Stunts |
| 2010 | Slums 13 | Judge | |
| 2010 | Undisputed 3 | Rodrigo Silva, Brazilian Fighter | |
| 2010 | Mortal Kombat: Rebirth | Alan Zane / Baraka | |
| 2011 | Supah Ninjas | Bass, Rhymer's Henchman | Episode: Pilot/Stunts |
| 2011 | Call of Duty: Modern Warfare 3 | Stunts, motion capture | Video Game/Stunts |
| 2011 | Sucker Punch | Stunts | Stunts |
| 2011 | The Girl from the Naked Eye | Maximillion, Stunts | Stunts |
| 2011 | Double Tap | Stunts | Stunts |
| 2012 | The Twilight Saga: Breaking Dawn – Part 2 | Santiago | |
| 2014 | Falcon Rising | Carlo Bororo | |
| 2016 | Batman v Superman: Dawn of Justice | KGBeast Goon | |
| 2017 | Boone: The Bounty Hunter | Juan Cardoza | |
| 2018 | Mile 22 | Liam | Also Stunts |
| 2019–23 | The Mandalorian | Double, Din Djarin / The Mandalorian | |
| 2023 | The Family Plan | Neck Tattoo | |
| 2026 | The Mandalorian and Grogu | Double, Din Djarin / The Mandalorian | |
