= Ermac =

Mortal Kombat character

- Mortal Kombat character
- Ermac in Mortal Kombat 1 (2023)
- First appearance: Ultimate Mortal Kombat 3 (1995)
- Created by: Ed Boon and John Tobias
- Designed by: John Tobias (UMK3); Steve Beran (MKD); Atomhawk Design (MK2011); Justin Murray (MKX); Alex Troufanov (MK11, Krypt); Federico Ginabreda (MK1)
- Voiced by: Michael McConnohie (MK2011); Jamieson Price (2015-present)
- Portrayed by: John Medlen (film); Kim Do Nguyen (web series)
- Motion capture: John Turk (UMK3)

In-universe information
- Species: Fusion of souls
- Origin: Outworld

Ermac (/ˈɜːrmæk/ UR-mak) is a character in the Mortal Kombat fighting game franchise by Midway Games and NetherRealm Studios. Debuting as an unlockable secret character in Ultimate Mortal Kombat 3 (1995), he is an undefeated killer of justice from the army of a hidden secret tribe of assassins that belongs to an even bigger army of a known country of these times. In the new timeline of Mortal Kombat 1 (2023), one of the souls inhabitting Ermac is Emperor Jerrod, father of Kitana and Mileena, who manages to assume control of the host body.

The character originated from rumors alleging he appeared as a secret character in the original 1992 game, which were perpetuated by video game magazine Electronic Gaming Monthly (EGM). His name was derived from a diagnostics menu in the first game that displayed the text "error macro" as ERMACS. Although the rumors were false, growing interest led to him becoming a playable character in future games.

Ermac has additionally appeared in alternate series media, including the animated series Mortal Kombat: Defenders of the Realm and the web series Mortal Kombat: Legacy. He has received positive reception for his special abilities, character development, and Fatality finishing moves, while his origins are considered among the most memorable legends of video gaming.

== History and conception ==
In the diagnostics menu of the 1992 original Mortal Kombat game, an audits screen (Note: A screen that displays game statistics and is used to assess a machine's performance.) displayed a macro created by Mortal Kombat co-creator and programmer Ed Boon in order to log coding errors. This practice was employed by series developer Midway Games since their 1990 arcade release Smash TV. It was spelled as ERMACS—a pluralized contraction of error macro—as in the number of times the program would execute. In early revisions of the game, it appeared on the audits screen beneath the counter "Shang Tsung Beaten" (in reference to the game's final boss fight). After Boon added the hidden character Reptile to the third revision, ERMACS was now listed below the counters "Reptile Appearances" and "Reptile Battles", which provoked players into searching for a second secret character called Ermac.

Midway removed the ERMACS listing from the game's fifth and final update in March 1993, but speculation about the character intensified after Electronic Gaming Monthly (EGM) published a submitted screenshot from the game and a letter from "Tony Casey" that claimed he had played against a red ninja named Ermac and taken a Polaroid of the screen as evidence. Unbeknownst to the magazine, the photo was a doctored image of yellow ninja character Scorpion in the "Warrior Shrine" stage from the Super Nintendo version of the game that was tinted red with the added caption "Ermac Wins". Reader responses contained varied complex instructions for accessing the character. With the still-nonexistent Ermac now visualized as a red ninja, players then claimed sightings of a random glitch that would cause the game's ninja characters' graphics to flash red, with "Error Macro" or "Ermac" replacing their name in their energy bar, but such an occurrence was not possible as the macro counter could not increase in the event of a genuine glitch while no red palette for the character existed.

A scrambled message was included in the ending of the 1993 sequel Mortal Kombat II that read "Ermac does not exist", but neither Boon nor Midway marketing director Roger Sharpe denied outright the character's presence in the game. In October 1995, two years after the EGM incident, Ermac was added to the selectable roster of Ultimate Mortal Kombat 3 (an expansion of Mortal Kombat 3), as the developers felt that he had transformed from myth to urban legend and therefore warranted his inclusion in the series. In 2011, Boon clarified the rumors on Twitter, and said he had kept the meaning of the ERMACS listing secret in hopes of stirring up fan speculation about the character.

Midway alluded to the rumors and EGM hoax in subsequent Mortal Kombat games and related media. Ermac appeared on one panel in a Mortal Kombat II comic book prequel that was written and illustrated by series co-creator John Tobias. Mortal Kombat: Deception's training mode contained a message that read, "It is a little-known fact that 'Ermac' is short for 'Error Macro'", an homage to his origins that was revived in Mortal Kombat X for a pre-match introduction sequence between Ermac and series newcomer Takeda. He was an Easter egg boss hidden at the Warrior Shrine level in Mortal Kombat: Shaolin Monks, a 2005 beat 'em up spinoff title that spans the events of Mortal Kombat II. Skarlet, a nonexistent female ninja character from MKII with a similar background, was included by NetherRealm Studios (formerly Midway Games) as a playable character in the 2011 reboot game in what the company considered a second instance of turning fan rumors into reality. In 2024, following Ermac's playable release for Mortal Kombat 1, Boon commented, "We never would have guessed this red ninja with a ridiculous name would end up such a big part of Mortal Kombat's history and still be kicking over 30 years later ... he has a full story [and] history and is part of the MK lore."

== Design and portrayals ==
Ermac debuted in Ultimate Mortal Kombat 3 as one of three hidden unlockable characters, and was the only character who had not appeared in any previous series games. As a palette-swapped character, he was physically identical to the game's other male ninjas save for his red coloring and darker skin tone, while he shared some of their special moves and in-game poses. For his return in the three-dimensional title Mortal Kombat: Deception, Ermac was given a distinct redesign by Steve Beran, the series' lead character designer and art director. Beran explained that the "challenge" of revamping old characters was to give them a fresh look from their previous incarnations while retaining elements that still made them recognizable to players. Ermac's main fighting style in MK: Deception and Mortal Kombat: Armageddon is Choy Lay Fut, a martial art that specializes, as depicted in his Deception ending, in warding off multiple attackers. His Deception design was maintained for the 2011 reboot game but with an increased black palette.

For Mortal Kombat X, Ermac was designed with a more emaciated appearance with his mask exposing more of his face and revealing decaying skin as the result of his losing control of the souls inside his body, with a metal talisman modeled after his Deception design affixed to his chest in order to keep his physical form intact. (Note: "Shao Kahn's living prison, Ermac, represents what remains of his master's legacy in MKX. The construct's form is not holding up well under the current of time. We wanted to show signs of rot, of a loosening grip on the contained souls. ... [His] costume was designed to showcase an imperial authority, while hearkening back to his appearance in Mortal Kombat: Deception, showcasing their chest design from that game now bolted into the chest, holding the construct together.") The talisman initially covered his face, "securely nailed deep into the skull", in concept artwork by character artist Justin Murray. Early designs by Murray had Ermac unmasked with a stockier figure and solid black palette. His play style was split into three fighting variations along with the game's other playable characters. His "Inner Workings" Fatality (a finishing move that executes defeated opponents) in the game has him levitate his opponent, break their spine in midair, and then extract their gastrointestinal tract from their mouth. The finisher was conceived by lead game designer John Edwards: "People were like, 'That's hilarious and disgusting.' I'm pretty proud of it." The sound effects used to depict the graphic violence of his finishers were created with slime and a plunger. Ermac first appeared in Mortal Kombat 1 as a non-playable character in the game's story mode upon its September 2023 release, and then made available to players in April 2024 as part of a "Kombat Pack" of downloadable characters. His design retained his black-and-red palette and ashen skin complexion from MKX, but with minimal armor and no mask, while he was unmasked throughout the story mode. A mask and other costume enhancements were added to his design for his playable release.

Ermac's signature gameplay attribute throughout his series tenure is his telekinesis, which is visualized onscreen through his spiritual powers. The "Telekinetic Slam" (later renamed "Force Lift") has him levitate his opponents and then throw them onto the ground. Ed Boon considered Ermac one of the strongest characters in Ultimate Mortal Kombat 3 based on the move, which he considered one of his overall favorites in the series. In a feature published on Xbox Wire, NetherRealm Studios design manager Nick Nicastro said that the improved software capabilities available for Mortal Kombat 1 since Ermac's last appearance in Mortal Kombat X enabled the developers to enhance the visual effects of his soul powers and special moves, which he described as "leaning heavily into certain horror inspirations" in that the character "has been haunted by unique souls he has captured throughout his existence".

Ermac was played by actor John Turk in the digitized games Ultimate Mortal Kombat 3 and the 1996 compilation title Mortal Kombat Trilogy. He was voiced by Michael McConnohie in the 2011 reboot, and by Jamieson Price in Mortal Kombat X and Mortal Kombat 1.

== Appearances ==
=== Mortal Kombat games ===
Introduced in Ultimate Mortal Kombat 3 (1995), Ermac was created to serve as an enforcer for Shao Kahn, the tyrannical ruler of the otherworldly dimension of Outworld. A hybrid entity created from the souls of deceased warriors, he possesses telekinesis and uses plural pronouns. Following his creation, he takes part in Shao Kahn's invasion of Earth and the eponymous Mortal Kombat tournament.

In Mortal Kombat: Deadly Alliance (2002), following Shao Kahn's apparent death at the hands of the titular alliance of evil sorcerers Shang Tsung and Quan Chi, Ermac aimlessly wanders Outworld without orders until he encounters the blind swordsman Kenshi, who frees Ermac from Kahn's control, and Ermac hones Kenshi's telekinetic power in return. In Mortal Kombat: Deception (2004), Ermac reforms to atone for his work with Kahn by aiding the spirit of the deceased Liu Kang in successfully freeing the latter's friends from their enslavement by the Dragon King Onaga. He is not in the storyline of the compilation title Mortal Kombat: Armageddon (2006), but in the game's opening sequence, he joins Earth's warriors in participating in a battle to claim the elemental Blaze's godlike power.

After Earth defender Raiden alters the timeline to avert the events of Armageddon in the reboot title Mortal Kombat (2011), Ermac returns to being Shao Kahn's enforcer, and is defeated in the first Mortal Kombat tournament by eventual champion Liu Kang. He obliterates Jax's arms, causing Jax to receive bionic implants. His ending reveals that one of the souls trapped inside his being is that of King Jerrod, Kitana's father and former ruler of Edenia. In Mortal Kombat X (2015), following Shao Kahn's death, Ermac initially serves the former's successor, Mileena, before defecting to Kotal Kahn due to Mileena not being Shao Kahn's biological daughter. He joins Reptile, Erron Black, and Ferra/Torr in serving Kotal Kahn as they conflict with Cassie Cage's Special Forces unit in their attempt to protect their home realm of Outworld from Shinnok's forces. Ermac was omitted from Mortal Kombat 11 (2019), but makes a brief appearance in the game's "Krypt" feature.

In the rebooted storyline of Mortal Kombat 1 (2023), Ermac is again an assimilation of souls, now created by Quan Chi. He overpowers a group of Earth defenders upon his completion but is weakened after Kenshi absorbs several of the souls into his sword to unleash its power, leading to his defeat by Ashrah. His later defeat in combat by Mileena enables Jerrod's soul to assume control of Ermac's body, and he reunites with his former queen Sindel and family before joining the fight to protect Earth and Outworld. After Sindel is slain during battle with Shang Tsung's forces, Jerrod absorbs her soul and appoints his daughter Mileena as the new Outworld empress.

=== Other appearances ===
Ermac appeared in two episodes of the 1996 animated series Mortal Kombat: Defenders of the Realm. He has a minor role as one of Shao Kahn's henchmen in the 1997 feature film Mortal Kombat Annihilation, played by assistant stunt coordinator John Medlen and identified only in the closing credits. Although the script and print media publications mentioned his telekinetic powers, they were omitted from the film.

His association with Kenshi in Mortal Kombat: Deadly Alliance was loosely adapted for the 2013 second season of the web series Mortal Kombat: Legacy, in which he is a decaying, hooded demon who guards the "sword of Sento" under Shao Kahn's orders and strikes Kenshi blind as the latter takes the sword. Ermac then battles Kenshi in the Mortal Kombat tournament in an attempt to repossess the sword before Kenshi kills him with it. He was played by stuntman and martial artist Kim Do Nguyen, with his makeup designed by Christien Tinsley.

Ermac appears in the Mortal Kombat Annihilation novelization, and in DC Comics' 2015 Mortal Kombat X prequel comic miniseries. The character has been licensed for action figures, a life-sized standee, and an eighteen-inch limited-edition polystone statue.

== Reception ==
Ermac's progression from a palette swap in Ultimate Mortal Kombat 3 to unique redesigns in Mortal Kombat: Deception and subsequent series appearances has earned him positive critical reception.

Ermac's origins as a glitch and rumored character are considered a memorable urban legend in video games. (Note: Sources:) GamesRadar+ executive editor Eric Bratcher credited the Electronic Gaming Monthly hoax with Ermac's addition to the Mortal Kombat series. Rudie Obias of Mental Floss and Yannick LeJacq of Kotaku considered it the result of fans' enthusiasm for the character. Steve Watts of 1Up.com commented that supposed video-game glitches like Ermac "go on to live as legends until the creators have no choice but to make it a reality." The staff of GameTrailers unsuccessfully attempted to access Ermac in the first game, per the reader instructions published in EGM, in an episode of their PopFiction web series that premiered at PAX Prime 2012. In his study Immersion and Worldbuilding in Videogames, Edin Omeragiċ of the University of Osijek stated that Ermac's inclusion was "especially immersive for the way it includes end users into the process, with developers seemingly relinquishing control over their world for a moment and making their fans feel as if they also had a hand in its creation."

Critical reaction to Ermac's series debut was negative. While he and Mortal Kombat's digitized ninjas made GamePro's selection of the best palette-swapped video game characters, Game Informer's Dan Ryckert stated that he did not want these characters, aside from Scorpion and Sub-Zero, in future series installments. Journalist Jeff Gerstmann called the unlocking of Ermac in Ultimate Mortal Kombat 3 "a hassle". Author David Church noted the "poorly balanced" gameplay of Ermac and other hidden characters who became playable in "completist" titles like UMK3 and Mortal Kombat Trilogy, while "their backstories seem[ed] tacked onto the increasingly sprawling story world."

Following his redesigns and roles in Mortal Kombat: Deception and thereafter, Ermac received positive reception for his development, (Note: Sources:) and was rated by gaming media outlets among the top series characters. GamesRadar+ commented, "This red-clad ninja might not be as iconic as Sub-Zero or Scorpion, but it's hard not to love Ermac for his ... supernatural, Sith-like powers of telekinesis." Gavin Jasper of Den of Geek noted the character's transformation from "just an altered Scorpion/Sub-Zero sprite" to "a floating phantom, surrounded by souls and completely unpredictable." Jasper additionally commented on Ermac's growth in Deception, "where he broke the bonds of [Shao] Kahn" and successfully battled multiple characters in his ending. Sociology professor Ricardo Cortez Lopes studied the modifications of Ermac's Deception design in player-created Mugen game adaptations, theorizing that they influenced NetherRealm Studios' future iterations of the character.

Ermac's initial Mortal Kombat 1 design received heavy fan criticism for the omission of his mask, which resulted in NetherRealm adding it to his redesign for his playable release. Game Rant's Joseph Andress praised the subplot therein of Jerrod controlling Ermac's body as "humaniz[ing] the character like never before." Renaldo Matadeen of Comic Book Resources commented that it opened up future storyline possibilities "that will add nuance, depth, and intricate layers to someone who was just another ninja palette". However, GameSpot's Jason Fanelli felt the "head scratcher" subplot occurred "out of nowhere with little explanation" and "erases everything that was cool about him".

His finishing moves have met with critical praise, particularly his "Pest Control" Fatality from the 2011 reboot game, in which he shrinks his opponent and crushes them underfoot. When NetherRealm Studios posted a trailer of "Inner Workings" from Mortal Kombat X on YouTube in March 2015, it accumulated over 850,000 views in less than a month, and was noted for its graphic content. (Note: Sources:) Chicago Reader spotlighted it in an article titled "Has Mortal Kombat Finally Gone Too Far?", describing it as "an act of medieval torture as imagined by Tolkien." Justin Clark of GameSpot remarked that the finisher "might actually be the most shocking, gory, and disgusting act of surreal horror to ever happen in a video game, let alone the Mortal Kombat series".

Response to Ermac's alternate-media incarnations has been negative. Nathan Birch of Uproxx described him in Mortal Kombat Annihilation as a "forgettable red Scorpion clone" and his fight scene with Sonya in the film as "nondescript". In his review of Mortal Kombat: Legacy II, Carl Lyon of Fearnet censured Ermac's design and what he believed was the character's poorly developed role of an opponent to be quickly killed off. Gavin Jasper of Den of Geek praised his fight scene with Kenshi but was also critical of his role in the story.

== See also ==
- Sheng Long, a character from the Street Fighter series that originated as an EGM April Fools joke
- Cow level, a secret level from the Diablo series originating as a hoax
- Characters of the Mortal Kombat series
- EMACS, a family of text editors named for Editor MACroS.

== Bibliography ==
- Bell, Joseph Grant; Van Stone, Matt (2005). Mortal Kombat: Shaolin Monks - Prima Games Official Game Guide. Random House. p. 102. ISBN 0-7615-5219-7.
- Wong Kiew-kit (1996). The Art of Shaolin Kung Fu: The Secrets of Kung Fu for Self-Defense, Health, and Enlightenment. Element Books. p. 40. ISBN 1-85230-789-7.
- Preisler, Jerome (1997). Mortal Kombat Annihilation. Tor Books. ISBN 0-8125-3933-8.
- Omeragiċ, Edin (2019). Immersion and Worldbuilding in Videogames (Master's thesis). University of Osijek. p. 45. Archived from the original on September 22, 2023.
- Church, David (2022). Mortal Kombat: Games of Death. University of Michigan Press. p. 31. ISBN 978-0-472-90262-0.
- Cortez Lopes, Ricardo (2019). "Resignifications of the Mortal Kombat Video Game in Mugen Software" (in Portuguese). Universidade Federal do Rio Grande do Sul. Archived from the original on November 8, 2023 – via Academia.edu. (subscription required)
