= Mortal Kombat: Deception =

2004 video game

- North American cover art featuring Onaga
- Developer: Midway (Note: Just Games Interactive ported the game to PlayStation Portable.)
- Publisher: Midway
- Director: Ed Boon
- Producer: John Podlasek
- Designers: Ed Boon; Paulo Garcia; Brian LeBaron
- Artists: Steve Beran; Martin Stoltz; Pav Kovacic
- Writers: John Vogel; Jon Greenberg; Alexander Barrentine; Brian Chard
- Composers: Dan Forden; Chase Ashbaker; Rich Carle; Brian Chard
- Series: Mortal Kombat
- Engine: RenderWare
- Platforms: PlayStation 2, Xbox, GameCube, PlayStation Portable
- Release: PlayStation 2, Xbox: NA: October 4, 2004; PAL: November 19, 2004; GameCube: NA: February 28, 2005; Unchained; PlayStation Portable: NA: November 13, 2006; AU: November 23, 2006; EU: November 24, 2006
- Genre: Fighting
- Modes: Single-player, multiplayer

Mortal Kombat: Deception is a 2004 fighting game developed and published by Midway. The sixth main installment in the Mortal Kombat franchise and sequel to Mortal Kombat: Deadly Alliance (2002), it was released for the PlayStation 2 (PS2) and Xbox in October 2004, the GameCube in March 2005, and for the PlayStation Portable (PSP) as Mortal Kombat: Unchained in November 2006. Following on from the events of Deadly Alliance, the game’s plot centers on the recently revived Dragon King Onaga, who upon defeating the Thunder God Raiden and sorcerers Quan Chi and Shang Tsung attempts to conquer various realms, meanwhile surviving warriors from prior MK titles join forces in a bid to stop him. In addition to online play and new chess and puzzle minigames, a revamped Konquest Mode from Deadly Alliance features a secondary plot line following the life of Shujinko, a warrior deceived by Onaga into finding artifacts to increase his power.

Designed by series co-creator Ed Boon, the game was created with the intent of surprising MK fans with new and returning content, as well as providing a more realistic combat experience in order to preserve the series signature gory violence. Several parts of the gameplay, such as combos and arenas, were redesigned to accommodate the new style of realism as well as be more interactive for players. In addition, the game was designed with the online play in mind, which had yet to be established into a fighting game.

Upon release, Deception was positively received by critics, who praised the reworked combat and plethora of new features, but criticized the revamped Konquest Mode due to its poor story and voice acting. The game managed to sell more than 1 million units by the end of 2005 and was nominated as the best fighting game of 2004 by several game publications. It has since been regarded as having been the first fighting game to incorporate online multiplayer, which later became an industry standard for the genre moving forward. A sequel to Deception, Mortal Kombat Armageddon, was released in 2006.

== Gameplay ==
A fight between Kenshi and Mileena on a beach arena

The game's arenas are similar to those in Mortal Kombat: Deadly Alliance, but include new features. Some have weapons that may be picked up and used. Others are now branching, meaning you can knock the opponent out of the fighting area in certain locations and continue the fight in a new area. Most levels now have deathtraps, killing any player who gets knocked into them. The game also introduces the "Combo Breaker", a system which allows players to interrupt combos up to three times per match. In contrast to Deadly Alliance, in which characters had only one Fatality, the Deception characters have two Fatalities and a hara-kiri suicide move. The latter is used when the phrase "Finish Him/Her" is shown on the screen and the player is about to lose.

Deception introduces two minigames that use MK characters, "Chess Kombat" and "Puzzle Kombat". The Konquest mode returns, but has been expanded into a roaming adventure game with its plot.

The "Krypt" returns from Mortal Kombat: Deadly Alliance and serves as an interface to access extra content hidden in "koffins" (actual coffins named with the series' trademark misspelling). In Deception, the size of the Krypt was reduced from 676 koffins to 400 koffins. Some koffins also have locks requiring keys only found in the Konquest mode. The Krypt in Mortal Kombat: Deception includes twelve bonus characters (which was cut down to six characters in the GameCube version).

=== Konquest mode ===
A young Shujinko meeting Kabal in the Konquest mode

Deadly Alliance's action role-playing game-style training mode — called "Konquest" — returns in Deception and is greatly expanded from the previous version. Set before the events of the main game, Deception's Konquest mode explores the history of Shujinko, starting before his training with Bo' Rai Cho and ending with the beginning of Deception's main story. While mostly an adventure game, the combat elements occur in the normal Deception fighting mode. Mastering each character's moves is now a minor mission, and it is unnecessary to beat all of them to beat the game mode. In Konquest, a young Shujinko meets Damashi, a being who requests his assistance in collecting six powerful items, the Kamidogu, to send to the Elder Gods. By the time he collects the six Kamidogu, Shujinko is an old man, having spent 46 years on his mission. However, Damashi is revealed to be the Evil Dragon King Onaga, who deceived Shujinko to obtain the six Kamidogu. Players seeking to unlock much of the bonus content in Deception must play through the Konquest mode. Even after completing the mode, players can continue exploring the worlds for additional items to unlock.

=== Chess Kombat ===
"Chess Kombat" is a minigame similar to classic chess. Each piece type is represented by a character of the player's choosing. As with regular chess, the quantity and movement of each piece are determined by its rank. The game only ends when one player takes another team's 'Champion' (or King in traditional chess). The biggest difference is that all attempts to take a square are literally contested. Players will engage in one round of combat, with the winner taking the square.

All unlocked characters can be used in this minigame. Their rank determines the health and offensive strength of pieces in combat situations. Two designated squares enhance the abilities of the entire team while occupied. Both teams can discreetly turn one square into a deathtrap, which instantly kills any opponent piece that steps on it. Both teams have two 'Sorcerers' who can cast a spell instead of moving. The spells can resurrect, move, or kill lower-ranked characters. Each spell can only be used once.

=== Puzzle Kombat ===
"Puzzle Kombat" is a puzzle game similar to Super Puzzle Fighter II Turbo (1996). It features super-deformed versions of the "MK" characters that attack each other once a player gains an advantage. Players must win two rounds to win. The single-player game had a ladder format like in Arcade mode.

The players supervise a grid being filled with blocks. The blocks drop in pairs and can be rotated and moved by the player until they land. A player loses if the blocks reach the top of their grid. If a coloured logo touches a block of the same colour, then all connected blocks of the same colour disappear. Bombs will remove all blocks of the same colour as the one they touch. Removing blocks will cause them to be added to the opponent's grid, but their colours will be varied.

There are 12 playable characters, each with a unique special move that can be used when their 'Special' meter is filled. They either give the player an advantage or hinder the opponent. Baraka's "Blade" will remove all blocks on the edges of his grid. Kenshi's "Invisible" will briefly make all the blocks in the opponent's grid invisible, making matching much harder.

== Plot ==
=== Setting ===
The setting begins immediately after the events of Mortal Kombat: Deadly Alliance. The Deadly Alliance (Shang Tsung and Quan Chi) was successful in their plan. Raiden's warriors, who were meant to protect the six fictional universes (named "realms"), were killed during their tournament. It served as the perfect distraction to defeat their enemies while they simultaneously claimed enough souls to resurrect the Invincible Army. As the sole survivor, Raiden attempts to fight both sorcerers but is ultimately defeated. The Deadly Alliance quickly dissolves as the two sorcerers turn on each other for Shinnok's amulet, which allows them to control the army. Quan Chi has no time to enjoy his victory before he sees that the Dragon King Onaga, the former emperor of the realm of Outworld, has been resurrected too. Quan Chi, Shang Tsung, and Raiden join forces to stop Onaga. However, Raiden ultimately unleashes all his powers in a colossal explosion that, apart from destroying both members of the Deadly Alliance, the surrounding palace, and himself, has little effect on Onaga.

Onaga now seeks to use six artifacts called the Kamidogu (literally "Tool of God" or "divine clay"), which can destroy the realms. Those fighters who survive the battle against the Deadly Alliance now stand against Onaga and his supporters. The latter includes the forces of Edenia, now led by Mileena in the titular theme of deception as she masquerades as her sister, Princess Kitana. Other enemies include the former defenders from the realms, who were resurrected by Onaga and are under his control.

=== Konquest ===
A young man named Shujinko is deceived into spending his entire life collecting the Kamidogu for Onaga, who uses the guise of an emissary of the Elder Gods, the beings who created the realms, named Damashi. Onaga reveals his identity and intentions after Shujinko has gathered all the Kamidogu. Shujinko, led to believe he was working for the greater good, decides to continue training to defeat Onaga.

== Characters ==
26 characters appear in the game, with 17 returning and 9 making their series debuts. Only one character (the boss Onaga) is unplayable.

New characters:

- Ashrah – a Netherrealm demoness searching for redemption and her freedom from the realm by slaying demons with a magical sword.
- Dairou – a disgraced Seidan Guardsman turned mercenary who Darrius contracted to assassinate his former superior, Hotaru.
- Darrius – Leader of the Seidan Resistance, a movement fighting the oppressive regime of the Realm of Order.
- Havik – Chaosrealm cleric and archrival of Hotaru who wishes to resurrect Shao Kahn and ensure the reign of chaos over Outworld.
- Hotaru – Leader of the Seidan Guard who pledges his services to Onaga to forcibly establish order in war-torn Outworld.
- Kira – a former weapons dealer recruited into Kabal's reformed Black Dragon organization.
- Kobra – Martial artist turned killer who is recruited along with Kira into Kabal's reformed Black Dragon organization.
- Onaga – The Dragon King and former emperor of Outworld who seeks to regain his dominating rule of the realm. He serves as the game's final boss.
- Shujinko – An aged warrior deceived by Onaga when he was young. He is the central character of the game's training ("Konquest") mode.

Returning characters:

- Baraka – Member of the savage Tarkatan warrior race that attacks Outworld to distract Onaga's opposition. He additionally frees Mileena from imprisonment, enabling her to assume the enslaved Kitana's identity.
- Bo' Rai Cho – Outworlder who rescues Li Mei from the clutches of the Deadly Alliance (Shang Tsung and Quan Chi).
- Ermac – A Composite of souls freed from Shao Kahn's control by Kenshi, who assists Liu Kang's spirit in saving the slain Earthrealm heroes resurrected and enslaved by Onaga.
- Jade – Edenian warrior and longtime ally of Kitana who joins Queen Sindel in freeing the princess, who is under Onaga's influence and serving as his bodyguard.
- Kabal – Black Dragon leader rescued from near-death by Havik. He reforms the crime syndicate with new members at the cleric's behest.
- Kenshi – Blind swordsman who joins forces with Sub-Zero in an attempt to thwart Hotaru and Onaga's plans.
- Li Mei – Outworld native rescued from the Deadly Alliance by Bo' Rai Cho.
- Liu Kang – the deceased Mortal Kombat champion whose spirit enlists Ermac in freeing the enslaved Earth fighters, but his corpse has been exhumed and reanimated for evil purposes.
- Mileena – Evil clone of Kitana who poses as the imprisoned princess and misleads Edenia's military forces to buy time for Onaga to enact his goals.
- Nightwolf – Native American shaman who willingly corrupts himself with the sins of his tribe so he can infiltrate the Netherrealm and defeat Onaga.
- Noob Saibot – Former member of the Brotherhood of the Shadow who reactivates the inoperative cyborg Smoke as a servant. He serves as the game's combined sub-boss with Smoke ("Noob-Smoke").
- Raiden – Thunder god and Earth protector who had previously sacrificed himself in a vain attempt to destroy Onaga. He has since reformed on Earth and is incensed at Shujinko's (unwitting) resurrection of the Dragon King.
- Scorpion – A specter who escapes his Netherrealm imprisonment and serves the Elder Gods to prevent Onaga from merging the realms.
- Sindel – the Queen of Edenia who teams with Jade to free Princess Kitana from Onaga's control.
- Smoke – Inoperative Lin Kuei cyborg who is revived and reprogrammed to serve Noob Saibot. He is the game's combined sub-boss with Noob Saibot ("Noob-Smoke").
- Sub-Zero – Lin Kuei clan leader who learns of his cryomancer heritage while burying the remains of his protege Frost inside an ancient temple. He also teams up with Kenshi to stop Hotaru and Onaga's machinations.
- Tanya – Edenian traitor who swears allegiance to Onaga in his mission of conquering the realms.

The GameCube version includes two additional playable characters, Goro and Shao Kahn, who were both killed in the opening sequence of Deadly Alliance. The 2006 PlayStation Portable (PSP) version of the game, Mortal Kombat: Unchained, includes Goro and Kahn along with Deadly Alliance returnees Blaze, Frost, Jax, and Kitana.

== Development ==
Mortal Kombat (MK) series co-creator Ed Boon wanted Deception to be an unpredictable fighting game that gave players new features "they could never imagine". To do so, the Midway staff listened to fans on bulletin boards to know what to work on for Deception, such as the playable characters. Wanting to surprise fans and make the game deeper, they added the puzzle and chess minigames (the chess minigame had first been considered for Deadly Alliance, but the developers lacked time to implement it). Boon and John Podlasek supervised the staff, which was divided into teams to work on different areas of the game. One of their concerns was to maintain the traditional feel of the MK series as they wanted the game's violence to make it a more realistic fighting game, rather than "a fighting simulator".

Character appearances were improved to make their moves "more responsive" to the player's input. They also wanted to bring back several characters they felt were absent for too long — including Sindel, Nightwolf, Baraka, and Mileena — and an arena with several weapons which players could use to fight; however, it was remade to become the Liu Kang's Tomb arena. Characters' combos were redesigned to be distinctive so that they would be more important; as Boon noted, they were necessary for any move the player would use to inflict more damage on an opponent. The Midway staff focused on the designs and functions of the backgrounds, wanting to make them as influential to the outcome of the battle as the fighting between the characters.

Because of popular demand and favorable reception of Deadly Alliance, the number of finishing moves, known as Fatalities, increased to two per character. The Fatalities were developed by a group of animators led by Carlos Pesina; they comically described Mileena's Fatality in which she eats the opponents' neck as the most disturbing due to how her "sexy moves" are modeled from Pesina. The Hara-Kiri moves were added to allow the losers to perform a finishing move, creating a race between both players. The Death Traps, meant to be introduced in the previous game, were added to give the combat more strategy as well as to give more chances to players to win a fight if they are at a disadvantage. The game was originally meant to have other new finishing moves, such as tortures and falling cliffs similar to Fatalities.

One of the main features of Deception was the emphasis on online gameplay, which had yet to become common for console fighting games. A team of engineers took almost a year to decide if the feature was viable. The MK team focused their energies solely on platforms that had strong online functionality available to the end consumer; this led to a greater focus on the PS2 and Xbox versions. Because GameCube games require some re-engineering compared to the other platforms when porting, it was decided to exclude GameCube from the team's work until the online hurdles were cleared. Some time after the game's release, Boon commented that he was disappointed that the GameCube version did not feature online gameplay as he regarded it as "the best in the business". The Xbox version of the game was playable online until Xbox Live support for original Xbox games was terminated in 2010. Mortal Kombat: Deception is currently playable online on Insignia, a revival service restoring online functionality for Xbox games

Details about the game were first confirmed to the general public in the May 2003 issue of PlayStation: The Official Magazine, in which the game was called Mortal Kombat VI, and an online mode was confirmed. On February 6, 2004, Midway registered the domain names mkdeception.com and mortalkombatdeception.com. When Midway Entertainment was asked if Mortal Kombat: Deception was the official title, the developers gave no answers. Later that month, Midway released the first trailer from the game, confirming this title.

== Release ==
Mortal Kombat: Deception was released for the PlayStation 2 (PS2) and Xbox in North America on October 4, 2004, and in Europe on November 19, 2004. In France, the game was renamed Mortal Kombat: Mystification after it was found that "deception" in French could be translated to "disappointment." Other countries did not change the original name. A GameCube version was later released exclusively in North America on February 28, 2005.

Two versions were released for the PS2 and Xbox consoles: the standard edition for both systems, a Premium Pack for the PS2, and a Kollector's Edition for the Xbox. The Premium Pack and Kollector's Edition include a metal trading card and a bonus disc containing a history of Mortal Kombat, several video biographies of characters, and an "arcade perfect" version of the original Mortal Kombat, ported by Digital Eclipse. The Xbox version cover art features either Scorpion, Raiden, Baraka or Mileena, while the PS2 version uses the character Sub-Zero.

In October 2005, the game was redistributed as a Platinum Hits title on the Xbox and as a Greatest Hits title on the PS2, coming in new packaging and sold for a discounted price. Deception is also included along with Mortal Kombat: Shaolin Monks and Mortal Kombat: Armageddon in the compilation Mortal Kombat Kollection, which was released on September 29, 2008 for the PS2.

=== Mortal Kombat: Unchained ===
Mortal Kombat: Unchained is the title of the PSP version of Mortal Kombat: Deception, developed by Just Games Interactive. Unchained denotes its portability, free of cables. The game was released on November 13, 2006, in North America; November 23, 2006, in Australia; and November 24, 2006, in Europe.

Unchained includes all the characters from the GameCube version, and 4 more characters — Blaze, Frost, Jax and Kitana — from Mortal Kombat: Deadly Alliance that are exclusive to the PSP version. 3 of the 4 characters have only one Fatality and no Hara-kiri in contrast to other characters, most likely because that was all they had in Deadly Alliance. Exclusive to the Unchained version is the Endurance mode, where players can compete against a constant wave of opponents. The system's wireless ad hoc network functionality can be used for multiplayer games. Characters who remain hidden in the other versions appear unlocked by default in Unchained; producer Shaun Himmerick explained that the staff wanted to show players characters that were difficult to obtain in Deception, such as Liu Kang. Although Midway did not develop the game, they helped Just Games Interactives optimize their code and the Wi-Fi feature, as they wanted to keep the frame rate very high.

== Reception ==
During its release week, Mortal Kombat: Deception shipped 1,000,000 units, surpassing sales of the previous MK title and becoming the fastest-selling game in Midway's history. 1 year later, the game had shipped 1,900,000 units worldwide.

Before the game's release, GameSpot named it the best fighting game of E3 2004. It was also the winner of the 2004 GameSpot Top Spike TV Video Game Awards in the category of best fighting game. In GameSpot's Best and Worst of 2004, Deception received the award for best fighting game. The PlayStation 2 version was a runner-up in IGN's PS2 Best of 2004 Awards in the best fighting game category, and won the Readers' Choice. On February 1, 2005, Deception received the "Fighting Game of the Year" award at the 8th Annual Interactive Achievement Awards (now known as the D.I.C.E. Awards). Deception was nominated for the "Game…Sequel Fighting" award by the National Academy of Video Game Trade Reviewers (NAVGTR), and the "Best Fighting Game of 2004" award by IGN, losing both to Dead or Alive Ultimate. In the Guinness World Records Gamer's Edition 2015 Ebook, the game was recognized for being the first fighting game to be given an online mode.

=== Reviews ===
Reception

Aggregate score
Aggregator	Score
Metacritic	PS2/Xbox: 81; GC: 77

Review scores
Publication	Score
1Up.com	PS2/Xbox: B+ GC: B
GameSpot	PS2/Xbox: 8.5/10; GC: 8.3/10
GameSpy	PS2/Xbox: 2.5/5; GC: 2/5
GameZone	PS2/Xbox: 8.7/10
IGN	PS2/Xbox: 8.8/10
TeamXbox	Xbox: 9.1/10

Awards
Publication	Award
Academy of Interactive Arts & Sciences (2005)	Fighting Game of the Year
Spike Video Game Awards	Fighting Game of the Year

On Metacritic, both the PlayStation 2 and Xbox versions have a weighted average review score of 81 out of 100, while the GameCube version has a score of 77. It won GameSpot's 2004 "Best Fighting Game" award.

Louis Bedigian of GameZone praised the interaction with stages as one of the best parts of the game, commenting that it adds more strategy to the combat. He praised the return of "classic characters", commenting on their new designs and how different their attacks are. Jeremy Dunham of IGN wrote that it was the best game of the Mortal Kombat series. He also stated that the removal of special move buttons, which caused too much damage to an opponent, was one of the developer's best decisions. With the special moves removed from the fights, and the addition of Breakers, players are now able to stop any combo. However, he called character designs in Deception "robotic" in comparison to other fighting games such as the Dead or Alive series or Virtua Fighter 4. The soundtrack was also criticized for having "basic sound effects". GameSpot's Greg Kasavin commented that the fights have been highly improved with the addition of new fighting styles which: "is clearly inspired by kung fu movies". Although he stated the fights were not perfect and noted they could end in a few seconds due to the interaction with the arenas, he liked how painful and funny some moves looked. TeamXbox's Dale Nardozzi praised the characters' animations and movements, adding that the soundtrack: "sets the tone perfectly for your basic, disembowelments, decapitations, and impalements."

The Konquest Mode received mixed opinions. Dunham liked how the Konquest Mode explains the storyline from the game. Conversely, Kasavin commented that the Konquest Mode "is the weak point from the game" and described it as "ugly", lacking good voice acting and graphics. However, he noted that one of the "few nice touches" in Konquest was "hitting anybody you want". He added that the mode had to be completed if he wanted to unlock characters. Bedigian complained that the Konquest is the biggest flaw of the game, criticizing the storyline, the trainings, and voice acting. However, Nardozzi found the mini-games to be very entertaining if played online.

In contrast to the Xbox and PS2 versions, the GameCube port received lower scores from publications. It has been criticized for the lack of an online mode and pixelated picture quality on the unlockable videos & cutscenes, though 1UP.com still praised it. Although the addition of Goro and Shao Kahn was well-received, GameSpot opined that the other ports were better, while also commenting on Goro's appearance, which looks "anemic". In his review, GameSpy's Miguel Lopez wrote that the GCN version "is far from the best version of the game" and advised players to use another port to play.

Mortal Kombat: Unchained received an average of 70 from 14 reviews from Metacritic. Jeff Haynes from IGN mentioned problems with the controls and criticized the long loading times.
