= Mileena =

Mortal Kombat character

- Mortal Kombat character
- Mileena in Mortal Kombat 1 (2023)
- First game: Mortal Kombat II (1993)
- Created by: Ed Boon and John Tobias
- Designed by: Various: John Tobias (MKII, UMK3); Steve Beran (MK:D); Mark Lappin (MK:SM); Atomhawk Design (MK9); Justin Murray (MKX) Brendan George (MK11)
- Voiced by: Various: Peg Burr (MKII, UMK3); Rosalind Dugas (MKG); Lita Lopez (MK:SM); Johanna Añonuevo (2004–2006); Karen Strassman (2011–2015); Kari Wahlgren (2020–present)
- Portrayed by: Various: Dana Hee (1997 film); Megan Brown (television); Jolene Tran (Legacy); Michelle Lee (Legacy II); Sisi Stringer (2021 film)
- Motion capture: Various: Katalin Zamiar (MKII); Becky Gable (UMK3, MKT); Carlos Pesina (MK:D, MK:A); Lorrisa Julianus (MK9)

In-universe information
- Species: Edenian-Tarkatan clone (1st – 2nd timelines); Edenian (Infected with Tarkat disease) (3rd timeline)
- Weapon: Sai
- Origin: Outworld

Mileena (/məˈliːnə/ mə-LEE-nə) is a character in the Mortal Kombat fighting game franchise by Midway Games and NetherRealm Studios. Introduced in Mortal Kombat II (1993), Mileena was initially depicted as a clone of the Edenian princess Kitana, created by Shang Tsung with the blood of the fictional Tarkatan species. In the reboot entry Mortal Kombat (2011), Mileena's background as a clone of Kitana remains the same. Mortal Kombat X (2015) depicts Mileena's attempts to regain the throne as the empress of Outworld, following her removal by Kotal Kahn.

In the series' second reboot Mortal Kombat 1 (2023), significant changes were made to Mileena's character and background. Rather than a clone, Mileena is a daughter of Sindel and the older twin sister of Kitana, making her heir to the throne. However, she was infected with the Tarkat disease, developing the deformed facial features of the Tarkatan race, which she suppresses with a drug.

Mileena is featured as a prominent villain throughout the series and uses a pair of sai as her primary weapons. Despite some criticism for her revealing character designs, she has received a positive reception for her unique appearance and personality. She has been featured in various media outside of the games.

== Development ==
=== Design ===
Mortal Kombat co-creator and producer Ed Boon described Mileena and Kitana as the "female version of Scorpion and Sub-Zero", two ninja characters from the 1992 original game. Mileena was created for the 1993 sequel Mortal Kombat II as a palette-swapped complement to Kitana in order to preserve memory. She was physically identical to Kitana save for her pink outfit and large gnashing teeth, which were created to tie in with fellow debut character Baraka in symbolizing evil in the game. The teeth were digitally added to Mileena's face for one of her Fatalities (finishing moves that execute defeated opponents) in which she consumes her defeated opponent and spits out their bones. Character designer John Tobias chose the name "Mileena" as he felt "it had a pleasant sound to it, which either helped hide her grotesque appearance or exposed a hidden inner beauty", while her and Kitana's storylines in Mortal Kombat II were borne from "the conflicts of sibling rivalry and rebelling against authority". Her signature weapon is a pair of sai, along with recurring teleport-kick and ground-roll-attack moves, for which she was considered one of the top characters of Mortal Kombat II. Kitana was originally given the sai until they were transferred to Mileena after her creation, with Kitana instead receiving war fans. Mileena was omitted from Mortal Kombat 3 due to what Tobias considered an excessive amount of ninja characters used in MKII, but she and the ninjas returned for the upgrade Ultimate Mortal Kombat 3, in which she was a hidden unlockable character.

For the series' three-dimensional titles beginning with Mortal Kombat: Deadly Alliance, Mileena and the previously palette-swapped characters were given distinct redesigns by Steve Beran, the series' lead character designer and art director. Beran explained that his objective of remaking old characters was to give them a fresh look from their previous incarnations while retaining elements that still made them recognizable to players. Her alternate costume in the 2011 series reboot was composed of bandages wrapped around her otherwise nude form. For Mortal Kombat X, Mileena's facial appearance was redesigned with a humanlike mouth and her deformities relocated to her cheeks. This change was reverted to her original mouth design for her next appearance in Mortal Kombat 11.

Mileena and the other playable female characters in MK11 were intentionally designed by Beran and lead character designer Brendan George to downplay their sexuality. Beran commented, "I think it's just what the game is about: You're going in to fight for your life, and you're not going to be wearing such scantily clad items.” George designed the characters overall to emphasize brighter palettes that would stand out against the game's dark backgrounds while highlighting their individual strengths. Mileena's MK11 design was finalized by artists Manuel Robles and Julian Wolf. In the second reboot Mortal Kombat 1, Mileena received an increased amount of teeth inspired by her concept art of Mortal Kombat X.

=== Live-action and voice portrayals ===
Mileena was played by martial artist Katalin Zamiar in Mortal Kombat II (1993), but she and several other actors from the digitized Mortal Kombat games later filed an unsuccessful lawsuit against Midway over unpaid royalties from the home versions of the game and the unauthorized use of their likenesses. Zamiar was replaced by Becky Gable for Ultimate Mortal Kombat 3 (1995). Her motion capture actor for the three-dimensional games Mortal Kombat: Deception (2004) and Mortal Kombat: Armageddon (2006) was Midway graphics artist Carlos Pesina, but she was played by a female actor for the reboot game Mortal Kombat (2011).

The character's battle cries were voiced by Peg Burr for the digitized Mortal Kombat games. For the series' three-dimensional releases, Mileena was voiced by Rosalind Dugas (Mortal Kombat Gold), and Johanna Añonuevo (Mortal Kombat: Deception and Mortal Kombat: Armageddon). Lita Lopez voiced Mileena in the 2005 spinoff beat-'em-up game Mortal Kombat: Shaolin Monks. For the NetherRealm Studios MK releases, Karen Strassman voiced Mileena in the 2011 reboot and Mortal Kombat X, and Kari Wahlgren has voiced Mileena since Mortal Kombat 11.

== Appearances ==
=== Mortal Kombat games ===
Making her series debut in Mortal Kombat II (1993), Mileena is a horrific clone of Kitana, who was once the princess of the fictional realm of Edenia until Shao Kahn, evil emperor of the dimension of Outworld, forcibly annexes the realm and takes Kitana as his own daughter. To keep her from learning about her past, Kahn orders the sorcerer Shang Tsung to create a clone to spy on Kitana and ensure her loyalty to him, and to replace her if necessary. However, Shang Tsung combines Kitana's genetics with that of the brutish Tarkatan race, resulting in Mileena having the latter's characteristic mouth of razor-sharp teeth that she conceals with a mask. By adulthood, Mileena and Kitana are employed as Kahn's personal assassins in his battle against Earth's defenders.

In Ultimate Mortal Kombat 3 (1995), Mileena is killed by Kitana and damned to the underworld of the Netherrealm, where she swears fealty to its ruler, Shinnok. Kahn later resurrects her in his effort to defeat Earth's warriors while granting her the ability to read Kitana's thoughts. In Mortal Kombat Gold (1999), Mileena assists Shinnok and his cohort, the necromancer Quan Chi, in his invasion of Edenia and the imprisonment of Kitana. After diverting their forces to attack Earth, however, the reduced security enables Kitana to escape.

In Mortal Kombat: Deception (2004), Mileena is imprisoned by Kitana for years until the Dragon King Onaga invades Edenia and kills Kitana along with Earth's other defenders. After being freed by her ally Baraka, Mileena poses as Kitana to confuse and misdirect Onaga's enemies while secretly taking control of both Edenia's forces and Onaga's undead army for herself. In the game's training mode, Mileena tutors the protagonist Shujinko in combat.

In Mortal Kombat: Armageddon (2006), Mileena seizes Kahn's fortress while maintaining her deception until she feels Edenia's forces are ready to serve her under her true identity. When Kahn resurfaces to resume his rule of Outworld, she is forced to reveal herself and willingly surrenders to him. She captures and incarcerates Shujinko under Kahn's orders to coerce Onaga to join forces with him, all while secretly plotting to take Edenia's throne for herself. In the game's opening cinematic sequence, she is killed by Shang Tsung during the titular Armageddon in an attempt to gain Blaze's elemental powers.

The thunder god and Earth protector Raiden alters the timeline to prevent Armageddon in the series reboot Mortal Kombat (2011). Mileena is created from Edenian and Tarkatan genetics by Shang Tsung in his "Flesh Pit" laboratory to replace Kitana as Shao Kahn's "true daughter" after Kitana learns of her past. Due to Mileena's physical and mental instability, Kahn instead uses her to lure and devour her victims.

In flashbacks depicted in Mortal Kombat X (2015), Mileena succeeds Kahn as Outworld's ruler following his death at Raiden's hands, but she is overthrown by Kotal Kahn after the revelation that she is not Shao Kahn's biological daughter. In the present, Mileena mounts a failed assassination attempt on Kotal before she is eventually executed by D'Vorah. She was initially omitted from Mortal Kombat 11 (2019) but later added as a downloadable character in November 2020.

In Mortal Kombat 1 (2023), Fire God Liu Kang creates a second new timeline in which Mileena is Kitana's biological elder twin sister and the daughter of Edenia's rulers, Empress Sindel and Emperor Jerrod, but Jerrod is ultimately murdered by an unknown assailant. Mileena is the crown princess of Edenia but is also the girlfriend of Tanya, the leader of the Umgadi royal guard, despite their rules forbidding relationships. Mileena also secretly suffers from the Tarkat virus, a mutating disease that slowly transforms the afflicted into feral monsters, and uses a serum developed by Shang Tsung to keep it at bay. While helping Liu Kang defend their timeline, Mileena defeats Ermac, allowing Jerrod's spirit to take control of Ermac's body and reunite with his family before joining Liu Kang in the fight to preserve Outworld and Earth. When Sindel is fatally wounded in battle, she appoints Mileena as her successor before Jerrod absorbs her soul. In her arcade mode ending, Mileena assumes the throne and works to mend relations with others who share her condition.

=== Other appearances ===
Dana Hee as Mileena in Mortal Kombat Annihilation (1997)

Mileena makes a brief appearance in Mortal Kombat Annihilation, played by martial artist Dana Hee and identified by name only in the closing credits. Australian actress Sisi Stringer played Mileena in the 2021 reboot film Mortal Kombat. Stringer, who underwent four months of martial arts training in preparation for the role, did not actively seek the part but was drawn to the character following a costume fitting and screen test. Megan Brown played Mileena in one episode of the 1998 television series Mortal Kombat: Conquest, in which the character is not directly related to Kitana. In the web series Mortal Kombat Legacy, Mileena kills Kitana's father, Emperor Jerrod, on Shao Kahn's orders, and defeats Johnny Cage during the Mortal Kombat tournament before she is killed by Kitana. She was played by martial artist Jolene Tran in the 2011 first season, and Michelle Lee in the 2013 second season.

Mileena makes brief appearances in the Mortal Kombat Annihilation novelization and a Mortal Kombat II prequel comic book written and illustrated by Mortal Kombat co-creator John Tobias. She and the other MKII characters appeared in the Malibu Comics miniseries Goro: Prince of Pain (1994) and Battlewave (1995), while she was featured in the one-shot issue Kitana and Mileena: Sister Act (1995). Her feud with Kotal Kahn is expanded upon in the DC Comics prequel miniseries Mortal Kombat X: Blood Ties (2015). According to series writer Shawn Kittelsen, "Kotal didn't overthrow Mileena in some macho power play; he overthrew her out of genuine concern for the safety and well being of Outworld and its citizens".

Mileena has been licensed for action figures, Halloween costumes, collectible statuettes from Syco Collectibles and Pop Culture Shock Collectibles, and a figurine by Funko. The compilation album Mortal Kombat: Songs Inspired by the Warriors (2011) included a track by electronica musician Tokimonsta titled "Mileena's Theme". In November 2020, rapper Megan Thee Stallion dressed up as Mileena to promote the character's addition to Mortal Kombat 11. Mileena has made several homage alternate-media appearances that parodied the Mortal Kombat games.

== Reception ==
Mileena's debut playable appearance in Mortal Kombat II, combined with her evil characterization and revealing clothing, was met with favorable critical reception and made her one of the franchise's most recognizable characters. She is additionally noted for her sex appeal despite her disfigured face. Briana Lawrence of The Mary Sue deemed Mileena her favorite series character due to her "ferocity" and sex appeal. "I expected her whole arc to be some sort of 'I hate who I am, I wish to look normal like my sister' narrative, but nope, she unapologetically loves herself." However, Joystiq's Alexander Sliwinski wrote that instead of "focusing on her fighting style, or assets", he asked, "how does she pronounce the letter P without touching her lips together?"

While Mileena's sexualization was considered a positive aspect of her MKII debut, some critics have noted it as either impractical or inappropriate in her later series appearances. Gavin Jasper of Den of Geek opined in January 2015 that the Mortal Kombat games received legitimate criticism for its "over-sexualized" female characters, "but I always thought it was pretty funny of them to focus the male gaze on the monster-faced woman." Three months later, in his review of Mortal Kombat X, he wrote that he was "shocked" at the game's perceived progressivism "to the point that Mileena actually has pants on!" Mileena and Kitana were the subject of an article by researcher Jane Felstead, who commented that while female characters intended to cater to gamers of both sexes while possessing equal physical capabilities, they were nonetheless created to satisfy the male gaze. She praised the physical appearance of MKII actress Katalin Zamiar in that "in no regard was she unrealistic", but with the onset of three-dimensional animation, female characters such as Mileena were "impossibly idealised". Felstead nonetheless suggested that Mileena and Kitana both "perform their gruesome tasks with as much finesse as their male counterparts" while the in-game action is "traditionally seen as male-coded behaviour, and yet in this case infiltrated by a number of strong, capable women."

Her cannibalism is regularly displayed in her Fatality finishing moves, and has consequently been a topic of discussion. X360 featured it in their selection of "notorious videogame crimes". The "Man-Eater" finisher from MKII was compared by authors to the vagina dentata folktale tradition. Sociologist Dina Khapaeva wrote that gamers "are actually encouraged to act as cannibals" through actions such as performing Mileena's finishers. Kate Robertson of the University of Sydney likened cannibalistic female popular-media characters such as Mileena to the Sirens of Greek mythology in that "the connection between women and cannibalism reflects the common trope of the danger inherent within the female body" regarding "allure, fear and revulsion provoked by such a display of female power."

Mileena has been analyzed as a character affected by racial stereotyping in the Mortal Kombat games. She was among the series characters noted by activist Guy Aoki as allegedly perpetuating existing stereotypes of Asians as martial arts experts. Author Christopher B. Patterson cited her as an example of female Asian characters in Western games being "synonymous with eye candy". In their book Interacting With Video (1996), which condemned the violence of video games as supposedly affecting social behavior and causing real-life violence, Patricia Marks Greenfield and Rodney R. Cocking used the "two Asian twin sisters, Mileena and Kitana" as an example of a "highly eroticized Dragon Lady" trope. The authors believed that the games' increased diversity due to including "characters of color" such as the two and Jax did not necessarily represent increased progressive identity politics, but rather "the racist and sexist potential of individual fights." However, author David Church included Mileena in his praise of Mortal Kombat's "female or nonwhite" upper-tier playable characters while observing "the sheer diversity of playable characters undercutting the potential for racial and gender stereotyping". (Note: Kitana, Jax, Kung Lao, and Liu Kang were also included by the author in this category.)

Mileena drew attention from journalists for her Mortal Kombat 11 ending that showed her in a relationship with Tanya, which was continued in Mortal Kombat 1. Game Rant's Lauren Beeler-Baistad lauded the game for "succeed[ing] at LGBT representation because there isn't any stigma surrounding Mileena and Tanya both being women." Conversely, Ariel Litwak of The Michigan Daily felt that Mileena fell into the "'horny bisexual' stereotype" of female characters' attraction toward other women being an act of fan service and not true bisexuality. Renaldo Matadeen of Comic Book Resources praised their relationship but criticized the games' "past failures" at inclusivity such as the "mishandled queer narrative" of Kung Jin, an LGBT character introduced in Mortal Kombat X who has made no other playable series appearances. Lindsay Cooper of Capilano University described in-game lesbian relationships such as Mileena and Tanya as implicitly depicted in contrast to explicit stereotyping of male homosexuality, citing Streets of Rage 3 character Ash as an example. History professor Leonardo Dallacqua de Carvalho observed that MK1's rebooted storyline included "identity issues" like Mileena's relationship and the "empathetic" subplot of her and Baraka living with the Tarkat disease, which he likened to leprosy.

== See also ==
- Cannibalism in popular culture
