= Mortal Kombat: Armageddon =

2006 video game

- North American cover art
- Developer: Midway (Note: Wii version developed by Just Games Interactive)
- Publisher: Midway Home Entertainment (Note: Later releases of Wii version published by Warner Bros. Games)
- Director: Ed Boon
- Producer: John Podlasek
- Designers: Jim Terdina; Jay Biondo; Nick Shin
- Programmers: Michael Boon; Alan Villani; Joshua Chapman; Paul Hyman
- Artists: Steve Beran; Tony Goskie; Carlos Pesina
- Writer: John Vogel
- Composers: Chase Ashbaker; Rich Carle; Brian Chard
- Series: Mortal Kombat
- Engine: RenderWare
- Platforms: PlayStation 2, Xbox, Wii
- Release: PlayStation 2: NA: October 9, 2006; AU: October 26, 2006; EU: October 27, 2006; Xbox: NA: October 16, 2006; Wii: NA: May 29, 2007; AU: June 14, 2007; EU: June 15, 2007
- Genre: Fighting
- Modes: Single-player, multiplayer

Mortal Kombat: Armageddon is a 2006 fighting game developed and published by Midway for the PlayStation 2 and Xbox, with a later port for the Wii developed by Just Games Interactive (later releases were published by Warner Bros. Games after Midway's bankruptcy). It is the seventh main installment in the Mortal Kombat franchise, and a sequel to 2004's Mortal Kombat: Deception. Chronologically the final chapter in the original Mortal Kombat storyline, it features virtually every character from the previous games. Players select one of them and battle a selection of the other fighters. The story follows a warrior named Taven, who, after being awakened, goes on a journey to defeat his evil brother, leading up to the Armageddon war to determine the fate of the Mortal Kombat universe.

The gameplay retains many of the same elements from the previous Mortal Kombat titles Deadly Alliance and Deception, including characters' multiple fighting styles. Instead of the pre-scripted Fatalities of the previous games, players can now create their Fatality from a series of gory attacks. They can also design a custom character using the "Kreate a Fighter" mode. The game also includes the story-based Konquest mode from Deception, now casting the player as the warrior Taven, who must defeat his evil brother Daegon. Succeeding its predecessor's "Puzzle Kombat" mini game is "Motor Kombat", a cartoonish driving game influenced by Mario Kart.

The game was well-received, particularly for the many playable characters and the Konquest mode. However, reviewers criticized the use of the same engine from the previous two games and the similar play styles between characters; reaction to the game's custom Fatality feature was also mixed. Armageddon is the final Mortal Kombat game for sixth-generation consoles and the first for seventh-generation consoles with its release for the Wii. The next game in the series, the crossover Mortal Kombat vs. DC Universe, was released exclusively on seventh-generation consoles. The main storyline of the series was later revisited in the 2011 Mortal Kombat reboot, the first production from the newly-formed NetherRealm Studios.

== Gameplay ==
=== Fighting system ===
Screenshot of the Xbox version, showing a fight between the zombie Liu Kang and Jade

Each character possesses two fighting styles (instead of the three previously available in Deadly Alliance and Deception), one hand-to-hand and one weapon. Some of the larger bosses, like Onaga, have only one fighting style available. Other characters, such as Smoke and Mokap, do not have a weapon style, but a second unarmed style. Armageddon also introduces two new combat systems: the Air Kombat combo system, which is similar to Marvel vs. Capcom series' Air Combo and was also first shown in Mortal Kombat: Shaolin Monks action spin-off game; and a Killer Instinct series' combo breaker-styled Parry system.

Also new to the series is the ability to create a Fatality. These custom fatalities are a constant series of commands that players input until the Fatality ends. This method of performing Fatalities replaces the character-specific Fatalities of previous Mortal Kombat games, where gamers would simply enter one input and view the Fatality cinematically. As the player adds each input, less time is allowed for further inputs, and some moves cannot be repeated. 11 levels can be achieved with Kreate a Fatality, the lowest being a basic Fatality and the highest an "Ultimate Fatality". The greater the number of inputs for the Fatality, the more koins (the in-game currency) are given to the player.

=== Konquest ===
The Konquest mode in Armageddon kombines the same mode seen in Deception with elements borrowed from the spin-off adventure title Mortal Kombat: Shaolin Monks. The storyline centers on Taven and Daegon, two brothers who were put in suspended animation because their mother Delia (a sorceress) and their father Argus (the Edenian protector god) foresaw a cataclysmic event brought about by the Mortal Kombat fighters. Their awakening leads to the Konquest mode, which leads to the game's standard play.

Taven is the main hero that the player controls in Konquest. At the same time, Daegon, his brother, is the primary antagonist, plotting with villains such as Shinnok and the Red Dragon Clan to destroy both his brother and the Evil Blaze to attain full godhood for himself. Certain weapons are sometimes available in Konquest mode, which handle very much like those found in Shaolin Monks. Various relics can be collected, one for each Kombatant (except Taven, Chameleon, the two fighters that the player can create in the PS2 version, and additionally Khameleon in the Wii version), throughout this mode. Konquest unlocks characters' alternate costumes and other rewards in the rest of the game, while completing the Konquest entirely will unlock Taven for arcade play. Meat, Daegon, and Blaze can be unlocked by collecting enough relics.

=== Kreate-a-Fighter ===
A sample custom character from early screenshots

In addition to the choice of over 60 characters, Armageddon allows players to create, design, and use new fighters in the game. From the number of options, there are potentially thousands of different kombinations available. During production, the game offered 14 different character classes, which include Humans, Tarkatans, Mercenaries, Black Dragon Members, Ninjas, Retro Ninjas, etc. However, after the game's release, only one preset was available to the two genders, Sorcerer to Male, and Tarkatan to Female. Although the clothing of each class is still available, it must be individually unlocked and cannot be preset. All these presets can be unlocked by unlocking each piece of clothing that makes up that class. The preset will then appear under the preset menu.

Players can give their character a unique fighting style by changing their stance/win pose animation and assigning different (already named) attacks to the buttons on their controller. There is a range of swords and axes (the only weapons available) and special moves. Most moves and costume items need to be purchased with Koins earned in the game's other modes, though some moves and items are free from the beginning. The fighters can also be given their storyline. If a player uses their creation to finish a single-player game, they will see the ending that the player designed for them. However, the ending will cut off after roughly twelve lines or if the last line consists of one word. They can also be used in multiplayer games and online, using the PS2's online capability or Xbox Live. In line with other online-enabled games on the Xbox, multiplayer on Xbox Live was available to players until April 15, 2010. Mortal Kombat Armageddon is now playable online again on the replacement Xbox Live servers called Insignia. The game's ending is the exact text the player inputs as the fighter's biography.

=== Motor Kombat ===
The minigame in Mortal Kombat: Armageddon is named "Motor Kombat". True to the name, Ed Boon compared it to Mario Kart in the September 2006 issue of Official Xbox Magazine. Each character has a customized go-kart and their own special moves. The Motor Kombat characters keep their cartoonish "super deformed" style that was introduced in Deception's "Puzzle Kombat" mode. It also includes style-based fatalities for characters and death traps. The cars are based on the characters' looks and personalities; for instance, Baraka's car has blades on the front bumper as a fire-breathing skull powers an homage to Baraka's forearm blades, and Scorpion's car is an homage to his "Toasty" Fatality.

Motor Kombat features online play and offline support for up to four players (two players in the PS2 version) with a split-screen display. Players can knock their opponents into various deathtraps on the courses, like rolling pins, stones, crushers, slippery snow caves filled with stalagmites, and endless pits. The character roster for Motor Kombat is Scorpion, Sub-Zero, Bo' Rai Cho, Jax, Baraka, Raiden, Kitana, Mileena, Cyrax, and Johnny Cage.

== Plot ==
In Edenia, the sorceress Delia has a vision of the future where the forces of good and evil will engage in a final battle of Mortal Kombat that threatens to end all realms. To spare the Realms, Delia's husband Argus (an Elder God) constructs a pyramid where the battle will take place and has his sons, Taven and Daegon, put into dormant states in caverns. Delia instructs her Elemental, Blaze, to signal their dragons to awaken them before the final battle commences.

In the future, Taven is awakened by his dragon Orin in Earthrealm and is told that he and Daegon will be competing against each other in their quest. Wishing to speak with his father, Taven teleports to his father's temple and fights several members of the Black Dragon as well as mysterious warriors in red, only to find it deserted. He eventually finds a message left to him and Daegon by Argus stating that they will compete to take his place as an Elder God by defeating Blaze and that he has left weapons for each of them. When Taven finds that both weapons are missing, he is suddenly stunned unconscious by Sektor. Despite being imprisoned on a Tekunin warship, Taven frees himself and defeats Sektor before escaping to Orin's portal.

Taven then travels to his mother's temple in the mountains, where she has left armor for Daegon and himself. Upon reaching the Temple, Taven finds that it has been occupied by the Lin-Kuei and is forced to fight through their assassins, including Frost and their Grand Master Sub-Zero. Upon defeating the latter, Taven retrieves his armor and is soon attacked by Dark Lin-Kuei. Alongside Sub-Zero, Taven defeats the attackers after fighting both Smoke and Noob Saibot. With Taven's assistance, Sub-Zero reveals the identity of the mysterious warriors attacking him as the Red Dragon and that they are based out of Charred Mountain.

Upon traveling through the portal, Taven is forced to fight Fujin when the latter warns him to return to Edenia. Taven reluctantly defeats the wind god and proceeds to the Red Dragon stronghold, and finds Daegon, who is now much older. Despite being reunited, Daegon reveals himself as the leader of the Red Dragon and his intention to kill Taven so that he can defeat Blaze first. Taven then fights several enemies and eventually finds Daegon's dragon Caro, who had been imprisoned and experimented on. Upon being freed, Caro reveals that he had accidentally awoken Daegon earlier than planned, resulting in Daegon seeking out and murdering Argus and Delia upon learning the true nature of the competition. Hoping to atone for his mistake, Caro informs Taven that Daegon has gone to the Netherrealm and stays behind to destroy the Red Dragon stronghold.

Arriving in the Netherrealm, Taven repels Drahmin's ambush before noticing Shinnok being attacked by Li Mei. Believing that he is still an Elder God, Taven comes to Shinnok's defense and is later tasked to help reclaim his Spire in exchange for answers to Daegon's whereabouts. After Taven defeats Havik, Sheeva, and Kintaro, Shinnok reclaims his throne and informs Taven that Daegon has returned to Earthrealm, transporting him there. However, Shinnok is assisting Daegon and has informed other warriors of the contest's prize to eliminate all the competitors.

Upon returning to Orin's cave, Taven finds him mortally wounded from an attack by Quan Chi. On the verge of death, Orin keeps Quan Chi's portal open to prevent Taven from remaining trapped in the cave with him. Vowing revenge, Taven goes through the portal and arrives at Shao Khan's palace in Outworld. After reaching the palace dungeons, Taven defeats Mileena and comes across a captive Shujinko, who informs him of a meeting in Shao Kahn's throne room. After fighting through Goro and Reiko, Taven reaches the meeting between Quan Chi, Shang Tsung, Onaga, and Shao Khan, where they agree to an alliance to take possession of the contest's prize before transporting themselves to Argus's pyramid. Before he can follow, however, Taven is confronted by Raiden, who reveals he has made a deal with Shao Khan to assist him in exchange for Earthrealm's independence. Shocked at Raiden's betrayal, Taven defeats him before taking Quan Chi's portal to Edenia.

Once through the portal, Taven fights and defeats Scorpion before being confronted by Daegon. Before they can fight, however, they are interrupted by The Evil Blaze, who informs them that the competition has been corrupted and that they're fighting in the wrong place. Transported to the crater's edge, Taven and Daegon engage in a final battle where it is revealed that Daegon had stolen Taven’s sword in addition to his own. Although Taven ultimately kills Daegon, he becomes disillusioned with the quest and refuses to go further until Blaze reveals the true nature of the quest.

With all the fighters engaged in Mortal Kombat in the crater, Blaze reveals that it will be the epicenter of the apocalypse unless the quest is fulfilled. With their respective armors being the catalysts for ending Armageddon, only Taven and Daegon are meant to defeat Blaze, with one of two outcomes occurring depending on which brother completes the quest first, and will either destroy all the warriors or strip them of powers and abilities.

Reclaiming his sword from his fallen brother, Taven travels through a portal and fights to the top of the pyramid to confront Blaze. Taven manages to defeat Blaze and becomes an Elder God. However, neither outcome occurs, and the fighters' power increases. Taven vows to use his status as Elder God to find another solution to prevent Armageddon.

- This ending was deemed non-canon with the release of Mortal Kombat (2011) where it is revealed that Taven was killed before he could complete the quest. In the end Shao Kahn defeats Blaze, granting him godlike powers. Raiden, the only other Armageddon survivor, is brutally beaten by Shao Kahn for information on the Elder Gods' location. But before Shao Kahn can land the killing blow, Raiden sends the message "He must win" to stop Shao Kahn and prevent Armageddon from taking place.

== Characters ==
The PS2 and Xbox versions of Armageddon contain 62 fighters (as well as two extra slots for user-created characters), the most of any Mortal Kombat or tournament fighter game to date. Only two characters, Daegon and Taven, are new to the series. In contrast, Sareena makes her playable debut on non-portable consoles, and Meat makes his debut as a legitimate character. The Wii version contains all the original characters from both the original versions, as well as exclusive character Khameleon from the Nintendo 64 port of Mortal Kombat Trilogy, increasing the roster to 63.

Playable characters in bold are returning characters with new designs or characters entirely new to the series. The rest of the roster's character models are recycled from Deadly Alliance, Deception, and Shaolin Monks.

- Ashrah
- Baraka
- **Blaze**
- Bo' Rai Cho
- **Chameleon**
- Cyrax
- **Daegon**
- Dairou
- Darrius
- Drahmin
- Ermac
- Frost
- **Fujin**
- Goro
- Havik
- Hotaru
- Hsu Hao
- Jade
- **Jarek**
- Jax
- Johnny Cage
- Kabal
- **Kai**
- Kano
- Kenshi
- **Khameleon**
- **Kintaro**
- Kira
- Kitana
- Kobra
- Kung Lao
- Li Mei
- Liu Kang
- Mavado
- **Meat**
- Mileena
- Mokap
- Moloch
- **Motaro**
- Nightwolf
- Nitara
- **Noob Saibot**
- Onaga
- Quan Chi
- Raiden
- **Rain**
- **Reiko**
- Reptile
- **Sareena**
- Scorpion
- **Sektor**
- Shang Tsung
- Shao Kahn
- **Sheeva**
- **Shinnok**
- Shujinko
- Sindel
- **Smoke**
- Sonya Blade
- **Stryker**
- Sub-Zero
- Tanya
- **Taven**

== Development ==
Armageddon contains every playable fighter from the franchise's six main fighting game installments and upgraded versions, not counting the adventure games like Special Forces and Shaolin Monks. Khameleon, a secret character from the N64 version of Mortal Kombat Trilogy was absent from the PS2 and Xbox versions of Armageddon, but was added to the character roster of the Wii version due to fan demand.

The "Krypt" feature in the game's story mode included an unused concept video of Ermac's MK: Deception biography, which was intended to be the first of many animated bios, but no others were created. Only 17 characters in Armageddon received official still-image biographies.

== Release ==
The PlayStation 2 version was released in stores on October 9, 2006, while the Xbox version was released on October 16, with a Wii version released in North America on May 29, 2007. The Xbox version was not released in PAL territories. It was later released as part of the Mortal Kombat Kollection on September 29, 2008, for the PlayStation 2.

A "Premium" edition was released in North America for the PlayStation 2, featuring the following content in a steelbook case: a 60-minute bonus DVD with a History of Fatalities documentary and new videos for more than 50 characters, an animation cel of the cover art autographed by creator Ed Boon, and an arcade-perfect version of UMK3 included on the main disc. There are four package design variations, some exclusive to certain stores featuring different character sets or the Mortal Kombat dragon emblem.

The Wii version of Armageddon has a new motion-based control system and is compatible with the Wii's Classic Controller and GameCube controller. It also has a new Endurance Mode, a Wii Remote Training Mode, new menu screens, and Khameleon as a playable character. However, this version does not have online features.

== Reception ==
Reception

Aggregate score
Aggregator	Score
GameRankings	Xbox: 78% PS2: 76% Wii: 72%

Review scores
Publication	Score
Eurogamer	5/10
Game Informer	8.25/10 (PS2, Xbox); 7.5 (Wii)
GameSpot	7.0/10 (PS2, Xbox); 7.5/10 (Wii)
GameTrailers	8.6/10, 7.6 (Wii)
IGN	8.5/10 (PS2, Xbox); 7.8/10 (Wii)

Reception for Mortal Kombat: Armageddon has been generally favorable. The game was often praised for including a complete character roster; IGN stated that "the inclusion of 62 total warriors is a massive achievement," while Game Informer said that "nothing really comes close to what Midway has thrown together here." GameSpot praised the Konquest mode, "which was such a low point of MK: Deception, as one of the relative strengths of MK: Armageddon."

Reception to the Kreate-A-Fatality feature was mixed. While GameSpot called it "a disappointing replacement to the classics," IGN noted that not having set fatalities added variety to gameplay. The reception to the Kreate-A-Fighter mode was also mixed, where some noted limitations, yet with others like GameSpy saying they "haven't seen a character creation tool this robust since City of Heroes."

The game's engine was criticized for being built entirely upon that of the previous 3D Mortal Kombat titles. PSM went as far as saying the system was not innovative. While many of the gameplay flaws in Mortal Kombat: Deception have been fixed (lack of a wake-up game that allows 50/50 attacks upon knocking down an opponent, and the slow jumping system, which prevents players from jumping over most projectiles, infinite combos), new glitches arise with the new Air Kombat and Parry systems. Eurogamer noted that despite the large choice of characters, "much of this number is made up by the huge number of clone characters" and that "so many characters look and play alike."

The game won the award for Best Fighting Game at the Spike Video Game Awards in 2006. IGN named it the Best PS2 Fighting Game. Official Xbox Magazine put Armageddon as the "Xbox Game of the Year" in a 2006 issue. Gaming Target put the game in its "52 Games We'll Still Be Playing From 2006" selection. The Academy of Interactive Arts & Sciences nominated Armageddon for "Fighting Game of the Year" at the 10th Annual Interactive Achievement Awards.
