= Sonya Blade =

Mortal Kombat character

- Mortal Kombat character
- Sonya Blade artwork by John Tobias for Mortal Kombat 3 (1995)
- First appearance: Mortal Kombat (1992)
- Created by: Ed Boon; John Tobias
- Designed by: Various: John Tobias (MK, MK3, MK4); Luis Mangubat (MK:D); Mark Lappin (MK:SM); Cy Mandua (MKvs.DCU); Atomhawk Design (MK9)
- Voiced by: Various: Peg Burr (MK, MK3, MK4) Beth Melewski (MK:SM) Chrissie Rios (MK:DA, MK:A) Dana Lyn Baron (MKvs.DCU, MK9) S.G. Willie (MKvs.DCU) Tricia Helfer (MKX) Ronda Rousey (MK11) Kathleen Plus Andrade (MKX, MK11, MK1 fight efforts) Bridgette Wilson (MK11 skin) Vanessa Marshall (MK:O) Jennifer Carpenter (MK Legends)
- Portrayed by: Various: Bridgette Wilson (1995 film) Sandra Hess (Annihilation) Jeri Ryan (Rebirth, web series) Jessica McNamee (2020s films)
- Motion capture: Various: Elizabeth Malecki (MK) Kerri Hoskins (MK3, MK4) Lorrisa Julianus (MKvs.DCU MK9, MKX)

In-universe information
- Species: Human
- Weapon: Wind blade (MK4); Kali sticks (MK:DA, MK:A)
- Origin: United States
- Nationality: American

Sonya Blade is a character in the Mortal Kombat fighting game franchise by Midway Games and NetherRealm Studios. She debuted in the original 1992 game as the roster's sole female fighter, a military officer with the Special Forces. In the storyline of the games, Sonya becomes involved with the eponymous Mortal Kombat tournament through the pursuit of her archenemy, the criminal leader Kano. She subsequently joins the warriors defending Earthrealm and establishes a government agency dedicated to battling otherworldly threats. The series' rebooted timeline also depicts her as the love interest to martial arts actor Johnny Cage and the mother of their daughter Cassie.

A mainstay of the franchise, Sonya has also appeared in various media outside of the games. Reception of the character has been generally positive, regarding her role as one of Mortal Kombat's primary female fighters. However, some of her outfits in the games have received criticism.

== Conception and creation ==
The original 1992 Mortal Kombat game initially featured six playable characters. According to series co-creator and programmer Ed Boon, a seventh was added by developers Midway Games after the president of Williams granted them an additional six weeks to "polish the game" following successful testing. The new character was named "Stryker" until the developers decided they needed a female character, which resulted in Sonya being added and given Stryker's storyline of a Special Forces agent pursuing Kano. Sonya was named after one of Boon's sisters, and was inspired by martial artist and actress Cynthia Rothrock. Rothrock later claimed that, following Midway's unsuccessful attempt to hire her to play Sonya in the original game, the company added her likeness and moves to the game without her consent. In a 1995 interview, series co-creator John Tobias compared Sonya to Street Fighter character Chun-Li in including her in the game, opining that regardless of character gender, "if you make them cool, people will play them."

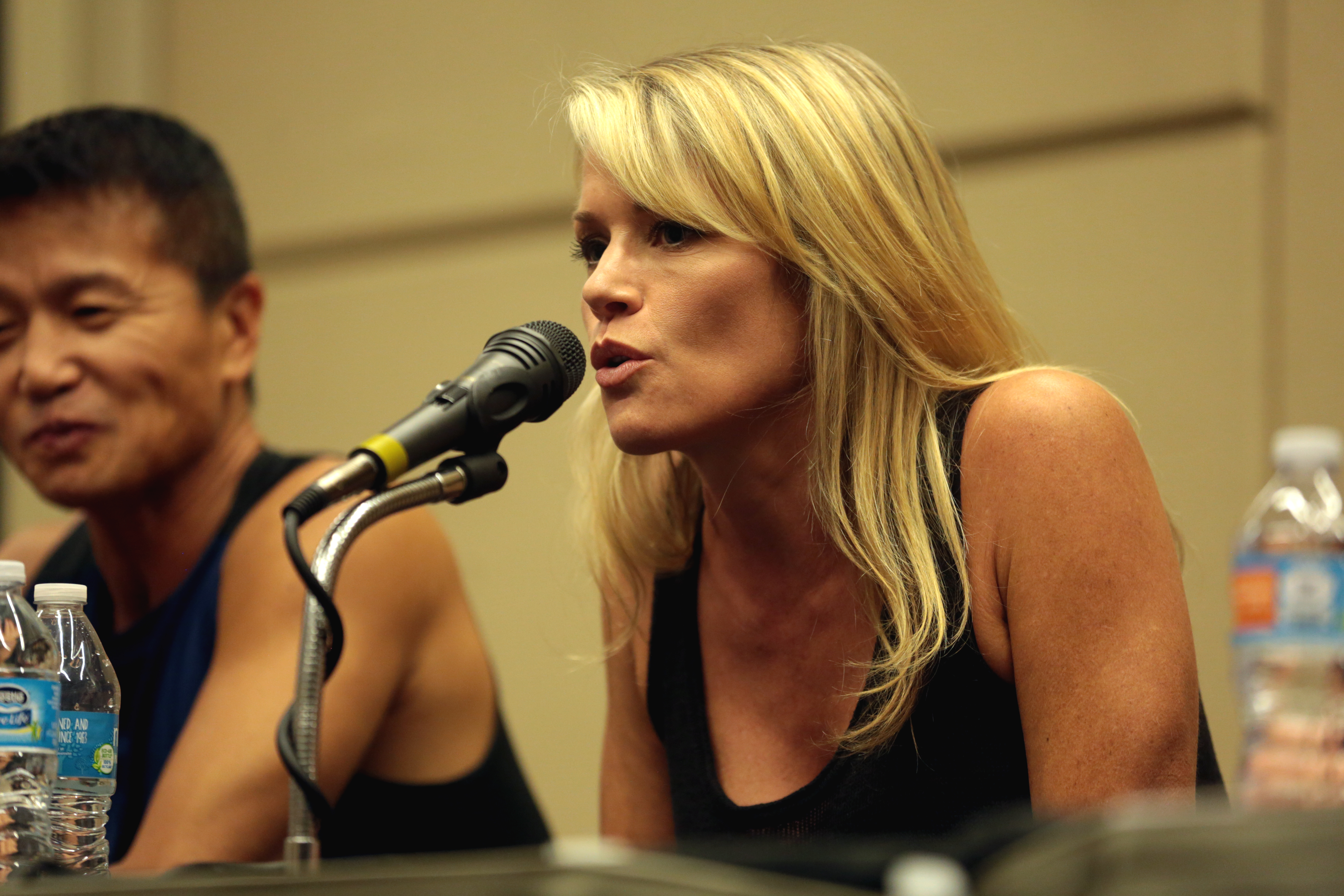
Actress Kerri Hoskins during the Mortal Kombat cast reunion at the 2017 Game On Expo. Hoskins has portrayed Sonya in various series games and related media.

According to Tobias, Sonya and Kano were chosen the least by players of the first game and were thus omitted from the 1993 sequel Mortal Kombat II, but were added as unplayable background characters as Tobias still wanted them in the game. Two female ninja characters, Kitana and Mileena, were added in her stead. Sonya and Kano returned as playable characters for Mortal Kombat 3 (1995). Tobias explained that Midway's objective was to make the game's characters equal in terms of playability, and believed that male players "aren't so macho that they're afraid to pick Sonya, because they know they can stay in the game with her and they can't with somebody else." The action-adventure spin-off game Mortal Kombat: Special Forces (2000) was to have Sonya as a selectable character along with Jax, but she was dropped due to deadline issues exacerbated by Tobias's sudden departure from Midway in 1999 due to his dissatisfaction with the game's production.

NetherRealm Studios (formerly Midway Games) art director Steve Beran said of Sonya in the 2011 Mortal Kombat reboot game, "When you look at the version of Sonya or Scorpion from the first Mortal Kombat, it's almost laughable how simple their costumes were. You have to give fans the recognizability of their favorite characters, but make it not look like Sonya's wearing a leotard and workout clothes". Tobias said in 2012 that he created "characters like Liu Kang or Shang Tsung, who represented the more mystical sides of the story" of the original series, "and Johnny Cage, Sonya or Jax, who came from places grounded more in reality...[Sonya and Kitana] were both important pieces of the game's fiction and archetypal structure of characters. But, player demographic was primarily a hardcore male audience and so the look and design of our female characters pandered to them back then just as they do today."

=== Live-action and voice portrayals ===
Sonya was played by fitness instructor Elizabeth Malecki in the first game, but she and several other actors from the digitized Mortal Kombat games later filed an unsuccessful lawsuit against Midway over unpaid royalties from the home versions of the game and the unauthorized use of their likenesses. She was consequently replaced by Kerri Hoskins for Mortal Kombat 3. Hoskins, whose martial arts training consisted of "some Tang Soo Do and a past of WWF wrestling and gymnastics", had previously appeared in the Midway releases NBA Jam and Revolution X. She additionally played Sonya in the 1995-96 theatrical show Mortal Kombat: Live Tour, for which she underwent additional martial arts and gymnastics training. She explained in a 2010 interview that the show worked to emphasize getting young audiences into the martial arts, while she and the show's other actors would give motivational speeches to schoolchildren.

Motion capture for the character was provided by Hoskins in Mortal Kombat 3 and Mortal Kombat 4, and by Midway graphics artist Carlos Pesina for the three-dimensional games Mortal Kombat: Deception and Mortal Kombat: Armageddon. She was played by actress Lorrisa Julianus in Mortal Kombat vs. DC Universe, the 2011 Mortal Kombat reboot, and Mortal Kombat X. Kara Davidson played the character in Mortal Kombat 11.

Sonya was voiced by Peg Burr from the original Mortal Kombat to Mortal Kombat 4. She was voiced by Beth Melewski for the beat-'em-up spinoff game Mortal Kombat: Shaolin Monks, by Dana Lyn Baron in Mortal Kombat vs. DC Universe and the 2011 series reboot, and by Tricia Helfer in Mortal Kombat X. In Mortal Kombat 11, Sonya was voiced by mixed martial artist Ronda Rousey, and Bridgette Wilson, who played Sonya in the 1995 motion picture Mortal Kombat, provided her voice and likeness for a downloadable character skin inspired by the film.

== Appearances ==
=== Mortal Kombat games ===
Sonya Blade is one of the main heroes of the Mortal Kombat series. In the original Mortal Kombat (1992), she is the lieutenant of a Special Forces unit that is pursuing Kano, the leader of the Black Dragon crime syndicate. She trails him to a remote island where Shang Tsung's Mortal Kombat tournament is being held, but is captured and forced to compete. Sonya is not playable in Mortal Kombat II (1993), but is included in the storyline when her superior, Major Jax Briggs, searches for her in the otherworldly dimension of Outworld, where the next tournament is held. Sonya is one of thunder god and Earth protector Raiden's champions chosen to defend Earth against evil Outworld emperor Shao Kahn in Mortal Kombat 3 (1995). In Mortal Kombat 4 (1997), Sonya, along with Jax, again must aid Raiden and perennial Mortal Kombat champion Liu Kang in defending Earth, this time from the fallen former Elder God Shinnok, while warning the United States government of the impending Outworld invasion.

In Mortal Kombat: Deadly Alliance (2002), the Outerworld Investigation Agency, a government organization led by Sonya and Jax that investigates portals leading to other realms, has been destroyed, and she must rescue two agents stranded in Outworld. In Mortal Kombat: Deception (2004), she and the other Earth heroes are killed by the Dragon King Onaga and resurrected to serve as his slaves until their souls are freed by the spirit of Liu Kang and Shao Kahn's former enforcer Ermac. Sonya is playable along with the entire series roster in the compilation game Mortal Kombat: Armageddon (2006). She is one of the characters representing Mortal Kombat in the non-canonical crossover game Mortal Kombat vs. DC Universe (2008).

Raiden's attempt to prevent the titular Armageddon resets the timeline in the series reboot game Mortal Kombat (2011). Sonya and Jax are pursuing Kano until Jax is imprisoned by tournament host Shang Tsung, who forces her to compete in order to spare his life until Raiden intervenes on her behalf. She also unwillingly acquaints herself with Johnny Cage after rejecting his advances, but warms up to him after he saves her from an attempt on her life by Kano. After Jax's arms are obliterated by Ermac during the events of the second tournament in Outworld, Sonya transports him back to Earth for medical attention. She and Jax later regroup with the other heroes as they assemble to fight Shao Kahn's invasion of Earth until they are massacred by Kahn's brainwashed wife, Queen Sindel, leaving Sonya and Cage the lone survivors at the conclusion following Kahn's death and Raiden's accidental killing of Liu Kang.

In Mortal Kombat X (2015), set several years after the previous game, Sonya and Johnny marry and have a daughter, Cassie Cage, but they later divorce due to Sonya's focus on her career. Cassie grows up to join her mother's Special Forces unit, and is the catalyst in defeating Shinnok and saving Earth, after which she, Sonya, and Johnny reconcile. In Mortal Kombat 11 (2019), Sonya, Cassie, and Jax's daughter Jacqui lead a strike team into the underworld Netherrealm before its denizens can attack Earth, during which Sonya sacrifices herself to ensure the mission's success and her allies' escape. When the keeper of time Kronika causes temporal anomalies amidst her plot to reset time, younger versions of Sonya and Johnny are brought to the present. Sonya is outraged that she has a child with Johnny and that Cassie apparently abandons her during the mission. After erasing Kano's present self from existence, she begins to warm up to her version of Johnny and reconciles with Cassie.

Sonya is not selectable in Mortal Kombat 1 (2023), but appears as an assist-based "Kameo" fighter. A hybrid of Sonya and Kano from an alternate timeline appears in the final battle. Additionally, an alternate timeline Sonya appears in the fourth season of the "Invasions" mode opposite alternate timeline versions of Jax and Johnny Cage as the trio travel from one timeline to the next in order to wipe out an army of Mileena hybrids.

=== Other appearances ===
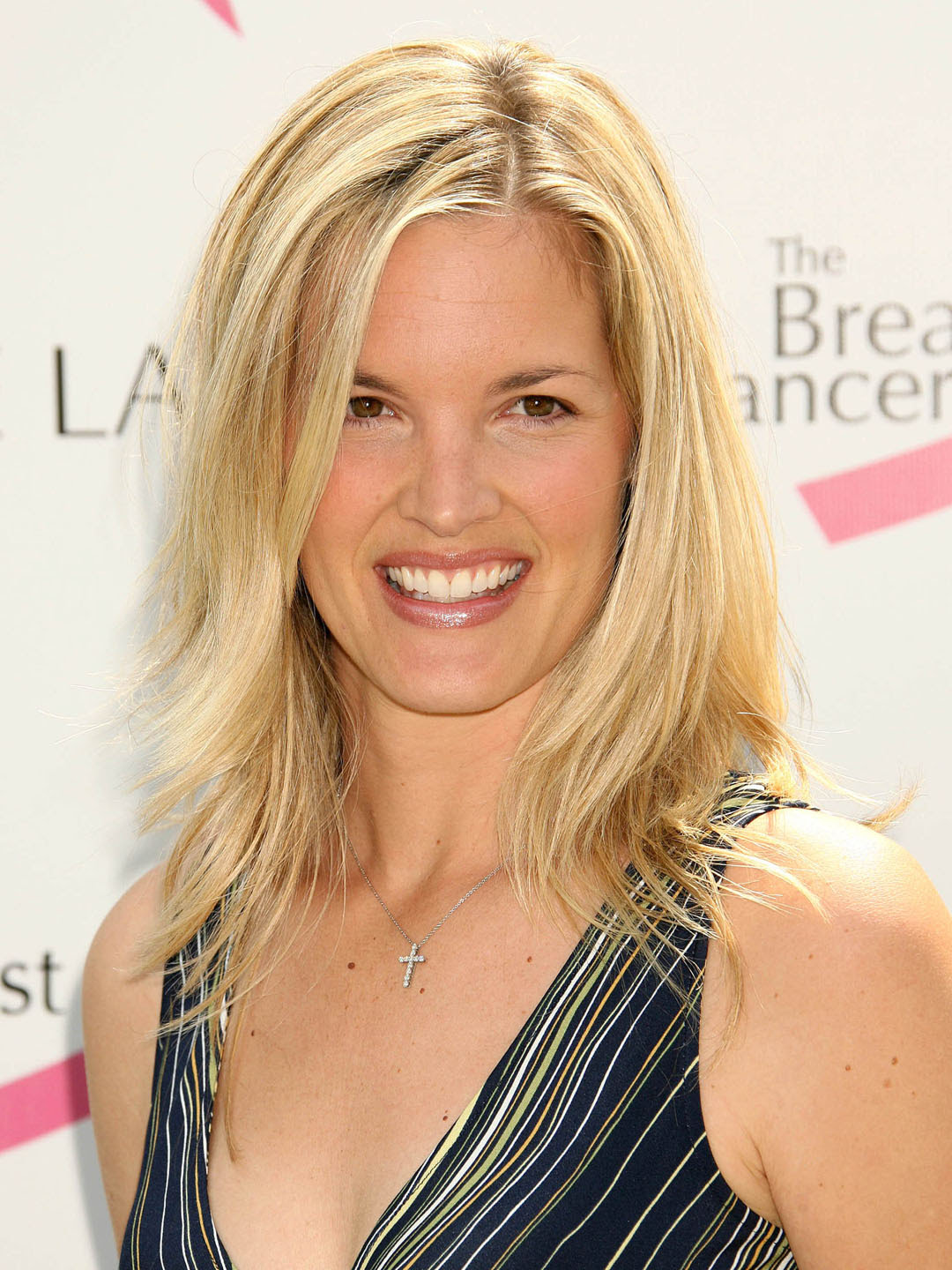
Bridgette Wilson played Sonya in Mortal Kombat (1995). The film's producer Lauri Apelian recalled she was satisfied in how she and Talisa Soto (Kitana) delivered female characters that "really were intelligent, strong women."

Sonya is one of the three main protagonists alongside Johnny Cage and Liu Kang in the feature film Mortal Kombat (1995). Her backstory from the original game of pursuing her archenemy Kano to Shang Tsung's island and being forced to compete in the tournament is intact, and she fights and kills Kano in the competition. Bridgette Wilson was cast as Sonya after the filmmakers' original choice, Cameron Diaz, injured her wrist during martial arts training and dropped out. Wilson performed her own stuntwork and was given the nickname "RoboBabe" by director Paul Anderson. As she was a late addition to the production, her fight scene with Kano was the final one shot in order to give her adequate time to train. In Mortal Kombat: The Journey Begins, an animated prequel released four months prior to the film, Sonya (voiced by Jennifer Hale) is again one of the three main protagonists, to whom Raiden explains the history of the Mortal Kombat tournament. Wilson was replaced by Sandra Hess for the 1997 sequel Mortal Kombat Annihilation. Sonya is devastated by the death of Johnny Cage, who is killed by evil Outworld emperor Shao Kahn at the film's start after he saves her life. She rescues her partner Jax and they join her fellow Earth heroes in stopping Kahn's destruction of Earth. Hoskins had auditioned for the role but did not "make the last cut of three girls" due to having no acting experience.

Australian actress Jessica McNamee played Sonya in the 2021 reboot film Mortal Kombat. She is depicted as a veteran who has spent years researching the Mortal Kombat tournament while having captured the mercenary Kano (Josh Lawson). McNamee, who submitted multiple audition tapes in campaigning for the role, described the character as "the voice of reason" with a degree of "playfulness and lightness". McNamee reprises the role for the 2026 sequel Mortal Kombat II.

Sonya is a main character in the animated series Mortal Kombat: Defenders of the Realm (1996) and was voiced by Olivia d'Abo. She is a supporting character in the animated Mortal Kombat Legends films Scorpion's Revenge (2020) and Battle of the Realms (2021), voiced by Jennifer Carpenter.

Jeri Ryan played Sonya in the short film Mortal Kombat: Rebirth (2010). In the film's grittier contemporary setting, she is a lieutenant in the fictional Deacon City Police Department. In the first two episodes of the follow-up web series Mortal Kombat: Legacy (2011), Sonya works with Jax to bust the Black Dragon but her obsession with hunting down Kano leads to her capture, forcing Jax to launch a rescue mission that ends with Kano escaping and Jax seriously injured.

Sonya appeared alongside the other characters from the first two Mortal Kombat games in Malibu Comics' licensed 1994-95 comic series. Her family dynamic with Johnny Cage and their daughter Cassie Cage is featured in DC Comics' 2015 Mortal Kombat X comic series set before the events of the game. She appears in the novelizations of the first Mortal Kombat film and Mortal Kombat Annihilation. In Jeff Rovin's non-canon novel Mortal Kombat (1995), set prior to the tournament of the original game, Sonya works undercover as a Black Dragon operative in her attempt to apprehend Kano.

Malecki appeared in costume as Sonya in a 1992 feature on the original Mortal Kombat on the British television program GamesMaster. Hoskins dressed up as the character to film a workout video for Threshold Entertainment's 1995 CD-ROM The Ultimate Guide to Mortal Kombat, and to promote Mortal Kombat 4 at the 1997 Electronic Entertainment Expo. Ronda Rousey, who voiced Sonya in Mortal Kombat 11, wore a themed ring outfit for a match against Ruby Riot at the 2019 WWE Elimination Chamber as a promotion for the game. The character has been licensed for action figures, and limited-edition statuettes by Syco Collectibles.

== Reception ==
Critical reaction to Sonya Blade has been positive, with commentators noting the character's sex appeal and toughness. In 2016, Game Revolution included her among ten best female characters in video games, stating she had "stood the test of time." Hyper also reported a minor "controversy over the character Sonya Blade in the first Mortal Kombat. Some men complained they didn't want to kill her, and not just because they were fond of her big breasts and long legs - they just didn't feel they could hit a girl." MSN included her among the 20 "hottest women in video game history", stating, "independent, tough, and willing to put herself on the line for her friends, Sonya Blade is the embodiment of the modern woman. Well, except for the part where she can sometimes rip your head off."

In 2014, GamesRadar called her "Mortal Kombat's leading lady". Jason Gallagher of Game Rant opined that "with all due respect to Kitana, Jade, and Mileena, [Sonya] is still the most recognizable female character in franchise history today. She's played a large role in various ongoing storylines, and is one-half of the reason Cassie Cage exists today. The Special Forces crew has expanded greatly over the last two decades, but it was Sonya that started it all."

Sonya's fight with Kano in the first Mortal Kombat film was rated as the 19th best cinematic fight scene by UGO in 2010. Ranking this scene as the best in this film, UGO also commented that "Sonya Blade has always been sort of an also-ran character in the Mortal Kombat franchise, taking second place to the busty ninja sisters Kitana and Mileena. But the movies gave her a chance to shine." In 2011, Complex ranked Wilson's role as Sonya at 12th place on the list of "hottest women in video game movies", but with likeness factor of only 29% (as compared to Sonya's later appearance in the video game Mortal Kombat vs. DC Universe). On the other hand, 1UP.com's Retronauts opined Wilson was miscast and not convincing in the role, and Leonard Pitts cited Sonya being captured and taken hostage in the first film as a prime example in his 1995 article alleging that "sexism still prevails in action movies."

Ash Kapriyelov, author of the document Representation of Women in Video Games, listed Sonya as an example of a "positive shift in representation of women," progressing from Mortal Kombat 9 to Mortal Kombat X, noting her MKX outfit as "very conservative and realistic," in contrast to her MK9 attire, which was more revealing. Author Maria Carolina Fontanella examined Sonya's designs throughout the series. Regarding her Deadly Alliance costume, Fontanella states "Adding a short coat is not very effective when the character in question wears a white blouse, very short and tight to the body, that highlights your breasts and even has the straps of your panties showing above of the pants." For her aforementioned MK9 costume, Fontanella examines "Your panties are no longer showing, but your pants are low, almost showing her pelvis. The short blouse was exchanged for a kind of vest, which does nothing to protect her and is also extremely low-cut." GamesRadar author Lucas Sullivan commented "Sonya is just as important to the plot of MK9 as her primarily male counterparts, playing the role of a Special Forces agent caught up in a tournament that will determine the fate of Earthrealm itself. But the problem is that her practical disposition doesn't match up with her wildly unrealistic rendering," while also criticizing her MK9 costume, describing it as "probably the [game's] biggest offender" among the game's revealing female outfits, especially in regards to the cleavage area.

On the other hand, similar to some of the other female characters in MK11, Sonya has received some backlash for her design in the game. Princess Weekes from The Mary Sue countered this with stating "The impulse of some to blame 'feminists' for ruining Sonya is really laughable because all it does is prove something that these same people want so desperately to disprove: They're just sexist and don't care about the actual characters," while arguing that she and other female characters still have "sexy" costumes in the game. Ronda Rousey's voicing of Sonya in MK11 received criticism. Vice writer Danielle Riendeau described her performance as "terrible," and expressed "Sonya Blade made me excited that I could play as a girl in a fighting game. And in her first incarnation, she wasn't a wildly sexualized adolescent fantasy."

== See also ==
- United States Army Special Forces in popular culture
