= Kerri Hoskins =

American actress and model (born 1970)

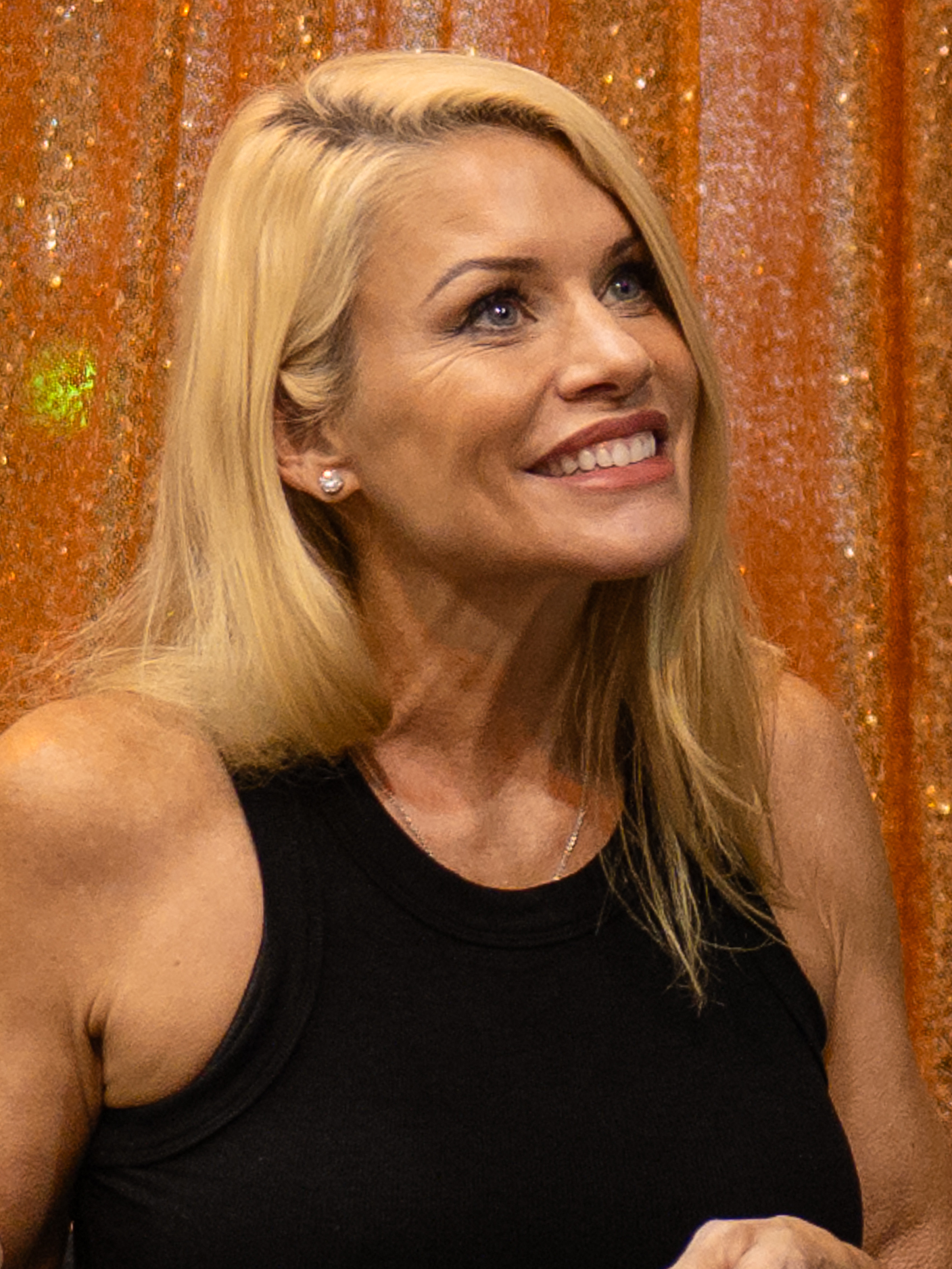
- Hoskins in 2023
- Born: Kerri Ann Hoskins; February 20, 1970 (age 56); Cambridge, Minnesota, U.S.
- Occupations: Actress, model, artist
- Years active: 1992–2023
- Children: 4
- Website: https://kerriann.gallery

Kerri Ann Hoskins Reavis (born February 20, 1970) is an American former glamour model and video game actress.

== Biography ==
Kerri Hoskins is best known for portraying Sonya Blade in several incarnations of the game beginning with Mortal Kombat 3, replacing Elizabeth Malecki. She toured the United States and Europe portraying Sonya Blade in the Mortal Kombat: Live Tour, appearing at venues like Radio City Music Hall. She also appeared in a number of other games produced by Midway Games including Revolution X and NBA Jam, and is a secret character in NBA Showtime: NBA on NBC. Hoskins trained for two years in Tang Soo Do, a Korean martial art; John Tobias noted her to be "actually very good" and "punching like a guy." She has also modeled for Playboy magazine.

According to a re-published newspaper article dated 2001, Kerri Hoskins was married to Scott Branson and her last name changed to Branson; as of that date, Branson lived in North Aurora, Illinois, where she raises two twin boys who suffer from severe cerebral palsy. She has four children: Leah, Sam, Luke and Zachary. She married Sean Reavis in 2017, and now lives in Batavia. In October 2012, Hoskins ran for a seat on the Kane County, Illinois board.

On October 18, 2022, Hoskins posted a video to Instagram revealing that her psychologist concluded that she may be on the autism spectrum. She stated that she will be undergoing further evaluation with a specialist before a formal diagnosis would be made.

== Video game roles ==
- NBA Jam – cheerleader (1993)
- Revolution X – Head Mistress Helga, freeable hostages (1994)
- Mortal Kombat 3 – Sonya Blade (1995)
- Ultimate Mortal Kombat 3 – Sonya Blade (1995)
- Mortal Kombat Trilogy – Sonya Blade (1996)
- War Gods – Vallah (1996)
- Mortal Kombat Mythologies: Sub-Zero – Kia (1997)
- Mortal Kombat 4 – Sonya Blade (1997)
- Mortal Kombat Gold – Sonya Blade (including voice) (1999)
- NBA Showtime: NBA on NBC – herself (1999)
- NBA Jam 2004 (2003)
- Mortal Kombat: Deception (2004) – herself and archive footage (“Sonya Trading Card” bonus movie)
- Killer Instinct – Maya (motion capture) (2013)
- Galactic Tank Force – Empress Annoya (2023)

== Appearances in Playboy Special Editions ==
- Playboy's Nudes December 1992.
- Playboy's Book of Lingerie Vol. 29 (January/February 1993) – cover with Jody Hoskins.
- Playboy's Girls of Summer '93 (June 1993) – p. 11, 50, 98.
- Playboy's Blondes, Brunettes & Redheads (August 1993).
- Playboy's Book of Lingerie Vol. 34 (November 1993).
- Playboy's Book of Lingerie Vol. 35 (January 1994).
- Playboy's Bathing Beauties (March 1994) – p. 34.
- Playboy's Book of Lingerie Vol. 36 (March 1994).
- Playboy's Book of Lingerie Vol. 39 (September 1994) – p. 32–33, 50–51.
- Playboy's Nudes November 1994.
- Playboy's Hot Denim Daze (May 1995) – p. 60.
- Playboy's Book of Lingerie Vol. 75 (September 2000).
