= Mortal Kombat: Special Forces =

2000 video game

- North American cover art, featuring Jax
- Developer: Midway
- Publisher: Midway
- Director: John Walsh
- Producer: Michael Gottlieb
- Programmers: John Walsh; Jonathan Murfey; Daniel Markham
- Artists: Richard Ho; Carlos Pesina; Herman Sanchez
- Composer: Dan Forden
- Series: Mortal Kombat
- Platform: PlayStation
- Release: NA: June 29, 2000; EU: September 29, 2000
- Genre: Action-adventure
- Mode: Single-player

Mortal Kombat: Special Forces is a 2000 action-adventure game developed and published by Midway for the PlayStation. A spin-off of the Mortal Kombat franchise, it is the second installment not to be a fighting game and the first 3D spin-off. Set before the original Mortal Kombat game in the series, it follows Jax as he pursues criminal leader Kano and his gang.

Special Forces endured a difficult development due to series co-creator John Tobias and other staff members leaving Midway before the game was completed. The departure of Tobias led to a significant trimming of content, including the removal of Sonya Blade as a playable character. Upon release, the game was panned by critics for its poor level design and tedious gameplay, and is considered one of the worst video games of all time. The game was re-released in 2025 as part of the Mortal Kombat: Legacy Kollection compilation.

== Gameplay ==
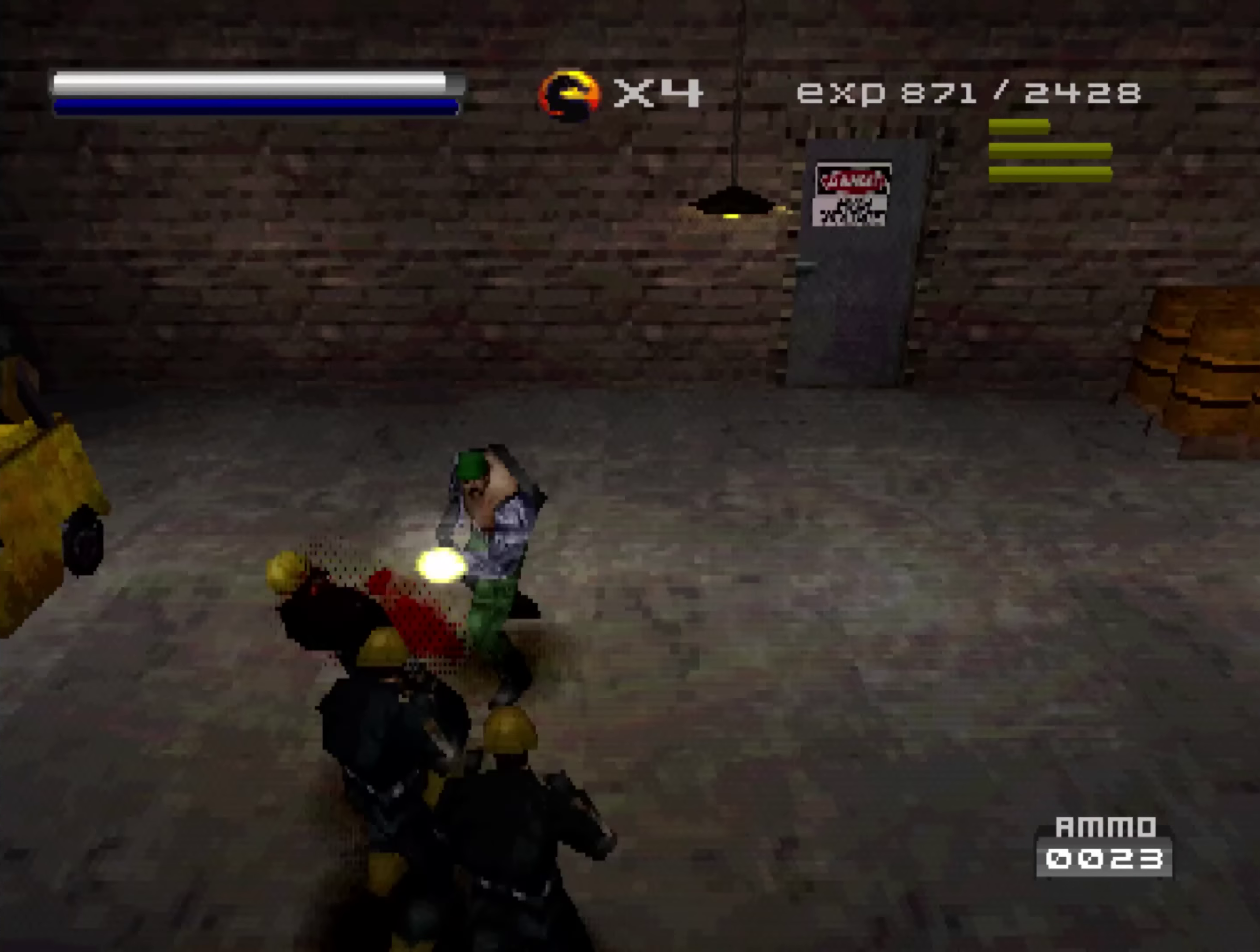
Gameplay screenshot

Mortal Kombat: Special Forces is a third-person view action-adventure game. The protagonist is Jax, who uses not only hand-to-hand combat techniques but also firearms and explosives. There are five levels set on Earth in Netherrealm, with a boss battle at the end of each of them. Exploring the locations in the search for keys, the players solve puzzles, find the codes to unlock the doors, and blast hidden passages in walls. Jax can ascend to higher-level platforms even as he cannot jump, but he can push large blocks.

The player can restore Jax's health meter using first aid kits. The player also has a limited energy reserve: whenever Jax performs one of his special techniques, he spends energy that can be replenished by performing certain combos. Jax can attack with his hands and feet, as well as block counter strikes. Although there are no Fatality systems, the combo system allows finishing off the opponent with the final blow in case the enemy's health line is exhausted by this moment. The experience points that a player gains by defeating enemies allow one to get new combos. An in-game menu displays the presence of items in the player's inventory, and also contains information on the purpose of the current mission. After completing the game, the player can activate the cheat menu to start a new game with additional bonuses.

== Plot ==
Mortal Kombat: Special Forces is chronologically the first game in the Mortal Kombat storyline, as its events take place 4 weeks before Mortal Kombat Mythologies: Sub-Zero. The story of the game involves Kano freeing his gang, the Black Dragon from a maximum security prison. US Army Major Jax Briggs, seeking revenge for the slaughter of his Special Forces comrades at the hands of the Black Dragon, undertakes a mission to stop them from retrieving an artifact of great power, the Eye of Chitian. The true power of the artifact is shown in the ending that it can open portals to other realms when Jax uses the artifact to teleport himself and Kano back to Earthrealm after defeating him.

== Characters ==
Besides Jax, Kano, and Kano's Black Dragon subordinates Tremor and Jarek, the game features three characters exclusive to this entry in the series:

- Gemini: Jax's base operative, relaying information and messages to him from headquarters. The two share a friendship, and Gemini worries excessively about Jax. Operating over radio only, she is never seen in-game.
- No Face: A member of the Black Dragon organization led by Kano, who freed him from a high-security prison. He is described as only having knowledge of explosive devices, he wears sticks of dynamites strapped to his chest and uses a flamethrower as a weapon. He has no nose, ears, hair, and a pale complexion, based on his name.
- Tasia: An expert swordswoman and deadly ninja master who is a member of Kano's Black Dragon organization. Like Tremor, No Face, and Jarek, Kano freed her from a high-security prison. She wields two ninjatō swords and has an ability to teleport. She appears along with Jarek to capture Cassie and Jacqui by the orders of Black Dragon in the Mortal Kombat X comic book.

== Development ==
This was the second Mortal Kombat game developed by Midway that was not a fighting game, after having tested the waters with Mortal Kombat Mythologies: Sub-Zero in 1997. Series co-creator John Tobias intended to work on a series of platform games to expand the Mortal Kombat universe, including titles centering on Baraka and Liu Kang; only the latter was actually released by Midway (2005's Mortal Kombat: Shaolin Monks) despite having sat on the drawing board for many years.

Although Special Forces was only released on the PlayStation, it was also supposed to be released both on the Nintendo 64 and Dreamcast. Many of the Midway Games staff, including Tobias, left the company in 1999 for various reasons while the game was still in production. The plot of Special Forces (which originally included Sonya Blade) was greatly revised following Tobias's departure and the game was rushed to completion.

The game ultimately launched at the discounted price of MSRP $19.99. Tobias said about the final version: "You know I really never played it, I saw it at E3 and I maybe played it for like five minutes and never really played it after that. So I'm not really familiar with how it ended up." Ed Boon later recalled: "I didn't work on Special Forces. The game and project were riddled with all kinds of problems. I could write a book on that."

== Reception ==
Reception

Aggregate score
Aggregator	Score
Metacritic	28/100

Review scores
Publication	Score
AllGame	1.5/5
CNET Gamecenter	4/10
Electronic Gaming Monthly	1.5/10
EP Daily	7/10
Game Informer	1.75/10
GamePro	2/5
GameSpot	2.1/10
IGN	3/10
Next Generation	1/5
Official U.S. PlayStation Magazine	1.5/5

The game received "unfavorable" reviews according to the review aggregation website Metacritic. Blake Fischer of NextGen said of the game, "Don't let the cheap price fool you. This isn't even worth a trip to the store."

Of all the Mortal Kombat games, Special Forces is considered by some to be the worst. Its sales were so low that Midway placed the series on hold in preparation for Mortal Kombat: Deadly Alliance (2002). Ed Boon himself stated: "The game had a pretty bumpy development ride and the game didn't turn out very good at all." In 2011, GamesRadar+ ranked it as the second most absurd Mortal Kombat offshoot (behind only Mortal Kombat: Live Tour). In 2013, the website also ranked it as the 41st worst game ever made.

Conversely, some of the reviews have been more positive. Video Games: The Ultimate Guide gave the game 7 out of 10, GameVortex gave it 79%, and The Electric Playground gave it 7 out of 10.

== See also ==
- United States Army Special Forces in popular culture
- List of video games notable for negative reception
