= Mortal Kombat: Live Tour =

Martial arts theatrical stage show

Event promotional poster

Mortal Kombat: Live Tour was a martial art theatrical stage show featuring Mortal Kombat characters, sound, and laser light effects on stage.

It replicated Mortal Kombat martial arts and video game moves on stage mixed with dancing and music but removing the graphic violence the games were famed for in order to present a more family-friendly show. Lip synching were pre-recorded and used to demonstrate the official MK sound effects, but without more graphic violence or Fatalities. The audience participated by yelling "Run!" or "Kick him!" as part of the live action.

The show officially launched at Radio City Music Hall in New York City on September 14, 1995 - although some warm-up shows happened before this date - followed by a 200 city road trip of the United States into 1996. Tour promoter David Fishof then planned to take the show to Australia, Europe, South America and Asia.

== Plot ==
Three Earth warriors travel to Outworld to rescue their comrade and find an amulet that can defeat Shao Kahn and save Earth.

== Cast ==
- Baraka #1 — Ryan Watson
- Baraka #2 — Allen Sandoval
- Jax #1 — Hakim Alston
- Jax #2 — Shah Alston
- Jax #3 — Tyrone C. Wiggins
- Johnny Cage #1 — Jeffrey D. Harris
- Johnny Cage #2 — Brad Halstead
- Johnny Cage #3 — Ted Nordblum
- Johnny Cage #4 — Jeff Durbin
- Johnny Cage #5 — Garry Waugh
- Kabal — Tracy Fleming
- Kano — Joseph "Eddie" Acavedo
- Kano #2 — Mark Chemeleski
- Nightwolf #1 — Jeffery D. Harris
- Nightwolf #2 — Ted Nordblum
- King Baraka — Percy Brown
- Kitana #1 — Jennifer DeCosta
- Kitana #2 — Lexi Alexander (credited as Lexi Mirai)
- Liu Kang #1 — Carmichael Simon
- Liu Kang #2 — Jon Valera
- Liu Kang #3 — Allen Sandoval
- Liu Kang #4 — Michael Li
- Mileena — Jennifer DeCosta
- Mileena #2 — Lexi Alexander (credited as Lexi Mirai)
- Raiden — Garth Johnson
- Scorpion #1 — Anthony Demarco
- Scorpion #2 — Darius Wahrhaftig
- Scorpion #3 — Drew MacIver
- Shang Tsung #1 — Sidney S. Liufau
- Shang Tsung #2 — James Kim
- Shang Tsung #3 — Simon Kim
- Shang Tsung #4 — Michael Li
- Shang Tsung #5 — Jimim Kim
- Shang Tsung #6 — Drew MacIver
- Shao Kahn #1 — Jeffrey D. Harris
- Shao Kahn #2 — Ted Nordblum
- Sindel #1 — Eileen Weisinger
- Sindel #2 — June Castro
- Sonya #1 — Kerri Hoskins
- Sonya #2 — Cathleen Ann Gardner
- Sub Zero #1 — Ryan Watson
- Sub Zero #2 — Darius Wahrhaftig
- Sub Zero #3 — Drew MacIver

== Production ==
The tour was produced by Williams Entertainment, the publishers of Midway arcade games including the then-upcoming Mortal Kombat 3 and veteran tour promoter David Fishof, with executive producers Danny Simon and Threshold Entertainment CEO Lawrence Kasanoff. The lasers were produced by Laser Fantasy International of Seattle and operated by Dave Haskell and Chris Thornberry. A medium frame Spectra Physics and a 40 watt laser scope were used along with a custom fiber system for these effects.

The fight choreography was led by fight coordinator Pat Johnson along with writer and director Drew MacIver (who also occasionally portrayed Scorpion and Shang Tsung in the show), Raiden actor Garth Johnson, Tracy Fleming (Kabal), Barbara Bernhardt, and actor Cary-Hiroyuki Tagawa, who played Shang Tsung in the 1995 live action movie.

Jax actor Hakim Alston also appeared in the movie as an Outworld warrior, while Kerri Hoskins as Sonya Blade was the only actor from the show to also play the role in Mortal Kombat 3 the same year. She went on to portray the character in two more games, and provide likenesses for later games.

== Promotion ==
Promotional posters and magazine ads were widely circulated, and there was a lot of cross-promotion with other Mortal Kombat properties, including discount coupons for $2 off a full price admission ticket included in the Mortal Kombat 3 instruction booklet.

Promotional videos were also produced including reaction and comments from attendees of the opening weekend shows, and an Electronic Press kit was circulated to potential local promoters, venues and regional media outlets to drum up interest.

Several dates were the subject of local TV spots and ticket competitions, some of which have been digitized and available online, including Albany, Erie, Roanoke, Las Vegas and Rotterdam, and a sweepstakes competition for tickets to the opening weekend at Radio City Music Hall ran in New York Daily News

To promote the dates in the Los Angeles area, several cast members appeared on KTLA Morning News with Mark Kriski to discuss the tour and demonstrate some of the martial arts routines. The segment is included as part of the KTLA Video Vault on the official KTLA 5 YouTube channel.

== Tour Dates ==
The original 1995 run of Mortal Kombat: Live Tour had two separate touring companies running simultaneously, one covering the East and one covering the West.

Some dates, particularly at weekends, featured both matinee and evening performances.

A tentative list of dates and cities - but no venues - for the first six weeks of the tour was published during early marketing campaigns. Some other tentative dates can be seen during the electronic press kit video. These are shown below with no venue. Some had changed by the time the actual tour was confirmed.

Several dates in late September and early October 1995 were then postponed, with publicist Steven Style citing the need for more lasers and special effects to be added to the show before it could continue later in October when Mortal Kombat 3 will have hit most gaming console systems.

Confirmed Tentative Postponed/Cancelled

=== 1995 East United States ===
Date	Venue	City	Status
September 8, 1995	Memorial Auditorium	Burlington, VT	Confirmed
September 9, 1995	Memorial Auditorium	Burlington, VT	Confirmed
September 10, 1995		Poughkeepsie, NY	Tentative
September 11, 1995		Wilkes Barre, PA	Tentative
September 12, 1995		Wilkes Barre, PA	Tentative
September 14, 1995	Radio City Music Hall	New York, NY	Confirmed
September 15, 1995	Radio City Music Hall	New York, NY	Confirmed
September 16, 1995	Radio City Music Hall	New York, NY	Confirmed
September 17, 1995	Radio City Music Hall	New York, NY	Confirmed
September 20, 1995		Columbus, OH	Cancelled
September 21, 1995	Riverfront Coliseum	Cincinnati, OH	Postponed
September 22, 1995	Gund Arena	Cleveland, OH	Cancelled
September 23, 1995	Hersheypark Arena	Hershey, PA	Postponed
September 24, 1995		Pittsburgh, PA	Postponed
September 26, 1995		Wheeling, WV	Tentative
September 28, 1995		Detroit, MI	Tentative
September 29, 1995		Detroit, MI	Tentative
September 30, 1995		Detroit, MI	Tentative
September 30, 1995	Roberts Municipal Stadium	Evansville, IN	Postponed
October 1, 1995		Detroit, MI	Tentative
October 2, 1995		Erie, NY	Tentative
October 3, 1995		Utica, NY	Tentative
October 5, 1995		Ithaca, NY	Tentative
October 6, 1995		Lake Placid, NY	Cancelled
October 6, 1995	Knickerbocker Arena	Albany, NY	Postponed
October 7, 1995	Knickerbocker Arena	Albany, NY	Postponed
October 8, 1995	Nassau Coliseum	Uniondale, NY	Tentative
October 9, 1995	Nassau Coliseum	Uniondale, NY	Tentative
October 11, 1995		Huntington, WV	Tentative
October 12, 1995		Johnstown, PA	Postponed
October 13, 1995		Bethlehem, PA	Tentative
October 14, 1995	Providence Civic Center	Providence, RI	Postponed
October 15, 1995	Waterfront Entertainment Center	Camden, NJ	Confirmed
October 17, 1995	Richmond Coliseum	Richmond, VA	Confirmed
October 20, 1995	George Mason University Patriot Center	Fairfax, VA	Confirmed
October 21, 1995	US Air Arena	Landover, MD	Confirmed
October 24, 1995	Broome County Veterans Memorial Arena	Binghamton, NY	Confirmed
October 31, 1995		New Haven, CT	Tentative
November 9, 1995	Lawrence Joel Veterans Memorial Coliseum	Winston-Salem, NC	Confirmed
November 10, 1995		Raleigh, NC	Tentative
November 11, 1995		Charlotte, NC	Tentative
November 12, 1995	Boutwell Auditorium	Birmingham, AL	Confirmed
November 28, 1995	West Palm Beach Auditorium	West Palm Beach, FL	Confirmed
December 1, 1995	Orlando Arena	Orlando, FL	Confirmed
December 2, 1995	Orlando Arena	Orlando, FL	Confirmed
December 3, 1995	Orlando Arena	Orlando, FL	Confirmed

=== 1995 West United States ===
Date	Venue	City	Status
September 8, 1995	Puyallup Fairgrounds	Puyallup, WA	Confirmed
September 10, 1995	Four Seasons Arena	Great Falls, MT	Confirmed
September 12, 1995	Fargodome	Fargo, ND	Postponed
September 13, 1995	All Seasons Arena	Minot, ND	Postponed
September 15, 1995	Rosemont Horizon	Rosemont, IL	Postponed
September 16, 1995	Rosemont Horizon	Rosemont, IL	Postponed
September 17, 1995	Rosemont Horizon	Rosemont, IL	Postponed
September 20, 1995		New Orleans, LA	Tentative
September 21, 1995	Cajundome	Lafayette, LA	Postponed
September 22, 1995	Lake Charles Civic Center	Lake Charles, LA	Postponed
September 23, 1995		Houston, TX	Postponed
September 24, 1995		Austin, TX	Postponed
September 26, 1995		Baton Rouge, LA	Tentative
September 28, 1995	Ferrell Center	Waco, TX	Tentative
September 29, 1995		Tyler, TX	Tentative
September 30, 1995		Fort Worth, TX	Postponed
October 1, 1995		Dallas, TX	Postponed
October 3, 1995		Monroe, LA	Tentative
October 4, 1995		Shreveport, LA	Tentative
October 6, 1995		San Antonio, TX	Postponed
October 7, 1995		San Antonio, TX	Postponed
October 8, 1995	Memorial Coliseum	Corpus Christi, TX	Tentative
October 10, 1995		San Angelo, TX	Tentative
October 11, 1995		Odessa, TX	Tentative
October 13, 1995		Amarillo, TX	Tentative
October 14, 1995		Lubbock, TX	Tentative
October 15, 1995	County Coliseum	El Paso, TX	Confirmed
October 18, 1995	Thomas & Mack Center	Las Vegas, NV	Confirmed
October 21, 1995	Arrowhead Pond of Anaheim	Anaheim, CA	Confirmed
October 22, 1995	Great Western Forum	Inglewood, CA	Confirmed
October 24, 1995	San Jose Arena	San Jose, CA	Confirmed
October 25, 1995	Oakland Coliseum	Oakland, CA	Confirmed
October 26, 1995	Oakland Coliseum	Oakland, CA	Confirmed
October 28, 1995	Arizona Veterans Memorial Coliseum	Phoenix, AZ	Confirmed
October 29, 1995	Arizona Veterans Memorial Coliseum	Phoenix, AZ	Confirmed
November 5, 1995	Bell County Expo Center	Belton, TX	Confirmed
November 9, 1995	Beaumont Civic Center	Beaumont, TX	Confirmed
November 17, 1995	Cajundome	Lafayette, LA	Confirmed
November 18, 1995	Lake Charles Civic Center	Lake Charles, LA	Confirmed
November 22, 1995	BSU Pavilion	Boise, ID	Confirmed

=== 1996 United States ===
Date	Venue	City	Status
January 11, 1996	John F. Savage Hall	Toledo, OH	Confirmed
January 12, 1996	Ervin J. Nutter Center	Dayton, OH	Confirmed
January 13, 1996	Wings Stadium	Kalamazoo, MI	Confirmed
January 14, 1996	Wendler Arena	Saginaw, MI	Confirmed
January 17, 1996	Breslin Center	Lansing, MI	Confirmed
January 18, 1996	Market Square Arena	Indianapolis, IN	Confirmed
January 21, 1996	Riverfront Coliseum	Cincinnati, OH	Confirmed
January 24, 1996	Rupp Arena	Lexington, KY	Confirmed
January 25, 1996	Louisville Gardens	Louisville, KY	Confirmed
January 26, 1996	Kiel Center	St. Louis, MO	Confirmed
January 28, 1996	La Crosse Center	La Crosse, MN	Confirmed
February 1, 1996	Prairie Capital Convention Center	Springfield, IL	Confirmed
February 2, 1996	The MARK of The Quad Cities	Moline, IL	Confirmed
February 3, 1996	Municipal Auditorium	Kansas City, MO	Confirmed
February 4, 1996	Abou Ben Adhem Shrine Mosque	Springfield, MO	Confirmed
February 6, 1996	Mayo Civic Center	Rochester, MN	Confirmed
February 10, 1996	Northrop Auditorium	Minneapolis, MN	Confirmed
February 14, 1996	Sioux Falls Arena	Sioux Falls, SD	Confirmed
February 15, 1996	Municipal Auditorium	Sioux City, IA	Confirmed
February 16, 1996	Bramlage Coliseum	Manhattan, KS	Confirmed
February 17, 1996		Wichita, KS	Confirmed
February 19, 1996	The Pyramid	Memphis, TN	Confirmed
February 21, 1996	Knoxville Civic Auditorium	Knoxville, TN	Confirmed
February 22, 1996	Roanoke Civic Center Coliseum	Roanoke, VA	Confirmed
February 23, 1996	George Mason University Patriot Center	Fairfax, VA	Confirmed
February 24, 1996	A.J. Palumbo Center	Pittsburgh, PA	Confirmed
February 27, 1996	Warner Theatre	Erie, PA	Confirmed
February 28, 1996	Warner Theatre	Erie, PA	Confirmed
March 1, 1996	Landmark Theater	Syracuse, NY	Confirmed
March 3, 1996	Community War Memorial	Rochester, NY	Confirmed
March 5, 1996	Mid Hudson Civic Center	Poughkeepsie, NY	Confirmed
March 6, 1996	Broome County Veterans Memorial Arena	Binghamton, NY	Confirmed
March 7, 1996	Cambria County War Memorial Arena	Johnstown, PA	Confirmed
March 8, 1996	Springfield Civic Center	Springfield, MA	Confirmed
March 9, 1996	Palace Theater	New Haven, CT	Confirmed
March 14, 1996	Palmer Auditorium	Austin, TX	Confirmed
March 15, 1996	Palmer Auditorium	Austin, TX	Confirmed
March 16, 1996	Astroarena	Houston, TX	Confirmed
March 17, 1996	Astroarena	Houston, TX	Confirmed
March 20, 1996	Will Rogers Auditorium	Forth Worth, TX	Confirmed
March 21, 1996	Will Rogers Auditorium	Forth Worth, TX	Confirmed
March 22, 1996	Bronco Bowl	Dallas, TX	Confirmed
March 23, 1996	Bronco Bowl	Dallas, TX	Confirmed
March 24, 1996	Bronco Bowl	Dallas, TX	Confirmed

=== 1996 Rest of The World ===
Date	Venue	City	Status
September 13, 1996	Olympia Theatre	Dublin, Ireland	Confirmed
September 21, 1996	Olympia Theatre	Dublin, Ireland	Confirmed
September 22, 1996	Olympia Theatre	Dublin, Ireland	Confirmed
September 28, 1996	Ahoy	Rotterdam, Netherlands	Cancelled
September 29, 1996	Ahoy	Rotterdam, Netherlands	Cancelled

Other cities known to have had dates on this run:

- Buenos Aires, Argentina (two dates in 1996, filmed and televised locally on a now-defunct TV station called Rocket. Clips from the broadcast are available online)

== Tickets and Merchandise ==
Tickets ranged from $10 to $25 for the 90-minute show, which featured giant screens surrounding the stage to give audiences in larger venues a closer view of the action.

A range of merchandise could be purchased at the shows, including t-shirts, headbands, and a "collectible tourbook" which included some secret codes for the Mortal Kombat 3 game and a page for autographs. Some dates included post-show signing and photograph sessions with some of the cast members at additional costs.

Replicas of the amulets used in the story line were also available and one of the interactive elements of show saw the characters encouraging the audience to rush to the merchandise stands to buy them in order to help save Earth. A review in The New York Times during the opening weekend at Radio City Music Hall commented on the irony that the merchandise company hadn't actually completed the manufacture of the amulets when the tour started, so no one could buy any at those shows.

== Reception ==
=== Critical response ===
Following its announcement, the tour met with opposition from people and organisations which expressed skepticism over the claims that the violence in the show would be appropriately toned down from the famed video games. The Los Angeles Times published a preview article in August 1995 before the tour started including comments from promoter David Fishof defending the show, while Los Angeles Alliance for Survival director Jerry Rubin accused it of being "really nothing more than two-hour promotions for the most violent video game ever," and California Attorney General Daniel E. Lundgren said the show highlights "the inescapable fact that ‘Mortal Kombat’ in all its forms is being marketed--sometimes in subtle ways and sometimes not so subtly--to children."

Many newspaper reviews at the time were less than complimentary about the theatrical validity of the show, but had to concede that the fight action, spectacle and interactive aspects were ideal for young children, with the New York Times calling it an "action fantasy spectacle" and United Press International commenting on the "over-the-top visual production employing a plethora of lasers and pyrotechnic special effects [was] guaranteed to keep the tiniest toddler in the audience awake" while noting that opening night didn't sell out, although the Saturday and Sunday nights of the opening weekend were more heavily sold. After the postponement in September/October 1995 in order to improve the show, it still didn't sell well in some markets.

In 2011, 1UP.com featured the show in the article "The Top Ten Times Mortal Kombat Went Wrong" and GamesRadar ranked it as number one on the list of "most absurd Mortal Kombat offshoots".
