= Mortal Kombat: Deadly Alliance =

2002 video game

- North American cover art
- Developer: Midway
- Publisher: Midway
- Director: Ed Boon
- Producers: John Podlasek; Srini Chilukuri; Paulo Garcia; Brian LeBaron
- Designer: Ed Boon
- Programmers: Michael Boon; Jon Greenberg; Jay Biondo
- Artists: Tony Goskie; Steve Beran; Herman Sanchez
- Writers: John Vogel; Alexander Barrentine
- Composers: Dan Forden; Rich Carle; Vince Pontarelli; Eric Huffman
- Series: Mortal Kombat
- Engine: RenderWare
- Platforms: GameCube, PlayStation 2, Xbox, Game Boy Advance
- Release: GameCube, PlayStation 2, Xbox: NA: November 22, 2002; PAL: February 14, 2003; Game Boy Advance: NA: November 22, 2002; PAL: February 14, 2003; Tournament Edition: NA: August 25, 2003
- Genre: Fighting
- Modes: Single-player, multiplayer

Mortal Kombat: Deadly Alliance is a 2002 fighting game developed and published by Midway for the Xbox, PS2, GameCube, and GBA. It was the first all-new Mortal Kombat fighting game produced exclusively for home consoles, with no preceding arcade release. It is the fifth main installment in the Mortal Kombat franchise and a sequel to 1997's Mortal Kombat 4. Its story focuses on the eponymous alliance between sorcerers Quan Chi and Shang Tsung and their schemes to revive an ancient army to conquer Outworld and Earthrealm. The game is the only main installment not to feature series protagonist Liu Kang as a playable character. It is also the first game in the canon series to not have the involvement of co-creator John Tobias, who had left Midway in 1999 to pursue other interests.

In addition to the original GBA port of Deadly Alliance, a second version for the same console, entitled Mortal Kombat: Tournament Edition, was released on August 25, 2003. Tournament Edition featured characters omitted from the first port, along with characters not present in the other versions, such as Sektor, Noob Saibot, and Sareena. Deadly Alliance received positive reviews from critics. Deadly Alliance was followed by a sequel in 2004, titled Mortal Kombat: Deception.

== Gameplay ==
Gameplay screenshot of a fight between Scorpion and Sub-Zero

Like all the Mortal Kombat games, Deadly Alliance focuses heavily on its fighting modes. The gameplay is completely different from that of previous entries in the franchise. Each character now possesses three individual fighting styles, generally two hand-to-hand styles and one weapon style (except for Blaze and Mokap, who received three hand-to-hand styles and no weapon style) which players can switch between with the push of a button. In previous games, aside from "dial-a-combos", all the characters fought virtually identically, with only special moves to differentiate them. The number of special moves per character (usable in any fighting style) has also been reduced, varying only from two to four for most, thus forcing the player to use the improved fighting system. The characters can no longer run, and there is no run meter. However, while still limited to moving only into the background and foreground, movement in the third dimension is much easier and can be used continuously (in Mortal Kombat 4, sidestepping was mapped to two different buttons and could be performed at about 1 second intervals). To prevent fighters from leaving the arena, invisible boundaries appear when a fighter is knocked against the edge.

Character models became more realistic. Flesh will move or jiggle on a character as he or she moves around. Environmental interaction is present, but infrequent. Several levels include obstacles—such as pillars or statues—that can be shattered to damage an opponent standing near one. There is just one Fatality per character, while the previous games included many ways to finish the opponent. Like Mortal Kombat X (until the XL patch added them to Mortal Kombat X) and Mortal Kombat 1, the game does not include Stage Fatalities. However, the Acid Bath level still possesses special acid-vomiting statues called Acid Buddhas that do damage directly to fighters that stray too close to them.

Deadly Alliance introduces the Konquest mode, which expands on the storyline and acts as a tutorial for each character. The Konquest mode consists of a series of missions completed by each character. Between each sequence, a video of a monk moving through various locations along the path of Konquest is shown, but it has no direct bearing on gameplay other than to simulate the sense of a journey. After completing eight initial "kombat tasks" with Sub-Zero, the player is instructed to complete a specific set of tasks with each character, which vary from performing difficult combos to defeating opponents. Each series comes with text instructions, including a basic storyline that delves further into each character's background and motives. Blaze and Mokap can only be unlocked by completing all stages of konquest. Upon completing each mission (of a starting difficulty for each character that increases per mission), the player is rewarded with many "koins" that act as the in-game currency to open koffins in the krypt and unlock secrets in the game.

The krypt is a feature in which the player can buy extras with koins earned in regular play and konquest mode. The krypt consists of 676 "koffins" arranged in a square format with each designated alphabetically by a two-letter designation (AA–ZZ). The koffins are filled with many secrets and unlockables. Each koffin has a different designated price, listed in a number (anywhere from 1 up to the thousands) and type (Gold, Ruby, Sapphire, Jade, Onyx, and Platinum) of koins that it would cost to open the koffin. The Krypt includes unlockable characters, arenas, and alternative costumes. Also included among the koffins are various videos, images, concept sketches, and the entire Mortal Kombat Collector's Edition comic book. Some koffins contained koins that could be used towards other koffins, others contained hints as to where other items were located, and others were even empty.

Test Your Might, the original minigame of the Mortal Kombat series, returns for the first time since the original game; a variation, Test Your Sight, is also included. In Test Your Sight, the character stands in front of a set of cups, and the game shows the player which cup contains the 'Mortal Kombat' logo. The cups then move randomly; by the end, one must select the cup containing the icon. As the player progresses through the minigame, the number of cups increases, as does the speed at which the cups move. At higher levels, the camera would even move to make it more difficult for the player to track the icon's movement. Succeeding at both Test Your Might and Test Your Sight rewards the player with koins.

The GBA-only Mortal Kombat: Tournament Edition adds three modes: Survival, Tag Team, and Practice, and weapon Fatalities. Although both GBA versions feature 2D sprites, Tournament Edition was the first portable Mortal Kombat game to feature 3D- style gameplay.

== Plot ==
At the end of Mortal Kombat 4 (which is Scorpion's canon ending), Quan Chi revealed himself to be the murderer of Scorpion's family and clan, before attempting to send him back to the Netherrealm. Scorpion, fueled with homicidal rage, grabbed Quan Chi at the last minute, taking the sorcerer with him. In the opening intro to Deadly Alliance, it is revealed that Quan Chi was able to escape the Netherrealm, using the amulet he had stolen from Shinnok. He appears in a tomb containing several mummified remains and an ancient runestone, which reveals that the remains are the "undefeatable" army of the long-forgotten ruler of Outworld, known simply as the "Dragon King". Learning that it can be revived, Quan Chi allies with Shang Tsung, offering him an endless supply of souls in return for his transplanting the souls of defeated warriors into the army. The two work together to defeat and kill Shao Kahn and Liu Kang, the two greatest threats to their plans. Unable to interfere as an Elder God, Raiden surrenders his status after realizing that, should the alliance be victorious, Earthrealm is doomed.

In Deadly Alliance, the player learns about the characters' backstories and relationships, primarily during Konquest mode, as well as through biographies obtainable in the Krypt. The game is set in a science fantasy world, with most events taking place in the fictional realms of the Mortal Kombat series. The story begins in the Netherrealm and later shifts to Outworld, Edenia, and eventually Earthrealm. To fully understand the plot of Deadly Alliance, the player must complete the Konquest mode and the Arcade mode. Completing the Arcade mode unlocks endings for each character, but only a few endings or parts of them are considered part of the continuity of the Mortal Kombat storyline. Some endings even contradict one another. What happened to the characters was revealed only in the sequel, making Deadly Alliance the first game in the series to have an in-continuity ending in which the heroes lose, and the villains emerge victorious.

== Characters ==
The game features 21 playable characters, 2 additional secret characters, and 1 unplayable.

New characters:

- Blaze – Massive fire elemental who has the task of guarding the egg of the Dragon King (secret character).
- Bo' Rai Cho – Jovial Outworld native and former trainer of Liu Kang.
- Drahmin – A Netherrealm Oni seeking revenge against Quan Chi for abandoning him in the realm after helping the sorcerer escape.
- Frost – Sub-Zero's first Lin Kuei trainee, who lacks humility.
- Hsu Hao – Red Dragon operative sent to infiltrate and destroy the OIA.
- Kenshi – A blind swordsman who was employed briefly by the OIA before the portal was destroyed, blinding him and stranding him in Outworld.
- Li Mei – Outworld native whose people are enslaved by the Deadly Alliance. She enters a tournament sponsored by the sorcerers, hoping to win their freedom.
- Mavado – Red Dragon mastermind who ordered Hsu Hao to infiltrate the OIA. Kills Kabal, stealing his hook swords.
- Mokap – Joke character said to have done motion capture work for Johnny Cage's films. Included in the game as an homage to Midway graphic artist Carlos Pesina, who portrayed several characters in the digitized Mortal Kombat games and performed motion capture work for Deadly Alliance (secret character).
- Moloch – Drahmin's fellow and the game's sub-boss (unplayable character).
- Nitara – A manipulative vampiress seeking to separate her home realm from Outworld.

Returning characters:

- Cyrax – A former Lin Kuei cyborg rescued by Jax and Sonya and recruited for the OIA, he is stranded in Outworld and manipulated by Nitara.
- Jax – Established the Outerworld Investigation Agency with Sonya, who was betrayed by an OIA operative who destroyed the agency's portal.
- Johnny Cage – Hollywood actor whose career is now marked with mockery and who hopes to restore his image.
- Kano – Black Dragon leader and longtime enemy of Sonya and Jax.
- Kitana – Edenian princess who allied with Goro to wage war against Shao Kahn, and eventually the Deadly Alliance.
- Kung Lao – Shaolin monk who seeks vengeance for his friend Liu Kang's death.
- Quan Chi – Nefarious self-serving sorcerer who struck the deal with Shang Tsung.
- Raiden – The thunder god who resumes his lesser-god status to help against the Deadly Alliance.
- Reptile – The remaining member of the Zaterrian race, and an expert infiltrator.
- Scorpion – Quan Chi's tormentor who has left the Netherrealm to pursue the sorcerer.
- Shang Tsung – The sorcerer who seeks immortality.
- Sonya Blade – Partner to Jax, who feels responsible for the disappearance of the two agents of the OIA lost in Outworld when the portal was destroyed.
- Sub-Zero – Cryokinetic warrior who reestablishes the Lin Kuei as a force for good and solicits new members.

Deadly Alliance is notable for being the only game in the main series that does not feature Liu Kang as a playable character, as he and Shao Kahn only appear in the introduction video. Also mentioned in Konquest are the deaths of Goro, Kabal, Motaro, and Sheeva, but they would later appear in sequels. The Dragon King mentioned in the game would later appear as Onaga in the sequel Mortal Kombat: Deception.

Due to hardware limitations, the Game Boy Advance port of Deadly Alliance features only 12 of the 21 playable characters: Frost, Jax, Kano, Kung Lao, Kenshi, Kitana, Li Mei, Quan Chi, Scorpion, Shang Tsung, Sonya Blade, and Sub-Zero. A second port, subtitled Tournament Edition, retains only Quan Chi, Scorpion, and Shang Tsung, while adding Bo' Rai Cho, Cyrax, Drahmin, Hsu Hao, Johnny Cage, Mavado, Nitara, Raiden, and Reptile. Tournament Edition also adds three extra characters that were not present in the other versions: Sektor (a Cyrax palette swap), Noob Saibot (a Scorpion palette swap), and Sareena from the action-adventure spin-off Mortal Kombat Mythologies: Sub-Zero. Both versions exclude Blaze, Mokap, and Moloch. Tournament Edition is the only Mortal Kombat fighting game that does not feature Sub-Zero in any form. However, Noob Saibot would be revealed as the original Sub-Zero in Mortal Kombat: Deception.

== Development ==
Midway announced in early 1998 that work had begun on a fifth mainline Mortal Kombat game, and that it was being developed for Midway's new Zeus II arcade hardware.

Despite the success of Mortal Kombat 4, the series began to suffer from overexposure by the late 1990s, spawning mostly failed or mediocre projects. The 1996 animated series Mortal Kombat: Defenders of the Realm lasted only one season while receiving negative reception from critics, and in November 1997, the film Mortal Kombat Annihilation, the sequel to the successful 1995 original, underperformed in theaters and was panned by critics. Despite strong ratings, the 1998 live-action series Mortal Kombat: Conquest lasted only one season. On the game front, the side-scrolling Mortal Kombat Mythologies: Sub-Zero was met with limited interest, as was the 1999 Dreamcast port of MK4 titled Mortal Kombat Gold. Negative reception and terrible sales beset 2000's Mortal Kombat: Special Forces.

Deadly Alliance was the first Mortal Kombat mainline title to be developed directly for home consoles, as Midway had exited the waning arcade market after their 2000 release The Grid. Producer Ed Boon said that without "designing the game so it would take a quarter from you every two and a half minutes", there could be a bigger focus on single-player play.

== Release ==
To help promote the game, American rock band Adema recorded a song for the game titled "Immortal" and made a music video for it that featured Scorpion. The song was used in many of the game's commercials. The music video is included in the game's extras, along with a short live video from Adema's 2002 E3 performance. Mortal Kombat: Deadly Alliance was released in the UK on Valentine's Day 2003. One special ad had a girl hugging her boyfriend, and as she pulled away, there were bloody handprints where her hands had been on his back.

Following the original GBA port of Mortal Kombat: Deadly Alliance, a second version entitled Mortal Kombat: Tournament Edition was released on August 25, 2003. The game features the remaining playable characters omitted from the first version (with only Quan Chi, Shang Tsung, and Scorpion returning) plus three exclusive characters: Noob Saibot, Sareena, and Sektor. Both GBA versions were re-released as part of the Mortal Kombat: Legacy Kollection compilation in 2025.

== Reception ==
Reception

Aggregate scores
Aggregator	Score
GameRankings	PS2: 81.90% GCN: 81.82% Xbox: 82.60% GBA: 84.63%
Metacritic	PS2: 79% GCN: 81%

Review scores
Publication	Score
AllGame	GBA: 2.5/5; PS2/GCN/Xbox:3.5/5
Electronic Gaming Monthly	(PS2) 6/10, 5/10, 8.5/10
GameSpot	PS2/GCN/Xbox: 8.1/10; GBA: 7.9/10.0
GameSpy	PS2/GCN/Xbox: 4/5
IGN	PS2/GCN/Xbox: 8.6/10; GBA: 8.8/10

The reception for Mortal Kombat: Deadly Alliance was generally favorable, as it both revived a series that had been waning since the late 1990s and introduced many innovations. Jeremy Dunham of IGN praised the game for reinventing the Mortal Kombat formula, pointing specifically to Ed Boon's implementation of "true three-dimensional fighting, entirely different fighting styles, and a deeper, more intuitive combo system." Jeff Gerstmann of GameSpot commended Deadly Alliance for its fluid animation and graphics, and stated that the roster was a "good mix of old and new faces." Likewise, Benjamin Turner of GameSpy welcomed the addition of new characters to the roster, and was complimentary of the new fighting system: "You can just sit back, turn your brain off, and beat people to bloody pulps." IGN's Craig Harris lauded the Game Boy Advance version for its polish and content, stating that "a lot of attention was poured into this project, from the fighting and graphics engine, to establishing enough presentation and extras to make the game an excellent single-player title."

GameSpot declared Deadly Alliance the second-best GameCube release of November 2002, and gave the game its annual "Best Fighting Game on Xbox" and "Best Fighting Game on GameCube" awards. It also won the Best Brawl award at G-Phoria in 2003, and later would also be included on the best-seller budget lines for all three consoles, PlayStation 2's Greatest Hits, GameCube's Player's Choice, and Xbox's Platinum Hits. During the 6th Annual Interactive Achievement Awards, the Academy of Interactive Arts & Sciences nominated Deadly Alliance for "Console Fighting Game of the Year", which it ultimately lost to Tekken 4.

=== Sales ===
Upon release, the game sold more than 350,000 units in nine days, 1 million in its first month, and more than 1.3 million by January 2003. Adema's "Immortal" soundtrack disc also sold 24,000 units in the USA.

By July 2003, according to IGN, Deadly Alliance had sold 2 million copies. In April 2011, Ed Boon said the game had sold 3.5 million units. According to a Dunham's retrospective in IGN, Deadly Alliance "instantly won over critics and fans alike, earning the best reviews of the series since Mortal Kombat II, and moving a million copies within 6 weeks. Deadly Alliance would eventually go on to more than double that figure."
