= Trevor Goddard =

English actor (1962–2003)

- Goddard as CMDR Brumby from JAG
- Born: Trevor Joseph Goddard; 14 October 1962; Croydon, London, England
- Died: 7 June 2003 (aged 40); North Hollywood, California, U.S.
- Occupations: Boxer, actor
- Years active: 1989–2003
- Spouse: Ruthann Goddard (m. 1991; sep. 2003)
- Children: 2

Trevor Joseph Goddard (14 October 1962 – 7 June 2003) was an English actor. He was best known for playing Kano in the martial arts film Mortal Kombat, a live action adaptation of the popular video game series, Lieutenant Commander Mic Brumby in the television series JAG and main villain Keefer in the action film Men of War (with Dolph Lundgren and JAG co-star Catherine Bell).

== Early life ==
Goddard was born in Croydon, London, England, in 1962. Between 1974 and 1979, he attended Ravensbourne School, Hayes Lane, Bromley, London. A punk in 1977, he helped form a band at school called The Belsen Horrors (the name of which came from a Sex Pistols track). First a drummer, then the lead singer, he and his band lasted until 1978. Later, sometime between 1979 and 1980, he was the drummer in another Bromley punk band called The Vamp. This group was led by Wayne Cregan, who was one of the first members of X-Ray Spex. Bromley was closely linked with the early punk movement – first through the Bromley Contingent (the first fans of the Sex Pistols), and three famous punk singers who came from this town: Poly Styrene (X-Ray Spex), Siouxsie Sioux (of Siouxsie and the Banshees) and Billy Idol – who like Trevor, attended Ravensbourne School for Boys.

For much of his career, he claimed to be of Australian descent and often played Australian characters.

== Career ==
He appeared in cameo roles in many television shows prior to 1995. That same year, Goddard played Kano in the film adaptation of Mortal Kombat. His performance as Kano became the source of the character's evolution in the video games. However his accent in the film was mistakenly interpreted as Australian, which led to Kano being portrayed as an Australian in future installments.

He would go on to act in other films such as Gone in Sixty Seconds, Men of War (with Dolph Lundgren and future JAG co-star Catherine Bell) and Hollywood Vampyr. He played a short-tempered mercenary in the 1998 film Deep Rising with Treat Williams and Famke Janssen. Goddard played in the television drama series JAG as Lieutenant Commander Mic Brumby and was featured in TV commercials for the Hoover FloorMate.

He made his last on-screen appearance in the 2003 film Pirates of the Caribbean: The Curse of the Black Pearl, released a month after his death.

== Death ==
On 8 June 2003, Goddard was found dead in his home in North Hollywood, Los Angeles, California. He was 40 years old. Initial reports indicated that Goddard was in the process of getting a divorce and that suicide was suspected. An autopsy later showed that Goddard died from an accidental drug overdose of heroin, cocaine, temazepam and vicodin.

== Filmography ==
=== Film ===
Year	Title	Role	Notes
1992	Inside Out	The Other Criminal	Segment: "The Leda"; Direct-to-video release
1994	Men of War	Keefer	
1995	Mortal Kombat	Kano	
1995	Illegal in Blue	Mickey Fuller	Direct-to-video release
1995	The Break	Nails	
1996	Fast Money	Regy	
1996	Prey of the Jaguar	Damian Bandera	Direct-to-video release
1997	Dead Tides	Scott	
1997	First Encounter		
1998	Deep Rising	T. Ray	
1998	Some Girl	Ravi	Alternative titles: Men; Girl Talk
1999	She's Too Tall	Warner	
1999	Gut Feeling		
2000	Gone in 60 Seconds	Don	Uncredited
2001	Dead Man's Run	Jason	
2002	Hollywood Vampyr	Blood	
2002	Torture TV	Trevor "Dogger" McDougan	
2003	Pirates of the Caribbean: The Curse of the Black Pearl	Grapple	Released posthumously
2010	Flexing with Monty	Monty	Direct-to-video; released posthumously

=== Television ===
Year	Title	Role	Notes
1989	Tour of Duty	Williams	1 episode
1992	Dark Justice	Travis	1 episode
1992	The Commish	Ozzy Van Spyk	2 episodes
1992–1994	Silk Stalkings	Steiner; Oscar LeMay	2 episodes
1992–1995	Renegade	Digger Macy; Ty Waitly	2 episodes
1993	Murphy Brown	Colin	1 episode
1993	Down the Shore	Stench	1 episode
1993	Baywatch	Wiley Brown	1 episode
1993	Empty Nest	Joe	1 episode
1996	Murder, She Wrote	Boyd Hendrix	1 episode
1996	Nowhere Man	Mackie	1 episode
1996	Yesterday's Target	Agent Riggs	Television film
1997	Assault on Devil's Island	Fraker	Television film Alternative title: Shadow Warriors
1998	Babylon 5	Trace	1 episode
1998	The X-Files	The 1st British Crewman	1 episode
1998	Legion	Cutter	Television film
1998–2001	JAG	Lieutenant Commander Mic Brumby	42 episodes
2000	18 Wheels of Justice	Paul Stocker	1 episode
2001	When Billie Beat Bobby	Barry Court	Television film
2002	Rendez-View		1 episode
