= Mortal Kombat: Shaolin Monks =

2005 video game

- North American cover art, featuring Goro in the background, and Kung Lao, Liu Kang, Baraka and Scorpion in the foreground
- Developer: Midway Studios Los Angeles
- Publisher: Midway
- Director: Ed Boon
- Producers: Ed Boon; Shaun Himmerick; Barclay Smith
- Designers: Adam Puhl; John Edwards; Luke Whiteside
- Programmer: David Gautrey
- Artists: Steve Beran; Tony Goskie; Mark Lappin
- Writers: James Krueger; John Vogel; Jon Greenberg
- Composers: Chase Ashbaker; Richard Carle; Brian Chard; Vincent Pontarelli
- Series: Mortal Kombat
- Platforms: PlayStation 2, Xbox
- Release: NA: September 19, 2005; PAL: September 30, 2005
- Genres: Action-adventure, beat 'em up
- Modes: Single-player, multiplayer

Mortal Kombat: Shaolin Monks is a 2005 action-adventure game developed and published by Midway for the PlayStation 2 and Xbox. A spin-off of the Mortal Kombat franchise, it is a retelling of the events of Mortal Kombat II (1993). Players control the eponymous Shaolin monks Liu Kang and Kung Lao in either single player or cooperative play as they protect Earthrealm from the forces of Outworld.

A spin-off centered on Liu Kang had been considered since the early 2000s, but was shelved after negative reception to the previous adventure spin-offs, Mythologies: Sub-Zero (1997) and Special Forces (2000). Shaolin Monks was officially announced in 2004 as part of Midway's plan to release Mortal Kombat games annually. Developed with the intent of appealing to Mortal Kombat fans, Shaolin Monks incorporates elements from the fighting game entries, including Fatalities, combos, and a versus mode.

Released in North America on September 19, 2005, the game received positive reviews for transitioning the series into an adventure game and its co-op mode, although reception to the narrative, visuals, high difficulty and short length were mixed. It was also a commercial success, selling over one million copies.

== Gameplay ==
A gameplay screenshot of Liu Kang fighting against Oni enemies

The game features three main modes of play. Aside from a single-player mode, the game has a co-operative mode, where two players can work together through the game, with access to some areas and items that are inaccessible in single-player mode. There is also a versus mode, where two players can fight against each other in some of the arenas featured in the game. In addition, players can play a shortened, censored demo version of The Suffering: Ties That Bind as well as an emulated arcade perfect version of Mortal Kombat II (which is taken from Midway Arcade Treasures 2; developed by Digital Eclipse).

Shaolin Monks features a multi-directional combat system, which gives players the ability to attack any of the enemies that surround them fluidly. The engine allows the player to maintain combo attacks across multiple enemies, and even continue their combos after launching an enemy into the air through a powerful attack or a throw. The main characters also have many of their signature moves from the series. Combos and special moves are upgradeable through the earning of experience points. These are mainly gained through defeating opponents, with the combo system multiplying the value. The environment plays a vital role in the game, as there are several hazards that will instantly kill an enemy, such as pits in the floor or rotating wheels of spikes. Using some of the environment in this manner, as well as attacking or destroying certain objects, serve as a puzzle-solving element to unlock secrets in the game.

The game also includes Fatalities, a common feature of the Mortal Kombat series. Performing combos on enemies increases the Fatality meter. Once that meter has reached a certain level, a Fatality may be performed, regardless of an opponent's level of health. The main characters have the ability to perform several different Fatality moves, some of which are 3D updated versions of Fatalities from the first and second Mortal Kombat games. The player can also unlock the ability to do Multalities, which are Fatalities performed on multiple enemies at once. The concept of Brutalities from Ultimate Mortal Kombat 3/Mortal Kombat Trilogy has also been brought back, though with a different function. Once the move has been performed, the player is able to give more devastating attacks for a limited time.

== Synopsis ==
=== Characters ===
The primary protagonists of Shaolin Monks are Liu Kang and Kung Lao. Featured as allies of the protagonists are Raiden, Johnny Cage, Kitana, Sub-Zero, and Jax. Most of the allies make appearances to assist the protagonists during segments of the game. Depicted as enemies of the protagonists are Shao Kahn, Shang Tsung, Mileena, Jade, Reptile, Baraka, Goro, Scorpion, and Kintaro. These characters serve as bosses for the game's levels. Ermac and Kano can also be fought as optional bosses. Further characters featured are Sonya Blade, Kabal, Noob Saibot, and Quan Chi, who mostly only appear in cinematics. Smoke, in reference to his Mortal Kombat II depiction, is found in the Living Forest where he assigns the player optional missions required to unlock Mortal Kombat II. Also in reference to the second game, Blaze appears fighting his unnamed opponent in the background of the Pit II. Upon completing the game, Sub-Zero and Scorpion become unlocked as playable characters in the story mode, although the story is unchanged. The versus mode features Liu Kang, Kung Lao, Scorpion, Sub-Zero, Johnny Cage, Kitana, Reptile, and Baraka as the playable characters; all but Liu Kang and Kung Lao are unlocked through collecting tokens found in the story.

=== Story ===
Mortal Kombat: Shaolin Monks spans the events of Mortal Kombat II, starting with the aftermath of the first Mortal Kombat. The battle rages furiously on Shang Tsung's island fortress in the Lost Sea, as the sorcerer watches the fighters battle his soldiers to protect Earthrealm. The Earthrealm's Shaolin monk Liu Kang defeats Shang Tsung, and the warrior Goro comes to his defense. With Goro distracting everyone else, Shang Tsung creates a portal to Outworld and retreats with his allies. Thunder god Raiden appears afterwards and warns the remaining fighters to get off the island palace because it is collapsing into the sea. Everyone, except Liu Kang and Kung Lao, evacuates and escape back to the Wu Shi Academy.

Liu Kang and Kung Lao, however, have to fight their way to another portal to get to Wu Shi Academy. Upon arrival, Raiden awards his warriors for saving Earthrealm. However, Baraka and the Tarkatan attack the Wu Shi Academy. Although the Tarkatans are defeated, Baraka captures Sonya Blade. Raiden confirms that Shang Tsung is trying to lure Liu Kang and his allies to Outworld where he can order his henchmen to attack them and bide his time for power. If successful, Shang Tsung will conquer Earth without winning a Mortal Kombat tournament, which is cheating.

Liu Kang and Kung Lao journey through the nightmarish realm of Outworld to stop the sorcerer's plot. They are guided by Raiden and assisted by Johnny Cage. Throughout their journeys, they meet several allies and learn of another person who wants Earth; the Emperor of Outworld, Shao Kahn. During their journey, all of Liu Kang's and Kung Lao's allies are captured. Once reaching Shao Kahn, Shang Tsung is revealed to have been impersonating Raiden on occasion in the pair's journey so that each of the soldier's defeats will enhance his powers enough to steal Shao Kahn's rule of Outworld.

The two Shaolin Monks defeat Shang Tsung and Kintaro, and are challenged by Shao Kahn. With the real Raiden's help, Liu Kang and Kung Lao kill the Emperor and both are given the title of champions. With their friends and Outworld safe, Raiden's group returns to Earthrealm to celebrate their victory. Unbeknownst to the characters, Quan Chi picks up Shinnok's Amulet from Shao Kahn's remains and manically laughs, concluding the story.

== Development ==
A spin-off game starring Liu Kang was originally supposed to be developed shortly after Mortal Kombat: Special Forces, the previous action-adventure title in the series in 2000. However, this did not happen because of the departure of John Tobias and the very negative reception of Special Forces. In October 2004, the president of Midway Games, David F. Zucker, called the release of Shaolin Monks the "first step toward delivering something that Mortal Kombat fans have been calling for: a new game set in the Mortal Kombat universe every year."

Producer Shaun Himmerick stated that the team wanted to make a Mortal Kombat with a "deeper story." The team was fans of adventure games and decided to follow that direction. Mortal Kombat co-creator Ed Boon served as the creative director for Shaolin Monks and worked with the team's programmers to build the fighting engine. The team found a challenge in combining action elements with their multi-directional fighting engine, in an effort to avoid turning the game into a "button smasher". Their idea was to give the player more freedom to execute multiple moves simultaneously than in any other adventure game. They would be able to attack in any direction they wanted. The team added multiple Mortal Kombat elements to make the game more appealing.

Since Mortal Kombat II was Ed Boon's favorite game in the series, the story of this spin-off was based on it. There was also a desire to include both Liu Kang and Kung Lao as protagonists, with the latter having been introduced in Mortal Kombat II. The game's versus mode originated from a bug that allowed testers to face each other. Unlike most Mortal Kombat games, the versus mode was made to include adventure game elements. The engine is different from the one from Mortal Kombat Deception and was made to rival other adventure games. The co-op mode was designed so that players could work together to perform new moves and discover content that a single player could not. Originally, it was planned to allow more than two players in the co-op mode. While Dan Forden was the audio director, Jamie Christopherson worked as the composer.

== Reception ==
Reception

Aggregate score
Aggregator	Score
GameRankings	Xbox: 80.64% (42 reviews); PS2: 79.10% (47 reviews)

Review scores
Publication	Score
1Up.com	B+
GameSpot	7.5/10.0
IGN	8/10
TeamXbox	8.7/10
X-Play	3/5

Mortal Kombat: Shaolin Monks has sold over one million copies and received mostly favorable reviews. At GameRankings, it holds an average of 79.10% and 80.64% for the PlayStation 2 and Xbox consoles respectively. The game was praised by critics for translating the franchise into an entertaining action game. The gameplay was noted for having the same movements from the classic Mortal Kombat games such as the Fatalities and the way combos are handled compared to God of War. 1UP.com was conflicted with game's difficulty as the A.I. can be too strong but might force the player to use more creative moves. On the other hand, GameZone felt the boss fights to be more enjoyable due to the tactics needed to defeat them. The cooperative mode was distinguished for giving the players access to hidden bonuses but at the same time was criticized for being impossible to continue playing in a single-player mode. It was one of the five games nominated by GameSpot for the title of "Most Surprisingly Good Game of 2005". XPlay praised the large amount of combos and finishing moves the player can perform and recommended the audience to use the co-op mode for further enjoyment of the game. TeamXbox agreed as the performance of combos can be further enjoyed when the players are using the two characters. It was the winner of the Satellite Award for Best Action/Adventure Game of 2005.

In regards to the narrative and presentation, IGN felt the characters' voice acting was too forced, especially pointing out Liu Kang and Raiden's voice actors. GameZone claimed the worlds were appealing most notably the Pit stage. TeamXbox found that the story of the game was enjoyable despite negative feedback provided to other Mortal Kombat narratives. GameSpot criticized the game's reliance of backtracking and stated, while the story mode starts entertaining, by the time of the climax it becomes "fairly incomprehensible" as an overuse of plot twist focused on betrayals that are not explained properly. WorthPlaying commented the plot of Shaolin Monks relies more the on the nostalgia factor in contrast to their previous game, Deception, as fan-favorite characters like Johnny Cage and Raiden often appear in the game to assist the main characters.

=== Controversy ===
An advertisement for Shaolin Monks titled "Blood on the Carpet", created by the London-based Maverick Media, was condemned by the Advertising Standards Authority as condoning and glorifying violence. The commercial features a boardroom scene in which Mr. Linn, the mysterious trouble-shooter at a sales meeting, instructs two men to fight. Punches lead to a pen being stabbed into an arm; then a water jug is smashed over an executive's head – before his heart is ripped from his chest. Mr. Linn concludes proceedings by decapitating another executive with his hat. The result of the complaint was, as quoted from the ASA report, "We told Midway not to repeat the approach and told them to consult CAP Copy Advice before producing future ads."

== Legacy ==
A sequel focused on Scorpion and Sub-Zero, titled Mortal Kombat: Fire & Ice, was planned to be developed by Paradox, but financial constraint caused the project's cancellation. Ed Boon recalled: "Monks was FAR and away the best spinoff. We were in talks to do a sequel before the Moorpark studio closed."

A possible HD remake of Mortal Kombat: Shaolin Monks was teased by Boon in October 2013. He also previously said they would "love to make one" someday, but a remake would not come "in the NEAR future" (from January 2013). In 2014, he also disclosed that they already did talk "about doing an up-rez'ed version for [the] PS3 and 360 a few years ago."
