= Kano (Mortal Kombat) =

Fictional character

- Mortal Kombat character
- Kano in Mortal Kombat 1 (2023)
- First appearance: Mortal Kombat (1992)
- Created by: Ed Boon and John Tobias
- Voiced by: List: David Bennett Allen (MK:SF, MK:SM); Michael McConnohie (MKvsDCU, MK2011, MKX); JB Blanc (MK11, MK1); Brian Kesinger (Wreck-It Ralph); Robin Atkin Downes (MKL:SR); David Wenham (MKL:SB)
- Portrayed by: List: Trevor Goddard (1995 film); Darren Shahlavi (web series); Josh Lawson (2020s films)
- Motion capture: Richard Divizio (MK, MK3)

Kano (/ˈkeɪnoʊ/ KAY-noh) is a character from the Mortal Kombat fighting game series, created by Midway Games and later developed by NetherRealm Studios under Warner Bros. Games. Introduced in Mortal Kombat (1992) as a player character and the leader of the fictional Black Dragon crime organization, Kano is characterized by his cybernetic eye, in addition to knives, serving as his primary weapon. In the series, Kano is the main adversary of Special Forces officer Sonya Blade.

Kano has been featured in several sequels of the first game, appearing in ten major titles overall (excluding Mortal Kombat 4 and Mortal Kombat: Deception). He also appears in the series' spin-offs and various media beyond the games, including live-action adaptations, animations, and comics. Outside of the Mortal Kombat series, his likeness is present in the 2005 stop-motion television series Robot Chicken and the 2012 animated film Wreck-It Ralph. Kano has received a generally positive reception among critics who have acknowledged him for his personality, mannerisms, representation of the Australian heritage, and portrayals by Trevor Goddard in the 1995 film and Josh Lawson in the 2021 film.

== Development and design ==
Arnold Schwarzenegger's Terminator (left) had a major impact on the conception of Kano's design, particularly his cybernetic facial structure, which can be observed in his Mortal Kombat 9 face model, as shown on the right side

Kano's original design featured a helmet with red eyes, later revised to include a metal plate on his right eye based on Schwarzenegger's Terminator. In Mortal Kombat (1992), Richard Divizio was invited by one of the series' co-creators, John Tobias, to perform motion capture for Kano. Divizio worked alongside other motion capture artists in a makeshift studio, collaborating with the development team to animate his movements for the game. While developing Kano's Fatality, Divizio initially proposed ripping out a heart, biting it, and raising it in the air. This idea was rejected by the team, leading him to suggest an alternative inspired by the Indiana Jones film series. He modified the concept by removing the biting and adding heartbeats for realism, which the team agreed to finalize. Kano was unplayable from the next game, Mortal Kombat II (1993), due to the lack of popularity among players, in addition to the shortage of game storage. Divizio reprised his motion capture role in Mortal Kombat 3 (1995). Kano's absence in Mortal Kombat 4 (1997) and Mortal Kombat: Deception (2004) led to the creation of two substitutes: Jarek and Kira.

Kano leads the Black Dragon crime syndicate and utilizes his cybernetic laser eye and knives as primary tools for combat. Originally represented as a Japanese-born American, his nationality was retconned to Australian in Mortal Kombat vs. DC Universe (2008), influenced by Trevor Goddard's Cockney English accent but misinterpreted as an Australian accent in the 1995 Mortal Kombat film. Kano conceals the injured side of his face with a metal plate, an injury attributed to fellow character Jax. For the first live-action adaptation, American filmmaker Lawrence Kasanoff cited Schwarzenegger's Terminator as an influence for redesigning Kano. However, during a set visit by school children, one child became upset at the redesign and insisted that Kano retain his uniqueness. Recognizing the audience's attachment to the character, Kasanoff's team reinstated Kano's appearance. In the 2011 web series Mortal Kombat: Legacy, English actor Darren Shahlavi played Kano. In Mortal Kombat X (2015), Kano's enhancements expanded beyond his cybernetic eye to include a cybernetic heart. Kano was redesigned for the 2022 animated film Mortal Kombat Legends: Snow Blind, featuring a mohawk hairstyle, a white beard, and the title "King Kano".

For the 2021 Mortal Kombat reboot film, Australian actor Josh Lawson portrayed Kano, with director Simon McQuoid balancing his comic relief role with the film's serious tone. McQuoid explained that Kano, along with the original character Cole Young, served as an entry point to explain the franchise's supernatural lore to the audience. Lawson described his interpretation of Kano as both immature and passionate, mixing his violent nature with humor, mentioning his catchphrase "Kano wins!" that was improvised during filming. Lawson ensured Kano's personality remained faithful to his original characterization. Before Lawson's casting, another Australian actor, Joel Edgerton, was strongly considered by filmmaker James Wan to portray Kano. Kano's usual physical appearance has also been modified in this film: he lacks the metallic mask to cover his cybernetic eye, instead having scars around it, and he is depicted in less revealing attire. Lawson reprised the role for the sequel Mortal Kombat II (2026), revealing that Kano experiences crucial character development shaped by his death in the prequel, marking a turning point that leads to "Kano 2.0" with altered motivations.

== Fictional character biography ==
Kano is a recurring character in the Mortal Kombat series, known for his affiliation with the Black Dragon clan, mercenary work, and shifting allegiances. Introduced in Mortal Kombat (1992), he was pursued by United States Special Forces operative Sonya Blade, leading to their long-standing rivalry. After the first tournament, Kano was taken to a place known as Outworld, where he aligned himself with Emperor Shao Kahn and guided him with knowledge of weaponry. His involvement in Outworld's conflicts continued, including a brief occupancy as Shao's general and later service under the Deadly Alliance of sorcerers Shang Tsung and Quan Chi.

Kano frequently switched sides for personal gain, working for figures like Shao and the Deadly Alliance while clashing with Sonya and the Special Forces. During Mortal Kombat X (2015), he facilitated the sale of Elder God Shinnok's amulet and later tried to assassinate Shao's general Kotal Kahn, reinforcing his role in Outworld's conflicts. However, his rivalry with Sonya remained central, leading to several confrontations. In Mortal Kombat 11 (2019), a timeline alteration caused the past and present selves of Kano to appear simultaneously, allowing them to interact. Kano's cybernetic enhancements, including his laser eye, and his adaptability have kept him a notable presence in the series. His self-serving nature makes him a complex character within Mortal Kombat lore.

== Appearances ==
Kano's main appearances in the Mortal Kombat series span several installments, including the original Mortal Kombat, Mortal Kombat 3 (and its updates), Mortal Kombat: Deadly Alliance, Mortal Kombat: Armageddon, Mortal Kombat vs. DC Universe, Mortal Kombat 9, Mortal Kombat X (and its accompanying comics), and Mortal Kombat 11. Across these games, his storyline frequently revolves around his rivalry with Sonya Blade. Kano also appears as a background character in Mortal Kombat II, as an opponent in Batman: Arkham City Lockdown, and as an assist character with the term "Kameo Fighter" in Mortal Kombat 1.

His appearances in the series' spin-offs include Mortal Kombat: Special Forces, Mortal Kombat: Shaolin Monks, Mortal Kombat Mobile, and Mortal Kombat: Onslaught. Besides video games, he has appeared in live-action productions: the 1995 film, Mortal Kombat: Legacy, the 2021 film, and the 2026 film; and in animations: Mortal Kombat: Defenders of the Realm, Robot Chicken, Wreck-It Ralph, Mortal Kombat Legends: Scorpion's Revenge, and Mortal Kombat Legends: Snow Blind.

== Critical reception ==
Edmond Tran from GameSpot published an article discussing Kano's influence on Australia. In the article, Tran initially criticizes Kano as the sole overt villain in the original Mortal Kombat (1992), showcasing moves like his knife projectile and cannonball roll. Despite his distinctive appearance (white gi, bandolier, and metallic faceplate), Kano was considered less engaging compared to other characters, such as the ninjas or those with magical abilities. Tran referenced Kano's history, originally conceived with a Japanese-American background and later changed to Australian, inspired by Trevor Goddard's Cockney portrayal in the 1995 film. While this change added some impact, Tran argued it did not necessarily make Kano a more compelling character. However, Tran expressed satisfaction with Kano's Australian representation and redesign in Mortal Kombat 11 (2019), examining several of his characteristics: skills in using knives, sense of humor, urinary habits, beer drinking, criminal behavior, clothing style, attitude, dialogues, and gameplay moves.

Professors Edward Elliot and Jessica Isserow displayed Kano and Sonya in a case study for "Moral Kombat: Analytic Naturalism and Moral Disagreement", examining the nature of moral disagreements through a philosophical conflict between the two characters over gender inequality as an example. In this analysis, Kano is distinguished as sexist for supporting policies that promote gender inequality, directly opposing Sonya's view that such policies are morally wrong. The study further explores multiple instances similar to this and whether their conflict represents a genuine moral debate or a verbal dispute. From the view of moral realism, the professors argue that, as members of the same cultural community, both characters likely share knowledge of the terms involved, suggesting that their disagreement is caused by opposing beliefs and not the lack of communication, showcasing the complexity of moral disputes.

Gavin Jasper of Den of Geek discussed Kano and his connections to other Mortal Kombat characters, including Jarek, Hsu Hao, and Kira. Jasper noted that Jarek, who replaced Kano in Mortal Kombat 4 (1997), lacked the distinctive qualities that made Kano notable. In contrast, Jasper considered Hsu Hao and Kira similar to Kano, with Hsu Hao becoming irrelevant in Mortal Kombat X (2015). Kira, however, was viewed as a fusion of Kano's and Sonya's gameplay properties. Jasper classified Kano as the series' "bullseye" and "cockroach", emphasizing his selfishness in betraying humanity for power, survival, or amusement. He also praised Goddard's portrayal of Kano, which helped make the character stand out. Kano's portrayal by Josh Lawson in the 2021 film generally received positive commentary from the critics, including Screen Rant's Max Ruscinski and Junkee's Molly Hunt.
