= Flexing with Monty =

- Directed by: John Albo
- Written by: John Albo
- Starring: Trevor Goddard; Rudi Davis; Sally Kirkland
- Edited by: Barry Zetlin
- Production company: Dagger Productions
- Distributed by: Unearthed Films; Dagger Productions
- Release date: January 5, 2010
- Running time: 89 min
- Country: United States
- Language: English

Flexing with Monty is a 2010 American comedy-drama film starring Trevor Goddard, Rudi Davis and Sally Kirkland. Shooting started in 1994 and was finally completed in 2008 during which both the film's male lead (Trevor Goddard), and the original producer died.

== Plot ==
Monty, a physical education instructor at a local university, lives with his teenage brother, Bertin, whom he has raised alone. Monty is obsessed with body building and he compulsively works out every day. Lilith, a mysterious woman, enters the brothers' lives and she pits Monty against Bertin, forcing the two brothers into conflict.

== Cast ==
- Trevor Goddard as Monty
- Rudi Davis as Bertin
- Sally Kirkland as Lillith
- Mitch Hara as a gay man
- Michelle Zeitlin as a hooker
- Manny Gates as the caged man
- Gwen Van Dam as Granny
