= Shao Kahn =

Mortal Kombat character

- Mortal Kombat character
- Shao Kahn artwork by John Tobias for Mortal Kombat 3 (1995)
- First game: Mortal Kombat II (1993)
- Created by: Ed Boon; John Tobias
- Designed by: John Tobias
- Voiced by: Various: Steve Ritchie (1993–2005); Frank Welker (1995 film); Michael Des Barres (animated series); Nigel Casey (2004–2006); Patrick Seitz (MKvsDC); Bob Carter (MK9); Ike Amadi (2019–present); Fred Tatasciore (animated films)
- Portrayed by: Various: Brian Thompson (film); Jeffrey Meek (television); Aleks Paunovic (web series); Martyn Ford (Mortal Kombat II)
- Motion capture: Brian Glynn (MKII, MK3, UMK3, MKT, MKA); Jordan Brun (MKvs.DCU); Stephan Scalabrino (MK11)

In-universe information
- Weapon: War hammer

Shao Kahn is a character and one of the main antagonists of the Mortal Kombat fighting game franchise by Midway Games and NetherRealm Studios. He is depicted as the emperor of the fictional realm Outworld. Feared for his immense strength, which he complements with a large hammer and knowledge of black magic, Shao Kahn seeks to conquer all of the realms, including Earth. He serves as the main antagonist of Mortal Kombat II (1993), Mortal Kombat 3 (1995) and its updates, and the 2011 reboot, as well as the action-adventure spin-off Mortal Kombat: Shaolin Monks (2005). An amalgam of Shao Kahn and DC Comics villain Darkseid also appears as the main antagonist and final boss of Mortal Kombat vs. DC Universe (2008) under the name Dark Kahn. A younger persona known as General Shao appears in Mortal Kombat 1 (2023).

Shao Kahn is one of the most celebrated villains in video games. Noted as a difficult boss, he has received praise for his design, in-game abilities, and mannerisms, particularly his mocking and taunting of players. The character has appeared in various media outside of the games, including as the main villain of the film Mortal Kombat Annihilation (1997) and Mortal Kombat II (2026).

== Character design and gameplay ==
An unmasked Shao Kahn in the Mortal Kombat II comic book by John Tobias

Shao Kahn was inspired by the Star Wars villain, Darth Vader, where the audience knew that there was an emperor ruling the universe, but knew nothing else about him, creating a desire in the viewer to want to know more. Tobias had something very similar with Shang Tsung and Shao Kahn, and for him that came from the feeling he had as a child when he learned more about what made the Star Wars universe tick in Empire Strikes Back. Tobias wanted gamers to have that same feeling. Kahn's attire for Mortal Kombat II was developed by Mark Runion. Kahn started out unmasked and with large gnashing teeth similar to Baraka, since everyone from Outworld was originally supposed to be of Baraka's race. The idea of all inhabitants of Outworld being Tarkatan was later dropped. His identity has only appeared in Shaolin Monks and Mortal Kombat 11; with the latter revealing an inhuman, but not monstrous, face.

In MKII, Kahn was digitally resized to a taller height to make him tower over the playable characters, and was played by actor and bodybuilder Brian Glynn. Glynn considered Shao Kahn as a positive experience, recalling his time with John Parish (Jax) who recommended him for the role Kahn. During the audition, artist John Tobias requested him to expose his chest which resulted in his quick inclusion in the game as the actor did not have to perform martial arts. Glynn's portrayal of Kahn was popular with the Midway staff to the point they requested his help with other projects. In many official depictions of Shao Kahn made by Midway, he is shown wearing a cape, though he never wore one in his original digitized appearances. Mortal Kombat: Deception was the first time in which he wore the cape in-game. Mortal Kombat sound designer Dan Forden explained that the reason for Kahn not wearing the cape in earlier games, in addition to Kabal not being able to wear a trenchcoat in Mortal Kombat 3, was that loose flowing clothing took up memory.

Shao Kahn originated as an unplayable boss character in MKII. He is fought as a boss (in most cases, the final boss) in most of his appearances, but became a player character for the first time in the home ports of MK3 as an unlockable character. He would also be playable in the home ports of Ultimate Mortal Kombat 3, Mortal Kombat Trilogy, the GameCube and PlayStation Portable versions of Mortal Kombat: Deception, Mortal Kombat: Armageddon and Mortal Kombat vs. DC Universe. Shao Kahn also appears as a playable character in Mortal Kombat 11 via DLC. In Mortal Kombat (2011), Shao Kahn is once again a non-playable boss. He is also the final boss in the beat 'em up spin-off, Shaolin Monks.

Shao Kahn's special moves consist mainly of powerful shoulder barges, magical projectiles, and attacks with his signature giant maul, the "Wrath Hammer". In some of his appearances as a boss, blocking Kahn's attacks will stun the player. Since his debut, his signature tactic has been taunting players before, during, and after rounds with such statements as "Bow to me!", "Feel the power of Shao Kahn!", and "It's official, you suck!"

== Appearances ==
=== Mortal Kombat games ===
Shao Kahn first appears as the final boss of Mortal Kombat II and Mortal Kombat 3. In the former, he invokes a rematch against Earthrealm and faces them in Mortal Kombat to facilitate an invasion of Earthrealm, only to be defeated and foiled by Liu Kang. In the latter game, Shang Tsung resurrects Queen Sindel so Shao can use her to mount another invasion of Earthrealm. Ignoring the Mortal Kombat's rules, Shao steals billions of souls from Earthrealm to empower himself and merge it with Outworld as well as sends extermination squads to kill Raiden's chosen warriors, only to be defeated by Liu Kang once more.

Shao makes a cameo appearance in Mortal Kombat: Deadly Alliance, in which he is seemingly killed by the titular Deadly Alliance. In Mortal Kombat: Deception, in which he appears as a playable character in the GameCube version, it is revealed the Deadly Alliance killed a decoy while the real Shao set out to reclaim his empire from Onaga. In Mortal Kombat: Armageddon, in which he also appears as a playable character, he succeeded in defeating Onaga before forming a fragile alliance with him and the Deadly Alliance to defeat Blaze and seize his godlike power.

Shao Kahn appears as the final boss of Mortal Kombat (2011). After successfully obtaining Blaze's power, he attempts to kill Raiden until the latter sends a message back to his past self to avert the events of Armageddon. In the subsequently altered timeline, when Shao mounts his invasion of Earthrealm while ignoring Mortal Kombat's rules, the enraged Elder Gods empower Raiden, allowing him to kill Shao.

A past version of Shao appears as a playable character in Mortal Kombat 11 (MK11). After being brought to the present by Kronika and promised a timeline without Raiden, he agrees to work for her. Amidst this, he attempts to retake his throne from Kotal Kahn and rebuild Outworld's forces until he is defeated by Kitana. In the DLC storyline expansion Aftermath, Shang Tsung reunites Shao and Sindel to help him steal Kronika's Crown of Souls. The tyrants betray Earthrealm and Outworld's forces and assist Shang Tsung in assaulting Kronika's keep until they are betrayed in turn by him.

A new incarnation of Shao named General Shao appears as a playable character in Mortal Kombat 1 (MK1). After Fire God Liu Kang creates a second new timeline, Shao was born a sickly child into a proud military family before his father molded him into the perfect soldier. By the present, Shao became commander of Outworld's armies and a staunch Outworld patriot. Believing Outworld should conquer Earthrealm, he openly disagrees with Empress Sindel's policies, but makes no move against her until Shang Tsung and Quan Chi help him mount a rebellion against her, only to be foiled by her and Liu Kang. Following this, Shao is arrested and replaced by Kitana, though he later escapes prison and rallies followers to help him rebel against Outworld's royalty and tame Onaga for use in his plans.

=== Other media ===
Shao Kahn appears in the Mortal Kombat comic book miniseries Blood & Thunder and Battlewave. In the latter, he kidnaps Sonya Blade and brainwashes her into marrying him to weaken the barrier between Outworld and Earthrealm so he can easily seize the latter.

Shao Kahn, referred to simply as the "Emperor", makes a cameo appearance in Mortal Kombat (1995) via special effects, voiced by Frank Welker. Shao would later appear in Mortal Kombat Annihilation, portrayed by Brian Thompson. For this appearance, he is depicted as Raiden's brother and son of Shinnok.

Shao Kahn appears in Mortal Kombat: Live Tour, played by Jeffrey D. Harris and Ted Nordblum.

Shao Kahn received an action figure from Toy Island as part of their Mortal Kombat Trilogy series.

Shao Kahn appears in the Mortal Kombat Kard Game.

Shao Kahn appears in Mortal Kombat: Conquest, portrayed by Jeffrey Meek. For this appearance, he serves as the mediator of the Mortal Kombat tournaments.

Shao Kahn appears in Mortal Kombat: Defenders of the Realm, voiced by John Vernon.

Shao Kahn appears as a playable character in Mortal Kombat vs. DC Universe. After Raiden and Superman inadvertently fuse Shao Kahn and Darkseid into Dark Kahn, the former pair unite warriors from their respective dimensions to stop and separate them, with Shao being trapped in Superman's universe and imprisoned in the Phantom Zone.

Shao Kahn appears in the Mortal Kombat: Legacy two-part episode "Kitana & Mileena", portrayed by Aleks Paunovic. This version truly loved Sindel and Kitana and created Mileena to have someone who would reciprocate his feelings.

Shao Kahn appears in Mortal Kombat Legends: Scorpion's Revenge and Mortal Kombat Legends: Battle of the Realms, voiced by Fred Tatasciore.

Shao Kahn appears in Mortal Kombat II, portrayed by Martyn Ford.

== Reception ==
Shao Kahn was nominated in Nintendo Power Awards '94 and '95 in the category "Worst Villain" (actually honoring the top video-game villains) of the year, coming second place in 1995, behind King K. Rool. GamesRadar praised Shao Kahn's role as an antagonist, putting him in their 2013 list of the best villains in video game history at number 24, and including him among the 12 most unfair gaming bosses in 2014. Guinness World Records Gamer's Edition listed Shao Kahn as 41st in their list of "top 50 video game villains". Complex ranked Shao Kahn from Mortal Kombat II as the "coolest" boss in fighting game history in 2012, stating that "in the history of fighting games, no boss has ever been cooler or more exciting to lose against." The GamesRadar staff described Shao Kahn as the best villain in video games, stating that "There are plenty of bad guys in the Mortal Kombat games, but the Emperor of Outworld, Shao Kahn, takes the wickedness cake."

In UGO's 2012 list of the top Mortal Kombat characters, Shao Kahn placed sixteenth. In their retrospection listing of MK characters, UGO stated most favorite thing about him was the fact that "his speaking voice is the voice of the announcer heard throughout the series." Complex placed him seventh on her 2013 list of most brutal fighters in Mortal Kombat, adding that "he was brutal not only in his strength but his cunning, too." On the other hand, GamesRadar felt that Shao Kahn was more anticlimactic when compared to the subboss Kintaro as he viewed Kintaro as a more menacing character in contrast to the Emperor who was compared with He-Man in a negative fashion in terms of design. When a mask of Shao Kahn was made for sale, Game Informer noticed that it was one of the few times people had the chance to see boss' true face, comparing him to a Star Trek alien.

Game Informer featured him on their list of gaming's "crappiest" fathers, commenting he due to his misbehaviour with his wife Sindel and his adopted daughter Kitana. The character's incarnation in the 2011 Mortal Kombat has been criticized for how hard it is to defeat him to the point of frustrating gamers; that same year, CraveOnline included him on the list of top five "bosses you want to kill but can't". The fight against Shao Kahn in Mortal Kombat 3 was also noted for its difficulty; in 2013, Complex ranked it as the 23rd hardest boss battle in video games. Kahn's portrayal in Mortal Kombat 11 was the subject of controversy for him referencing President Donald Trump and his slogan but under the name "Make Outworld Great Again".

VentureBeat found Shao Kahn highly difficult to defeat in most of his appearances, resulting in the need for the player to come up with strategies need to kill the boss. The New York Times panned Shao Kahn's characterization alongside his army from Mortal Kombat Annihilation for making "Saddam Hussein look like Mr. Rogers". Den of Geek was confused by the lack of promotion for Shao Kahn in the film reboot as teases said that Shang Tsung was the actual Outworld Emperor instead, leading to speculations that both characters were combined to for one single antagonist in the film.
