= Revolution X =

1994 video game

- North American arcade flyer
- Developer: Midway (Note: Ports developed by Rage Software.)
- Publishers: Midway; Ports; Acclaim Entertainment
- Designers: George Petro; Jack Haeger
- Composers: Chris Granner; Vince Pontarelli; Aerosmith
- Platforms: Arcade, Genesis/Mega Drive, MS-DOS, PlayStation, Sega Saturn, Super NES
- Release: March 1994: Arcade; NA: March 1994 Genesis/Mega Drive, Super NES, NA: December 1995; EU: 1995 PlayStation, Saturn; NA: December 1995; EU: March 29, 1996 MS-DOS; NA: 1996
- Genres: Shooting gallery, rail shooter
- Modes: Single-player, multiplayer
- Arcade system: Midway X Unit

Revolution X is a 1994 shooting gallery video game developed and published by Midway for arcades. It was later ported to the Sega Genesis, Sega Saturn, Super NES, and PlayStation in 1995, followed by a MS-DOS version the following year. The gameplay is similar to Midway's earlier Terminator 2: Judgment Day, but is themed around the band Aerosmith. The oppressive New Order Nation regime and their leader Helga have abducted Aerosmith, and players use a mounted light gun to shoot enemies. The members of Aerosmith are hidden throughout the game's international locales and must be found in order to receive the game's true ending.

The arcade game was a critical and commercial success, but all of the ports were negatively received.

== Plot ==
In a dystopian version of 1996, an alliance of corrupt government and corporate military forces have taken control of the world in the guise of the "New Order Nation" (NON). The NON, with their vampish commander Head Mistress Helga (portrayed by Kerri Hoskins), have declared war on youth culture (anyone aged from 13 to 30) and have banned all forms of music, television, magazines, and video games. The player travels to "Club X" in Los Angeles to see Aerosmith perform live, but the band is captured by NON troops and hustled off the stage in the middle of their show. After escaping from the club, the player steals a helicopter and flies across the city to find the band's car. From here, the player must destroy three NON installations in the Middle East, Amazon Jungle, and Pacific Rim, then travel to London to defeat Helga and her remaining forces at Wembley Stadium.

== Gameplay ==
Controls consist of a mounted machine gun with unlimited ammunition, which fires as long as the trigger is held down, and a button on the side that fires one CD per press.

Revolution X is a rail shooter in which the players must shoot targets including NON soldiers and vehicles, with the ultimate goals of destroying the NON and rescuing the members of Aerosmith. Players start the game at Club X in Los Angeles, first fighting the NON troops inside and then stealing a helicopter to fly across the city and find Aerosmith's car. They must then destroy three NON facilities in the Amazon jungle, the Middle East and the Pacific Rim. These three stages may be played in any order; however, failing to complete the Middle East stage within a set time limit will send the players back to its start for another attempt. Finally, the players advance to Wembley Stadium for the final battle with the surviving NON forces and Head Mistress Helga. Throughout the game, crates and background objects can be shot to reveal power-ups like health-replenishing shakes, CDs, powerful laserdiscs and Super Guns, shields, and Skull Bombs that destroy every enemy on the screen. Players can also find hostages and free them throughout the game for extra points.

At the end of each stage, the players receive bonus points based on the number of enemies killed and hostages rescued, as well as the amount of damage done. The five members of Aerosmith are hidden in secret locations throughout the game. When found, each member presents the player with a set of Aerosmith wings that increase the end-of-stage bonus. All members must be found in order to unlock the best ending and bonus level, in which the players go backstage after blowing up Helga, and can collect high-value Mammy Awards, as well as party with the band.

== Development and release ==
Revolution X originated as a shooting game based on the rebellious nature of and importance of music in 1990s Generation X culture. Hip hop group Public Enemy was approached to be featured in the game, and the game was to be titled Generation X. The title was scrapped after Marvel Comics sent a cease and desist letter to Midway, warning them that the title used the same name as a Marvel comic. Public Enemy declined to be featured in the game, citing the controversy surrounding the graphic depictions of violence in Midway's previous game Mortal Kombat.

Midway digitized performances of Aerosmith to be used in the game using the same digitization technology used for their previous arcade titles. Joey Kramer was digitized without a physical drum set - he would air drum his playing along with a song playback, with the "physical" drums added in later by the designers.

Mortal Kombat II features an advertisement with the old Revolution X logo that arcade operators could toggle on and off. Occasionally after a large in-game explosion, Steven Tyler can be heard saying "Toasty!" in a high-pitched voice in reference to an easter egg in Mortal Kombat II. The game was originally developed as a title based on the film Jurassic Park. However, Sega acquired the rights instead and eventually released its own arcade game based on the film. Midway then retooled its concept to revolve around Aerosmith.

The first release labeled Proto 5.0 (5/23/1994) is lacking several speech samples spoken by members of Aerosmith which can be heard after collecting power-ups and has a shorter Pacific Rim level. Revision 1.0 (6/16/1994) restored the missing speech samples and has the complete Pacific Rim level and completed two new crosshairs in P2 and P3 as well as the ability to toggle the CD Offer screen on and off by the operator. Revolution X was released as upright two player and deluxe three player arcade units and as a conversion kit for existing gun games such as Terminator 2: The Arcade Game.

== Soundtrack ==
The soundtrack consists of several Aerosmith songs continuously looped, including "Eat the Rich", "Sweet Emotion", "Toys in the Attic", and "Walk This Way". A Muzak version of "Love in an Elevator" plays in the elevator part of the Amazon Jungle level. The soundtrack was featured in the CD Offer after playing or during attract mode.

The console versions include loops of "Rag Doll" for the attract screen, main menu, and score, "Fever" for the Middle East level, and "Dude (Looks Like a Lady)" for the ending.

== Ports ==
The game was later ported by Rage Software, and released by Acclaim for MS-DOS computers, the Super Nintendo Entertainment System, Mega Drive, PlayStation, and Saturn. A 32X version was demonstrated at E3 1995, and a Jaguar conversion was slated to be published around the fourth quarter of 1995, but neither was released.

== Reception ==
Reception

Review scores
| Publication | Score |
|---|---|
| AllGame | 4.5/5 (ARC); 2.5/5 (SNES) |
| Electronic Gaming Monthly | 4.875/10 (SNES) |
| Famitsu | 4/10, 3/10, 5/10, 6/10 (SAT) |
| Hyper | 62/100 (SNES) |
| IGN | 1/10 (PS) |
| Next Generation | 1/5 (GEN, SNES, PS, SAT) |
| PlayStation: The Official Magazine | 2/10 (PS) |
| Sega Saturn Magazine | 44% (SAT) |

In North America, RePlay reported Revolution X to be the fifth most popular upright arcade game at the time. Play Meter also listed the game to be the second most popular arcade game at the time. GamePro gave the arcade version a rave review, praising the ability to choose from multiple paths, the numerous secret items, the sharp graphics, and the Aerosmith soundtrack. They concluded, "Rev X is not a revolution in gun games, but it's definitely the best one yet." In a retrospective review, Allgame said it "can be quite a bit of fun", citing the tongue-in-cheek silliness and the ability to choose one's path at certain junctures.

The home versions of the game, however, were thoroughly condemned by critics. The four reviewers of Electronic Gaming Monthly praised the digitized voices and music of the SNES version, with two of them going so far as to say they were the best they'd heard on any 16-bit console, but nonetheless concluded it to be an inexcusably poor conversion. They particularly noted the absence of many graphical details from the arcade version and the awkward, sluggish movement of the control cursor. GamePro's The Axe Grinder also criticized the graphics and controls, remarking that "Moving your target sight is a breeze, but accurately pinpointing small targets is difficult." He disagreed with EGM on the audio, describing the music as dull and the sound effects as infrequent and muted. In the same issue, Air Hendrix found the same targeting problems in the Genesis version, and said it "desperately needs" light gun support. He also found the graphics to be grainy and choppy and the sounds to be static-ridden. Reviewers for Next Generation ridiculed the "laughable graphics, indistinguishable digitized voices, and awful music", and added that the game is overly repetitive and simply not fun.

Scary Larry of GamePro panned the PlayStation version. Citing prominent slowdown, mediocre graphics, and a bland soundtrack, he assessed that "With standard shooting that doesn't live up to its arcade counterpart, Rev X seems like an old game wheezing through on its past reputation". Next Generation commented, "This shooter ... was popular in the arcades, but this conversion is abysmal." IGN gave the PlayStation version a 1 out of 10. They complained of slow controls and poor graphics and concluded that "Revolution X isn't the worst game ever made, but it sure comes close."

Echoing Scary Larry's assessment of the PlayStation version, GamePro's Bruised Lee commented that "Acclaim took Midway's smash arcade hit and turned it into a complete miss for the Saturn." He complained of blocky graphics, dull backgrounds, repetitive gameplay, extreme slowdown, and poor sound effects. Sega Saturn Magazine summarized it as "An incredibly bland and monotonous game matched only by the blandness and monotony of the band that endorse it", citing overlong boss fights and a lack of intelligent design to where the enemies appear.

Electronic Gaming Monthly's Seanbaby placed the Super NES version as number 10 in his "20 worst games of all time" feature.

Conversely, Spanish magazine Superjuegos gave the SNES version 91, regarding the scaling as one of the best in 16 bits, and the soundtrack as one of the best in the console. The magazine was also complimentary to the PlayStation and Sega Saturn versions, giving both a score of 92, regarding the scaling as the best seen on a console.

== See also ==
- Journey (1983 video game)
