= John Tobias =

Co-creator of Mortal Kombat

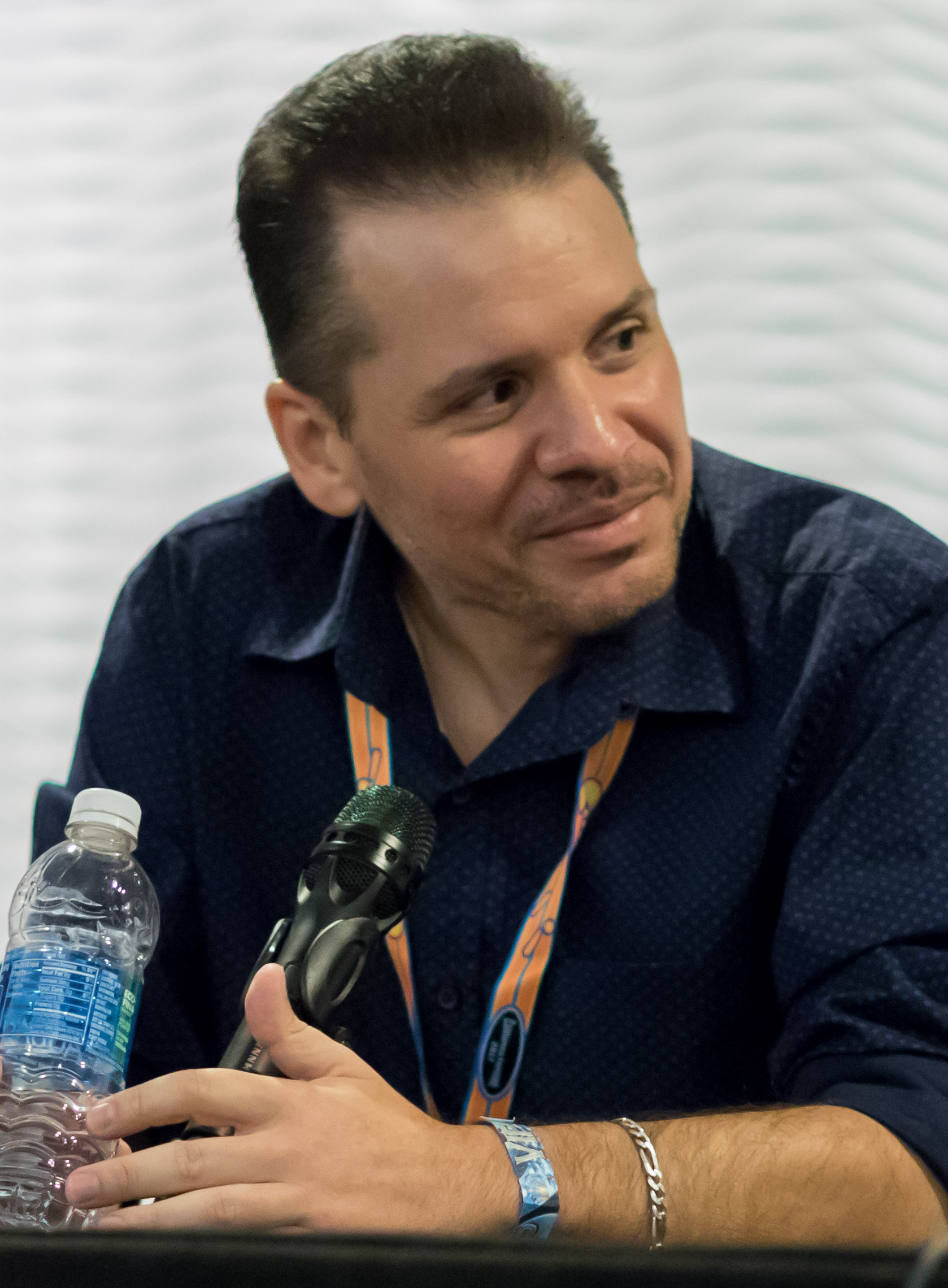
- Tobias in 2017
- Born: August 24, 1969 (age 57); Chicago, Illinois, U.S.
- Occupations: Comic book artist; Graphic designer; Video game designer; Writer
- Years active: 1988–present
- Known for: Mortal Kombat franchise

John Tobias (born August 24, 1969) is an American comic book artist, graphic designer, video game designer, and writer. Tobias is best known for co-creating the Mortal Kombat series along with Ed Boon, to whom he pitched the game concept.

Tobias became interested in drawing from an early age, inspired by comic books. During high school he took weekend courses at the Art Institute of Chicago. He was an artist for The Real Ghostbusters comic book series before joining Midway Games. Tobias said his original career plan was to be a comic book artist, but the advances in graphics at the time made the video game industry more appealing to him, as well as his mother frequently stating that artists would never support their families. He worked on the original arcade version of Smash TV (1990) prior to the success of Mortal Kombat in 1992. Tobias created the early Mortal Kombat series' storyline, themes, and settings; including the Outworld and Netherrealm. He was also responsible for the design of the entire character roster from the early games in the series through Mortal Kombat 4 (1997). This includes the series' most popular characters including Kano, Kitana, Liu Kang, Raiden, Johnny Cage, Scorpion, Sub-Zero, Sonya Blade, and Goro. Noob Saibot was named after Tobias's and Boon's reversed surnames. This is also elaborated in their Twitter handles, @therealsaibot and @noobde.

Tobias, along with other prominent Midway staff members, including Dave Michicich and Josh Tsui, left Midway in 1999 and formed Studio Gigante in 2000. Tao Feng: Fist of the Lotus, published by Microsoft Game Studios in 2003, was the first game Studio Gigante created, followed by WWE WrestleMania 21 in 2005. Studio Gigante ceased operations in 2005 and Tobias worked as a consultant in the games industry until September 2012, when he joined social games studio Zynga.

Despite being one of the original creators of the Mortal Kombat series, Tobias is not mentioned in commentary or descriptions in the "making of" documentaries for Deadly Alliance and Deception, but was referred to as one of "four people who made" the original Mortal Kombat. However, he can be seen in the commentaries for Mortal Kombat 3 in the collection Midway Arcade Treasures 2. In 2008, Tobias illustrated a pack-in comic with special editions of Mortal Kombat vs. DC Universe. Tobias was interviewed at length in episode 5 of the 2020 Netflix documentary miniseries High Score, about Mortal Kombat and the controversies surrounding its release. As part of the Hispanic Heritage Month 2021 Boon tweeted they both are Hispanic.

As of 2026 he is the Creative Director of WB Games.
