= Characters of the Mortal Kombat series =

Sixty of the Mortal Kombat franchise's characters featured in Armageddon (2006)

This is a list of playable and boss characters from the Mortal Kombat fighting game franchise and the games in which they appear. Created by Ed Boon and John Tobias, the series depicts conflicts between various realms. Most characters fight on behalf of their realm, with the primary heroes defending Earthrealm against conquering villains from Outworld and the Netherrealm. Early installments feature the characters participating in the eponymous Mortal Kombat tournament to decide their realm's fate. In later installments, Earthrealm is often invaded by force.

Starting with Mortal Kombat 9, several guest characters have appeared in the franchise, with the characters exclusive to their particular game and not appearing in subsequent entries. These guest characters include:

- Kratos and Freddy Krueger for Mortal Kombat 9
- Jason Voorhees, the Predator, a Xenomorph (called 'Alien'), and Leatherface in Mortal Kombat X
- Spawn, the Terminator, RoboCop, John Rambo, and the Joker in Mortal Kombat 11
- Omni-Man, Peacemaker, Homelander, Ghostface, the T-1000, and Conan the Barbarian in Mortal Kombat 1

== Introduced in Mortal Kombat (1992) ==
=== Goro ===
Portrayed by: Tom Woodruff Jr. (1995 film)
Voiced by: Herman Sanchez (MK4); Ken Lally (2011 game); Vic Chao (MKX, MK1); Kevin Michael Richardson (1995 film, Scorpion's Revenge); Ron Feinberg (The Journey Begins); Angus Sampson (2021 film)

Goro is the sub-boss of the first Mortal Kombat game. He is a Shokan, a half-human, half-dragon race distinguished by his four arms and enormous size. He became Grand Champion of the Mortal Kombat tournament after defeating the Great Kung Lao, and held the title for the next 500 years as part of evil sorcerer Shang Tsung's plan to manipulate the tournament in order to achieve Outworld emperor Shao Kahn's goal of dominance of Earthrealm. However, these plans were thwarted when the Earthrealm warrior Liu Kang defeated both Goro and Shang Tsung, allowing Earthrealm to regain control of the tournament. Goro disappeared thereafter and was believed to be dead. In Mortal Kombat II, Goro is succeeded by another member of his race, Kintaro, and is not seen again until the 1996 compilation game Mortal Kombat Trilogy, in which all the characters from the first three series games were playable. Goro was initially omitted from Mortal Kombat 4 (1997), but was included as a sub-boss in the home versions of the game.

In the training mode of Mortal Kombat: Deadly Alliance (2002), Goro is mortally wounded and presumed dead. In the 2004 follow-up game Mortal Kombat: Deception, he has been saved from death by Shao Kahn, with the promise of returning his fellow Shokan to their former glory and the banishment of their archenemies, the Centaurs, in exchange for his allegiance, and resumes his place at Shao Kahn's side. Goro was not playable in either game. He is a boss character in the 2005 beat 'em up title Mortal Kombat: Shaolin Monks. In the 2011 Mortal Kombat series reboot, Goro resumes his role as the sub-boss of the Shaolin Tournament from the first game, and is again defeated by Liu Kang in the story mode. He is playable in the 2015 title Mortal Kombat X (2015) as a bonus pre-order character, again serving as a sub-boss in the game's arcade-ladder mode. In Mortal Kombat 11 (2019), Goro's corpse appears in the story mode and in his "Lair" stage during gameplay. Goro appears in Mortal Kombat 1 as an assist character, or "Kameo Fighter", and via a minor appearance in the story mode as a member of General Shao's army.

Goro's original design was as a two-armed humanoid character named Rokuro, a member of "a race of demon warriors" who would join the tournament "to restore the pride and respect of his race". Series creators Ed Boon and John Tobias drew design inspiration from the stop motion adventure films of Ray Harryhausen, especially his depiction of Kali in The Golden Voyage of Sinbad in redesigning Goro with four arms. He was originally named "Gongoro" before his final name was determined, and was constructed as a stop-motion clay figurine that eventually fell apart after excessive use in capturing its movements for the game.

Goro has a prominent role in Malibu Comics' Mortal Kombat series that followed the events of the first game, and was the subject of the 1994 three-issue miniseries Goro: Prince of Pain. In the 2015 DC Comics Mortal Kombat X prequel series, he is featured in a subplot that shows him fighting and being maimed by Kotal Kahn in a battle for the Outworld throne. Goro is the reigning champion in the 1995 film Mortal Kombat that follows the events of the original game, and was a life-sized animatronic model that cost over $1 million to construct and required over a dozen puppeteers to operate. Goro again reprised his role as the defending tournament champion in the 2020 animated film Mortal Kombat Legends: Scorpion's Revenge that retold the events of the original game, but was a supporting villain in the 2021 live-action reboot film Mortal Kombat, in which he was computer-generated.

Goro has received positive critical reception for his formidableness as a boss character in the games, but his cinematic portrayals, particularly in the 2021 film, have been negatively received. Michael Kennedy of Screen Rant commented in 2021, "While the puppetry used to bring Goro to life [in the 1995 film] had its limitations, Goro played a vital role in the story, serving as a major roadblock to thunder god Raiden's defense of Earthrealm. While he returned in Mortal Kombat 2021, his inclusion felt more like an afterthought than anything."

== Introduced in Mortal Kombat II ==
=== Kintaro ===
Voiced by: Rhasaan Orange (2011 game), Dave B. Mitchell (Battle of the Realms)

Kintaro is the sub-boss for both Mortal Kombat II and also in the 2011 reboot. He is also the penultimate boss of Mortal Kombat Shaolin Monks. A Shokan, he shares his species' four arms and imposing size, but is distinguished by his tiger-like stripes. Kintaro participates in Shao Kahn's attempt to conquer Earthrealm during the second game's tournament, in which he is defeated by Liu Kang. In the reboot, he is defeated by Kung Lao during the tournament. The reboot also establishes him as being responsible for Kabal's injuries. In the 2015 Mortal Kombat X prequel comic, Kintaro is killed by Sonya Blade while she is under Havik's control.

The character was a stop-motion clay figure whose design was inspired by the Japanese mythological character Kintarō. He was initially conceived for MKII as an anthropomorphic fur-lined bipedal tiger, but the concept was scrapped due to the difficulty of creating such a complicated outfit. According to series co-creator John Tobias, Kintaro was redesigned as a "Goro spinoff" who was possibly a Shokan general, but not royalty.

Kintaro appears in the animated film Mortal Kombat Legends: Battle of the Realms, voiced by Dave B. Mitchell.

Kintaro has received a middling reception due to his minor role in the series and is often unfavorably compared to Goro; UGO Networks opined in 2012 that Kintaro "serves no real purpose except for being a reskinned Goro whose sole purpose is to avenge the aforementioned's death" in the conclusion of the original game. Game Informer, in 2021, rated him 56th among the series' 76 playable characters: "Kintaro’s arrival wasn’t as impactful as Goro's since the Shokan boss thing had already been done before. NetherRealm also seems content with giving him more and more feline attributes in place of a personality." Den of Geek wrote that he "has virtually no story to speak of outside of the [MK9] retcon". His "Reverse Rip" from the reboot was rated 35th by Prima Games in their 2014 list of the series' top fifty Fatalities.

=== Noob Saibot ===
Portrayed by: Daniel Pesina (MKII); Richard Divizio (MK3); John Turk (UMK3, MK4); Lawrence Kern (2011 game, MK11); J. J. Perry (Annihilation); Kimball Uddin (Conquest), Joe Taslim (Mortal Kombat II)
Voiced by: Ed Boon (MK:D); Jamieson Price (2011 game); Sean Chiplock (MK11); Kaiji Tang (MK1)

Noob Saibot is an undead wraith from the Netherrealm and a member of a cult called the Brotherhood of the Shadow who worships a fallen Elder God, later revealed to be Shinnok. In Mortal Kombat: Deception, he discovers, reactivates, and reprograms the cyborg ninja Smoke, intending to use his body as the basis for an undead cyborg army. In his ending, he is revealed to be a resurrected Bi-Han, who previously operated as Sub-Zero before he was killed by Scorpion. In Mortal Kombat (2011), Saibot is resurrected off-screen by Quan Chi and Shao Kahn. While defending the former's "Soulnado", Saibot is defeated by his brother and new Sub-Zero Kuai Liang and presumed dead after being pulled into the Soulnado. In Mortal Kombat 11, Saibot resurfaces as a servant of Kronika, having gained increased power. In the new timeline depicted in Mortal Kombat 1's DLC expansion Khaos Reigns (2024), Bi-Han is captured by Titan Havik, who converts him into Saibot.

The character's name comes from the last names of Mortal Kombat's creators, Ed Boon and John Tobias, spelled backwards. Saibot first appeared in Mortal Kombat II (MKII) as a non-playable hidden character and a solid-black palette swap of the game's other male ninja characters, whom players could fight after winning fifty straight matches. Spurred by the positive reaction to the hidden character Reptile from the first game, Boon added Saibot to MKII without Tobias' knowledge, though Tobias would later create the character's initial backstory as a Netherrealm wraith.

He makes a cameo appearance in Mortal Kombat Annihilation, played by J. J. Perry, and in a self-titled episode of Mortal Kombat: Conquest, played by martial artist Kimball Uddin. He appears in the film Mortal Kombat II, portrayed by Joe Taslim, continuing the traditional story of Bi-Han's transformation into the wraith.

Noob Saibot received positive critical reception due to his evolution from a gag palette-swap to a more fully-fledged character, and particularly for his "Make a Wish" Fatality from the 2011 reboot game. In July 2011, The Daily Show's Jon Stewart played a video of the finisher while explaining the U.S. Supreme Court's ruling that the ESRB could regulate video games without government intervention.

=== Smoke ===
Portrayed by: Daniel Pesina (MKII); John Turk (UMK3); Noah Fleder (MK1); Ridley Tsui (Annihilation)
Voiced by: Ed Boon (MKII, UMK3, MK:A); Ken Lally (2011 game); Andrew Bowen (MKX); Jeremy Ratchford (Defenders of the Realm); Matthew Mercer (Battle of the Realms); Yuri Lowenthal (MK1)

Smoke debuted in Mortal Kombat II (MKII) as a non-playable hidden character who emanates smoke from his body and randomly appears at the start of a match to provide vague clues on how to find and fight him, for which specific requirements had to be met by players. Appearing as an unlockable playable character in Mortal Kombat 3 (MK3), he is stated to be a Lin Kuei assassin who works with Kuai Liang / Sub-Zero. After their clan starts turning their best warriors into cyborgs, Smoke attempts to join Kuai Liang in leaving the Lin Kuei. However, the former is captured, converted, and forced to hunt the latter against his will. With Kuai Liang's help, Smoke discovers he still retains his soul and aids him in defeating Lin Kuei cyborgs Cyrax and Sektor, only to be captured by Shao Kahn's forces. During the events of Mortal Kombat: Deception, Smoke is reactivated and reprogrammed by Noob Saibot into serving him as his ally and template for an army of cyber-demons. In Mortal Kombat: Armageddon, Smoke helps Saibot stage an assault on a Lin Kuei temple in Arctika until he is defeated by Taven.

In Mortal Kombat (2011), during which Raiden creates a new timeline while attempting to avert the events of Armageddon, Smoke is rewritten to become Tomas Vrbada, a Czech member of the Lin Kuei who can transform into his namesake. As a child, he was kidnapped by a cult who sought to sacrifice him to a demon, only for Smoke to become an enenra and slay the cultists. In the present, Smoke is chosen by Raiden to help him stop Shao Kahn from taking over Earthrealm. Though Raiden saves Smoke from becoming a cyborg, Kuai Liang is converted in his place before Smoke is killed by Shao Kahn's queen Sindel. Following this, Smoke is resurrected by Quan Chi as an undead revenant, a role he fulfills while making a minor non-playable appearance in Mortal Kombat X (MKX). Additionally, the downloadable playable character Triborg possesses a form based on Smoke's cyborg form.

In Mortal Kombat 1 (MK1), in which Fire God Liu Kang creates a third new timeline, Tomas / Smoke is rewritten once more to become an adoptive brother to Bi-Han / Sub-Zero and Kuai Liang / Scorpion after Smoke's family was killed for accidentally trespassing on Lin Kuei grounds. Though he lacks supernatural abilities, Smoke is skilled in practical magic. After Bi-Han betrays them to join forces with Shang Tsung, Smoke joins Kuai Liang in breaking off to found the Shirai Ryu clan to oppose him.

Smoke, based on his MK3 portrayal, appears in the Mortal Kombat: Defenders of the Realm episode "Old Friends Never Die". He appears in Mortal Kombat Annihilation, in which he is killed in battle by Liu Kang.

Smoke has received mostly positive reception, while his "Earth Detonation" Fatality from MK3 has been noted by critics for its outlandish nature.

== Introduced in Mortal Kombat 3 and updates ==
=== Chameleon ===
Portrayed by: John Turk (MKT)
Voiced by: Ed Boon (MKT)

Chameleon is a mysterious warrior who possesses the abilities of all the franchise' male ninjas. He is distinguished by his partially transparent appearance and an outfit that constantly changes its colors. Chameleon appeared in the PlayStation, Sega Saturn, and PC versions of Mortal Kombat Trilogy with no biography or ending; he is instead only referred to as "one of Shao Kahn's deadliest warriors". His Armageddon ending is also vague, revealing only that he had sought to become Mortal Kombat champion since the events of the first game.

The character was ranked 32nd in UGO's 2012 selection of the top fifty series characters, who wrote "They say copying is a form of flattery, so Chameleon makes our list." Complex rated him tenth in their 2011 selection of the series' ten "most underrated characters", but IGN's Mitchell Saltzman listed Chameleon and Khameleon as two of the worst Mortal Kombat characters. "Unlike all of the other ninja palette swaps that eventually gained their own identity and playstyle, both Chameleons ... feel more like gimmicks than anything."

=== Cyrax ===
Portrayed by: Sal Divita (MK3, UMK3); Shane Warren Jones (Legacy)
Voiced by: Rhasaan Orange (2011 game); Ike Amadi (MK11); Artt Butler (Battle of the Realms); Enuka Okuma(MK1)

Cyrax is an assassin and Motswana member of the Lin Kuei clan who agreed to become a cyborg. First appearing in Mortal Kombat 3, he and fellow cyborg Sektor are tasked with finding and killing former member Kuai Liang. Amidst Outworld emperor Shao Kahn's invasion of Earthrealm however, Cyrax is captured by Kuai Liang, who reprograms him to help him defeat Shao. In Mortal Kombat Gold (2000), Cyrax experiences flashbacks of his former life as Sonya Blade and Jax Briggs bring him to the Outer World Investigation Agency (OIA) headquarters to restore his humanity. In return, Cyrax joins the agency as a scout. In Mortal Kombat: Deadly Alliance, Cyrax encounters the vampire Nitara, who offers to help him return to Earthrealm in exchange for his assistance in finding Onaga's egg.

In Mortal Kombat (2011), following Raiden's alterations to the timeline, Cyrax is rewritten to become a human Tswana member of the Lin Kuei who relies on his chi and opposes the "Cyber Initiative". Nonetheless, he is captured and forcibly converted off-screen. He and Sektor later capture Kuai Liang and take him to be converted as well before aligning themselves with Shao Kahn and assisting him in his invasion of Earthrealm, only to be defeated by Nightwolf. As of Mortal Kombat 11, Cyrax joined forces with Kronika to help Sektor bolster her forces with more cyborgs. However, Kuai Liang and Hanzo Hasashi defeat Cyrax, causing him to realize what happened to him, then convince him to help them stop her instead. Though Kuai Liang promises to help restore him, Cyrax chooses to sacrifice himself to destroy Sektor's cyber factory.

Two incarnations of Cyrax appear in Mortal Kombat 1. The original appears as an assist character, or "Kameo Fighter", while a female incarnation appears as a downloadable playable character via the Khaos Reigns DLC. After Fire God Liu Kang creates another new timeline while stopping Kronika, Cyrax was rewritten once more to become a Nigerien Lin Kuei clanswoman and Sektor's apprentice who wears a powered suit developed by the latter. Initially believing her grandmaster Bi-Han's deception, she later discovers his corrupt nature and defects to the Shirai Ryu.

The original Cyrax appears in the Mortal Kombat: Legacy episode "Cyrax & Sektor", played by Shane Warren Jones.

According to John Tobias, Cyrax and the cyber ninjas were inspired by the Predator and Boba Fett.

The original Cyrax was included in GamesRadar's 2011 list of "gaming's most malicious machines", and Complex ranked him the fourth-coolest robot in video games in 2012. His episode of Legacy was well received, but critical reaction to his Fatalities has been mixed.

=== Kabal ===
Portrayed by: Richard Divizio (MK3, UMK3 and MKT); Carlos Pesina (MK:D, MK:A); Daniel Nelson (2021 film)
Voiced by: Jarod Pranno (MK:A); David Lodge (2011 game); Jonathan Cahill (MK11); Kevin Michael Richardson (Defenders of the Realm); Damon Herriman (2021 film); Keith Silverstein (Snow Blind)

Kabal is a former member of Kano's Black Dragon crime syndicate and one of Raiden's champions in defending Earthrealm who was attacked, maimed, and scarred by Shao Kahn's extermination squads. As a result, Kabal was forced to wear a respirator to survive and left the Black Dragon. Following an appearance as a non-playable character (NPC) in Mortal Kombat: Deadly Alliance, Kabal returns in Mortal Kombat: Deception, in which he is tasked by Havik with restoring the Black Dragon. In pursuit of this, he recruits arms dealer Kira and martial artist turned killer Kobra. In Mortal Kombat: Armageddon, Kabal confronts the demigod Taven and offers the latter membership into the Black Dragon, but is defeated.

In Mortal Kombat (2011), after Raiden alters the timeline to avert the events of Armageddon, Kabal is rewritten to become a former Black Dragon member who became a NYPD riot control officer partnered with Kurtis Stryker. Amidst Shao Kahn's invasion of Earthrealm, Kabal is grievously injured by Kintaro and kidnapped by Kano, who nurses him back to health with help from the sorcerer Shang Tsung and outfits him with a respirator due to his lungs being damaged beyond repair. Kabal eventually escapes to join Raiden and his champions in defending Earthrealm, only to be killed by Shao's queen, Sindel and converted by the necromancer Quan Chi into one of his undead revenant slaves. In this state, Kabal makes minor appearances in Mortal Kombat X, in which he appears as an NPC, and Mortal Kombat 11, which additionally features a young time-displaced Kabal who had yet to leave the Black Dragon.

Kabal appears in the Mortal Kombat: Defenders of the Realm episode "Amends", which is based on his MK3 backstory; the script for Mortal Kombat Annihilation before he was cut during production; Mortal Kombat (2021) as one of Shang Tsung's champions before he is killed by Liu Kang; and Mortal Kombat Legends: Snow Blind as a member of the Black Dragon.

Kabal was originally nicknamed "Sandman" during production of MK3 before his name was determined. According to Mortal Kombat co-creator John Tobias, Kabal's overall design was inspired by the Tusken Raiders from Star Wars while his mask's circular lenses were inspired by 1940s-style aviator goggles. Tobias, however, expressed his dissatisfaction with Kabal's original design in a 2012 interview.

Kabal has received mostly positive critical reception, but received notoriety for being overpowered in MK3, while response to his Fatalities throughout his series appearances has been mixed.

=== Khameleon ===
Portrayed by: Becky Gable (MKT)
Voiced by: Johanna Añonuevo (Armageddon), Courtenay Taylor (MK1)

Khameleon is a Zaterran who possesses the abilities of the franchise's female ninjas. She is the last known female of her race. She was introduced in the Nintendo 64 version of Mortal Kombat Trilogy. Due to Shao Kahn's role in her race's near extinction, Khameleon seeks revenge against him. Khameleon was the franchise's only previously playable character excluded in the original release of Armageddon, but was added to the Wii version. Series art director Steve Beran acknowledged that she was included in Armageddon due to heavy fan demand.

In the new timeline depicted in Mortal Kombat 1, Khameleon is a Saurian and the first of her kind to join the Umgadi, warrior priestesses who guard Outworld's royal family. Additionally, she also appears as a downloadable assist character, or "Kameo Fighter".

The character placed 33rd in UGO's selection of the top fifty series characters, but IGN's Mitchell Saltzman listed Khameleon with Chameleon among the series' worst. "Unlike all of the other ninja palette swaps that eventually gained their own identity and playstyle, both Chameleons ... feel more like gimmicks than anything."

=== Motaro ===

Portrayed by: Deron McBee (Annihilation)

Motaro is a Centaurian from Outworld who possesses immense strength, the ability to teleport, fire energy blasts from his tail, and deflect incoming projectiles. First appearing as a sub-boss in Mortal Kombat 3 and its updates, he leads Shao Kahn's extermination squads during his invasion of Earthrealm. Motaro returns in Mortal Kombat: Armageddon as a minotaur due to a curse on his species placed by the Shokan.

Motaro makes minor non-speaking appearances in Mortal Kombat (2011) and Mortal Kombat 1 (MK1), with the former seeing him being killed by Raiden and the latter seeing him serve as a member of General Shao's rebellion. Additionally, Motaro appears as an unlockable assist character, or "Kameo Fighter", in MK1 and his quadrupedal physique was restored for both games.

Motaro has also appeared in Mortal Kombat Annihilation, Mortal Kombat: Defenders of the Realm, and Mortal Kombat Legends: Scorpion's Revenge.

John Tobias said that Motaro was inspired by a Micronauts toy figure of Baron Karza, which could be turned into a centaur by combining the toy with a horse figure packaged alongside it. Described by Ed Boon as one of the "oddest shaped" Mortal Kombat characters, Motaro was nearly excluded from Armageddon due to the developers' difficulty of compensating for his unique half-horse body shape. With fans desiring to see the character return, the developers removed Motaro's hind legs to allow him in the game.

Motaro placed 31st in UGO's 2012 ranking of the top fifty Mortal Kombat characters, noting him being a tough sub-boss to defeat. Den of Geek ranked Motaro 42nd in their 2015 rating of the franchise's then-64 playable characters. Marcus Stewart of Game Informer rated Motaro 57th in his 2021 ranking of the 76 playable series characters. "You'd think a centaur would be a cooler character, but Motaro hasn't made a ton of noise since his '90s heyday." The bipedal version of Motaro was criticized by Robert Naytor of Hardcore Gaming 101 and ScrewAttack, with the former considering his four legs "the one cool thing he had going for him" and the latter stating that he had lost his most defining trait.

=== Rain ===
Portrayed by: John Turk (MKT); Tyrone Wiggins (Annihilation); Percy Brown (Conquest)
Voiced by: Rino Romano (Defenders of the Realm); Andrew Bowen (MKX); Dempsey Pappion (MK11); Noshir Dalal (MK1)

First appearing as a non-player character (NPC) in Ultimate Mortal Kombat 3's attract mode before becoming a playable character in the home version of UMK3 and the compilation title Mortal Kombat Trilogy (1996), Rain is an Edenian prince who had been smuggled from his homeland amidst Outworld emperor Shao Kahn's takeover. Millennia later, the former resurfaces during Shao's invasion of Earthrealm to join him. Following a minor appearance in Mortal Kombat: Deception's (2004) training mode, Rain returns in Mortal Kombat: Armageddon (2006), in which he learns from Outworld sorcerer Quan Chi that he is a direct descendant of Argus, Edenia's protector god and half-sibling of Taven and Daegon, both of whom were favored by their father to assume his mantle as Edenia's protector. He later confronts the former, only to be defeated.

Returning as a downloadable playable character in Mortal Kombat (2011), Raiden alters the timeline to avert the events of Armageddon. Due to this, Rain is stated to have been orphaned at a young age during Shao Kahn's invasion of Edenia and raised by Edenian resistance fighters. Growing up, he developed a reputation as an exceptional yet arrogant warrior before betraying his comrades after being refused leadership of the resistance. This caught Shao's attention, who offered Rain a place in his army in exchange for his services. Appearing as an NPC in Mortal Kombat X (2015), Rain served as advisor to Shao's successor Mileena before she was overthrown by Kotal Kahn. In the present, Rain attempts to help Mileena reassume the throne, but is thwarted by D'Vorah. Following this, Rain returns as a downloadable playable character once more in Mortal Kombat 11. In his ending, he discovers his father Argus betrayed his birth mother Amara by faking his death, leading to her committing suicide while Rain was sold to another family. Swearing vengeance, he leaves his stepmother Delia to suffer a similar fate as Amara.

Rain appears as a playable character in Mortal Kombat 1. While creating a second new timeline, Fire God Liu Kang removed Rain's divinity and made him Zeffeero, an ambitious sorcerer who went on to become High Mage of Outworld's royal court. Although Rain and Daegon are still half-brothers in this timeline. After aiding in Quan Chi, Shang Tsung, and General Shao's failed attempt to conquer Outworld and Earthrealm, Rain goes into hiding and allies himself with Havik, who has him destroy Orderrealm's capital, Seido. Wracked with guilt over what he did, Rain subsequently turns himself in to Empress Mileena. Additionally, an alternate timeline variant of Rain who became emperor of Outworld and married Tanya appears in the Khaos Reigns DLC.

Rain was inspired by the 1984 Prince song Purple Rain, along with MK co-creator Ed Boon, a longtime fan of the musician, also jokingly wondering what color palette had not yet been used for the series' ninja characters at the time Ultimate Mortal Kombat 3 was in production. After MK Trilogy, the character was given his own distinct designs in future appearances.

Rain has received mixed to negative critical reception for his origins and his Fatalities. UGO ranked him 28th out of the series' top 50 characters in 2012. His later appearances were better received; Den of Geek ranked Rain 36th in his 2015 rating of the 64 series characters due to his MK9 ending and the expansion of his backstory in Armageddon as "a power-hungry jerk who believed that he was owed everything." GamesRadar+ noted his purple palette in the 2011 reboot as "a nice, rarely used color for male fighting game characters", while "his moves are so weird and confounding that they make every match a constant guessing game." Bleeding Cool considered Rain's MK11 appearance as his best to date due to his evolved moveset.

=== Sektor ===
Portrayed by: Sal Divita (MK3, UMK3); Peter Shinkoda (Legacy)
Voiced by: Andrew Kishino (2011 game); Dave B. Mitchell (MK11, Battle of the Realms); Erika Ishii (MK1)

Sektor is an assassin and member of the Lin Kuei clan who agreed to become a cyborg. First appearing in Mortal Kombat 3, he and fellow cyborg Cyrax are tasked with finding and killing former member Kuai Liang. Returning as a hidden character in Mortal Kombat Gold, Sektor comes to view the Lin Kuei's grandmaster as inferior and kills him, but is defeated by Kuai Liang before he can claim the title and flees to Japan to form his own clan of cyborg ninjas. Following this, Sektor makes a minor appearance in Mortal Kombat: Armageddon.

In Mortal Kombat (2011), after Raiden alters the timeline to avert the events of Armageddon, Sektor initially appears as a human Chinese member of the Lin Kuei who fervently supports the impending Cyber Lin Kuei initiative. After becoming a cyborg, he captures Kuai Liang to convert him as well before aligning himself with Outworld emperor Shao Kahn and assisting in his invasion of Earthrealm, only to be defeated by Nightwolf. As of Mortal Kombat X, Sektor was killed. While studying his memories, Kuai Liang discovers the former contributed to the Shirai Ryu clan's destruction and the feud between Kuai Liang and Hanzo Hasashi. Furthermore, the downloadable playable character Triborg sports a variation based on Sektor.

In Mortal Kombat 11, a time-displaced Sektor was recruited by Kronika to help bolster her forces. To fulfill this task, he kidnapped several Lin Kuei clansmen and forcibly converted them into cyborgs until Kuai Liang, Hasashi, and Cyrax destroy his factory. Nonetheless, Kronika's forces recover Sektor's body and use him to complete the cyborg army before sacrificing them to destroy the Special Forces' base.

Two incarnations of Sektor appear in Mortal Kombat 1, with the original appearing as an assist character, or "Kameo Fighter", while a female incarnation appears as a downloadable playable character via the Khaos Reigns DLC. After Fire God Liu Kang creates another new timeline while stopping Kronika, Sektor was rewritten to become the daughter of the Lin Kuei's master armorer, Longwei, and one of its leading warriors, Madam Bo. Growing up, Sektor would go on to become Longwei's apprentice, later successor, in addition to being a warrior. In the present, Sektor advises the Lin Kuei's grandmaster, Bi-Han, to bolster their forces with machinery. This would lead to her developing two powered suits for the clan's use and becoming one of his most trusted advisors and lover. In the Khaos Reigns DLC, she joins the Lin Kuei in ambushing the Shirai Ryu to test the suits, only to be captured. When Titan Havik's forces attack their timeline, capture Bi-Han, and convert him into Noob Saibot, Sektor reluctantly joins forces with Scorpion and Cyrax to rescue him. Once Havik is defeated, Bi-Han is captured by Liu Kang, who allows Sektor to leave and become the Lin Kuei's acting grandmaster while he works to cure Bi-Han. In her ending, Sektor rescues Bi-Han and vows revenge on Liu Kang, believing he had no intention of curing the former.

The original Sektor appears in the Mortal Kombat: Legacy episode "Cyrax & Sektor", played by Peter Shinkoda; plays a minor role in DC Comics' Mortal Kombat X: Blood Ties comic miniseries; and appears in Mortal Kombat Legends: Battle of the Realms (2021).

Sektor was nicknamed "Ketchup" during production of MK3 before his official name was determined, while the robot ninjas' designs were inspired by Boba Fett and the Predator. He has been lauded by gaming media outlets for his Fatalities over the course of the Mortal Kombat series. UGO placed him 26th in their 2012 list of their top fifty series characters.

=== Sheeva ===
Portrayed by: Marjean Holden (Annihilation)
Voiced by: Dawnn Lewis (Defenders of the Realm); Lori McClain (Armageddon); Lani Minella (2011 game); Vanessa Marshall (MK11)

Sheeva is a Shokan warrior like Goro and Kintaro, and is the series' lone female representative of the four-armed race. She has a long-standing rivalry with Motaro, as the Shokan and his race of Centaurians are bitter enemies. She debuts in MK3 as Queen Sindel's appointed bodyguard and protector following Shao Kahn's invasion of Earth. She is not playable in the series again until Mortal Kombat: Armageddon, in which the then-entire series roster is playable. In the 2011 reboot that retells the continuity of the first three games, she is immediately playable and plays a minor role in the game's story mode as Kahn's bodyguard and jailer. In Mortal Kombat 11, Sheeva was a late addition to the roster as downloadable content as part of the game's Aftermath expansion pack. She additionally has a more significant role in the series for the first time, as she aids a time-traveling Shang Tsung in retrieving Kronika's Crown of Souls so Liu Kang can restore history after exploiting her blood oath to Sindel. Sheeva assists in reviving Sindel so she can join them as well, but upon learning of her treachery Sheeva attempts to stop her but is defeated.

The character's name was derived from Shiva, the Hindu deity of destruction. She was added to the game due to fan requests for a playable version of Goro, like whom she was created as a stop motion-animated clay figurine. Series co-creator John Tobias opted for a female version of the character as she would be physically smaller in size and thus take up less room on the screen. She was omitted from the home versions of Ultimate Mortal Kombat 3 due to memory constraints.

Sheeva (voiced by Dawnn Lewis) had a recurring role in the 1996 animated series Mortal Kombat: Defenders of the Realm. In the 1997 film Mortal Kombat Annihilation, she was played by Marjean Holden in a minor role with her only action sequence being a brief scuffle with Motaro, though the film acknowledges her then-current role in the games as Sindel's personal protector. In the 2015 Mortal Kombat X: Blood Ties prequel comic miniseries produced by DC Comics, Sheeva is crowned by Kintaro as the current leader of the Shokan in a peaceful treaty with Kotal Kahn, following the death of previous rule King Gorbak. Sheeva mourns Kintaro's death after Sonya — possessed by Havik — kills him in battle.

Reception of the character has been mixed. While Wirtualna Polska featured Sheeva among gaming's top ten female villains in 2011, she placed a middling 28th in UGO.com's 2012 ranking of their top fifty Mortal Kombat characters, and 47th in Den of Geek's 2019 ranking of the series' 77 playable characters. Game Informer, in 2010, stated that "despite a somewhat cool ground-pound move [in MK3], she was an addition to the series that never really served a purpose or did anything particularly noteworthy." However, her Fatalities over the course of her appearances have been fairly well received.

=== Sindel ===
Portrayed by: Lia Montelongo (MK3); Musetta Vander (Annihilation); Beatrice Ilg (Legacy); Ana Thu Nguyen (Mortal Kombat II)
Voiced by: Laura Boton (MK:D); Lani Minella (MK 2011); Kelly Hu (MKX); Mara Junot (2019–present)

Sindel debuts as a playable character in Mortal Kombat 3 (MK3) as the queen of Edenia alongside her daughter, Princess Kitana, before their kingdom lost ten consecutive Mortal Kombat tournaments, leading to Shao Kahn invading them to forcibly merge their realms. After he killed her husband King Jerrod and adopted the then-infant Kitana, Sindel committed suicide to avoid becoming his consort. Years later however, Shao and Shang Tsung resurrect her without her memories and brainwash her to assist in the former's invasion of Earthrealm. After Earthrealm's defenders defeat Shao, Kitana convinces Sindel of her true past, turning her against Shao.

Sindel appears as a non-playable character (NPC) in Mortal Kombat 4 (MK4), in which her subject Tanya betrays Edenia and allows Shinnok's Netherrealm forces to invade her palace. Kitana escapes, but Sindel is imprisoned in her dungeon until Shinnok's forces are defeated. Following this, she sends Kitana to form an alliance with the Shokan armies and lead them into battle against a weakened Shao while Sindel stays behind to restore Edenia. Returning as a playable character in Mortal Kombat: Deception (MK:D), Edenia is invaded by Onaga, who killed, resurrected, and brainwashed Sindel, among others, before imprisoning her until she is freed by Jade. Sindel appears as a playable character in Mortal Kombat: Armageddon, though she does not play a role in the story mode.

In Mortal Kombat (2011), due to Raiden altering the timeline and changing the events of the franchise's first three games, Sindel is instead resurrected by Quan Chi and receives Shang Tsung's powers before she kills most of Earthrealm's warriors and Kitana before Nightwolf sacrifices himself to kill her. Quan Chi subsequently converts the dead warriors into his undead revenant servants, a role Sindel fulfills while making a minor appearance as a NPC in Mortal Kombat X.

Sindel appears as a downloadable playable character in Mortal Kombat 11 (MK11) via the Aftermath expansion pack, in which her history is retconned. When Shao invaded Edenia, she willingly sided and married him, killed Jerrod herself for his perceived weakness, and claimed Shao did so to appease her subjects. Quan Chi, believing she was distracting Shao, later killed her and staged it as a suicide before using her soul to temporarily stop Shao from invading Earthrealm. In the present, Shang Tsung captures her revenant and revives her to help him steal Kronika's Crown of Souls. Sindel agrees while also reconsolidating her power with Shao before betraying and defeating Kitana and Earthrealm's forces. After helping Shang Tsung breach Kronika's keep however, the sorcerer in turn betrays Sindel and Shao, absorbing their souls in retaliation for killing him to empower Sindel.

Sindel appears as a playable character in Mortal Kombat 1. After Fire God Liu Kang created a second new timeline while stopping Kronika, Sindel is rewritten to become the firm yet fair empress of Outworld and biological mother of Kitana and Mileena, the latter of whom is set to inherit her throne, who maintains the Mortal Kombat tournaments alongside Liu Kang in the late Jerrod's memory. Though she is a just ruler, Sindel is strict in preparing Mileena to succeed her and becomes more determined to protect her realm and the throne following Jerrod's death. She also employs Shang Tsung to help with Mileena's Tarkat disease, unaware that he and General Shao are conspiring against her and encouraging her to turn against Earthrealm until they are exposed by Liu Kang and Earthrealm's warriors. Sindel is later reunited with Jerrod after Quan Chi uses his soul, among others, to create Ermac and the former gains control of the body, before she is killed by her counterpart from Titan Shang Tsung's timeline. Before she dies, she entrusts Mileena with Outworld's throne before Jerrod preserves her soul within Ermac, where the pair work together to fight off the other souls and maintain control of the body.

During production of MK3, Sindel was nicknamed "The Bride" and "Muchacha" by the developers before her official name was determined. She was played by actress Lia Montelongo, who was nineteen years old at the time.

Sindel appears as a supporting character in Mortal Kombat Annihilation, portrayed by Musetta Vander. In addition to her original trilogy backstory and role, she is also named the new general of Shao Kahn's extermination squads following her resurrection and brainwashing. Amidst Earthrealm's warriors' final battle with Shao, Kitana defeats and spares Sindel. After Liu Kang defeats Shao, the latter's curse on Sindel is broken. She also appears in the Mortal Kombat Legacy episode "Kitana and Mileena - Part 1", portrayed by Beatrice Ilg, and appears in the sequel Mortal Kombat II, portrayed by Ana Thu Nguyen.

Sindel has been positively received for her role in the games and her Fatalities, but her MK11 retcon was met with heavy fan criticism, while her portrayal in Annihilation has been ridiculed.

=== Stryker ===
Portrayed by: Michael O'Brien (MK3); Lawrence Kern (MK 2011); Tahmoh Penikett (Legacy); Eric Jacobus (Legacy II)
Voiced by: Ron Perlman (Defenders of the Realm); Matthew Mercer (MK 2011, Battle of the Realms)

Kurtis Stryker is a coast NYPD riot control officer selected by Raiden to help defend Earthrealm against invading forces from Outworld. One of the franchise's few characters who does not possess any special powers, he employs modern weaponry such as explosives, firearms, tasers and nightsticks for his special moves and Fatalities. During the events of MK3, he was the leader of the riot control brigade when Outworld's portal opened over New York City. Stryker attempted to keep order among the populace in the ensuing chaos, but soon all human souls were usurped by Shao Kahn with the exception of those that belonged to Raiden's chosen warriors, including himself. Initially ignorant of why he was spared, he entered the fray with the intention of avenging the lives of the innocent that he had vowed to protect and serve. Along with the other warriors, he assisted in liberating Earthrealm from Shao Kahn's clutches. His next playable appearance is in MK Armageddon, in which he is still oblivious as to why he was chosen by the Elder Gods. In the Battle of Armageddon, he fights Mileena, Kabal and Kano, yet he is ultimately slain along with the other combatants. In the 2011 series reboot, Stryker is Kabal's SWAT team leader who joins Raiden and his followers in repelling the Outworld invasion. He is later killed, along with most of the Earthrealm heroes, by Sindel and subsequently resurrected by Quan Chi and forced to fight Raiden, in a losing effort. He makes brief nonplayable appearances in Mortal Kombat X and Mortal Kombat 11 as an undead revenant fighting for Quan Chi and Shinnok.

A character named "Kurtis Stryker" was originally slated to appear in the first Mortal Kombat, but the idea was dropped in place of a female fighter (Sonya Blade). The character would appear in Mortal Kombat II renamed Jax, and Stryker was finally made an original character in MK3. Stryker was originally conceived by the developers as a SWAT-type character with several additional weapons, but the game's memory limitations prevented this. He appeared in Armageddon with a complete redesign into a much more futuristic-looking character, armed with two back-mounted knives that were never used.

Stryker has made several appearances in alternate series media, starting as a featured character (voiced by Ron Perlman) in the 1996 animated series Mortal Kombat: Defenders of the Realm. He appeared in the premiere episode of the 2011 first season of the web series Mortal Kombat: Legacy as a SWAT leader under Jax's command, and had a recurring role in the 2013 second season. In the 2021 animated film Mortal Kombat Legends: Battle of the Realms, he represents Earthrealm in the tournament, defeating Baraka in battle but losing to Shang Tsung, after which he is magically manipulated into killing himself by the sorcerer.

The character has received negative reception for his "common man" presence in the otherworldly atmosphere of the Mortal Kombat series. However, Den of Geek ranked Stryker 21st in their 2015 rating of the franchise's 64 playable characters, citing his sucker-punching of Mileena in Armageddon's opening cinematic sequence and Perlman's portrayal in the animated series, in addition to "really [becoming] something worth caring about in the reboot, where he came off as a likeable, disgruntled smart-ass." Robert Naytor of Hardcore Gaming 101 praised Stryker in the reboot as being "so badass" and "the closest thing you'll get to being John McClane in a fighting game."

== Introduced in Mortal Kombat Mythologies: Sub-Zero ==
=== Fujin ===
Portrayed by: Anthony Marquez (MKM:SZ); Nic Toussaint (MKX)
Voiced by: Herman Sanchez (MK4), David Horachek (MK:A), Troy Baker (MKX), Matthew Yang King (MK11)

Fujin is the god of wind based on the Japanese deity of the same name. He first appears as an unnamed boss in Mythologies: Sub-Zero, in which he unsuccessfully guards Shinnok's amulet from Sub-Zero. He makes his playable debut in Mortal Kombat 4 and succeeds Raiden as Earthrealm's protector when Raiden becomes an Elder God. Fujin returns in Armageddon and is defeated by Taven after attempting to prevent him from continuing his quest. In the rebooted timeline, Fujin appears in Mortal Kombat X's story mode fighting the Netherrealm's forces alongside Raiden, but is not playable until his inclusion in the Aftermath expansion for Mortal Kombat 11, in which he, Shang Tsung, and Nightwolf try to save their universe by obtaining Kronika's crown. Fujin is ultimately betrayed by Shang Tsung, who drains his soul, but keeps him alive to continue draining his powers for eternity. In Shang Tsung's ending, Fujin and Raiden become his servants.

Fujin placed 40th in UGO's 2012 listing of the top 50 series characters. In 2014, Prima Games included Fujin among their twenty "cheapest" characters in the series due to having a crossbow as his primary weapon in Mortal Kombat 4. For his later appearances, the crossbow could only be used for special attacks.

=== Quan Chi ===
Portrayed by: Richard Divizio (MKM:SZ, MK4); Carlos Pesina (MK:D, MK:A); Adoni Maropis (Conquest); Michael Rogers (Legacy); Damon Herriman (Mortal Kombat II)
Voiced by: Herman Sanchez (MK4, MK:A); Nigel Casey (MK:D); Ronald M. Banks (MK vs DC,2011 game, MKX); Nick Chinlund (Defenders of the Realm); Darin De Paul (Scorpion's Revenge); Sean T. Krishnan (MK1)

Quan Chi is a nefarious free-roaming sorcerer who is one of the Mortal Kombat series' main villains. He is first seen in MK Mythologies when he hires both Sub-Zero and his rival Scorpion to find a map leading to the amulet in hopes that they would meet in combat; indeed, Sub-Zero kills Scorpion in battle, after which Quan Chi eliminates Scorpion's Shirai Ryu clan and sends Sub-Zero to find the amulet, which is later revealed to be a fake while Quan Chi kept the real one for himself. After reviving Scorpion as an undead revenant, Quan Chi tells him that Sub-Zero was responsible for the deaths of his clan and family. He makes his playable debut in Mortal Kombat 4, in which he joins forces with disgraced Elder God Shinnok, who had been banished to the Netherealm by the thunder god Raiden after centuries of warring, in ruling the realm. He is the title character along with Shang Tsung in Mortal Kombat: Deadly Alliance (2002), in which he brokers a deal with Shang Tsung for his assistance in reviving the army of Onaga (the game's final boss) in exchange for souls that would preserve Shang Tsung's youth, then eliminate evil Outworld emperor Shao Kahn and the perennial Mortal Kombat champion Liu Kang. They kill Raiden's Earthrealm defenders, but the partnership dissolves when Shang Tsung attempts to steal Shinnok's amulet to take control of Onaga's army for himself. In his futile attempt to stop Onaga, Raiden sacrifices himself by triggering a violent explosion and seemingly killing the Deadly Alliance as well. In Mortal Kombat: Armageddon (2006), Quan Chi attempts to acquire the godlike power of the elemental Blaze. During the battle royal among the combatants on the Pyramid of Argus in the game's opening cinematic sequence, Quan Chi wounds Kenshi in battle before Shang Tsung (disguised as Ermac) throws him off the pyramid. In the game's training mode, Quan Chi suggests that he, Shang Tsung, Shao Kahn, and Onaga work together to defeat the forces of good, but is secretly serving as a double agent for Shinnok.

Quan Chi was the lone playable character from the three-dimensional series of games included in the immediate roster of the 2011 Mortal Kombat reboot. In the game's story mode, Quan Chi is present at the Shaolin Tournament from the outset, with the resurrected Scorpion serving as his personal assassin. They join forces in the tournament to face the Shaolin monk Liu Kang, but both are defeated. During the second tournament in Shao Kahn's Outworld arena, Quan Chi and Shang Tsung join forces against Kung Lao but are defeated. In the retold events of Mortal Kombat 3 therein, Quan Chi revives the deceased Queen Sindel in order to enable Shao Kahn to invade Earthrealm, after having resurrected the dead elder Sub-Zero — killed by Scorpion in the first tournament — as Noob Saibot to assist him in his plans. He later constructs a Soulnado to take every soul on Earth, but his plans are thwarted by Nightwolf. After Sindel massacres the Earthrealm warriors assembled to stop Shao Kahn's takeover, Raiden seeks cooperation between Earth and the Netherealm by offering Quan Chi their souls as compensation, but Quan Chi has transformed them into his revenant slaves. However, he inadvertently causes Shao Kahn's downfall when he reveals the Elder Gods are obligated to stop the tyrant for failing to honor Mortal Kombat's rules. Raiden kills Shao Kahn and halts his invasion, but Quan Chi makes preparations for Shinnok's invasion, leading Netherrealm's forces in attacking the weakened Earthrealm and Outworld. In Mortal Kombat X (2015), Quan Chi uses the Earthrealm revenants to aid him in retrieving Shinnok's amulet over the course of two years. Though he succeeds in doing so with the aid of D'Vorah, he is decapitated by the resurrected Hanzo Hasashi (Scorpion) once he learns the sorcerer conspired with the Lin Kuei ninja Sektor to kill the Shirai Ryu.

In Mortal Kombat 1, Quan Chi appears as a DLC character, but makes frequent appearances in the story. In Liu Kang's new timeline, Quan Chi led a meaningless life in the mines before being contacted by "Damashi", who helps him learn his sorcerer abilities. He begins working with Shang Tsung and General Shao to deceive Empress Sindel into turning against Earthrealm and preparing a coup to overthrow her. While creating Ermac, Quan Chi attempts to prepare a soul stealer to unleash on Earthrealm before he is stopped by Ashrah. One of the souls that escapes the contraptions attacks him, resulting in his skin turning white. After discovering that Damashi is Titan Shang Tsung, who is intent on killing everyone in the timeline, Quan Chi and Shang Tsung assist Liu Kang in stopping him. During the final battle, Titan Shang Tsung summons a Titan Quan Chi to assist him, but both ultimately lose.

According to MK co-creator John Tobias, Quan Chi was created as a replacement for Shang Tsung as the main sorcerer character of the series. NetherRealm Studios character artist Solomon Gaitan initially referenced actor Yul Brynner when digitally sculpting Quan Chi's facial features for Mortal Kombat X. Gaitan said that series art director Steve Beran "wanted me to merge Bela Lugosi and Boris Karloff's features" during the design process, in addition to researching vultures: "I wanted him to feel like he was in a permanent state of lurking and stalking; waiting for death to happen."

Quan Chi made his Mortal Kombat series debut in one episode of the 1996 animated series Mortal Kombat: Defenders of the Realm, and was voiced by Nick Chinlund. The character appeared in four episodes of the 1998 television series Mortal Kombat: Conquest, and in the 2011 web series Mortal Kombat: Legacy, Quan Chi appears at the climax of a two-part episode featuring Sub-Zero and Scorpion. In the 2020 animated film Mortal Kombat Legends: Scorpion's Revenge, Quan Chi serves as one of the two main antagonists along with Shang Tsung, and resurrects Hanzo Hasashi to turn him into Scorpion and employ him as his servant for eternity. Damon Herriman played Quan Chi in the feature film Mortal Kombat II.

Quan Chi has received mainly positive critical reception for his role in the games, though Destructoid commented in 2015: "Quan Chi is a dark sorcerer shitbag that nobody likes, both in the fandom and in the series' narrative [for] unsuccessfully scheming behind the back of whatever master he is currently serving like an incompetent, bald Starscream." However, Topless Robot cited Quan Chi in Defenders of the Realm as "the only contribution to [the] franchise that this series made." Reception to his Fatalities has been divisive, with his "Leg Beatdown" from MK4 rated among the series' best, and the "Neck Stretch" from Deadly Alliance among the worst, a sentiment shared by the MK series' developers.

=== Sareena ===
Portrayed by: Lia Montelongo (MKM:SZ)
Voiced by: Danielle Nicolet (MKX), Mara Junot (MK1), Jennifer Grey (Cage Match)

Sareena is a demon from the Netherrealm. She debuts in Mythologies: Sub-Zero as an assassin assigned by Quan Chi to kill Sub-Zero. After being spared by him, she assists him in defeating Quan Chi but is killed by Shinnok. Sareena returns as a playable character in the Tournament Edition port of Mortal Kombat: Deadly Alliance, which reveals Shinnok's attack banished her to a lower plane of the Netherrealm. Escaping through a portal, she is offered asylum in Earthrealm by the younger Sub-Zero. However, the training mode of Armageddon sees her again serving Quan Chi, leading to her being defeated by Taven. Following a background cameo in the 2011 reboot, Sareena appears in the story mode of Mortal Kombat X, in which she assists the Special Forces in battling the Netherrealm's forces. In Mortal Kombat 1, she appears as an assist-based Kameo fighter, where she is able to switch between a human-like appearance and her true, demonic form. She also appears in Ashrah's Klassic Towers ending, in which Ashrah rescues her from Quan Chi's control.

Sareena appears as one of the main antagonists of the 2023 animated film Mortal Kombat Legends: Cage Match voiced by Jennifer Grey. She initially appears as a fictionalized version of Grey herself that Johnny Cage attempts to find in Los Angeles to shoot Ninja Mime with, only to reveal she had been cut off from the Neatherrealm for decades and helped set up Cage's film career with her allies from the Brotherhood of Shadows after she discovered he possessed the "blood of the gods" needed to open a portal to the Neatherrealm and summon Shinnok. While Cage fights Shinnok, she faces off against her former ally Ashrah and unleashes her true demonic form in the process. With help from Cage's assistant Chuck Golden, Ashrah is able to kill and defeat her.

Sareena was ranked 26th on Den of Geek's 2015 rating of the series' 64 playable characters, for being "Sub-Zero's one moment of humanity snowballing into something meaningful".

=== Shinnok ===
Portrayed by: Gary Wingert (MKM:SZ); Carlos Pesina (MK:A); Chris Bashen (MKX); Reiner Schöne (Annihilation)
Voiced by: John Tobias (MK4, MKG); Knute Horwitz (MK:A); Ken Lally (2011 game); Troy Baker (MKX, MK11); Robin Atkin Downes (Battle of the Realms, Cage Match)

One of the franchise's primary villains, Shinnok debuted as the boss of MK Mythologies and made his first playable appearance in the main series with Mortal Kombat 4 in 1997. He appears in MK4 as both a playable character and the final boss of Mortal Kombat 4 and Mortal Kombat X (2015). He is a banished former Elder God who invades and annexes the realm of Edenia with the aid of Quan Chi's forces and the traitorous Edenian Tanya before declaring war against the Elder Gods, specifically Raiden for his punishment, but his mission fails after he is defeated by perennial Mortal Kombat champion Liu Kang. Shinnok's next selectable appearance is along with the then-entire series roster in Mortal Kombat: Armageddon (2006), and he features in the game's training mode as having been a longtime friend of the game's main protagonist Taven, who is under the impression that Shinnok is still a force of good as he rescues him from an attack by Li Mei. Shinnok also makes a brief appearance alongside the forces of evil in the battle royal in the opening cinematic sequence against the other combatants at the Pyramid of Argus, when he summons giant subterranean skeletal hands that pin Raiden to the ground before he is struck with a lightning blast.

Shinnok only appears in the closing of the story mode of the 2011 Mortal Kombat reboot, but is the main villain of Mortal Kombat X. At the start of the story mode, he is sealed inside his own magical amulet, which is possessed over the next twenty-five years by many other characters until Quan Chi is beheaded by Scorpion, freeing Shinnok from inside the amulet. With the aid of D'Vorah and the undead Earthrealm warriors from the previous game, Shinnok invades the Sky Temple, where he subdues Raiden and corrupts the Jinsei (the source of Earthrealm's life force) until a Special Forces unit led by the game's protagonist Cassie Cage arrives to battle the transformed Shinnok (now known as "Corrupted Shinnok") and the revenant army. After Cassie is victorious over Shinnok, Raiden then purifies the Jinsei, which strips Shinnok of his powers. Shinnok returns in the prologue of Mortal Kombat 11 (2019), in which he is tortured and decapitated by Raiden after the events of MKX. His severed head is visited by new boss character Kronika, the Keeper of Time, who expresses sadness at his current state. The game's story mode reveals that Shinnok is actually Kronika's son, as well the brother of fellow Elder God Cetrion.

Shinnok's likeness in Mortal Kombat 4 was based on that of series art director Steve Beran, and like Shang Tsung in the digitized Mortal Kombat games, he was able to mimic the special moves of his opponents, but the graphical limitations of Midway's then-new 3D software prevented him from physically transforming into the characters. Series co-creator and programmer Ed Boon admitted in turn that he felt Shinnok was not imposing enough as a final boss in MK4 due to his having no special moves of his own. He was playable in MKX upon completion of the story mode.

Shinnok appears in the 1997 film Mortal Kombat Annihilation, played by Reiner Schöne and depicted as the father of both Shao Kahn and Raiden. He is not identified by name onscreen until the film's conclusion. The character appeared in the 2021 animated film Mortal Kombat Legends: Battle of the Realms and 2023's Mortal Kombat Legends: Cage Match and was voiced by Robin Atkin Downes.

Critical reception has been mainly negative due to his perceived weak stature as a final boss in the series, though his Fatalities have been better received. Den of Geek ranked Shinnok 35th in their 2015 rating of the series' 73 playable characters, critical of how he was "just a lazy Shang Tsung" in MK4, while "it wasn't until Armageddon and Mortal Kombat 9 that they were able to make him seem like an actual threat," and further adding that in MKX, he "was pretty fun as a hybrid of Emperor Palpatine and Loki."

== Introduced in Mortal Kombat 4 ==
=== Jarek ===
Performed by: Mark Myers (MK4)
Voiced by: Jon Hey (MK4), James Freeman-Hargis (MK:A)

Jarek is a member of the Black Dragon clan. Established as the last known member of the Black Dragon, he possesses Kano's special moves and Fatalities. He helps defend Earthrealm against Shinnok, but gets thrown off a cliff by Jax in the aftermath when the Special Forces attempt to arrest him. In Armageddon, Jarek is revealed to have survived and develops an obsession with killing all of his opponents. Jarek also appears as one of the bosses in Special Forces (2000), in which he is defeated by Jax. In the Mortal Kombat X prequel comic, he is imprisoned in Outworld by Kotal Kahn.

The character makes an appearance in the 2022 animated film Mortal Kombat Legends: Snow Blind.

Modeled after Midway character artist Hernan Sanchez, Jarek received a tepid reception for his similarities to Kano. The endings featuring him in Mortal Kombat 4 have also been maligned for their voice acting and dialogue.

=== Kai ===
Portrayed by: Kimball Uddin (MK4)
Voiced by: Ed Boon (MK4)

Kai is a Shaolin Monk and member of the White Lotus Society who is one of the chosen warriors defending Earthrealm from Shinnok. Afterwards, he goes on quest for self-enlightenment, although he returns in Armageddon.

According to Ed Boon, Kai was developed as an "African American character who was very nimble like Liu Kang" with vertical fireball projectiles. He was also the first character to perform a handstand during gameplay, which was intended to be his main fighting style in Armageddon, but Boon stated this was prevented by time limitations.

Kai came in at 47th on UGO's 2012 list of the top 50 Mortal Kombat characters. Robert Naytor of Hardcore Gaming 101 said, "With all his projectile moves, he's basically the black Liu Kang".

=== Meat ===
Meat was originally a skin created by art director Tony Goskie that would depict each fighter in Mortal Kombat 4 as a bloodied corpse. After being established as a canonical character in Deception's Konquest mode, he received a backstory and unique special moves in Armageddon. His Armageddon ending reveals that he is an experiment created by Shang Tsung who escaped the sorcerer's clutches before he could be completed. Prima Games' strategy guide for Armageddon also states that Meat assists Shinnok, although this relationship is not established in the game.

Meat placed 49th in UGO's 2012 listing of the top fifty MK characters, noting that he became a fan favorite for his "ridiculously gruesome moves". Conversely, ScrewAttack ranked Meat fourth in its 2011 ranking of the series' ten worst characters for being "a generic [character] model" without flesh. Ryan Aston of Topless Robot placed Meat second in his selection of eight characters "that are goofy even by Mortal Kombat standards," calling him "a gory riff" on Soulcalibur character Charade and his storyline "a truly flimsy excuse for his existence".

=== Reiko ===
Portrayed by: Jim Helsinger (Conquest), Nathan Jones (2021 film)
Voiced by: Ed Boon (MK:D), David Beron (MK:A), Robin Atkin Downes (Battle of the Realms), Derek Phillips (MK1)

Reiko is a general who has served Shinnok and Shao Kahn. He first appears assisting Shinnok's invasion in Mortal Kombat 4, while Armageddon depicts him under Shao Kahn's command. After making a background cameo in the 2011 reboot, he appears in the Mortal Kombat X prequel comics, in which he becomes a blood god before being betrayed and killed by Havik.

The character was added to Mortal Kombat 4 to replace Noob Saibot after the developers found the game had too many ninja characters. While his original ending simply depicted him walking through a portal, Reiko's FMV ending showed him wearing the helmet of Shao Kahn. This led to speculation that Reiko was Shao Kahn, which was dispelled when the Konquest mode of Deception revealed that Reiko would sneak into Shao Kahn's throne room to wear his helmet. In an interview, John Tobias stated Reiko was intended to be a reincarnation of Shao Kahn, but this story would be disregarded in later installments. Nevertheless, Reiko's appearance and special moves in Armageddon would be stylized after Shao Kahn.

Reiko was played by Jim Helsinger in the 1998 television series Mortal Kombat: Conquest, where he is one of Shao Kahn's generals. Reiko also appeared in the 2021 Mortal Kombat film, portrayed by Nathan Jones, as one of the Outworld champions. In the 2021 animated film Mortal Kombat Legends: Battle of the Realms, he is voiced by Robin Atkin Downes. In the 2023 game Mortal Kombat 1, he is voiced by Derek Phillips.

Reiko placed 42nd on UGO's 2012 list of the top 50 Mortal Kombat characters. Gavin Jasper of Den of Geek rated Reiko last in his 2015 ranking of the series' playable characters for what he considered the wasted potential of his storyline in regards to his connection to Shao Kahn. WhatCulture ranked him fourteenth in their 2015 selection of the series' twenty worst characters for "having zero individuality".

=== Tanya ===
Performed by: Lia Montelongo (MK4)
Voiced by: Rosalind Dugas (MK4), Beth Melewski (MK:D), Jennifer Hale (MKX), Cherise Boothe (MK1)

Tanya is an Edenian who often acts out of self-preservation. During Mortal Kombat 4 (MK4) and Mortal Kombat: Deception, she betrayed Edenia to join Shinnok and Onaga respectively. In Mortal Kombat X (MKX), she joins Mileena's rebellion against Kotal Kahn with the intention of liberating Edenia from Outworld, only to be defeated by D'Vorah and spared at Cassie Cage's behest. In Mileena's ending in Mortal Kombat 11 (MK11), she and Tanya are revealed to be lovers.

In the new timeline depicted in Mortal Kombat 1 (MK1), Tanya is the leader of the Umgadi, a group of warrior priestesses that guard Outworld's royal family, having become one of its most trusted members after Emperor Jerrod was murdered on her predecessor Li Mei's watch and she quit in disgrace. Additionally, Tanya is Princess Mileena's girlfriend despite the Umgadi's rules forbidding relationships. After Jerrod is restored through Ermac and reveals Li Mei was not responsible for his death, Tanya investigates the incident and discovers the Umgadi's Matron Superiors were the true culprits and framed Li Mei. The newly crowned Empress Mileena subsequently puts Tanya in charge of reforming the Umgadi.

Named after Ed Boon's sister Tania, Tanya was created to replace Kitana in MK4. She placed 34th on UGO's 2012 list of the top 50 MK characters. Complex named Tanya seventh in their 2011 selection of the top ten underrated MK characters, calling her "the traitor of all traitors in the series, switching her allegiance more times than we can count". Conversely, Den of Geek rated her 68th in their 2015 ranking of the franchise's 73 player characters for being "a one-dimensional villain whose only quality is betrayal".

== Introduced in Mortal Kombat: Special Forces ==
=== Tremor ===
Voiced by: Fred Tatasciore (MKX), Imari Williams (Snow Blind)

Tremor is a ninja member of the Black Dragon clan. As implied by his name, he is able to manipulate the Earth with his immense strength. He is initially depicted as a brown-clad ninja, but would be redesigned to have a body made out of rocks. Originally intended as a playable character for Mortal Kombat Trilogy, Tremor instead debuted as a boss in Special Forces, in which he is defeated by Jax. He made his playable debut as a downloadable character in Mortal Kombat X, although he has no involvement in the story. In the Mortal Kombat X prequel comic, it is revealed Tremor was imprisoned in Outworld by Kotal Kahn.

== Introduced in Mortal Kombat: Deadly Alliance ==
=== Blaze ===
Voiced by: Simeon Norfleet (MK:A)

Blaze is a fire elemental created to monitor the warriors of the realms. He appears as a hidden character who is forced to protect the last known dragon egg by Onaga's followers. After the egg hatches, completing Onaga's resurrection, Blaze is able to continue monitoring the warriors and discovers they have become too powerful for the realms in his absence. He serves as the final boss of Mortal Kombat: Armageddon, in which he brings all the fighters together for a final battle. As part of his mission to prevent an impending Armageddon, Blaze has Taven face him in a fight intended to either kill all the warriors or strip them of their powers. The story mode of the 2011 reboot reveals Blaze was instead defeated by Shao Kahn, prompting Raiden's efforts to change the timeline.

Prior to becoming a playable character, Blaze originated in the background of Mortal Kombat II's Pit II stage as a Liu Kang palette swap covered in flames and facing off against another Liu Kang palette swap. The character was nicknamed "Torch" by fans, but due to the risk of copyright infringement on the Marvel character Human Torch, Midway officially named him Blaze. In reference to his original role, he has made cameo appearances in Shaolin Monks, the 2011 reboot, Mortal Kombat X, and Mortal Kombat 11.

The character placed 37th on UGO's 2012 list of the top 50 Mortal Kombat characters, which remarked, "Although [guarding the Dragon Egg] doesn't sound like the job of a badass, you'll change your mind once you see Blaze steamrolling his way towards you".

=== Bo' Rai Cho ===
Voiced by: Carlos Pesina (MK:DA, MK:D, MK:A); Steve Blum (MKX)

Bo' Rai Cho is a martial arts master skilled in the style of drunken boxing. His attacks mostly center around his weight and bodily functions. An Outworld native, but an opponent of Shao Kahn's tyranny, he trained Liu Kang and many other Earthrealm warriors for the Mortal Kombat tournament as his participation would be on the behalf of Shao Kahn. Bo' Rai Cho trains Kung Lao after he learns of Liu Kang's death, and in Deception, he rescues Li Mei from having her soul trapped inside one of the corpses of Onaga's army. Bo' Rai Cho is later tricked by Mileena, posing as Kitana, into leading Kitana's army to certain defeat against Baraka's forces, but Bo' Rai Cho emerges victorious with the help of Liu Kang. He returns in Mortal Kombat X, in which he is attacked by Shinnok.

The character's name is a Chineseized play on the word "borracho", which in Spanish means "drunk". According to Herman Sanchez, Bo' Rai Cho was created because Ed Boon sought to have a "slob" fighter, while John Vogel found that he filled the "master" role for the franchise.

Reception to Bo' Rai Cho has been generally negative for his appearance and gross-out nature. Den of Geek ranked him 55th in their rating of the series' 73 characters, calling Bo' Rai Cho "a Shaw Brothers Boogerman, and the gag wears thin after the third time you use his puke attack". Robert Naytor of Hardcore Gaming 101 unfavorably compared him to Virtua Fighter character Shun Di as "a big, fat guy" who is utilized to "throw up and fart a lot". ScrewAttack rated him tenth in their 2011 list of the series' 10 worst characters, noting that his in-game weapon was plain wooden staff. The character was listed as the eighth-worst Mortal Kombat character by Mitchell Saltzman of IGN, who opined, "Bo' Rai Cho feels like a mess of ideas all sloppily thrown together to create a character of contradictions." However, Bo' Rai Cho placed 37th on UGO's 2012 list of the top 50 MK characters, which called his comic relief role "a breath of fresh air. Or, in his case, a belch of fresh air". Complex named him one of the series' most underrated characters in 2011.

=== Drahmin ===
Voiced by: Rich Carle (MK:D)

Drahmin is a demonic Oni who resides in the Netherrealm. He and Moloch are hired by Quan Chi to protect him against Scorpion in exchange for freedom from the Netherrealm, but after Quan Chi betrays them, they align themselves with Shang Tsung to help him counter Quan Chi's treachery. While in Shang Tsung's palace, Drahmin and Moloch encounter Scorpion, who they defeat by throwing into the palace's Soulnado. Drahmin returns in the Mortal Kombat X prequel comic, in which he is killed by Quan Chi.

Ed Boon described Drahmin as one of the most difficult characters to program because specific code had to be written to prevent Drahmin's arm-mounted club from switching sides whenever the character turned around during gameplay. Den of Geek rated him 47th in their 2015 ranking of the 64 series characters, describing him as "a collection of cool concepts that doesn't make for much of a sum" whereas "Moloch does a lot more with less".

=== Frost ===
Voiced by: Christine Rios (MK:A); Kelly Hu (MKX); Sara Cravens (MK11)

Frost is a Lin Kuei warrior who possesses the ability to control ice. She was trained directly by Sub-Zero due to the similarities between them and the potential he saw in her, but her skills were compounded by her arrogant nature. When Sub-Zero has her accompany him to help battle Quan Chi and Shang Tsung, Frost steals his Dragon Medallion and becomes frozen by her own powers. Frost is revealed to have survived in the Unchained port of Deception, in which Sub-Zero traps her in a block of ice after she attempts to kill him. She is freed by Taven in the Konquest mode of Mortal Kombat: Armageddon, but attacks him after mistaking him for Sub-Zero and is defeated. Frost returns as a playable character in Mortal Kombat 11, which depicts her receiving cybernetic enhancements. Aligning herself with Kronika by leading the Cyber Lin Kuei against Earthrealm's heroes, she is defeated by Raiden, who shuts down the cyborgs by deactivating her link to them. Frost returns in Mortal Kombat 1 as a kameo fighter.

The character was the first designed by Herman Sanchez for Deadly Alliance. She was placed eighth in Complex's selection of the series' ten most underrated characters in 2011. Den of Geek placed Frost 37th in their 2015 ranking of the series' 73 player characters, calling her addition "a nice touch" to Sub-Zero's rebuilding of the Lin Kuei.

=== Hsu Hao ===
Hsu Hao is a member of the Red Dragon clan distinguished by his cybernetic heart. After infiltrating the Special Forces, Hsu Hao destroys their Outerworld Investigation Agency branch with a nuclear device. He is eventually found by Jax, who kills him by ripping out his cybernetic heart. Despite this, he returns in Armageddon. Hsu Hao also appears in the Mortal Kombat X comic prequel, in which he is killed by Scorpion.

During development, the character was called Kublai Khan after the Mongolian emperor of the same name. Steve Beran described him as "the anti-Jax" whose cybernetic heart was the result of experiments performed on him by the Chinese army. According to Ed Boon, Hsu Hao had a number of different iterations, with his "Hand Clap" special move inspired by superhero comics.

Hsu Hao is widely regarded as one of the worst characters in the Mortal Kombat franchise. Den of Geek's 2015 ranking of the series' 73 characters placed him as the second-worst. Robert Naytor of Hardcore Gaming 101 described the character as "a slightly racist take at a Village Person". Naming him the series' worst character in 2014, Destructoid noted that "in a game that was littered with lackluster new additions, he was without a doubt the runt of that litter". This negative reception is also present in the development team, with John Vogel intending his death in Deadly Alliance to be canon and Boon making him the first character officially omitted from the Mortal Kombat X playable character roster. In reference to the negative reception, one of Erron Black's pre-match introductions in Mortal Kombat 11 depicts him tossing aside Hsu Hao's severed head. However, Hsu Hao was included in the Joker's MK11 ending, in which they join forces with Havik and Mileena in attacking Orderrealm.

=== Li Mei ===
Voiced by: Lina Chern (MK:D); Tara Strong (MKX); Kelly Hu (MK1); Grey DeLisle (Battle of the Realms)

Li Mei is an Outworld native from a small village who was forced into a tournament by Shang Tsung and Quan Chi with the promise that her victory would free her village. However, upon winning the tournament, Shang Tsung attempts to place her soul into the corpse of one of Onaga's soldiers. In Mortal Kombat: Deception, she was saved by Bo' Rai Cho, but her contact with the corpse causes her to feel a connection with Onaga. Following a cameo appearance in Mortal Kombat X, Li Mei returns as a playable character in Mortal Kombat 1, in which she is depicted as the First Constable of Outworld's capitol Sun Do who once served Empress Sindel and led her royal guard, the Umgadi, until Emperor Jerrod was murdered.

Reception to Li Mei has been mixed, with criticism directed towards her Deception design. Den of Geek rated her 57th in their 2015 ranking of the series' entire 73-character roster, feeling she was "only distinguished by her ridiculous outfit of a bandana and underwear". Joe Pring of WhatCulture rated Li Mei sixth in his 2015 selection of the twenty worst Mortal Kombat characters for "[wearing] a bandana while dancing around in metal-plated underwear", which he stated "deserves to be ridiculed".

=== Mavado ===
Voiced by: Alex Brandon (MK:A)

Mavado is a high-ranking member of the Red Dragon clan. As his clan's top priority is the elimination of the Black Dragon, he aligns himself with Quan Chi and Shang Tsung when they promise to hand over Kano to him for his services. He also defeats Kenshi on their behest. Deception reveals Mavado was killed by Kabal after an unsuccessful attempt on Kabal's life, but he returns in Armageddon, continuing to serve the Red Dragon. Mavado has a minor role in the Mortal Kombat X comic prequel, in which he is killed by Cassie Cage.

Originally named "Malvado", the Spanish word for "evil", Steve Beran conceived a matador-style look for the character, but the idea was nixed due to the belief that it did not fit in with the Mortal Kombat universe. He is the first character in the series to use a physical object for a body-propel special attack, which he performs by shooting two bungee cords into the ground and slingshotting himself feet-first to dropkick his opponent. This attack was incorporated into his "Boot Thrust" Fatality.

Robert Workman of GamePlayBook ranked him eighth in his 2010 selection of the worst MK characters, describing his Fatality as "stupid", but Den of Geek, placed him 39th in their 2015 ranking of the series' 73 characters "for his bungee hook attacks" and taking Kabal's weapons after killing him.

=== Mokap ===
Voiced by: Dusan Brown (Cage Match)

Mokap is a motion capture actor with an extensive martial arts background. He debuted as a hidden character in Deadly Alliance, but has no involvement with the story; his biography follows Johnny Cage's non-canonical ending of a Deadly Alliance film being created. Mokap also has a limited role in the conflict of Armageddon, in which his involvement is said to be by mistake.

Named after the contraction for motion capture, Mokap is based on Midway graphic artist Carlos Pesina, who provided the motion capture work for Deadly Alliance. Pesina admitted it was "pretty flattering" being included in the game, but also remarked it was "weird" seeing Fatalities performed on him.

Mokap is featured in Mortal Kombat Legends: Cage Match, as an African-American man named Charles "Chuck" Golden. In the film, Golden is depicted as Johnny Cage's loyal assistant who idolizes him. He works with Cage to investigate Jennifer's disappearance before the two ally themselves with Ashrah to stop Shinnok from conquering Earthrealm. After they succeed, Golden attempts to follow in Cage's footsteps, eventually becoming his double in video games and nicknames himself "Mokap."

Reception to Mokap has been mostly negative. Den of Geek rated him 55th in their 2015 ranking of the series characters, stating that he "didn't really work well as a comedy character because the game did little to differentiate the characters in terms of personality". In their ranking of the 10 worst characters, ScrewAttack placed Mokap second because "nobody wants to play as a dude with balls on his body".

=== Moloch ===
Voiced by: Bob Ladewig (MK:D)

Moloch is the sub-boss of Deadly Alliance. An Oni demon of immense size and strength, he and Drahmin are hired by Quan Chi to protect him against Scorpion in exchange for freedom from the Netherrealm. After Quan Chi betrays them by leaving them behind, Moloch and Drahmin align themselves with Shang Tsung to help him counter Quan Chi's treachery. They also defeat Scorpion by throwing him into the Soulnado at Shang Tsung's palace. Moloch also appears in the Mortal Kombat X prequel comic, in which Quan Chi has him killed by the revenant Kitana. In reference to his comic death, Quan Chi is seen holding Moloch's severed head during his Mortal Kombat X pre-match introductions.

Designed by Allen Ditzig, Moloch's concept changed little from his finalized design. Den of Geek rated him 21st in their 2015 ranking of the series' 64 characters, praising his sub-boss role and possessing "some utter brutality that hadn't been felt in a Mortal Kombat boss since Kintaro". Bryan Dawson of Prima Games named Moloch in his 2014 selection of the "cheapest" Mortal Kombat characters for his playable version in Armageddon having "a near infinite combo limited only by the size of the stage" and "ridiculous reach with most of his special moves".

=== Nitara ===
Portrayed by: Megan Fox (MK1, voice/model); Cristina Vee (MK1, battle grunts); Mel Jarnson (2021 film)

Nitara is a vampire from the realm of Vaeternus who seeks to destroy the orb that binds her realm to Outworld. As the orb is inside of a lava pit that Cyrax is able to enter, Nitara orchestrates a series of events to force Cyrax into helping her in exchange for passage back to Earthrealm. She ultimately succeeds in destroying the orb with Cyrax's assistance, freeing Vaeternus. Her biography in Armageddon states that Nitara leaves Vaeternus for Edenia in an effort to prevent her species from being exterminated by Ashrah, although this is not established during the game.

In the rebooted timeline of Mortal Kombat 1, Nitara has a minor role in the game's story mode, in which she allies herself with Quan Chi to conquer Earthrealm in order to prevent mass starvation of her people after they overfed on Vaeternus' creatures. An alternate Nitara appears as the second boss in Invasion Mode, where she hails from a timeline conquered by Vaternians that sought to feed on other worlds. After her defeat, Liu Kang recruited another Nitara variant who used her powers for good to cure his allies infected by her evil counterpart.

The character was designed by Luis Mangubat, and a male vampire counterpart was also planned for Deadly Alliance but the developers were unable to add him to the game in time. Megan Fox, who voiced Nitara in MK1, described the character as "evil but she's also good. She's trying to save her people. I really like her. She's a vampire which obviously resonates for whatever reason."

Nitara was played by Mel Jarnson in the 2021 feature film Mortal Kombat, in which she briefly appears as one of Shang Tsung's Outworld champions before she is killed by Kung Lao.

UGO ranked Nitara 46th on their 2012 list of the top fifty series characters. In 2011, Complex named her one of the series' most underrated characters, stating that "Buffy would get her ass handed to her by this chick". However, Fox's voicework in MK1 was criticized by fans as "lifeless and boring".

== Introduced in Mortal Kombat: Deception ==
=== Ashrah ===
Voiced by: Johanna Añonuevo (MK:D, MK:A); Kelly Hu (Cage Match); Susan Eisenberg (MK1)

Ashrah is a demon from the Netherrealm who discovers a magical sword that cleanses her soul when she uses it to kill demons. As having a purified soul will allow her to escape the Netherrealm, Ashrah plots to kill Noob Saibot to complete her redemption. Her Armageddon biography reveals that after leaving the Netherrealm, she is tasked with killing the vampires in Vaeternus. Ashrah returns in Mortal Kombat 1. While hunting down demons to cleanse her soul, she allies herself with Earthrealm's warriors to stop Shang Tsung and Quan Chi, and is welcomed into the Earthrealm by Liu Kang. After the defeat of Titan Shang Tsung, she began studying with the Shaolin Monks before briefly returning to Outworld to rescue Sareena from Quan Chi's control. After Liu Kang assists her in removing Quan Chi's control over her, Sareena joins Ashrah in Earthrealm to form the Order of Light. The pre-fight intros also reveal she and Reptile began dating each other.

Ed Boon commented that the character was commonly misconceived as a female version of Raiden due to her similar outfit and believed she would have the "biggest impact" out of the new characters from Deception. Ashrah was ranked 45th on UGO's 2012 list of the top 50 Mortal Kombat characters. Den of Geek placed her 53rd in their 2015 ranking of the 64 series characters, opining that there was "nothing special about her". Robert Naytor of Hardcore Gaming 101 made note of the character's "modest outfit" in contrast to the franchise's other female characters, but criticized her minor role in the story. Although Kevin Wong of Complex found Ashrah to be "a Raiden knockoff", he praised her "Voodoo Doll" Fatality from Deception.

=== Dairou ===
Voiced by: Josh Schmittstenstein (MK:D)

Dairou is a former guardsman from Orderrealm who was arrested for killing an assailant in anger. After breaking out prison, he became a mercenary who follows a personal code. Following his introduction in Mortal Kombat: Deception, he was slated to appear in Mortal Kombat: Deadly Alliance as an armored samurai wielding a pair of katanas. However, he was cut due to time constraints and his complex design.

Dairou, amalgamated with Havik, appears as a playable character in Mortal Kombat 1.

Dairou makes a non-speaking cameo appearance in Mortal Kombat Legends: Snow Blind as a member of the Black Dragon crime syndicate.

Although Boon had praise for Dairou's appearance, reception to the character has been negative. He was ranked 67th by Den of Geek in their 2015 rating of the series' 73 playable characters, describing him as "unbelievably generic", and Dustin Thomas of Destructoid stated "there really isn't a whole lot to say about him" while ranking him third in his 2014 list of the series' five worst MK characters. Despite this, his "Ribs to the Eyes" Fatality in Deception is regarded as one of the franchise's best.

=== Darrius ===
Voiced by: Steve Jones (MK:D)

Darrius is the leader of a resistance movement in Orderrealm. He seeks to overthrow his realm's government, believing they are too oppressive towards their citizens. To accomplish his goal, Darrius exploits the laws of his realm to manipulate others into joining his movement; his biography implies he had Dairou's family murdered to instigate Dairou's removal from the guardsmen.

Designed by Steve Beran, Darrius was the last new addition to the Deception roster. Beran described Darrius as having "a 'take no B.S.' attitude, like a star athlete who had made his way to fame from a rough upbringing and humble beginnings", while Ed Boon considered him a more "Americanized" fighting game character who had an indescribable "appeal" about him and Herman Sanchez called the character "lean and mean, aggressive, [and with] style." According to Beran, the character's look was inspired by 1960s and '70s comic book art, with his final appearance "intended to be a mixture of those elements fused with a sleek modern approach". His alternate costume was a homage to actor Jim Kelly. Lead storyteller John Vogel expressed his desire to see Darrius in future MK installments, although he has not reappeared since Armageddon. He eventually made his return in Mortal Kombat 1 as a kameo fighter with appearances in the story mode.

Darrius was rated 44th in the 2015 ranking of the series' 73 player characters by Gavin Jasper of Den of Geek, who found him "worth revisiting down the line". Conversely, ScrewAttack named Darrius the sixth worst Mortal Kombat character, calling him a "knock-off" of the Marvel Comics hero Blade.

=== Havik ===
Voiced by: Ryan Rosenberg (MK:D, MK:A); Jacob Craner (MK1)

Havik is a denizen of Chaosrealm who, like its other inhabitants, seeks to spread disorder. In pursuit of this goal, he pits Earthrealm and Outworld's warriors against Onaga, rescues Kabal, and convinces him to reform the Black Dragon. Following his introduction in Deception, Havik makes subsequent appearances in Mortal Kombat: Armageddon and DC Comics' Mortal Kombat X: Blood Ties.

Two incarnations of Havik appear in Mortal Kombat 1. The first, who bears elements of Dairou, makes a minor appearance in the story mode as a former inhabitant of Orderrealm who disagrees with their laws and seeks to destroy it. In his arcade mode ending, he succeeds in destroying Orderrealm's capital, Seido, with Rain's help. The second, a Titan, makes a cameo appearance in the story mode, and serves as the final boss of the Khaos Reigns DLC.

Havik, originally named "Skab", was designed by Steve Beran as an alternate outfit for Noob Saibot before being given a storyline of his own. Ed Boon said that Havik was envisioned as a "decaying" character whose specials would look "disturbing" due to often featuring his limbs breaking.

Havik is generally regarded as the best character introduced in Deception. Dustin Thomas of Destructoid called him "the only new character in Deception worthy of being a Mortal Kombat character". Hardcore Gaming 101 described Havik as "probably the least lamest of the newcomers in Deception, even though that's not saying much". Ranking him 30th in their 2015 rating of the series' 73 characters, Den of Geek said, "While the whole Orderrealm/Chaosrealm subplot never quite caught on, Havik is strong enough to exist on his own."

=== Hotaru ===
Voiced by: Chase Ashbaker (MK:D)

Hotaru is a high-ranking guardsman in Orderrealm. Although not inherently evil, he aligns himself with Onaga due to Onaga's reputation for preserving order. As part of his alignment, Hotaru pursues Sub-Zero for killing many of Onaga's Tarkatan warriors. In turn, Hotaru is pursued by Dairou, who received a contract to assassinate him. He is depicted being killed by Dairou, Darrius, and Kenshi in their respective endings, but the 2011 reboot reveals that his death occurred during the final battle of Armageddon.

The character was conceived as a foil to Havik. His name is the Japanese word for firefly, which serves as the motif for his costume that was designed by Jennifer Hedrick.

Hotaru was ranked 43rd on UGO's 2012 list of the top 50 Mortal Kombat characters. Ranking him 60th in their 2015 rating of the series' 73 characters, Den of Geek remarked that "order tends to be the more boring [compared to chaos], but Hotaru has just enough of a cool factor". Robert Workman of GamePlayBook rated Hotaru 10th in his selection of the worst series characters for his using lava as a weapon and "stealing" Liu Kang's Bicycle Kick for one of his special moves.

=== Kira ===
Voiced by: Christine Rios (MK:A); Courtenay Taylor (Snow Blind)

Kira is a member of the Black Dragon clan who possesses the abilities of Kano and Sonya Blade. She also wields the same daggers as Kano. Formerly an arms dealer, she becomes the first recruit of Kabal's new clan in Deception. Early into the Konquest mode of MK: Armageddon, Kira is seen guarding a bridge alongside Kobra. Kira, however, abandons Kobra during his battle with Taven.

John Vogel described Kira as the "most disciplined" of the Black Dragons, while Jay Biondo called her "the Fatal Attraction character". Describing her as an "evil Sonya Blade" who was "a bit easier to take seriously" than Kobra, Den of Geek placed Kira 32nd in their 2015 ranking of the franchise's 64 player characters. Her storyline as an arms dealer who disguised herself as a man was ranked fourth by John Harty of WhatCulture in his 2015 selection of the series' ten "Most Badass Backstories", calling it "a concept that speaks to a person having some serious balls".

=== Kobra ===
Voiced by: Alex Brandon (MK:A); Yuri Lowenthal (Snow Blind)

Kobra is a martial artist who serves the Black Dragon clan. Once a disciplined fighter, he turns criminal after he starts using his training to kill others. His bloodlust catches the attention of Kabal, who makes him the second recruit of his clan in Deception. Kobra appears as Taven's first opponent in the Konquest mode of Armageddon, in which he unsuccessfully attempts to prevent Taven from crossing a bridge.

Kobra was given the placeholder name of "Ben Masters" while Deception was in production, due to his physical resemblance to Street Fighter character Ken Masters. Ed Boon described Kobra in Deception as "the simple character that everybody can pick up and play" with easy-to-execute special moves.

In the 2022 animated film Mortal Kombat Legends: Snow Blind, Kobra is one of Kano's main Black Dragon henchmen.

GamePlayBook placed Kobra sixth in their 2010 listing of the 10 worst Mortal Kombat characters, unfavorably comparing him to Ken. Den of Geek rated Kobra 35th in their 2015 ranking of the 64 series characters, calling him an "evil Johnny Cage".

=== Onaga ===
Voiced by: Nigel Casey (MK:D, MK:A)

Onaga is the final boss of Deception. Also known as the Dragon King, he was the emperor of Outworld until he was poisoned by Shao Kahn. Once resurrected, Onaga derives his power from the Kamidogu, six mystical relics that contain the essence of each main realm. Unbeknownst to Onaga, however, he is being manipulated by the One Being into unmaking reality through the Kamidogu. The Konquest mode of Deception reveals how he manipulated Shujinko into collecting the Kamidogu for him under the identity of his avatar Damashi. He is ultimately defeated by Shujinko, but returns in Armageddon, in which he begrudgingly enters an alliance with Shao Kahn and other major villains to destroy Blaze. Onaga does not appear in the rebooted timeline, although he is occasionally referenced. In Mortal Kombat 1's new timeline, Onaga was defeated and captured centuries ago by General Shao's ancestors, and General Shao tasks Reiko with taming him to use as a weapon against Outworld's Royal Court.

The character was ranked 39th on UGO's 2012 list of the top 50 Mortal Kombat fighters.

=== Shujinko ===
Voiced by: Max Crawford (MK:D, MK:A)

Shujinko is a veteran adventurer with the ability to copy the powers of his opponents. He serves as the protagonist of Deception's Konquest mode, which depicts how he was deceived into collecting the six mystical Kamidogu for Onaga. Upon learning of the deception, Shujinko seeks redemption by using the power he received from Onaga to defeat him. Shujinko emerges victorious by destroying the Kamidogu, but believing that he has not redeemed himself, he plots to destroy Onaga and the other villains during the events of MK: Armageddon. He appears in the Mortal Kombat X prequel comic, where he guards Chaosrealm's Kamidogu but becomes possessed by Havik. He also appears in Cassie Cage's ending in the Mortal Kombat X game, where he is defeated by Cassie after Raiden reported him stealing souls. In Mortal Kombat 1, he appears as an assist-based Kameo fighter. The new timeline's version also appears in Kung Lao's ending, where he trains under him. Due to Kung Lao not teaching him humility, he becomes a threat to the realms. After Liu Kang erases his memory, Kung Lao agrees to train him again but with Raiden at his side.

Ed Boon deemed Shujinko the series' "next-generation Liu Kang", but the character was not well received. Describing him as "one of the most gullible, susceptible dumbasses in video games", Den of Geek placed Shujinko 65th in their 2015 ranking of the series' 73 playable characters. ScrewAttack ranked Shujinko the eighth worst Mortal Kombat character for being an "older and boring" Liu Kang. Bryan Dawson of Prima Games named him one of the series' "cheapest" characters due to his moveset of other fighters' special attacks.

== Introduced in Mortal Kombat: Armageddon ==
=== Daegon ===
Voiced by: Tom Taylorson (MK:A)

Daegon is the younger of the brothers tasked with preventing Armageddon. Due to being awoken prematurely from his incubation, however, he appears physically older than Taven. The premature awakening causes Daegon to become unbalanced, resulting in him killing his parents and forming the Red Dragon clan. When Taven is properly awoken during the events of Armageddon, Daegon fights him for the right to face Blaze, but he is defeated by his older brother. Along with a background cameo in the 2011 reboot, he appears in the Mortal Kombat X prequel comic, which establishes him as the killer of Takeda's mother.

The character was initially called "Doug" during the production of Armageddon as the developers had difficulty finding a name for him. Daegon finished 56th in Den of Geek's 2015 ranking of the series' 73 characters. He was criticized by Hardcore Gaming 101, who opined that his in-development name was "probably the most interesting thing about him".

=== Taven ===
Voiced by: Shaun Himmerick (MK:A)

Taven is the older of the brothers tasked with preventing Armageddon. He serves as the protagonist of Armageddon's training mode, which depicts his quest to save the realms by claiming Blaze's power. The mode ends with Taven defeating Blaze, but his victory does not stop the final battle as it instead causes the other warriors to become more powerful. The 2011 reboot, however, establishes Shao Kahn claiming Blaze's power, implying Taven was defeated by Blaze. Taven has not been featured in the storyline of the rebooted timeline, although he has appeared in non-canonical endings.

Due to difficulty in naming the character, Taven was originally called "Bob" until his final name was determined. Ed Boon revealed that he initially opposed Taven's final name before it made "perfect sense" to him. Reception to Taven was mostly negative; Hardcore Gaming 101 called him "utterly generic". Destructoid named him the series' second-worst fighter, describing him as "the most bland character in MK history". Similar criticism was shared by Den of Geek in their 2015 ranking of the series' 73 playable characters, which placed him 58th and opined "Taven's generic design didn't do him any favors" when Armageddon was "based around including every single playable Mortal Kombat character".

== Introduced in Mortal Kombat vs. DC Universe ==
=== Dark Kahn ===
Voiced by: Perry Brown and Patrick Seitz

Dark Kahn is the final boss of Mortal Kombat vs. DC Universe. He is an amalgamation of Shao Kahn and DC Comics supervillain Darkseid, created through the accidental merging of their universes. Deriving his power from conflict, he attempts to fully merge the universes by manipulating the Mortal Kombat and DC warriors into fighting each other. Dark Kahn is ultimately defeated by Raiden and Superman, who manage to overcome his manipulation. Following Dark Kahn's destruction, Shao Kahn and Darkseid become trapped in their counterparts' universe; Darkseid is sent to the Netherrealm, while Shao Kahn is imprisoned in the Phantom Zone.

== Introduced in Mortal Kombat (2011) ==
=== Skarlet ===
Voiced by: Beata Poźniak

Skarlet is a warrior created by Shao Kahn using sorcery and the blood of countless warriors. She debuts in the 2011 series reboot, where her purpose is to discern Quan Chi's true reason for attending the Mortal Kombat tournament. In Mortal Kombat 11, her background is changed to that as an orphan adopted by Shao Kahn to learn blood magic upon her eventual transformation into an imperial bodyguard and assassin. Skarlet uses kodachi swords and kunai knives as well as her power to turn into, and absorb the blood of her victims in addition to being able to manipulate her victim's blood.

Similar to the Ermac rumors in the first Mortal Kombat, Skarlet originated as a nonexistent character in Mortal Kombat II due to false reports of a glitch nicknamed "Scarlet" by players in which the palette swaps of either Kitana or Mileena would turn red. Nearly two decades after the rumors originated, she was announced as one of the 2011 reboot's first downloadable (DLC) playable characters. She plays a minor role in DC Comics' 2015 Mortal Kombat X comic series set before the events of the game, but does not appear in the game itself. Skarlet has been noted by gaming media outlets for the graphic nature of her character and her Fatalities.

== Introduced in Mortal Kombat X ==
=== D'Vorah ===
Voiced by: Kelly Hu (MKX, MK11), Debra Wilson (Battle of the Realms)

D'Vorah is a Kytinn, a humanoid race with insect/arachnid traits. Her name is derived from the Hebrew word for bee. She is first seen serving Kotal Kahn in Mortal Kombat X, but is secretly in allegiance with Shinnok, which results in her being defeated by Cassie Cage. In Mortal Kombat 11, D'Vorah joins Kronika's efforts in restarting the timeline. Although she kills the present version of Scorpion, she is forced to retreat after his past counterpart injures her; her subsequent fate is unknown.

D'Vorah appears in the 2021 animated film Mortal Kombat Legends: Battle of the Realms, voiced by Debra Wilson.

The character has received a polarizing reception. Melody MacReady of Screen Rant noted that while D'Vorah is praised for her design, she has generated controversy for killing popular characters such as Baraka, Mileena, and Scorpion in the games' storyline. She ranked 25th in Den of Geek's 2015 rating of the series' 73 playable characters, which called her "a great new addition to the roster" and lauded that she was "filled with all sorts of creepy surprises".

=== Erron Black ===
Voiced by: Troy Baker

Erron Black is a mercenary from Earthrealm, but in the service of Outworld. Depicted as a 19th-century gunfighter from the Old West, his backstory reveals that his body's aging was slowed by Shang Tsung in exchange for murdering an unidentified Earthrealm warrior. As a result, he utilizes 19th century weaponry. He serves Kotal Kahn in Mortal Kombat X, which puts him into conflict with Earthrealm's warriors. Mortal Kombat 11 features a past version of Erron Black who both serves Shao Kahn and is a member of the Black Dragon, while his present counterpart assists Kitana in defeating Shao Kahn's forces.

Black appears in the 2022 animated film Mortal Kombat Legends: Snow Blind as one of Kano's Black Dragon henchmen.

The character placed 10th in Den of Geek's rating of the series' 73 playable characters in 2015, the highest of any fighter not introduced in the first three games, which described him as "the Boba Fett of Mortal Kombat".

=== Ferra/Torr ===
Voiced by: Tara Strong (Ferra); Fred Tatasciore (Torr)

Ferra and Torr are a duo belonging to an Outworld symbiotic species. Through their relationship, the diminutive Ferra rides the massive Torr into battle, while Torr serves as their enforcer. During gameplay, the player controls Torr, with Ferra utilized for special attacks; as such, fatalities and brutalities are performed directly on Torr. Their ending in Mortal Kombat X establishes Ferra is a juvenile who will be mounted by a rider when she reaches maturity and Torr will die without her. In the story mode of Mortal Kombat X, Ferra and Torr serve Kotal Kahn, which leads to them fighting Earthrealm's warriors; they are ultimately incapacitated by Sub-Zero.

Ebenezer Samuel of the New York Daily News called Ferra and Torr a "highlight" of the game, with their in-gameplay mannerisms "distracting enough to take your eye off the battle, and quirky enough that it's worth watching." They ranked 39th in the ranking of the series characters by Den of Geek, who praised them as "the most original new race the series has introduced in years".

=== Jacqui Briggs ===
Voiced by: Danielle Nicolet (MKX); Megalyn Echikunwoke (MK11)

Jacqueline Sonya "Jacqui" Briggs is a Special Forces operative who uses a pair of electronic gauntlets as her primary weapon. She is the daughter of Jax Briggs. Best friend of Cassie Cage, she debuts in Mortal Kombat X as a member of Cassie Cage's unit, with whom she helps defeat the threatening forces of Outworld and the Netherrealm. She also becomes the love interest to Takeda. In Mortal Kombat 11, Jacqui and the past version of her father are forced to face the present version of Jax when he aligns himself with Kronika. After the present version realizes his mistakes, she fights alongside both versions of her father in the battle against Kronika's forces. In Mortal Kombat 1, Jacqui is not present in the new timeline as Jax had not married yet, but appears in the final battle as one of Shang Tsung's minions summoned to oppose Liu Kang.

Den of Geek ranked Jacqui 47th in their ranking of the 73 series characters, praising her for being "fun to play as" while finding that "she doesn't stand out nearly enough". Ikhtear Shahrukh of The Daily Star opined that Jacqui "fit[s] into typical generic fighter game character stereotypes instead of being Mortal Kombat material".

=== Kotal Kahn ===
Voiced by: Phil LaMarr

Kotal Kahn is the emperor of Outworld in Mortal Kombat X and Mortal Kombat 11. He is an Osh-Tekk, an Aztec-inspired species whose powers originate from the sun, and wields a macuahuitl as his primary weapon. Embroiled in a civil war against Mileena in Mortal Kombat X, he receives support from the Earthrealm warriors, but turns against them due to D'Vorah's deception. Kotal Kahn later leads an invasion of Earthrealm, which is driven back by the Lin Kuei. In Mortal Kombat 11, his rule is threatened by the return of Shao Kahn. After Shao Kahn cripples him, he names Kitana the new ruler of Outworld. He does not appear during the battle against Kronika in the original story mode, but Aftermath sees him participate after his injures heal; he is killed by Shao Kahn in a surprise attack. Although he does not physically appear in Mortal Kombat 1, he is mentioned to have been defeated off screen by Raiden as part of the tournament.

The character was ranked 15th on Den of Geek's list of Mortal Kombat characters, which compared him to Black Adam and Namor as an "honorable" emperor who "will do anything to protect his planetary kingdom".

=== Takeda Takahashi ===
Voiced by: Parry Shen

Takeda is the son of Kenshi and a member of the Shirai Ryu clan and Cassie Cage's Special Forces unit whose primary weapon is a pair of bladed whips. Following his mother's murder, Takeda was raised and trained by Hanzo Hasashi as Kenshi wanted him to be properly prepared to avenge her. First appearing in Mortal Kombat X, Takeda assists Cage in combatting Outworld and Netherrealm forces, forming a relationship with teammate Jacqui Briggs in the process. In Mortal Kombat 11, he makes cameo appearances in Cassie Cage, Shao Kahn, and Cetrion's arcade mode endings and is stated to be engaged to Briggs in the story mode.

Three incarnations of Takeda appear in Mortal Kombat 1. The first, an NPC, makes a non-speaking cameo appearance in the story mode as an evil alternate timeline variant summoned to aid Titan Shang Tsung, only to be killed by Titan Kitana. The second, a downloadable playable character, is Kenshi's cousin instead of his son. Additionally, he previously worked for the Yakuza, who sent him to kill Kenshi for his betrayal. After being injured and put into the Shirai Ryu's care, Takeda temporarily joins them before leaving to dismantle the Yakuza. In his arcade mode ending, he discovers the Yakuza answer to a more powerful crime syndicate called the Red Dragon and works to dismantle them instead. The third, also an NPC, appears in the Khaos Reigns DLC as a variant from Titan Havik's timeline and a member of his army.

Takeda was ranked 36th in Den of Geek's list of Mortal Kombat characters, which found that he "works best as an accessory to Scorpion, finally giving him some semblance of family and helping to give him closure".

=== Triborg ===
Voiced by: Vic Chao

Triborg is a cybernetic warrior created from the consciousnesses of Sektor, Cyrax, Smoke, and Sub-Zero. As a result, he is able to replicate the abilities of each. Depending on the variation selected by the player, Triborg will appear as one of the Lin Kuei cyborgs and utilize his special moves during gameplay. He debuted as a downloadable character in Mortal Kombat X, where his backstory establishes that he seeks to destroy all organic life. However, he has no involvement in the storyline of the game. Triborg was excluded from the Den of Geek ranking of the series' fighters, as writer Gavin Jasper found him to be "a Voltron of existing characters".

== Introduced in Mortal Kombat 11 ==
=== Cetrion ===
Voiced by: Mary Elizabeth McGlynn

Cetrion is the Elder Goddess of life and virtue. She utilizes nature and the elements as her primary powers. As the daughter of Kronika and sister of Shinnok, Cetrion is intended to balance the darkness represented by her brother. Despite her benevolent appearance, however, she maintains loyalty to Kronika. This loyalty leads to Cetrion allowing Kronika to absorb her essence in both the original story mode of Mortal Kombat 11 and the Aftermath expansion.

Ranking her 38th in his list of the series' characters, Gavin Jasper of Den of Geek called Cetrion "more nightmarish" than Shinnok.

=== Geras ===
Voiced by: Dave B. Mitchell (MK11); Phil LaMarr (MK1)

Geras is an artificial construct created by Kronika to serve as her primary enforcer. Named after the Greek deity of old age, his powers are based around manipulating sand and time. The story mode of Mortal Kombat 11 establishes that he also possesses regenerative abilities, effectively rendering him immortal. As the Earthrealm heroes are unable to kill him, Raiden defeats Geras by throwing him into Netherrealm's bottomless Sea of Blood. The Aftermath expansion, however, depicts Geras being incapacitated by Shao Kahn, despite his immortality powers. In Mortal Kombat 1, Liu Kang makes Geras his advisor and entrusts him with monitoring the new timeline.

Gavin Jasper of Den of Geek ranked Geras 20th in his list of the series' characters, with praise for his time manipulation powers and calling his ability to alter the game's match timer "such a wonderful, brilliant asshole move".

=== Kollector ===
Voiced by: Andrew Morgado

Kollector is a Naknadan, a six-armed species in Outworld. His multiple arms allow him to utilize a wide array of weaponry, including a lantern, chain mace, bag bomb, and vials of fire. As implied by his name, he served as tribute collector for Shao Kahn until the emperor's death. When Shao Kahn returns in the story mode of Mortal Kombat 11, Kollector rejoins his forces, but is defeated by Kitana. In the Aftermath expansion, he is the first to notice the time-displaced Shang Tsung, Fujin, and Nightwolf arrive in Outworld, leading to him being defeated by the lattermost. Kollector appears as a cameo in Mortal Kombat 1 in the game's Invasions mode where he acts as a shopkeeper players can purchase items from.

Ranked 45th in his list of the series' characters, Gavin Jasper of Den of Geek spoke highly of the Kollector's animation and fighting style, but found that "he showed up a little too late to the party".

=== Kronika ===
Voiced by: Jennifer Hale

Kronika is the final boss of Mortal Kombat 11. She is a Titan, a deity predating the Elder Gods, and responsible for maintaining the universe's timeline. As such, her powers center around space and time manipulation. Mortal Kombat 11's story mode depicts her efforts to maintain the conflict between good and evil by restarting the timeline, while also removing Raiden from history. Although Kronika succeeds in bringing the timeline back to its beginning, she is destroyed by Fire God Liu Kang, who becomes the new keeper of time. Kronika returns in the Aftermath expansion when Shang Tsung goes back in time to retrieve her crown, which is required to control the timeline. She is ultimately erased from existence by Shang Tsung, while either Shang Tsung or Liu Kang becomes the keeper of time, depending on who the player selects in the battle between them. However, Mortal Kombat 1 reveals the fight over the possession of Hourglass between both Liu Kang and Shang Tsung ripped apart the fabric of reality, creating a multiverse where the two rivals, alongside their allies and enemies, each become victors and Time Keeper Titans of their respective new timelines.

In Mortal Kombat 1, Titan Shang Tsung disguises himself as Kronika and calls himself "Damashi" when visiting Liu Kang's new timeline to mentor his Outworlder counterpart, alongside that timeline's Quan Chi, who is also an Outworlder, into becoming the powerful sorcerers they were in previous timelines. In truth, Titan Shang Tsung manipulates Liu Kang timeline's Deadly Alliance, Shao and later Bi-Han into becoming villains like in previous timelines, then dispose of them alongside all lives in that timeline before merging it with his. It is revealed that the power Kronika possessed, combined with her obsession to find perfect balance drove her insane, and she was responsible for the creation of the Deadly Alliance, forging the destinies of Shang Tsung and Quan Chi as powerful sorcerers, something that would later backfire for not only Kronika, but for the realms entirely.

Originally developed as a male deity, Kronika is noted as the first female boss in the Mortal Kombat franchise. She was ranked 23rd in the Den of Geek's series characters list, the second-highest final boss behind Shao Kahn, which praised her as "a great major villain" who was "scary not because of her pure might, but because of her affronting divinity".

== Introduced in Mortal Kombat 1 ==
=== Floyd ===
Voiced by: Alan Lee

Floyd is a Pink-colored ninja who appears as an unplayable secret boss in Mortal Kombat 1. His color scheme is a direct reference to the band Pink Floyd. Similar to Reptile in the original Mortal Kombat title, as well both Smoke and Noob Saibot in Mortal Kombat II, he is fought after completing various challenges and utilizes moves from all of the other male ninjas, much like Chameleon.

=== Janet Cage ===
Voiced by: Courtenay Taylor

Debuting as a non-playable Kameo Fighter in Mortal Kombat 1, Janet Cage is a gender-flipped variant of Johnny Cage from an unknown timeline that Liu Kang handpicked in the second Battle of Armageddon.

=== Madam Bo ===
Voiced by: Kelly Hu

Originally debuting as a supporting character in the story mode of Mortal Kombat 1, Madam Bo operates a tea house in Raiden and Kung Lao's hometown of Fengjian and has trained them in martial arts since they were kids. Her name and role in the story heavily imply that she is the new version of Bo' Rai Cho in Liu Kang's new timeline. When she believes that both of them are ready to become champions of Earthrealm, she assists Sub-Zero, Scorpion, and Smoke in testing them by playing dead after being thrown off the balcony by Smoke to get them to fight the Lin Kuei members. Madam Bo reappears at the end of the story mode, serving food and tea to Liu Kang, Johnny Cage, Kenshi, Raiden, and Kung Lao, before leaving the latter four with the bill. In various pre-fight dialogues, it is revealed that Madam Bo used to be a member of the Lin Kuei, and that she and Longwei, the Lin Kuei's master armorer, are Sektor's parents. In the Khaos Reigns DLC, she appears as a non-playable Kameo fighter.

== Other ==
=== Belokk ===
Belokk was originally slated for Mortal Kombat Gold but was cut from the final release. He was created by Eurocom and, according to Ed Boon, was removed from the game as the developers did not have time to complete him. Nevertheless, Eurocom accidentally sent information about the game with Belokk in it to Game Informer, and as a result, six screenshots of him were leaked to the public in a preview, upon special request.

== Guest characters ==
Guest characters from various media franchises have appeared in subsequent Mortal Kombat games following the 2008 crossover title Mortal Kombat vs. DC Universe.

= Playable in the base roster of the game

= Playable in later iterations of the game

= Appears as a non-playable opponent

Character
Character	MKvs.DCU	MK9	MKX	MK11	MK1
Batman	Playable				
Shazam	Playable				
Catwoman	Playable				
Deathstroke	Playable				
Darkseid	Playable				
The Flash	Playable				
Green Lantern	Playable				
Joker	Playable			Playable^{DLC}	
Lex Luthor	Playable				
Superman	Playable				
Wonder Woman	Playable				
Dark Kahn	Boss				
Kratos		Playable^{PS3}			
Freddy Krueger		Playable^{DLC}			
Jason Voorhees			Playable^{DLC}		
Predator			Playable^{DLC}		
Alien			Playable^{DLC}		
Leatherface			Playable^{DLC}		
Spawn				Playable^{DLC}	
Terminator				Playable^{DLC}	
RoboCop				Playable^{DLC}	
John Rambo				Playable^{DLC}	
Omni-Man					Playable^{DLC}
Peacemaker					Playable^{DLC}
Homelander					Playable^{DLC}
Ghostface					Playable^{DLC}
T-1000					Playable^{DLC}
Conan the Barbarian					Playable^{DLC}
