= Mortal Kombat Legends: Cage Match =

2023 direct-to-video animated movie

- Official DVD/Blu-ray cover
- Directed by: Ethan Spaulding
- Screenplay by: Jeremy Adams
- Based on: Mortal Kombat by Ed Boon & John Tobias
- Produced by: Rick Morales
- Starring: Joel McHale; Jennifer Grey; Gilbert Gottfried; Kelly Hu; Dusan Brown
- Production companies: Warner Bros. Animation; Studio IAM
- Distributed by: Warner Bros. Home Entertainment
- Release date: October 17, 2023
- Running time: 80 minutes
- Country: United States
- Language: English

Mortal Kombat Legends: Cage Match is a 2023 American adult animated martial arts film based on the Mortal Kombat franchise, produced by Warner Bros. Animation and animated by Studio IAM. A prequel and the fourth installment in the Mortal Kombat Legends film series, it serves as an origin story for Johnny Cage, focusing on his attempt to save his co-star Jennifer Grey while fighting a secret society that plots the destruction of Earthrealm. The film was released direct-to-video on October 17, 2023. It received positive reviews from critics.

== Plot ==
Around Christmas in the 1980s, action star and martial artist Johnny Cage is attempting to make his big break with his next movie, Ninja Mime. The film's producer, Brian Van Jones, expresses concerns over the disappearance of his costar, Jennifer Grey, prompting him to seek her out alongside his loyal assistant, Chuck Golden. When he arrives at her mansion, Cage finds two women named Ashrah and Kia battling each other over a mysterious scroll. He ends up getting caught in their fight, and the three escape before Jennifer's house explodes from a planted bomb.

As Ashrah and Kia continue their fight on the highway, Cage hijacks a tour bus to pursue them, which kills Kia after Ashrah ejects her from her car. Cage manages to retrieve the scroll from Ashrah with Golden's help. The two find that it is a star map of Los Angeles with Greek text on the back. Meanwhile, Ashrah returns to the White Lotus Society to report to Lord Raiden, who encourages her to enlist Cage's help for the coming battles ahead.

On his way to report his and Golden's findings to the police, Cage is sidetracked by his agent, David Doubldy, who claims that "The Big Man" wants to hire him for a superhero film. However, when he visits his agent's office, Doubldy demands the scroll and reveals that a secret Hollywood club meeting at the Magical Mansion is interested in him. The two fight, during which Cage discovers that Doubldy is actually a demon and kills him in self-defense. With the police refusing to help, Cage and Golden decide to look into the mystery themselves and head to the Magical Mansion. While Golden deciphers the scroll, Cage attends the party and is invited as a guest by one of the club's attendees named Jataaka, who takes him under the mansion to cut off communication with Golden.

Before Jataaka can take him further underground, the two are intercepted by Ashrah, who tells Cage that Jataaka and Kia were two of three assassins aligned with the Brotherhood of Shadows, a cult intent on summoning their god, Shinnok, to conquer Earthrealm. Cage and Ashrah are able to defeat Jataaka with the help of Golden, who informs them that the Brotherhood intends to use the spell on the scroll and the "blood of a god" below the Oriental Theatre to open a gate to the Netherrealm. Before they can destroy the scroll, they are attacked and captured by the third assassin, Jennifer.

Jennifer reveals to Cage that she is a demon named Sareena and was cut off from the Netherrealm before getting sent to Earthrealm decades ago. Upon finding out that Cage possessed the blood of the gods needed to open a portal to her home, she and other demons helped set up his film career and Ninja Mime so that he could eventually be used as a sacrifice to summon her master, Shinnok. Ashrah and Golden escape their captivity from the director, during which Golden finds out that Ashrah is a demon formerly affiliated with the Brotherhood now focused on repenting her sins and becoming human.

Ashrah and Golden manage to rescue Cage, but not before Sareena uses his blood to create the portal to the Netherrealm, bringing Shinnok to Earthrealm. Golden suggests that they get Shinnok back through the rift and then cast the spell from the scroll to trap him back in the Netherrealm. Cage fights Shinnok in the streets near the Oriental Theatre while Golden and Ashrah face off against Jones and Sareena, who unleash their true demonic forms. Golden manages to knock Jones back into the portal before giving Ashrah back her sword that she uses to kill Sareena. With his fans and onlookers cheering him on, Cage unleashes his mystical powers that allow him to fight on par with Shinnok and manages to knock the fallen Elder God back into the portal. Golden casts the spell to close the portal, cutting off access for Shinnok and the other demons of the Netherrealm. Cage is celebrated as a hero by the public and shares a kiss with Ashrah.

Golden attempts to follow in Cage's footsteps by taking martial arts classes but eventually ends up becoming his stunt double in video games and nicknames himself "Mokap." Despite her strong feelings towards Cage, Ashrah leaves to continue her quest to slay demons and become human. Cage becomes a successful action star thanks to the strong performance of Ninja Mime and its sequels, but his career eventually falls apart. Cage is later seen packing his car and preparing to shoot his new film on a remote island.

== Voice cast ==
- Joel McHale as Johnny Cage
- Jennifer Grey as Herself / Sareena
- Dusan Brown as Chuck Golden / Mokap
- Grey DeLisle as Kia, Little Boy, Old Woman
- Robin Atkin Downes as Shinnok
- Zehra Fazal as Jataaka
- Gilbert Gottfried as David Doubldy
- Kelly Hu as Ashrah
- Matthew Yang King as Concierge, Costumed Man
- Phil LaMarr as Brian Van Jones
- Matthew Mercer as Ethan, Bully
- Dave B. Mitchell as Raiden, Bus Driver
- Armen Taylor as Master Boyd, Mugger

== Production ==
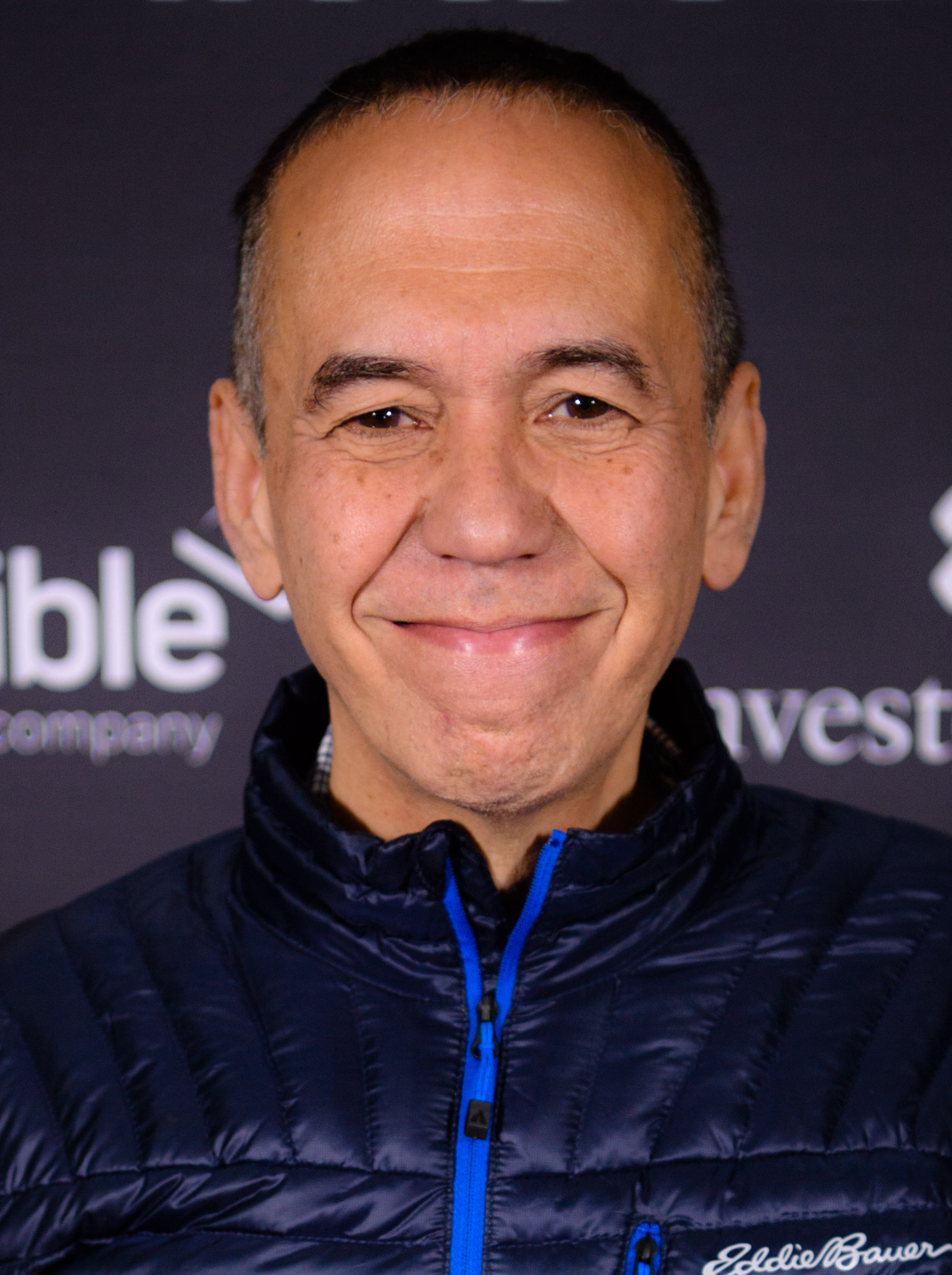
The film was dedicated to comedian Gilbert Gottfried, as Cage Match served as his final posthumous credit following his death in April 2022.

During promotion for Mortal Kombat Legends: Snow Blind at New York Comic Con in October 2022, a fourth installment in the Legends series titled Cage Match was announced, where actor Joel McHale was announced to be reprising his role as Johnny Cage. In an interview in October 2022, Jeremy Adams revealed that he is writing the film. In June 2023, IGN announced the film's cast and details, with actress Jennifer Grey and Gilbert Gottfried among the names of the cast.

== Reception ==
=== Critical response ===
Sam Stone of Comic Book Resources called the film "a goofy love letter to the '80s" and added, "There are moments throughout Cage Match where the audience may have to remind themselves that they're watching a Mortal Kombat movie because it really doesn't feel like a tangential story for the franchise and more of an off-kilter solo spinoff for Johnny Cage." Matt Donato of IGN rated the film a 6 out of 10, commenting, "Cage Match is more interested in Johnny slinging one-liners laced with '80s pop culture references than it is replicating gameplay. It's a contained Mortal Kombat movie that feels underwhelming as a result, until a third act where Johnny squares off against Shinnok up and down Hollywood Boulevard. ... It seems like Cage Match is trying to lampoon cheesy action movies, but instead winds up being one itself." Douglas Davidson of Elements of Madness said "delivering a delightful mystery that starts soft and ends with a series of blood-soaked fatalities. As long as that's all you're looking for, you're going to have a good time."
