= Mortal Kombat Legends: Snow Blind =

- Official DVD/Blu-ray cover
- Directed by: Rick Morales
- Screenplay by: Jeremy Adams
- Based on: Mortal Kombat by Ed Boon & John Tobias
- Produced by: Jim Krieg; Rick Morales
- Starring: Manny Jacinto; David Wenham; Ron Yuan; Keith Silverstein; Courtenay Taylor; Yuri Lowenthal; Artt Butler; Imari Williams
- Edited by: Robert Ehrenreich
- Music by: John Jennings Boyd; Eric V. Hachikian
- Production companies: Warner Bros. Animation; Digital eMation
- Distributed by: Warner Bros. Home Entertainment
- Release date: October 9, 2022
- Running time: 82 minutes
- Countries: United States; South Korea
- Language: English

Mortal Kombat Legends: Snow Blind is a 2022 adult animated martial arts film based on the Mortal Kombat franchise, directed by Rick Morales and written by Jeremy Adams, produced by Warner Bros. Animation and animated by South Korean studio Digital eMation. Snow Blind was released direct-to-video on October 11, 2022, and is the third installment in the Mortal Kombat Legends film series. The film borrows elements from the plot of Mortal Kombat: Deadly Alliance, Mortal Kombat: Deception and Mortal Kombat 11, and is a standalone sequel to Mortal Kombat Legends: Battle of the Realms (2021). It received mixed-to-positive reviews.

A prequel, Mortal Kombat Legends: Cage Match, was released in 2023.

== Plot ==
Decades after Shao Kahn's defeat in Mortal Kombat, Earthrealm has been attacked by undead revenants and become a wasteland of isolated cities. The Black Dragon clan — Kira, Kobra, Ferra/Torr, Drahmin, Kabal, Erron Black, No Face, Dairou, Tremor, and Jarek, along with an aged Shang Tsung — has annexed these cities, with their leader Kano declaring himself king.

Meanwhile, an aged Kuai Liang has abandoned the title of Sub-Zero and lives a farmer's life. Kabal, Kira, and Kobra assault him and steal his supplies before entering an untouched city that is the home of the brash young warrior Kenshi. He defeats the trio in combat but spares their lives, and they flee but later return to the city with fellow clansman Tremor and Shang Tsung in tow. When Kenshi announces himself by his full name, his surname Takahashi catches Shang Tsung's attention, and after Kenshi is defeated by Tremor, he intervenes and prevents his execution.

Under the alias of "Song", he tells Kenshi of a powerful sword called "Sento" that could be used to defeat the Black Dragon. Kenshi is lured to a desert where the Well of Souls is located, and when he opens it, energy surges from the well and blinds Kenshi, while Shang Tsung absorbs it and is rejuvenated with a younger form, after which he throws Kenshi into the well and leaves him to die. However, Kenshi hears the mystic sword Sento speaking to him telepathically; he takes the weapon and frees himself from the well.

Shang Tsung later attacks Kano, killing several of his Black Dragon henchmen before being slain himself by Kano after he is unable to consume his soul due to Kano being cybernetic, but not before Kano reveals he had predicted Shang Tsung's betrayal, hinting at a grander design to his rule.

Kuai Liang finds Kenshi wandering the desert and takes him in, then trains Kenshi by enhancing his other senses. He reveals that he had faced the wave of the revenants and, in a desperate attempt to end the conflict, killed everyone but himself in an ice storm. However, the casualties included his clan members and civilians, which caused him to swear an oath never to use his powers again.

When Kano seizes control of another city, Kenshi argues that they need to help the townspeople but Kuai Liang refuses, resulting in a fight. Kuai Liang gains the upper hand and offers Kenshi one last chance to return to a normal life, but Kenshi chooses to enter the city where he is captured after killing more of the Black Dragon.

Kuai Liang burns down his farm to summon Scorpion and reassumes his past identity of Sub-Zero. They join forces and arrive at the city to free Kenshi as the latter is being tortured by Kano. After they kill the remaining Black Dragon members, they decapitate Kano but he survives and rushes to a chamber containing Kronika's Hourglass, which Kano had used to create an alternative timeline in which he unleashed the revenant infestation to gain his immense power. He is killed by Sub-Zero before he can then use the Hourglass to erase the cryomancer from existence, and the chamber's entrance self-destructs to seal off those from outside. Since he promised Scorpion to take him if he ever used his powers again, Sub-Zero departs to the Netherrealm, making Kenshi the successor of the Lin Kuei and the new protector of Earthrealm.

== Voice cast ==
- Manny Jacinto as Kenshi
- David Wenham as Kano
- Ron Yuan as Kuai Liang / Sub-Zero
- Keith Silverstein as Kabal
- Courtenay Taylor as Kira
- Yuri Lowenthal as Kobra
- Artt Butler as Shang Tsung
- Imari Williams as Tremor
- Patrick Seitz as Hanzo Hasashi / Scorpion
- Lei Yin as Sento, Peter
- Sumalee Montano as Kindra
- Debra Wilson as Graji

== Production ==
=== Development ===
Cover art for the film was leaked onto Twitter on August 1, 2022. Two days later on August 3, 2022, the film was formally announced via IGN.

=== Casting ===
David Wenham replaced Robin Atkin Downes as Kano from Mortal Kombat Legends: Scorpion's Revenge. Ron Yuan, who previously voiced Scorpion in Mortal Kombat 11, voiced Sub-Zero, replacing previous voice actor Bayardo De Murguia from Battle of the Realms.

== Reception ==
=== Critical response ===
Snow Blind holds a rating of 80% on Rotten Tomatoes based on five critical reviews. Sam Stone of Comic Book Resources wrote that the film was "the most intimate story of the Mortal Kombat Legends trilogy" and "is all about character at its heart." However, Renaldo Mateen of CBR lambasted the film's inclusion of Scorpion as an "overused franchise trope", commenting that "it's as if the series doesn't trust other A-listers, [instead] falling back on a lazy, tedious creative move." Brittany Vincent of IGN rated the film a 6 out of 10, saying that "centering the plot mostly around Kenshi is a smart move" and "it's refreshing to see a character that doesn't get much screen time shine for a bit", but criticized the plot for "spend[ing] too much time elsewhere away from Kenshi when we've already been drawn in and want to learn more about him." Stephen Wilds of ComingSoon.net praised the voice acting, character roster and "engaging" fight scenes, "but it's hard not to think that this outing won't hit as well for casual fans or those who don't appreciate the apocalyptic western genre."

== Prequel ==
At New York Comic Con 2022, a prequel, titled Cage Match, was announced for a 2023 release. Joel McHale reprises his role as Johnny Cage, as the main protagonist, from the first two installments of the Legends series.
