= Mortal Kombat Legends: Battle of the Realms =

2021 animated movie

- Official DVD/Blu-ray cover
- Directed by: Ethan Spaulding
- Screenplay by: Jeremy Adams
- Based on: Mortal Kombat by: Ed Boon; John Tobias
- Produced by: Rick Morales; Jim Krieg
- Starring: Jordan Rodrigues; Joel McHale; Jennifer Carpenter; Patrick Seitz; Bayardo De Murguia; Ike Amadi; Dave B. Mitchell; Artt Butler; Fred Tatasciore; Robin Atkin Downes
- Edited by: Robert Ehrenreich
- Music by: John Jennings Boyd; Eric V. Hachikian
- Production companies: Warner Bros. Animation; Studio Mir
- Distributed by: Warner Bros. Home Entertainment
- Release date: August 31, 2021
- Running time: 80 minutes
- Countries: United States; South Korea
- Language: English

Official trailer

Mortal Kombat Legends: Battle of the Realms is a 2021 adult animated martial arts film, directed by Ethan Spaulding from a screenplay by Jeremy Adams, based on the Mortal Kombat franchise created by Ed Boon and John Tobias, it is the second installment in the Mortal Kombat Legends film series and a direct sequel to Mortal Kombat Legends: Scorpion's Revenge (2020). Produced by Warner Bros. Animation and animated by Studio Mir, Boon returned from the predecessor as creative consultant.

Battle of the Realms borrows source materials from several series games and revolves around the otherworldly Mortal Kombat tournament set in Outworld. Liu Kang is chosen to fulfill his destiny as a tournament champion while Scorpion sets out to prevent the Kamidogu artifact from falling into the hands of Shinnok as he comes into conflict with the younger Sub-Zero. The film was released direct-to-video on August 31, 2021, and received mixed reviews from critics.

The third film in the series, Mortal Kombat Legends: Snow Blind, was released on October 11, 2022.

== Plot ==
Following the events of the previous Mortal Kombat tournament, Shao Kahn declares war on Earthrealm in retaliation for Shang Tsung's defeat through a new Mortal Kombat tournament set in Outworld. Princess Kitana, Kintaro, General Reiko, and Jade lead the Emperor's first wave invasion force of Outworld warriors and Netherrealm demons, laying siege against the Wu Shi monastery, but are repelled by Kung Lao and Special Forces cybernetically enhanced Jackson Briggs and NYPD officer Kurtis Stryker. At the onset of their assault, Kitana and the Outworld commanders are confronted by movie star Johnny Cage and Jax's partner Sonya Blade.

When Johnny and Sonya are soon joined by Liu Kang and Raiden as negotiations fail, Shao Kahn appears himself, petitioning Raiden to participate in a final Mortal Kombat tournament to permanently decide Earthrealm's fate. The thunder god agrees, and he and Shao Kahn venture to the realm of the Elder Gods to propose this ultimate contest.

Meanwhile, Scorpion reawakens back in the Netherrealm. He is confronted by the enraged Elder God Shinnok over the death of his favored servant Quan Chi. The Netherrealm lord engineers Scorpion's entrance into Earthrealm to utilize the key embedded in his body to find the final piece of his puzzle, anonymously hiring the Lin Kuei clan in tracking him down to claim his prize. Back in Earthrealm, Lin Kuei members Kuai Liang and Smoke are summoned by the grandmaster to participate in said request. But are horrified to witness missing peers they would questioned the whereabouts of prior to their urged presence having undergone cybernetic biomodifications as a means to strengthen the clan, with the juniors expected to do the same. Liang and Smoke rebel, with Liang being the only one to flee successfully. Liang then adopts his deceased brother's codename, Sub-Zero.

Back at the Wu Shi Temple, Raiden returns to his troops after arranging to hold and participate in the tournament while relinquishing his immortality. Once the Earthrealm warriors head for Outworld, Scorpion makes his presence known to Raiden. He mentions the key to Shinnok's prison has bonded to his soul and came to Raiden for advice about its purpose. Raiden informs him that it is a key to untold power known as the Kamidogu, a supreme magical relic from a bygone era that could doom all the realms.

At the start of the tournament, Cage is defeated by Kytinn warrior D'Vorah; Sonya defeats D'Vorah and Li Mei; Liu Kang defeats Jade; Stryker defeats Baraka; Jax defeats Kintaro by ripping his arms out of their sockets.

Back on Earth, Scorpion is being pursued by Cyrax and Sektor in a dockside shipping yard. The trio is soon interrupted by Sub-Zero, but even he is outmatched by their superior enhancements and the arrival of the cybernetic Smoke. With their enemies overwhelmed, the three cyber Lin Kuei apprehend their Hellspawn prey and make off to the Temple of Elements. At their destination, they force Hanzo to open their designated portal. As they prepare to eliminate him upon accessing its gateway, they are interrupted again by a vengeful Sub-Zero. Scorpion fails to console Kuai Liang over mistakenly murdering his brother but agrees to a temporary alliance against Sub-Zero's clan. Despite their efforts, the Lin Kuei retrieve the Kamidogu, leaving the pair for dead when the mountain crumbles on top of them.

As the second half of the final tournament is underway, Lao and Stryker are killed by Shao Kahn and Shang Tsung, respectively. Raiden is then defeated by Kitana in a match. Instead of killing Raiden, Kitana rebels against her stepfather and attacks Shao Kahn, only to be beaten into submission. Liu Kang defeats Shang Tsung regardless of a setback and spares him.

In the Netherrealm, the Lin Kuei realize too late that their employer was Shinnok as they learn of his plan to revive the One Being and bring an end to all of creation. Subsequently, they are betrayed and killed for their services.

During the tournament's final stage, Raiden dies while losing his battle against Shao Kahn, enraging Liu Kang to defeat the emperor and win the tournament. Liu Kang then frees Kitana and the two share a romantic moment. However, celebrations are cut short as Shinnok finally succeeds in resurrecting the One Being and fusing himself. With the aid of the Elder Gods, Sub-Zero, Scorpion, and Liu Kang engage in a fight and kill Shinnok while Johnny, Jax, Kitana, and Sonya protect civilians from Kahn's remaining army.

In the aftermath, Liu Kang absorbs the One Being's power and reverts the realms into their original state, including Edenia. Sonya and Johnny share a kiss while Liu and Kitana hold hands in hard-earned peace, unaware that Raiden is revived with his immortality.

== Voice cast ==
- Jordan Rodrigues as Liu Kang
- Dave B. Mitchell as Raiden, Sektor, Kintaro
- Joel McHale as Johnny Cage
- Jennifer Carpenter as Sonya Blade
- Ike Amadi as Jax Briggs, One Being
- Artt Butler as Shang Tsung, Shao Kahn Soldier, Cyrax
- Robin Atkin Downes as Shinnok, Reiko
- Grey DeLisle as Kitana
- Matthew Yang King as Kung Lao
- Bayardo De Murguia as Kuai Liang / Sub-Zero
- Matthew Mercer as Kurtis Stryker, Demon One, Smoke
- Paul Nakauchi as the Lin Kuei Grandmaster
- Emily O'Brien as Jade, Liu Lin
- Patrick Seitz as Hanzo Hasashi / Scorpion
- Debra Wilson as D'Vorah
- Fred Tatasciore as Shao Kahn
- Matthew Lillard as Shaggy Rogers

== Production ==
=== Development ===
Following the release of Scorpion's Revenge in April 2020, screenwriter Jeremy Adams expressed interest in doing a sequel. In June 2021, a sequel was announced, with most of the cast and crew from the previous film now set to return. On the day before the film's release, a Warner Bros. Animation logo variant featuring Shaggy Rogers from Scooby-Doo strangling Scorpion was uploaded onto the internet, inspired by the "Ultra Instinct Shaggy" internet meme, as a follow-up to the previous film's logo variant featuring Scorpion strangling Daffy Duck in place of Porky Pig.

=== Casting ===
Matthew Mercer reprised his role as Stryker from the 2011 video game. Dave B. Mitchell reprised his role as Sektor from Mortal Kombat 11, and Matthew Yang King, who voiced both Liu Kang and Fujin in Mortal Kombat 11, voiced Kung Lao in the film.

== Release ==
=== Home media ===
The film earned $1,652,738 from domestic Blu-ray sales.

== Reception ==
=== Critical response ===
Battle of the Realms holds a 50% rating with six reviews on Rotten Tomatoes, and has received a mixed critical reception. Mitchell Saltzman of IGN rated the film a five out of ten, calling it "a swing and a whiff" in that it "feels all over the place, attempting to tell too many stories at once and not doing any of them justice." Luke Y. Thompson of SuperHeroHype called the plot "wildly inconsistent" and that it "mostly serves as the thinnest of devices to get to the next fight." Den of Geek called the film "a narrative mess ... an incredibly busy movie that has too much going on to the point that there are two completely separate storylines happening at the same time that only briefly connect but ultimately converge in a bonkers and completely tacked on finale." However, Tanner Dedmon of ComicBook.com wrote that the film "wastes no time getting to the action" and "doubles down on things like x-rayed blows and key catchphrases that honor the source material and give characters their big moments without being too distracting."
