= Rhasaan Orange =

American comedian and actor (born 1975)

- Born: August 25, 1975 (age 50); New York, NY United States
- Occupations: Actor, comedian, podcast host
- Title: Black belt in 10th Planet Jiu-Jitsu

Rhasaan Orange (born August 25, 1975) is an American comedian and actor. Orange is, perhaps, best known for his creation and portrayal of the fictional Brazilian Renato Laranja. The Laranja persona is an arrogant Brazilian Jiu-Jitsu champion with a thick accent, and the character is somewhat of an alter ego; 'Laranja' is Portuguese for 'Orange'. Although Orange never grappled professionally, he earned a black belt rank in 10th Planet Jiu-Jitsu studying under Eddie Bravo. In 2018, he started hosting his own podcast called "The Vale Tudo Hour".

== Acting roles ==
Title	Year	Role	Notes
The Renato Laranja Show	2014	Renato Laranja	Web series
Revenge	2012	Tech	TV series
OB/GY Anne	2011	Dr. Richard Robbins	TV movie
Mortal Kombat	2011	Cyrax, Kintaro, SF Radio Operator	Video game (voice)
Numb	2010	Javi	Short film
Days of Our Lives	2003–2007	Thomas Edward 'Tek' Kramer	TV series
A Sight for Sore Eyes	2005	Jarred Williams	Short film
Half & Half	2005	Quincy	TV series
Undressed	2001	Joe	TV series
Jack and Jill	2001	Eric, Barto's study friend	TV series
Guiding Light	1999	Brian	TV series
Sex and the City	1999	Assistant	TV series
Coming Soon	1999	Sincere Boy	Film
The Mouse	1996	Shamster #2	
Sesame Street	1978-1983	Rhasaan	TV series
