= Artt Butler =

American voice actor

- Born: Arthur M. Butler; Los Angeles County, California, U.S.
- Occupation: Voice actor
- Years active: 2008–present

Artt Butler is an American voice actor. He is best known for his voice roles as Captain Ackbar in Star Wars: The Clone Wars, Rafael Diaz in Star vs. the Forces of Evil and Shang Tsung and Cyrax in the animated direct-to-video films Mortal Kombat Legends: Scorpion's Revenge (2020) and Mortal Kombat Legends: Battle of the Realms (2021)

== Early life ==
He is of half-Japanese and half-Mexican descent, which he refers himself as a "Jap-xican". In the early 1990s, he worked as a receptionist and manager for the Sandie Schnarr Talent agency.

== Career ==
In 2008, Butler made his first voice acting role as the voice of Sabato Kuroi in the English version of the anime series Blade of the Immortal.

In 2020, he provided the dual voice role of Uncle and Bill in the animated film Over the Moon. He then provided the voice of Shang Tsung in the direct-to-video animated film Mortal Kombat Legends: Scorpion's Revenge, a role he reprised in its sequel Mortal Kombat Legends: Battle of the Realms, where he also voiced Cyrax. He is also set to reprise his role in the upcoming third film Mortal Kombat Legends: Snow Blind.

For animated television, he voiced Captain Ackbar in the animated television series Star Wars: The Clone Wars in 2011 for three episodes. His other voice roles on shows include The Boondocks, Pig Goat Banana Cricket, Elena of Avalor, and The Loud House. From 2015 to 2019, he provided the voice of Rafael Diaz in the Disney Channel animated series Star vs. the Forces of Evil.

== Filmography ==
=== Film ===
==== Animation ====
Year	Title	Role	Notes	Source
2020	Mortal Kombat Legends: Scorpion's Revenge	Shang Tsung, Lin Kuei Assassin	Direct-to-video	
2020	Over the Moon	Uncle, Bill		
2021	Mortal Kombat Legends: Battle of the Realms	Shang Tsung, Cyrax, Shao Kahn Soldier	Direct-to-video	
2022	Mortal Kombat Legends: Snow Blind	Shang Tsung, Lin Kuei	Direct-to-video	

==== Live-action ====
Year	Title	Role	Notes	Source
2013	Her	Text Voice		

=== Television ===
==== Animation ====
Year	Title	Role	Notes	Source
2008	Blade of the Immortal	Sabato Kuroi	English version	
2010	The Boondocks	Agent Jack Flowers	Episode: "It's Goin' Down"	
2011	Star Wars: The Clone Wars	Captain Ackbar	3 episodes	
2014–15	Fifi: Cat Therapist	Bobby, Hamlet, Arvind	5 episodes	
2015–19	Star vs. the Forces of Evil	Rafael Diaz, Various	20 episodes	
2016	Pig Goat Banana Cricket	Plaintiff, Orion, Space Technician, Prisoner	Episode: "Road Trippin'"	
2017	Rapunzel's Tangled Adventure	Dale	2 episodes	
2017–18	Elena of Avalor	Roberto Núnez, Various voices	3 episodes	
2022–present	The Loud House	Mr. Mu	2 episodes	
2026	The Doomies	Romy's Dad, Various		

==== Live-action ====
Year	Title	Role	Notes	Source
2014	Two and a Half Men	Robot	Episode: "Oh WALD-E, Good Times Ahead"	
2015	I Didn't Do It	P.A. Announcer	Episode: "Lindy and Logan's Brrrrrthday"	
2017–18	Mom	Male Voice, TV Announcer	2 episodes	
2017	Rhett & Link's Buddy System	Roberto	Episode: "To Kill a Robot"	

=== Video games ===
Year	Title	Role	Notes	Source
2012	Syndicate	Ben Lee, Additional Voices		
2016	Masquerada: Songs and Shadows	Nahl Varius, Dactite (Sewer)		
2020	Ghost of Tsushima	Sogen, Chouta, Hachi, Additional Voices		
2021	Lost Judgment	Akihiro Ehara	English version	
2023	Diablo IV	Genbar		
2023	Avatar: The Last Airbender - Quest for Balance	Iroh, Additional voices		
2024	Nickelodeon All-Star Brawl 2	Iroh	Iroh voiceover added on August 16, 2024 update	
