= Rokurō =

- Gender: Male

Origin
- Origin: Japanese
- Meaning: Different meanings depending on the kanji used

Rokurō, Rokuro or Rokurou (written: 六郎 or 六朗) is a masculine Japanese given name. Notable people with the name include:

- Rokuro Ishikawa (石川 六郎; 1925–2005), Japanese businessman
- Rokurō Mochizuki (望月 六郎; born 1957), Japanese film director
- Rokurō Naya (納谷 六朗; 1932–2014), Japanese voice actor
- Rokuro Takahashi (高橋 六郎; 1909–?), Japanese rower
- Yashiro Rokurō (八代 六郎; 1860–1930), Imperial Japanese Navy admiral

== Fictional characters ==
- Rokurou Rangestu (ロクロウ・ランゲツ), a character in the video game Tales of Berseria
- Rokuroh, a character in the air combat video game The Sky Crawlers: Innocent Aces
