= Mortal Kombat Legends: Scorpion's Revenge =

2020 film by Ethan Spaulding

- Official DVD/Blu-ray cover
- Directed by: Ethan Spaulding
- Screenplay by: Jeremy Adams
- Based on: Mortal Kombat by Ed Boon & John Tobias
- Produced by: Rick Morales; Jim Krieg
- Starring: Patrick Seitz; Steve Blum; Jordan Rodrigues; Joel McHale; Jennifer Carpenter; Darin De Paul; Artt Butler; Dave B. Mitchell
- Edited by: Robert Ehrenreich
- Music by: John Jennings Boyd; Eric V. Hachikian
- Production companies: Warner Bros. Animation; Studio Mir
- Distributed by: Warner Bros. Home Entertainment
- Release date: April 14, 2020
- Running time: 80 minutes
- Country: United States
- Language: English

Official trailer

Mortal Kombat Legends: Scorpion's Revenge is a 2020 American adult animated martial arts film based on the Mortal Kombat franchise created by Ed Boon and John Tobias. South Korean studio Mir animated the film and was produced by Warner Bros. Animation. It is the first installment in the Mortal Kombat Legends film series. Borrowing source material from Mortal Kombat, the film contains two plots: one dealing with Scorpion seeking his revenge on those who murdered his family and clan after being resurrected by Quan Chi, the other follows Johnny Cage, Liu Kang and Sonya Blade, who are chosen to participate in the Mortal Kombat tournament for the fate of Earthrealm.

It marks the first Mortal Kombat based property to be produced at Warner Bros. Animation after its parent company acquired the franchise in 2009 from Midway Games, and the first Mortal Kombat animated project since the 1996 animated series Mortal Kombat: Defenders of the Realm, featuring co-creator Ed Boon involved as creative consultant as well as the first Mortal Kombat film to be rated R by the MPA.

The film was released direct-to-video on April 14, 2020, on digital, and on April 28 for 4K Ultra HD Blu-ray, Blu-ray, and DVD releases. It received positive reviews. A sequel, Mortal Kombat Legends: Battle of the Realms, was released on August 31, 2021.

== Plot ==
In 1600's Japan, Shirai Ryu grandmaster Hanzo Hasashi and his young son Satoshi are ambushed on their way home by several assassins from the rival Lin Kuei clan. Hanzo kills them after discovering that the Lin Kuei have slaughtered the rest of the Shirai Ryu, including his wife, Harumi. The Lin Kuei's Grandmaster Sub-Zero appears, uses his freezing abilities to restrain Hanzo in ice, and then slaughters Satoshi by crushing his neck. He then impales Hanzo through the neck with an icicle, killing him.

In the present day, thunder god Raiden and the Shaolin monk Liu Kang make preparations to defend Earthrealm by participating in the Mortal Kombat tournament, hosted by the aging warlock Shang Tsung. The tournament's victor will battle Goro to decide the fate of Earthrealm. The pair are accompanied by out-of-work Hollywood actor Johnny Cage and Special Forces agent Sonya Blade, with both having their reasons for participating: Sonya is in pursuit of Black Dragon crime syndicate leader Kano, while Cage believes that he is participating in a film project.

Meanwhile, in the Netherrealm, Hanzo awakens to impending torment from the Demon Torturer. Hanzo escapes and kills the Demon Torturer and several other demons. He finally meets with the sorcerer Quan Chi, who persuades Hanzo to fight for him in the Mortal Kombat tournament so that he can exact his revenge on Sub-Zero. Hanzo agrees, dubbing himself Scorpion.

Upon arrival on Shang Tsung's island, Scorpion attempts to steal Shinnok's amulet on Quan Chi's orders, but Raiden persuades him not to follow through on the deal. Meanwhile, Cage, Sonya, and Liu Kang witness Sonya's partner Jackson "Jax" Briggs having his arms ripped off by Goro until Raiden intervenes, and cauterizes Jax's arms. During the course of the tournament, Cage barely claims victory over a Tarkatan and realizes he is in an actual fighting tournament, not an action film. Sonya successfully garrotes Reptile. Liu Kang then fights Kitana. The two engage in a battle and eventually Liu Kang wins. The two have a short conversation before Kitana yields. In an attempt to stop the Earthrealm heroes, Kano has his assassins infiltrate the island to kill them, but they are all killed by Scorpion. While attempting to fight Kano, Sub-Zero appears and helps deal with the assassins, but a vengeful Scorpion attacks him and tackles him off a bridge into a spike pit, impaling them both and killing Sub-Zero. Cage and Sonya pursue Kano to rescue Jax while Liu Kang rushes to Shang Tsung's throne room to face Goro.

Quan Chi appears before Scorpion and reveals that he was directly responsible for the slaughter of the Shirai Ryu, having disguised himself as Sub-Zero and manipulated the Lin Kuei into doing his bidding and that the real Sub-Zero had no part in the massacre. Enraged, Scorpion removes himself from the spike to exact revenge. At the climax of the tournament, Shang Tsung is revealed to have already known of Quan Chi's true intentions from the beginning and captures him. Liu Kang is almost killed during his match with Goro but is saved when Scorpion kills Goro with his kunai, while Cage, Sonya, and Jax successfully kill Kano. Shang Tsung attempts to have Scorpion fight Liu Kang, but the specter outsmarts the sorcerer and attacks him instead, forcing him to give him the amulet and willingly forfeit his status as a fighter, in turn securing Liu Kang's position as the victor of the tournament. Tsung warns that Shao Kahn will have his revenge as he retreats to Outworld. The island begins to collapse, forcing the Earthrealm heroes to evacuate by a nearby boat. At the same time, Scorpion succeeds in killing Quan Chi in kombat before joining his family and clan in the afterlife. Later on the ship, Raiden tells Liu Kang that it was not his destiny to defeat Goro but to defeat Shao Kahn himself.

In the aftermath, Shang Tsung is tortured by Shao Kahn for his failure before being ordered to prepare for Earthrealm's invasion.

== Voice cast ==
- Patrick Seitz as Hanzo Hasashi / Scorpion
- Jordan Rodrigues as Liu Kang
- Dave B. Mitchell as Raiden, Lin Kuei Warrior
- Joel McHale as Johnny Cage
- Jennifer Carpenter as Sonya Blade
- Ike Amadi as Jax Briggs
- Robin Atkin Downes as Kano, Shinnok
- Grey Griffin as Kitana, Satoshi Hasashi
- Steve Blum as Bi-Han / Sub-Zero
- Artt Butler as Shang Tsung, Lin Kuei Assassin
- Darin De Paul as Quan Chi
- Kevin Michael Richardson as Goro reprises from 1995 film, Bystander
- Fred Tatasciore as Moloch, Shao Kahn
- Eric Bauza as Daffy Duck (via archive recordings)

== Production ==
=== Development ===
Reports of a new animated Mortal Kombat film was hinted at in January 2019 as a tie–in to the upcoming live–action reboot film Mortal Kombat. A year later, the animated film was announced officially as Mortal Kombat Legends: Scorpion's Revenge. Upon the film's official release, a special variant of the Warner Bros. Animation logo featured Scorpion strangling the Looney Tunes character Daffy Duck in place of Porky Pig for the normal opening logo. The logo originally was going to be where Daffy was impaled through the head by Scorpion's Kunai, but that was changed due to the studio having to adhere to age-appropriation regulations for their opening logos. This would follow up a year later in the film's sequel, Mortal Kombat Legends: Battle of the Realms featuring Shaggy Rogers from Scooby-Doo strangling Scorpion.

=== Casting ===
Patrick Seitz returned as the voice of Scorpion after his absence from Mortal Kombat 11. Steve Blum, who voiced the Kuai Liang version of Sub-Zero in Mortal Kombat X, voiced Bi-Han in the film. Grey DeLisle voices Kitana after missing Mortal Kombat X due to her pregnancy at the time. Goro was voiced by Kevin Michael Richardson, who had voiced the character in the 1995 feature film.

== Release ==
=== Rating ===
Ed Boon confirmed on his Twitter account that the film will receive an "R" rating, marking the first time a Mortal Kombat film has been rated R.

=== Marketing ===
The first trailer was released online on January 28, 2020. A red-band trailer for the film was released on March 8, 2020, during the "Final Kombat" tournament following the trailer debut of Mortal Kombat 11 guest fighter Spawn.

=== Home media ===
The film earned $508,501 from domestic DVD sales and $2,126,194 from domestic Blu-ray sales, bringing its total home video earning to $2,634,695.

== Reception ==
=== Critical response ===
Scorpion's Revenge holds an approval rating of 90% based on 21 reviews on Rotten Tomatoes, with an average rating of 7.3/10.

Critical reception was mostly positive. Andrew Pollard of Starburst said, "Brimming with jaw-dropping brutality, the slickest of slick stunning animation, [and] a solid and engaging driving narrative ... this truly feels like the Mortal Kombat movie that people have for so long been clamouring for." Alessandro Fillari of GameSpot called the film "a fun ride that is faithful to the series" that excelled when it focused on Scorpion, but felt the character-heavy storyline "makes for an overstuffed plot ... that fans have seen several times before in the games." Sam Stone of Comic Book Resources described Scorpion's Revenge as "a bloody good time" and praised its development of the characters' backstories, while Screen Rant called it "an excellent debut for Warner Bros. Animation's Mortal Kombat movies, taking all of the aspects that fans love most about the franchise and executing them with style." Bloody Disgusting wrote, "Scorpion's Revenge wears its love and respect for the source material on its sleeve, while in the process delivering a kick-ass entertaining animated movie." However, Bob Chipman of The Escapist opined that the film "is pretty good when it's about Scorpion and not so much when it's about...anything else from Mortal Kombat," and Joshua Yehl of IGN commented, "The movie's biggest problem is that it tries to do the epic Mortal Kombat tournament arc on top of a more personal Scorpion story and ends up doing justice to neither."

In July 2021, the Oktyabrsky District Court in Saint Petersburg banned the film, claiming that it "can motivate aggressive or self-harming behavior."
