= Mortal Kombat Advance =

2001 video game

- European - Cover Art
- Developer: Virtucraft
- Publisher: Midway
- Series: Mortal Kombat
- Platform: Game Boy Advance
- Release: NA: December 12, 2001; EU: February 21, 2002
- Genre: Fighting
- Mode: Single-player

Mortal Kombat Advance is a 2001 fighting game developed by Virtucraft and published by Midway for the Game Boy Advance. Part of the Mortal Kombat series, it is a handheld version of Ultimate Mortal Kombat 3 (1995), although it was designed with the intention of evoking the best aspects of the first three games in the series and Mortal Kombat Trilogy.

Mortal Kombat Advance allows players to take control of one of multiple playable characters, who fights against a computer-controlled or player-controlled opponent one-on-one. The game allows players to use various combo moves, as well as fatalities at the end of the fight. Due to the Game Boy Advance having fewer buttons than the arcade cabinets the games originally appeared on, the designers had to modify how Mortal Kombat Advance controlled.

Upon release, Mortal Kombat Advance received highly negative reviews from critics for its lackluster controls, low-quality graphics, and poorly programmed artificial intelligence for computer-controlled opponents. It was named the worst game of 2002 by GameSpot and one of the worst games of all time by GamesRadar+.

== Gameplay ==
Mortal Kombat Advance is based on Ultimate Mortal Kombat 3, and allows players to control one of multiple playable characters in one-on-one fights against either computer-controlled or player-controlled opponents. The objective is to completely deplete the opponent's health bar, while preventing them from depleting the player character's health bar. This can be accomplished using both simple attacks as well as combo techniques, which are done using button command combinations. A character must defeat the opponent at least twice in order to win the match. Players are then given either "Finish Him" or "Finish Her" prompts, at which point they may either attack them normally or perform a button combo to initiate a Fatality, which ends the fight in a more brutal way.

== Development ==
Mortal Kombat Advance was developed by Virtucraft, a Lancashire-based freelance development studio formed to develop Game Boy Color games and later Game Boy Advance games. Publisher Midway Games had approached Virtucraft in the past to discuss working together, though Virtucraft was either too busy or, when they were not, Midway had no games for them to develop. The timing eventually lined up, allowing Virtucraft to begin development on Mortal Kombat Advance. The designers began work on implementing multiplayer via the Game Link Cable early on in development. When redesigning the combat for the Game Boy Advance, the developers had to modify the control system due to the Game Boy Advance's more limited button count. They worked with Midway in order to try to get it right.

The game was designed as an amalgamation of the best parts of the first three Mortal Kombat games as well as Mortal Kombat Trilogy, though it is primarily a version of Ultimate Mortal Kombat 3. When designing the graphics, they were largely able to make the game look identical to the arcade versions, though graphics had to be shrunken down. They developed a compression system that was meant to allow to store a large number of animations without sacrificing animation or visual quality.

Before Mortal Kombat Advance was revealed, series creator Ed Boon asked on his personal website which Mortal Kombat characters people would like to see, and which game they would like to see on the Game Boy Advance. When revealed, it was slated for a December 2001 release date. It was released on December 12, 2001. The game was re-released as part of the Mortal Kombat: Legacy Kollection compilation in 2025.

== Reception ==
Reception

Aggregate score
Aggregator	Score
Metacritic	33/100

Review scores
Publication	Score
AllGame	2/5
Consoles +	75%
Electronic Gaming Monthly	0/10, 1.5/10, 0.5/10
EP Daily	2.5/10
Game Informer	5.75/10
GameSpot	2.9/10
GameSpy	40%
GameZone	6.9/10
IGN	2/10
Nintendo World Report	2.5/10

Mortal Kombat Advance received "generally unfavorable" reviews according to the review aggregation website Metacritic. GameSpot's Jeff Gerstmann said it "plays little to nothing like the game it's based on". He said that the graphics are good, the controls are responsive, and it is the first handheld Mortal Kombat in which executing special moves is not overly frustrating, but that differences in the timing and the difficulty of hitting an opponent with an uppercut prevent it from feeling like a Mortal Kombat game. He further criticized that the relentless computer AI makes it impossible to win in single-player without relying on cheap tactics. In Electronic Gaming Monthly it received a 0, a 1.5, and a 0.5 out of 10. The 0 score was the first in the magazine's history, given out by editor Dan Hsu, who clarified that "[it] was not a misprint," and that it was worse than every other bad fighting game combined. He was highly critical of the game for lacking content and for its low-quality programming. He also felt that the computer AI was unfair and stupid at the same time, and was one of the glitchiest games he ever played. AllGame writer Skyler Miller felt that the audio and visuals were quality, but that the difficulty was "brutal" due in part to poor controls. IGN writer Craig Harris anticipated what Virtucraft could do with this title, commenting that when porting a beloved game, it is important to get it right due to how fans would respond. He said he was "crushed" by Virtucraft's output here, feeling that it was relatively simple to get right due to availability of materials and "blueprints". He cited that poor AI was the game's biggest flaw, but also criticized the game's controls for being sloppy and untested. Game Informer writer Justin Leeper said that regardless of the content or "arcade accuracy", the controls make it difficult to play well. Nintendo World Report writer Andres Rojas felt that despite good audio and visuals, the poor controls, slowdown, and AI make it terrible to play.

Multiple outlets have regarded Mortal Kombat Advance as a particularly bad video game. It won the accolade for "Worst Game on Game Boy Advance" at GameSpot's Best and Worst of 2002 Awards. In 2017, GamesRadar+ ranked it at #13 on the list of its 50 Worst Games of All Time. The Gamer listed it as one of the worst Game Boy Advance games due to its poor AI and controls, and Den of Geek stated that it was the worst Mortal Kombat game. In their overview of the series, Nick Thorpe and Darran Jones of Retro Gamer stated that talented developers such as Crawfish Interactive could port games like Street Fighter Alpha 3 to the Game Boy Advance with little loss in playability and that Virtucraft made a "rather atrocious" port of Ultimate Kombat 3 noting the dropped features, the lack of timing in the games movies and insane difficulty made the game "utter garbage".

== See also ==
- List of video games notable for negative reception
