= Mortal Kombat: Legacy Kollection =

2025 video game compilation

- North American cover art
- Developer: Digital Eclipse
- Publisher: Atari
- Director: Mike Mika
- Producer: Steven Johnson
- Artist: Nick Bruty
- Composer: Bob Baffy (Note: Baffy only composed music for the main menu.)
- Series: Mortal Kombat
- Platforms: Nintendo Switch; Nintendo Switch 2; PlayStation 4; PlayStation 5; Windows; Xbox One; Xbox Series X/S
- Release: October 30, 2025
- Genres: Fighting, action-adventure
- Modes: Single-player, multiplayer

Mortal Kombat: Legacy Kollection is a 2025 compilation developed by Digital Eclipse and published by Atari. It is a compilation of several earlier entries in the Mortal Kombat series, originally released by Midway between 1992 and 2003. The compilation was released digitally on October 30, 2025, for Nintendo Switch, Nintendo Switch 2, PlayStation 4, PlayStation 5, Windows, Xbox One and Xbox Series X/S, with a physical release on December 12.

== Gameplay ==
The game compiles multiple versions of the first four Mortal Kombat arcade fighting games, including many of their home console and portable versions, as well as select spinoffs and handheld entries. The compilation includes the first public release of the "WaveNet" version of Ultimate Mortal Kombat 3, which was only briefly available during limited arcade location tests in 1997 and was presumed lost. All games in the collection support online multiplayer with rollback netcode. A "Fatality Trainer" mode allows players to practice performing the game's fatality moves. Optional menu toggles allow players to unlock each game's hidden content, as well as access developer menus and other hidden options. The game features substantial behind-the-scenes material, including interviews with original development team members such as Ed Boon, John Tobias, John Vogel and Dan Forden, using the same "interactive timeline" format seen in other Digital Eclipse compilations such as Atari 50. Character profiles and timelines that summarize the series' narrative are also included. Other features include a music player, optional CRT filters, and the ability to rewind gameplay.

=== Games ===
The 23 games and versions included in Mortal Kombat: Legacy Kollection are:

Games in the collection
Title	Arcade	SNES	Genesis	Game Boy	Game Gear	32X	PS1	GBA
Mortal Kombat	Yes	Yes	Yes	Yes	Yes	—N/a	—N/a	—N/a
Mortal Kombat II	Yes	Yes	Yes	Yes	—N/a	Yes	—N/a	—N/a
Mortal Kombat 3	Yes	Yes	Yes	—N/a	—N/a	—N/a	—N/a	—N/a
Ultimate Mortal Kombat 3	Yes (Note: Includes the original and WaveNet arcade versions)	Yes	—N/a	—N/a	—N/a	—N/a	—N/a	—N/a
Mortal Kombat Trilogy	—N/a	—N/a	—N/a	—N/a	—N/a	—N/a	Yes	—N/a
Mortal Kombat Mythologies: Sub-Zero	—N/a	—N/a	—N/a	—N/a	—N/a	—N/a	Yes	—N/a
Mortal Kombat 4	Yes	—N/a	—N/a	—N/a	—N/a	—N/a	—N/a	—N/a
Mortal Kombat: Special Forces	—N/a	—N/a	—N/a	—N/a	—N/a	—N/a	Yes	—N/a
Mortal Kombat Advance	—N/a	—N/a	—N/a	—N/a	—N/a	—N/a	—N/a	Yes
Mortal Kombat: Deadly Alliance	—N/a	—N/a	—N/a	—N/a	—N/a	—N/a	—N/a	Yes
Mortal Kombat: Tournament Edition	—N/a	—N/a	—N/a	—N/a	—N/a	—N/a	—N/a	Yes

== Release ==
Trailer for the collection, showcasing various games and bonus content

Legacy Kollection was released first digitally on October 30, 2025. A physical release followed on December 12, and is also available in Deluxe and "Kollector's Edition" formats with additional physical bonuses. An update for digital releases via Steam was released shortly after the games release that contained improvements to audio for Mortal Kombat 4 and some stability improvements for the Genesis titles. Further updates included lobbies and online play, cross-platform play, variable refresh rate and a new feature called "The Khronicle of the Realms", which contains an illustrated history between the narratives and conflicts depicted in the first four arcade games.

== Reception ==
Reception

Aggregate score
Aggregator	Score
Metacritic	(NS2) 78/100 (PC) 78/100 (PS5) 84/100 (XSXS) 84/100

Review scores
Publication	Score
Game Informer	8.75/10
GameSpot	9/10
IGN	8/10
Nintendo Life	7/10
Push Square	9/10
Retro Gamer	90%
Shacknews	8/10
Video Games Chronicle	4/5

Mortal Kombat: Legacy Kollection received "generally favorable" reviews from critics, according to review aggregator website Metacritic.

The game received criticism at launch with players reporting issues relating to input lag, audio distortions, and incomplete or missing features, leading to a "Mixed" rating on Steam. On November 4, 2025, it was reported that players were offered refunds on the PlayStation Store. On the same day, developer Digital Eclipse released a patch that attempted to address the issues.

Mortal Kombat: Legacy Kollection was nominated for "Best Fighting Game" at The Game Awards 2025, and won "Fighting Game of the Year" at the 29th Annual D.I.C.E. Awards.
