= Ultimate Mortal Kombat 3 =

1995 video game

- North American cover art
- Developer: Midway (Note: Saturn version developed by Eurocom; Genesis and SNES versions developed by Avalanche Software; Game Boy Advance version developed by Virtucraft; Nintendo DS version developed by Other Ocean Interactive; iOS version developed by Electronic Arts.)
- Publishers: Midway: Saturn; NA: Williams Entertainment; PAL: GT Interactive Genesis/Mega Drive, Super NES; NA: Williams Entertainment; PAL: Acclaim Entertainment iOS Electronic Arts
- Producers: Neil Nicastro; Ken Fedesna; Paul Dussault
- Programmer: Ed Boon
- Artists: John Tobias; Steve Beran; Tony Goskie
- Composer: Dan Forden
- Series: Mortal Kombat
- Platform: Arcade: Sega Saturn, Genesis/Mega Drive, Super NES, PlayStation 2, (Note: Bundled with the special edition of Mortal Kombat: Armageddon) Xbox 360, Nintendo DS, iOS, J2ME
- Release: November 1995: Arcade; NA: November 1995 Saturn; NA: June 27, 1996; EU: June 1996 Genesis/Mega Drive; NA: October 11, 1996; EU: December 1996 Super NES; NA: October 11, 1996; EU: December 1996 Xbox 360; WW: October 25, 2006 Nintendo DS; NA: November 12, 2007; EU: December 7, 2007 J2ME; NA: November 30, 2010 iOS; WW: December 16, 2010
- Genre: Fighting
- Modes: Single-player, multiplayer
- Arcade system: Midway Wolf Unit

Ultimate Mortal Kombat 3 is a 1995 fighting game developed and published by Midway for arcades. Part of the Mortal Kombat series, it is a standalone update of 1995's earlier Mortal Kombat 3 with an altered gameplay system and some new features, as well as additional characters like the returning favorites Reptile, Kitana, Jade, and Scorpion, who were missing from Mortal Kombat 3.

Several home port versions of the game were soon released after the arcade original. Although none were completely identical to the arcade version, the Nintendo DS port came closest. Other versions followed, with some released under different titles, such as Mortal Kombat Advance (2001) for the Game Boy Advance. An iOS version recreating the game using a 3D graphics engine was released by Electronic Arts in 2010.

Ultimate Mortal Kombat 3 was mostly well-received and has been considered a high point for the Mortal Kombat series. However, the iOS remake and some other home versions were received poorly. Ultimate Mortal Kombat 3 was updated to include more content from previous games in the series as Mortal Kombat Trilogy in 1996. The 2011 compilation Mortal Kombat Arcade Kollection includes an emulation of UMK3 as well as the first Mortal Kombat and Mortal Kombat II.

== Gameplay ==
A fight between Smoke and Scorpion

Two new gameplay modes have been introduced since the original Mortal Kombat 3: the 2-on-2 mode which was similar to an Endurance match but with as many as three human players in a given round on both sides (these had not been seen in the series since the first Mortal Kombat), and a new eight-player Tournament mode. An extra Master difficulty is present. Shao Kahn's Lost Treasures – selectable prizes, of which some are extra fights and others lead to various cutscenes or other things – are introduced after either the main game or the eight-player Tournament are completed.

To balance the gameplay, some characters were given new moves and some existing moves were altered. Some characters were given extra combos and some combos were made to cause less damage. Chain combos could be started by using a jump punch (vertical or angled) or a vertical jump kick, which creates more opportunities to use combos. Combos that knock opponents in the air no longer send one's opponent to the level above in multi-layered levels; only regular uppercuts do this.

The computer-controlled opponent AI was improved in the game. However, three new flaws were introduced along with the revisions: while backflipping away from an opponent, if the player performs a jump kick, the AI character will always throw a projectile; this leaves the computer character vulnerable to some attacks and can easily lead into a devastating combo. If the player walks back-and-forth within a certain range of the AI character, the opponent will mimic the player's walking movements for the whole round and never attack. If the computer opponent is cornered, the player can repeatedly perform punches without the AI character stumbling back, thus allowing the player to win easily.

UMK3 features several new backgrounds: Scorpion's Lair/Hell (this stage also contains a new Stage Fatality, where an uppercut can send the opponent into a river of lava); Jade's Desert (in a reference to his MK3 ending, Cyrax is seen stuck waist-deep in sand in the background); River Kombat/The Waterfront; Kahn's Kave/The Cavern; Blue Portal/Lost (a combination of the background from the UMK3 "Choose Your Destiny" screen, the Pit 3 bridge, and the mountains and bridge from the Pit II in Mortal Kombat II); Noob's Dorfen (based on the Balcony stage, which can now be played using a Kombat Kode without having to fight Noob Saibot to see it as in MK3). Before reaching any of the original MK3 backgrounds in 1- or 2-player mode, the game must cycle through all of the UMK3 exclusive backgrounds twice. Scorpion's Lair, Secret Cave, and Abandoned River stages are selectable by using a password while on the missing Bank Stage cycle. In Scorpion's Lair, fighters can uppercut each other into Kahn's Kave. The original red portal background used for the "Choose Your Destiny" screen is now blue.

Some elements from MK3 are missing in UMK3. The only biographies featured are those of Kitana, Jade, Scorpion, and Reptile (the ninja characters who were not included in MK3), which are the only four shown during attract mode, while all of the biographies and the full-body portraits of the MK3 characters are missing. The biographies that do appear in the game are presented differently from those in MK3, as are the endings. The storyline images and text do not appear. Finally, the Bank and Hidden Portal stages from MK3 were removed (Jade's Desert serves as a placeholder where The Bank stage used to appear once the player reaches the original MK3 level cycle).

The Sega Genesis and SNES versions were released the same month as Mortal Kombat Trilogy and incorporated that game's finishing move Brutalities, an 11-button combo which causes the character to rapidly beat on their opponent until they explode.

== Characters ==
The arcade version features all playable characters from Mortal Kombat 3, who were portrayed by the same actors: Cyrax (Sal Divita), Liu Kang (Eddie Wong), Kabal (Richard Divizio), Kano (Richard Divizio), Kung Lao (Tony Marquez), Stryker (Michael O'Brien), Jax Briggs (John Parrish), Nightwolf (Sal Divita), Sektor (Sal Divita), Shang Tsung (John Turk), Sheeva (stop motion), Sindel (Lia Montelongo), Smoke (Sal Divita), Sonya Blade (Kerri Hoskins), and Sub-Zero (John Turk). The boss and sub-boss from MK3, Motaro (stop motion) and Shao Kahn (Brian Glynn, voiced by Steve Ritchie), also return. Shang Tsung's transformations are accompanied by announcements of the name of the character he is changing into.

There are four additional characters that are playable from the start: several ninja characters from the first two games that have been absent from Mortal Kombat 3 return in Ultimate Mortal Kombat 3, including Kitana, Jade, Reptile, and Scorpion on the prototype version; a new Ultimate Kombat Kode was added in revision 1.0 to enable Mileena, Ermac, and Classic Sub-Zero as secret characters.

- Jade (Becky Gable) – After the renegade princess Kitana killed her evil twin Mileena and escaped from Outworld to Earth, her close friend Jade was appointed by the emperor Shao Kahn to find and bring her back alive.
- Kitana (Becky Gable) – She is accused of treason after killing Mileena; she now attempts to reach queen Sindel to warn her of their true past.
- Reptile (John Turk) – As one of Shao Kahn's most trusted servants, Reptile assists Jade in the hunt for Kitana, but with orders to kill her if necessary.
- Scorpion (John Turk) – Scorpion escapes from Earth's hell after Shao Kahn's failed attempt at stealing the souls of Earthrealm. He eventually joins the struggle against Outworld.

More are unlockable via the Ultimate Kombat Kode:

- Classic Sub-Zero (John Turk) – Having been seemingly killed in the first game, Sub-Zero mysteriously returns to again attempt the assassination of Shang Tsung.
- Ermac (John Turk) – A mysterious warrior that exists as a life force of the souls of dead Outworld warriors in Shao Kahn's possession.
- Mileena (Becky Gable) – After she was killed by Kitana, Mileena was brought back to life by Shao Kahn to help him defeat Earth's warriors with her combat skills and a mind-reading connection to her sister.

Finally, Smoke's human form can be unlocked via a code entered right before a match.

Returning characters were warmly welcomed by critics as an improvement to the "lackluster roster" of MK3 with "the greatly missed" Kitana, Mileena, Reptile, and especially Scorpion. The female ninja characters (Mileena, Kitana, and Jade), returning from Mortal Kombat II, were portrayed by a different actress, Becky Gable, due to the lawsuit issued by Katalin Zamiar and some of the other MKII actors against Midway; they were also given a different set of outfits and hairstyles, which were again identical for all of them (in the game there are just three palette swapped character models for male, female, and cyborg ninjas, not counting the MK3 Sub-Zero but including Classic Sub-Zero).

There are also two new hidden opponents and console exclusives: Noob Saibot (John Turk) and Rain (John Turk). Although Noob Saibot was featured in the original MK3, he is no longer a palette swap of Kano but instead of a ninja; as before, he is fought via a Kombat Kode. Rain is featured in the game's opening montage (except on the Sega Saturn), but he is actually a fake hidden character that is not found in the arcade game. Both Noob Saibot and Rain were made playable for the 16-bit console versions, although Sheeva was removed, and the two boss characters are playable via a cheat code. The only arcade version to feature Noob Saibot as a playable character is the WaveNet version.

== Release ==
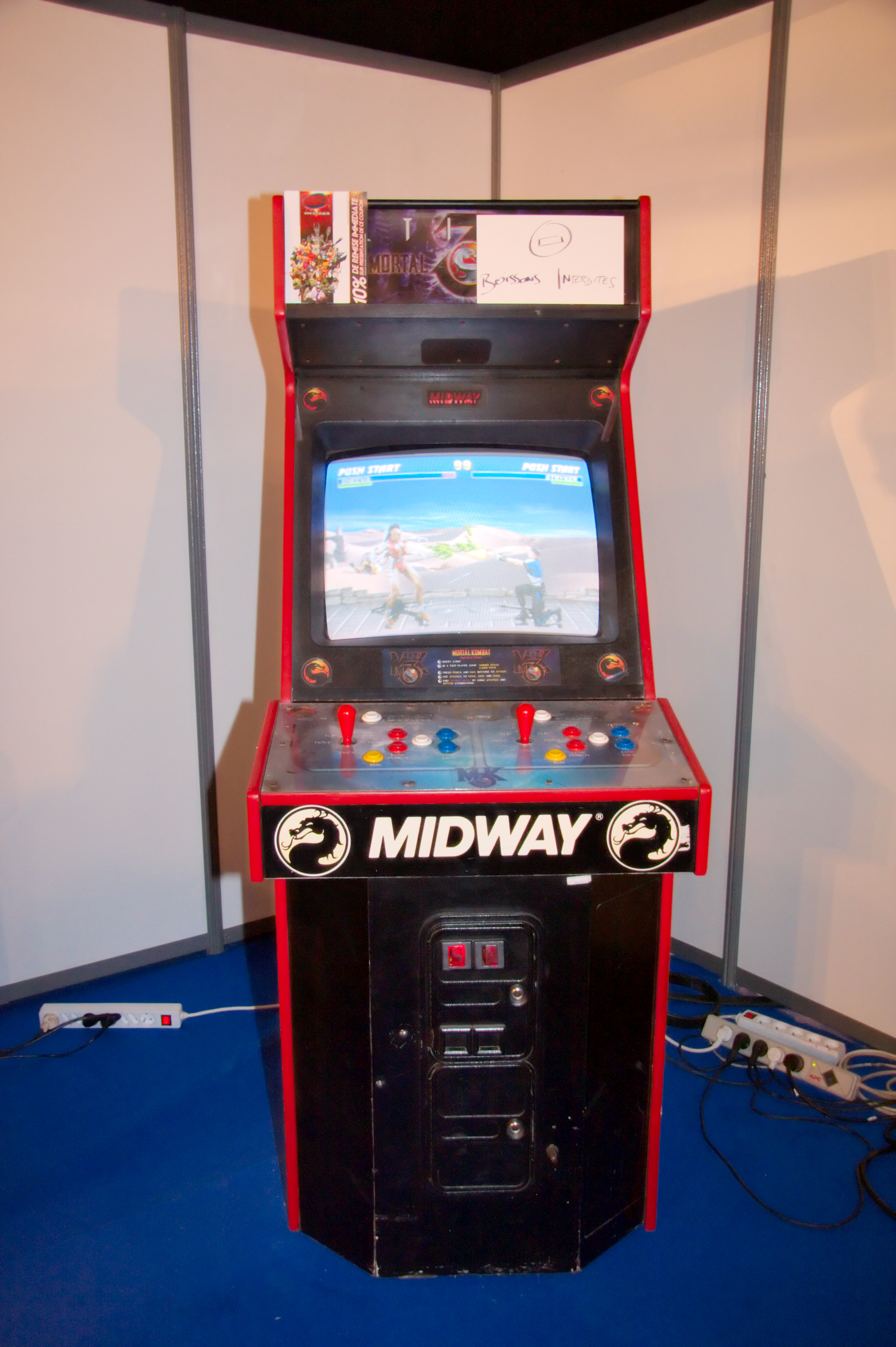
UMK3 arcade machine

Ultimate Mortal Kombat 3 was first released for North American arcades in early November 1995. Arcade owners who already owned Mortal Kombat 3 were provided with the option to upgrade to Ultimate Mortal Kombat 3 at no cost. In 2008, Mortal Kombat series co-creator, designer, and producer Ed Boon said that UMK3 was his favorite 2D Mortal Kombat title. It was also the last game he has programmed himself.

Ultimate Mortal Kombat 3 was ported to many home consoles with varying results, including home (Super NES, Sega Genesis, and Saturn) and portable consoles (Game Boy Advance and Nintendo DS), the Xbox 360 (via Xbox Live Arcade), and iOS-based mobile devices and mobile phones. A planned port for the PlayStation evolved into Mortal Kombat Trilogy. The game was also bundled with the premium version of Mortal Kombat: Armageddon for the PlayStation 2 and included in the compilation Mortal Kombat Arcade Kollection for the PC, PlayStation 3 and Xbox 360. The developers and publishers of the various releases included Acclaim Entertainment, Avalanche Software, Electronic Arts, Eurocom, Warner Bros. Interactive Entertainment, and Williams Entertainment. The later versions usually feature online play and other improvements over the arcade version, and in some cases even 3D graphics.

A port for the 3DO was being developed by New Level, but was canceled in 1996. Cited reasons for the cancellation include development delays which pushed the release date too far beyond the peak of Mortal Kombat 3's popularity and the fact that the Mortal Kombat franchise had no established presence on the console.

=== WaveNet ===
A network version of the game for the Williams Action Video Entertainment Network (WaveNet) titled Ultimate Mortal Kombat 3 WaveNet was planned, allowing for online multiplayer matches. It is the only arcade version to feature Noob Saibot as a playable character. It was tested only in the Chicago and San Francisco areas, and used a dedicated T1 line connected directly to Midway's Chicago headquarters. It is highly unlikely that any WaveNet test games were ever released to the public after the infrastructure was dismantled, and so there are no known ROM image dumps of this version. One of the reasons this version was not widely adopted was the cost of T1 lines at the time: the setup cost several thousand dollars per arcade installation, plus a few hundred dollars for each cabinet using the hardware. Williams' plan was to use WaveNet to upload new games and game updates, which they would provide to arcade owners for free in exchange for a cut of the games' revenues. The WaveNet version received its first full release as part of the Mortal Kombat: Legacy Kollection compilation in 2025.

=== Super NES ===
The Super Nintendo Entertainment System (SNES) version was developed by Avalanche Software and published by Williams Entertainment on October 11, 1996, in North America, and by Acclaim Entertainment in December 1996, in Europe. This version of the game uses the code from Sculptured Software's prior port of the original MK3 released a year earlier. The limitations of the system led to many cuts being made to fit everything in the SNES cartridge: the announcer no longer says the characters' names, Sheeva was removed, (Note: Despite Sheeva being removed, launching 8 vs. 8 Tournament Mode and selecting a random character select will sometimes select the icon for the endurance matches (a large E), which actually represents Sheeva. The graphics data for the character is not present, which renders her effectively invisible, but her moves can be performed; she is incredibly fast and very glitchy. Also, using her usually causes the game to crash after a number of moves.) only seven backgrounds are included, those being the five new arcade backgrounds in addition to The Rooftop and The Pit 3, with those two only being playable through the cheat menu codes, and Shao Kahn's Lost Treasures chest has only 10 boxes instead of 12. Also, many changes affect the game's finishing moves: Kitana's "Kiss of Death" only inflates the opponent's head, reusing the effect from Kabal's "Air Pump" Fatality; Sonya Blade's Friendship from MK3 is used, as opposed to her Friendship from the arcade version of UMK3; Ermac's head punch Fatality input is altered or non-existent and can only be done with one-button fatalities enabled; Scorpion's "Hellraiser" Fatality is different (he takes the opponent back to the Hell stage, where the opponent simply burns to ash). Animality finishing moves were also removed, while still keeping the Mercy move, which originally served as a requirement for Animalities in MK3. On the other hand, Brutalities were introduced; a finishing move in which the player attacks their opponent with a series of kicks and punches which result in the victim exploding. At the same time, some changes were actually improvements over the arcade version. Rain and Noob Saibot are made into playable characters for the first time and were given only babalities, brutalities, and stage fatalities for finishing moves. Mileena, Ermac, and Classic Sub-Zero are playable out of the box. Motaro and Shao Kahn are unlockable characters for two-player fights, although only one player can choose a boss at a given time. A cheat code allows access to three separate cheat menus, where the player can drastically alter gameplay, access hidden content, or view the characters' endings, among many other things.

=== Sega Genesis ===
The Sega Genesis version was developed by Avalanche Software and published by Williams Entertainment on October 11, 1996, in North America, and by Acclaim Entertainment in December 1996, in Europe. Much like the SNES port, this version of the game uses the code from Sculptured Software's prior port of the original MK3 released a year earlier. Due to the limitations of the system's hardware, the Sega Genesis port featured inferior graphics and sound to that of the SNES port. Like on the SNES, Sheeva was removed, Shao Kahn's treasure chest has only 10 boxes, the announcer no longer says the characters' names, Kitana's "Kiss of Death" only inflates heads, Scorpion's "Hellraiser" Fatality is different, Sonya's Friendship from Mortal Kombat 3 is used, and the game retains the Bank stage. (Note: Another leftover from MK3 that was not totally deleted was code data for the 'Endurance Mode', which is still accessible through a Game Genie code.) There were, however, several differences. Unlike the SNES version, the Genesis version features more stages: with the addition of the five new ones, it also features six of the original ones from MK3, including the Subway, Bank, Rooftop, Soul Chamber, The Temple, and The Pit 3. There are several additional cuts regarding special and finishing moves: both Animalities and Mercy were removed; Human Smoke shares Scorpion's combos, rather than having unique ones. It did, however, have exclusive features in comparison to the arcade. Rain and Noob Saibot are made playable characters but, unlike the SNES port, were only given brutalities for finishing moves. Motaro and Shao Kahn are also playable in 2-player mode, and Mileena, Ermac, and Classic Sub-Zero are playable without any need of codes. Brutalities are also included in this version. Shang Tsung can morph into Robot Smoke, Noob Saibot, and Rain, which is not possible in the arcades, while Nightwolf is given the Red Shadow shoulder move that was later used in MKT. This version also features a rendition of Pong entitled MK4, which is the same as the one that appeared in the Genesis/Mega Drive port of MK3.

=== Sega Saturn ===
The Sega Saturn version of Ultimate Mortal Kombat 3 was developed by British studio Eurocom and released in June 1996, with Williams Entertainment publishing it in North America and GT Interactive handling the European release. Eurocom had originally been commissioned to convert Mortal Kombat 3 to the Saturn, with the game intended to arrive several months after the PlayStation version. However, following the development of Ultimate Mortal Kombat 3, Eurocom proposed incorporating the additional content into its Saturn conversion. According to Mean Machines Sega, the change required several additional months of programming but was undertaken without further cost to Williams Entertainment.

In April 1996, Computer and Video Games reported that the Saturn conversion was approximately 90% complete, with the console set to receive the first home version of Ultimate Mortal Kombat 3. The conversion incorporated the arcade game's expanded character roster, additional finishing moves and multiplayer modes, including two-on-two battles and an eight-player tournament.

The Sega Saturn version was developed by Eurocom and published in June 1996 by Williams Entertainment in North America and by GT Interactive in Europe. It is based directly on the version of Mortal Kombat 3 that was released for the PlayStation and PC. It thus has the same graphical quality and menu system. Since the arcade intro sequence is missing, Rain does not appear in the game, yet the message Kombat Kode "Rain can be found in the Graveyard" is still displayed. It also contains several elements of MK3 that were removed for the arcade version of UMK3, such as "The Bank" level and Noob Saibot being a shadow Kano as in MK3 (not a black ninja as in the arcade version of UMK3). There are a few new Kombat Kodes, but several that were present in the arcade release do not work any longer. The secret characters can be unlocked via a secret options screen, eliminating the need to enter three separate Kombat Kodes to unlock them (this is much faster, especially since unlocked characters cannot be saved); the Kombat Kodes themselves were also shortened to have six slots instead of ten.

=== Mortal Kombat Advance ===
Mortal Kombat Advance is the title given to the Game Boy Advance port of the game, which was developed by Virtucraft and published by Midway Games in North America on December 12, 2001, and in Europe on March 1, 2002. This version is based on the SNES port, but each character (except for Noob Saibot and the bosses) has only one individual Fatality and one Friendship. Three hidden characters can be unlocked by completing any tower other than Novice: Human Smoke (Warrior), Motaro (Master), and Shao Kahn (Grand Master). The GBA control system features two fewer buttons than those used in UMK3, which results in many special moves' button sequences being consolidated or changed. The violence in this game was toned down due to a younger fanbase using the GBA (though the game is still rated "M for Mature") and there is less blood.

=== PlayStation 2 ===
On all "Premium Edition" copies of the PlayStation 2 version of 2006's Mortal Kombat: Armageddon, a near arcade-perfect version of the game is included in the first disc. However, it is impossible to save unlocked characters in this version without accessing the EJB menu.

=== Xbox Live Arcade ===
The Xbox Live Arcade version has very few differences from the arcade original. There are some minor glitches in the network play on Xbox Live and there is no option to save the Kombat Kode unlocked characters. Online leaderboards were created to keep track of all time network stats and friends, the screen size was adjustable for anything between 4:3 and 16:9 televisions, and unlockable Achievements were also included. The game was accidentally released by Midway on the digital download service on the Friday evening of October 20, 2006, but was quickly pulled about 20 minutes later. According to Xbox Live director of programming, Major Nelson, an emergency meeting was called to discuss what to do about the game's release, knowing some keen users had already purchased the game. The decision was made to go on and release the game on the next morning, four days before its scheduled release date. As of 2010, it remained as the only post-launch XBLA game to be released on any day other than Wednesday. As of June 2010, the game cannot be downloaded as it was removed from XBLA due to "publisher evolving rights and permissions". Those who have purchased the game before this date can re-download and play online.

=== Nintendo DS ===
On June 27, 2007, MK co-creator Ed Boon officially confirmed a Nintendo DS port entitled Ultimate Mortal Kombat. The game, developed by Other Ocean Interactive and published by Midway Games on November 12, 2007, in North America and on December 7, 2007, in Europe, is an arcade-perfect port of UMK3, and includes Wi-Fi play and brings back the "Puzzle Kombat" minigame from Mortal Kombat: Deception. Additionally, when unlocking Ermac, Mileena, and Classic Sub-Zero with Kombat Kodes on the VS screen, they will remain unlocked, thanks to the inclusion of player profiles.

=== Mobile (J2ME) ===
In December 2010, EA Mobile released a Java-based port of the game for mobile phones. The game features only six playable fighters (Cyrax, Liu Kang, Scorpion, Sub-Zero, Sonya, and Kitana) and a single boss character (Shao Kahn).

=== iOS ===
In December 2010, Electronic Arts published their remake of the game for iOS. It features a wireless two-player mode that could function over either Wi-Fi or Bluetooth connections. Although the gameplay remains true to the 2D original, the digitized sprites of the arcade machine were replaced with 3D rendered graphics. Control was implemented via an on-screen joystick and buttons, utilizing the iOS-based devices' capacitive touchscreen. Network communication allowed for scores to be posted online, and a simplified control scheme was also included to improve accessibility. The character roster was incomplete, featuring only nine playable characters (Sub-Zero, Scorpion, Kitana, Nightwolf, Jax, Sheeva, Sonya, Liu Kang, and Stryker). Success at playing the game would unlock two additional fighters (Ermac and Jade). Both boss characters were included as CPU-only opponents. The game also features achievements. In June 2011, EA updated it to include the full roster and six new arenas.

=== Mortal Kombat Arcade Kollection ===
The game is a part of the digital release package Mortal Kombat Arcade Kollection, developed by Other Ocean Interactive and NetherRealm Studios and published by Warner Bros. Interactive for the PC, PlayStation 3 and Xbox 360 in 2011. Arcade Kollection also includes the first Mortal Kombat and Mortal Kombat II.

=== Arcade1Up ===
In 2019, Arcade1Up released a home arcade cabinet that included Ultimate Mortal Kombat 3, alongside Mortal Kombat and Mortal Kombat II.

=== Mortal Kombat: Legacy Kollection ===
The 2025 compilation Mortal Kombat: Legacy Kollection features multiple versions of Ultimate Mortal Kombat 3, including the arcade, SNES, Advance, and WaveNet versions.

== Reception ==
=== Critical response ===
Reception

Aggregate scores
| Aggregator | Score |
|---|---|
| GameRankings | X360: 68% DS: 73% |
| Metacritic | X360: 70/100; DS: 73/100 iOS: 54/100 |

Review scores
| Publication | Score |
|---|---|
| AllGame | 3.5/5 (SSAT) |
| Computer and Video Games | SMD, SNES & SSAT: 4/5 |
| Electronic Gaming Monthly | SSAT: 8.625/10; SNES: 8/10, 6/10, 7/10, 6.5/10 |
| Next Generation | Arcade & SSAT: 3/5 |
| TouchArcade | iOS: 3.5/5 |
| VideoGames & Computer Entertainment | SSAT: 8/10 |
| Maximum | SSAT: 4/5 |
| Sega Saturn Magazine | SSAT: 91% |

Reviewing the arcade version, a Next Generation critic expressed concern that the Mortal Kombat series was headed for the same rut Street Fighter had fallen into, in which unnecessary updates of the same game replaced new installments. He remarked that even the biggest change the game made, the four new characters, was rendered uninteresting by their recycling of the graphic sets of previous characters. However, he added that "To be fair, there is none of the MK quality, detail, or gameplay missing, just about everything you want is there." According to a later IGN retrospective, "the revision helped to win over some frustrated fans, but followers of Johnny Cage, Raiden, and Baraka remained perturbed."

Critical reception of the game has varied depending on the version under review. The initial releases were generally well-received by critics, especially the 32-bit Sega Saturn version. EGM named it their "Game of the Month", commenting that it is a "near-perfect" translation of the arcade version, with the only problem being the long loading times. VideoGames rated this port a review score of 8/10, calling it "simply a great game" and stating that "if there was ever a definitive MK game, this is it." GamePro summarized that "Saturn owners left out in the cold when MK 3 hit the PlayStation can now gloat: Ultimate has arrived, and it offers more fighters, moves, fatalities, and secrets than MK 3." While they criticized some elements of the game itself, such as the weak fatalities, they held that the Saturn conversion faithfully replicates the arcade game in every respect. A reviewer for Next Generation agreed that the Saturn version is an impeccable conversion apart from the "miserable necessity" of load times during Shang Tsung's morphs, but criticized Ultimate Mortal Kombat 3 for offering too little improvement over the original Mortal Kombat 3. While noting that since the original MK3 had never been released for the Saturn, the publishers could not be accused of trying to sell consumers the same game twice, he felt MK3 was a slapdash and unexciting entry in the Mortal Kombat series. Rich Leadbetter of Maximum commented that while Ultimate Mortal Kombat 3 does not measure up to contemporary Capcom fighters in terms of gameplay, it is unsurpassed in its huge number of secrets and replayability. He also praised Eurocom's conversion, saying it is a superior effort to Williams' conversion of MK3 for the PlayStation. Rad Automatic of Sega Saturn Magazine, like EGM and GamePro, praised the game's retention of the full content and quality of the arcade version, but also added, "Capcom have just released three bona fide awesome 2D beat 'em ups onto the Saturn, and ... I couldn't honestly say that I rate MK3 above them." A review by Computer and Video Games called it an "excellent conversion of a great coin-op", as well as "[e]ssential for fans, and something well worth consideration from all Saturn owners."

Reviewing the Genesis version, GamePro said the graphics and controls are solid by 16-bit standards, but the arcade version's voices and music are poorly reproduced, and the game offers too little beyond the previous installments of the series, all of which had already been released for Genesis. They summarized, "Mortal Kombat fans looking for a quick fix should enjoy UMK3, and players new to MK will find this game a treat. If you're looking for a new fighting game experience, however, you'll have to wait for MK4." They scored the Super NES version lower in fun factor but higher in graphics and sound, stating that this version duplicates the arcade game's voices and music very well. However, they repeated the central point that the game is essentially a slightly modified retread of Mortal Kombat 3. The four reviewers of Electronic Gaming Monthly likewise praised the quality of the Super NES conversion while noting that it offered little new for fans of the series. Dan Hsu in particular remarked, "Does anyone else feel a little cheated? After all, Mortal Kombat 3 was released for the SNES just a year ago. Now, we're getting Ultimate MK3 (a decent improvement over MK3) while a couple of other systems are getting Mortal Kombat Trilogy. Perhaps SNES carts can't hold enough memory to handle Trilogy. Even so, I wouldn't want to buy UMK3 knowing that a better MK package exists." The SNES version was nominated for Nintendo Power Awards '96 in the category "Best Tournament Fighting Game". Years later, Ultimate Mortal Kombat 3 was also named as the best retro Mortal Kombat game by Alex Langley of Arcade Sushi in 2013.

Ultimate Mortal Kombat for the Nintendo DS was given a review score of 7.8 out of 10 from IGN's Greg Miller, who wrote that "if all you want is a really solid, fun version of Mortal Kombat 3 that can go online, that's what you're going to get. It's good stuff all around." GameSpot's "Best and Worst of 2006" included the XBLA version among the five best fighting games of the year.

IGN rated the game 97th on its "Top 100 SNES Games of All Time". In 2018, Complex listed the game 68th in their "The Best Super Nintendo Games of All Time" writing: "Although not as jaw-dropping as MK2 was when it first came out on the SNES, this was still a great port of the arcade classic."

Ed Boon, one of the creators of the series, has stated Ultimate Mortal Kombat 3 to be his favorite Mortal Kombat arcade title.

=== Legal opinion ===
Ultimate Mortal Kombat 3 was one of the games cited by the U.S. Court of Appeals when striking down Indianapolis's attempt to ban violent video games in 2000, with Judge Richard Posner writing that "the game is feminist in depicting a woman as fully capable of holding her own in violent combat with heavily armed men. It thus has a message, even an 'ideology,' just as books and movies do," further writing that "The woman wins all the duels. She is as strong as the men, she is more skillful, more determined, and she does not flinch at the sight of blood."

=== Sales ===
Due in part to the Genesis and Super NES versions being delayed until the 1996 Christmas season, spawning rumors that they would never be released, those versions met with disappointing sales. However, it was the sixth best selling Genesis game in Brazil.

In the September 1996 issue of Computer and Video Games, the Sega Saturn version of Ultimate Mortal Kombat 3 ranked second on both the UK and American multi-format sales charts, debuting at that position in the UK. In the October 1996 issue, the Saturn version topped the magazine's American multi-format sales chart, before ranking fourth in the November issue.

== Legacy ==
Looking back now, we should [have] made the Genesis & Nintendo versions ALSO as Mortal Kombat Trilogy instead of selling 2 games at the same time.

— Ed Boon

Mortal Kombat Trilogy was released by Midway in 1996 as a follow-up to Ultimate Mortal Kombat 3. Unlike Ultimate Mortal Kombat 3, Mortal Kombat Trilogy was not released in arcades but was instead released for the Sony PlayStation, Nintendo 64, Sega Saturn and PC, as well as for the Game.com and R-Zone. Mortal Kombat Trilogy features the same gameplay and story, but includes all of the characters from the first three games, adding several completely new ones. Also, it introduces features such as the "Aggressor" bar, a meter that fills during the course of the match to make a player character faster and stronger for a short time, and the Brutality finishing moves (which were then incorporated into the Super NES and Genesis versions of Ultimate Mortal Kombat 3).

Ultimate Mortal Kombat 3 was also later remastered to be released as part of the Mortal Kombat Arcade Kollection in 2011.
