= Fatality (Mortal Kombat) =

Finishing move in Mortal Kombat

An example of a fatality from Mortal Kombat 11 (2019)

Fatality is a gameplay feature in the Mortal Kombat fighting game series, in which the victor of the match inflicts a brutally murderous finishing move onto their defeated opponent. Prompted by the announcer saying "Finish Him" or "Finish Her", players have a short time window to execute a Fatality by entering specific commands while positioned at a specific distance from the opponent. This triggers a cutscene in which the targeted enemy character is killed in an extremely brutal manner. Depending on the character being played and the button input, the sequence varies. A Fatality always marks the end of the entire match, whether done through standard play or a modifier.

The Fatality and its derivations are notable features of the Mortal Kombat series and have caused controversies.

== History ==
The origins of the Fatality concept have been traced back to several violent Asian martial arts media. In The Street Fighter (1974), a Japanese martial arts film, Sonny Chiba performs x-ray fatality finishing moves, which at the time was seen as a gimmick to distinguish it from other martial arts films. In the Japanese shōnen manga and anime series Fist of the North Star, the protagonist Kenshiro performs gory fatalities in the form of finishing moves which consist of attacking pressure points that cause heads and bodies to explode. The Japanese seinen manga and anime series Riki-Oh (1988 debut), along with its Hong Kong martial arts film adaptation Story of Ricky (1991), featured gory fatalities in the form of finishing moves similar to those that later appeared in Mortal Kombat. The nature of graphic violence depicted in Fatalities from the original Mortal Kombat was highly controversial and contributed to the formation of the Entertainment Software Rating Board (ESRB), a regulatory system for video game content. The impression of Fatality inspired other video game franchises to have finishing moves, including Killer Instinct, Gears of War, War Gods, and ClayFighter.

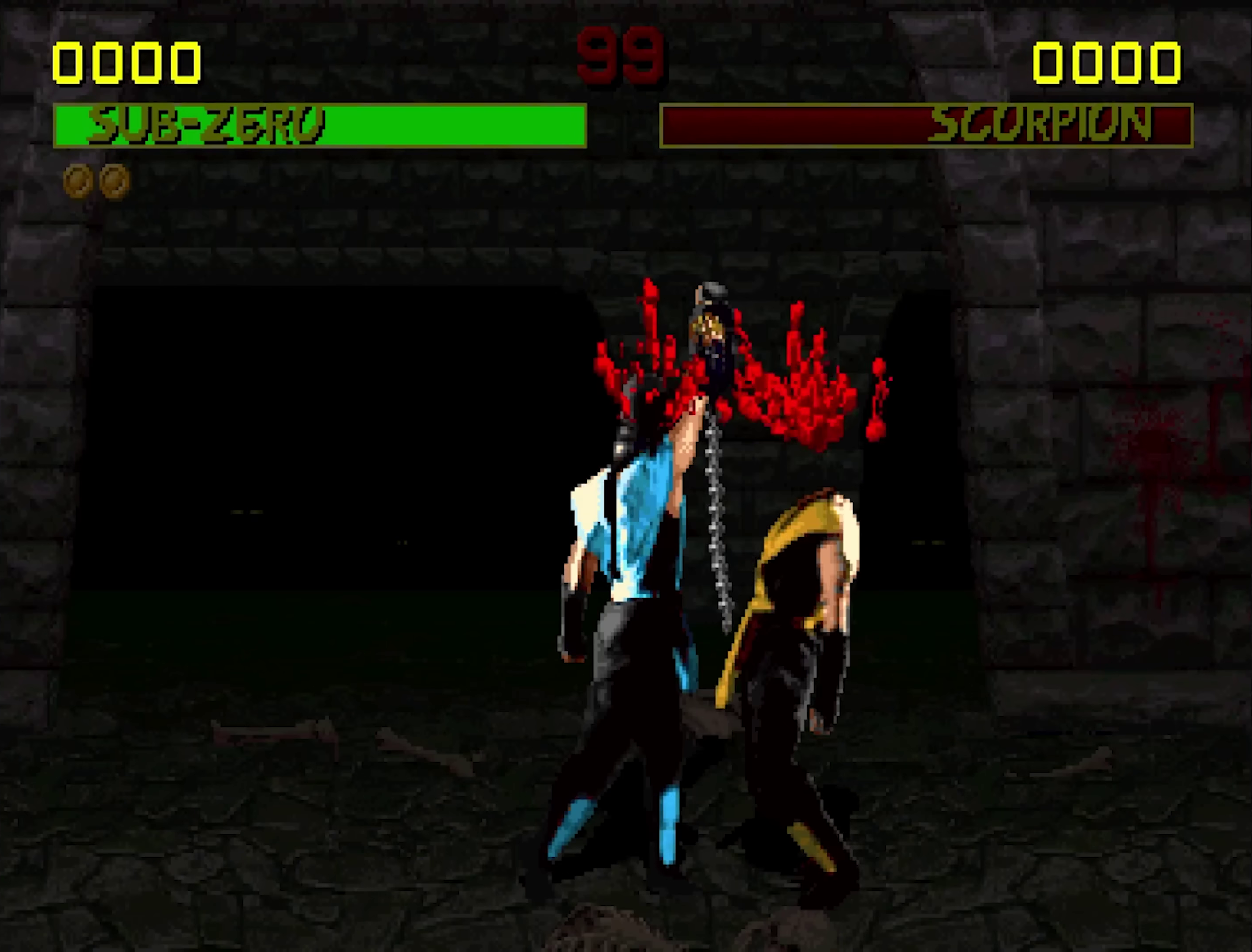
Fatality in the first Mortal Kombat game; Sub-zero beheading Scorpion

While creating Mortal Kombat, Ed Boon and John Tobias started with the idea of a Street Fighter II-style system and retained many of its conventions but tweaked others. The most notable additions were graphic blood effects, more brutal fighting techniques, and especially the fatal finishing moves (this was a novelty as the traditional fighting games ended with the loser simply knocked unconscious and the victor posing for the players). According to Boon, it started with an idea to enable the player to hit a dizzied opponent at the end of the match with a "free hit", and that idea "quickly evolved into something nasty". However, Tobias recalled it differently, stating that Fatalities were not initially part of the game's design. Early development focused on using a finishing move exclusively for the final boss, Shang Tsung, who was envisioned decapitating his opponent with a sword. This concept evolved when developers considered allowing players to perform similar finishing moves on their opponents. The positive reactions from players solidified Fatalities as a core mechanic of the game, leading to their prominence within the franchise. In Mortal Kombat 1 (2023), an accessibility feature for visually impaired individuals was made available, in which the properties of Fatalities are explained through in-game narration.

== Gameplay ==
Fatalities, like special moves, often have specific requirements. Each character has at least one unique Fatality that must be performed at a specific distance: close (right next to the opponent), sweep/mid (one or two steps away, within sweeping kick range), or far (about one jump's length away).

=== Alternatives ===
- Animality: Allows a character to morph into an animal and maul their opponent. Introduced in Mortal Kombat 3. According to Ed Boon, this finisher was rumored to be in Mortal Kombat II and was later added to Mortal Kombat 3 due to high fan demand.
- Babality: Introduced in Mortal Kombat II, it turns defeated opponents into an infant version of themselves.
- Brutality: Introduced in Ultimate Mortal Kombat 3, this involves a multi-hit combo that causes the opponent to explode. In the later games, Brutalities are tied to specific moves serving as finishing blows.
- Death Traps: Featured in Mortal Kombat: Deception, allowing players to kill opponents using interactive stage elements, but unlike Stage Fatalities, they can be executed at any point of a match.
- Faction Kill: Appearing only in Mortal Kombat X, this finisher aligns with the game's faction system, offering faction-themed finishing moves as a reward for allegiance to the respective faction.
- Fergality: The Sega Genesis version of Mortal Kombat II featured an exclusive finishing move that allowed Raiden to transform his opponent into Probe Ltd. employee Fergus McGovern. Acclaim was the publisher of the Genesis version.
- A "Friendship", which lets players finish a battle in a friendly manner; introduced in Mortal Kombat II (pictured)
  Friendship: This finishing move is an alternative to Fatalities, used for ending a match in a friendly manner.
- Hara-Kiri: Introduced in Mortal Kombat: Deception. It is a finishing move in which a losing player kills themselves rather than being finished by their opponent.
- Heroic Brutality: This is exclusive to the 2008 crossover game Mortal Kombat vs. DC Universe and is performed by DC heroes instead of a regular fatality, to represent their moral code against killing.
- Kreate-A-Fatality: For Mortal Kombat: Armageddon, the Fatality concept was completely revised, which focused more on combinations of attacks instead of character-specific finishers.
- Mercy: Allows players to spare opponents instead of finishing them.
- Multality: Mortal Kombat: Shaolin Monks features Multalities, which are Fatalities performed on multiple enemies simultaneously.
- Nudalities: Planned for Mortal Kombat 3, however, they were canceled by one of the game's publishers, Williams Entertainment.
- Seasonal Fatality: This concept of Fatality was introduced in Mortal Kombat 1, in which the Fatalities are themed around a special festival. Examples include Thanksgiving, Halloween, and Christmas.
- Stage Fatality: It brought environmental interaction within the series, occurring when a player uses a part of the stage to kill an opponent. Some examples of Stage Fatalities are having the victim fall into a pool of acid or a pit of spikes or colliding with a subway train.
- Quitality: Introduced in Mortal Kombat X, it occurs when a player disconnects during an online match. This results in losing a match and a character instantly dying or snapping their own neck.

== Notable Fatalities ==
In December 1994, GamePro conducted a reader poll to determine the most popular Fatalities from MKII. The results, published in March 1995, highlighted Jax's "Arm Rip", Sub-Zero's "Ice Grenade", and Shang Tsung's "Soul Stealer" as fan favorites. Years later, in November 2008, GamePro's Patrick Shaw ranked his "12 Lamest Fatalities" across various fighting games. Among those from the Mortal Kombat series from least to highest ranking were Liu Kang's "Death by Arcade Machine" (MK3), The Flash's "Tornado Slam" (MK vs. DCU), Jax's "Amazing Growing Man" (MK3), Scorpion's and Rain's Animalities (UMK3/MKT), Sindel's "Killer Hair" (MK3), Kano's "Stomach Pounce" (MK vs. DCU), and the censored Super NES version of his "Heart Rip" Fatality from the original Mortal Kombat.

In May 2010, Dan Ryckert from Game Informer reviewed the Fatalities, categorizing them into the best, worst, and most confusing. Best Fatalities: Sub-Zero's "Spine Rip" (MK 1992), Liu Kang's "Dragon", Reptile's "Head Snack", and Jax's "Arm Pull" (all three from MKII); Sektor's "Compactor" and Sindel's "Scream" (MK3); Jade's "Head Gymnastics" and Dairou's "Ribs to the Eyes" (MKD). Worst Fatalities: Liu Kang's "Cartwheel" (MK 1992), Kitana's "Kiss of Death" (MKII), Kabal's "Inflating Head" and "Scary Face" (MK3), Rain's "Upside-Down Uppercut" (MKT), Bo' Rai Cho's "Fart of Doom" (MKD), and Kano's "Knee Stomp" (MK vs. DCU). Confusing Fatalities: Johnny Cage's "Three Head Punch", Liu Kang's "Arcade Machine", Jax's "Giant Stomp", Cyrax's "Self-Destruct", Kano's "Skeleton Pull", and Smoke's "Blow Up The World" (all six from MK3), and Darrius' "Rearranger" (MKD).

In February 2011, UGO Entertainment's K. Thor Jensen ranked the top 50 "Most Gruesome Finishing Moves Ever" in video games, with several Mortal Kombat Fatalities making the list. The least to highest ranking Fatalities: Sub-Zero's "Spine Rip" (MK 1992), Johnny Cage's "Triple Uppercut" (MKII), the Joker's "Last Joke" (MK vs. DCU), Kung Lao's "Hat Slice" (MKII), Johnny Cage's "Nutbuster" (MKSM), the "Pit" Fatality, Sektor's "Iron Clamp" (MK3), Dairou's "Ribeyes" (MKD), and Smoke's "Armageddon" (MK3). In April 2014, Prima Games's Robert Workman compiled a list of the top 50 Fatalities. The order from top 10 to top 1 included Baraka's "Lifting Stab" (MKII), Noob Saibot's "Make a Wish" (MK9), Kitana's "Kiss of Death" (MKII), Johnny Cage's "Nut Buster" (MKSM), Ermac's "Mind Over Splatter" (MK9), the "Pit" Fatality, Dairou's "Eye Stab" (MKD), Kung Lao's "Blade Drag" (MK9), Kano's "Heart Rip" and Sub-Zero's "Beheading, Complete with Spine" (MK 1992).

In May 2020, Gavin Jasper of Den of Geek selected his top 3 Fatalities from each Mortal Kombat game, spanning the series from its original release to MK11. Highlights from the original Mortal Kombat included Kano's "Heart Rip", Scorpion's "Toasty", and Sub-Zero's "Spine Rip". From MKII: Mileena's "Devourer", Baraka's "Blade Elevation", and Kung Lao's "Hat Splitter". From MK3/UMK3/MKT: Sektor's "Compactor", Shang Tsung's "Soul Steal", and Scorpion's "Hell Hand". From MK4/MKG: Raiden's "Overload", Reiko's "Throwing Stars", and Quan Chi's "Leg Beatdown". From MKDA: Kano's "Organ Robbery", Kenshi's "Telekinetic Destruction", and Kung Lao's "Splitting Headache". From MKD/MKU: Goro's "Limb Tear", Havik's "Arm Feast", and Sub-Zero's "Leg Shatter". From MKSM: "The Tearing Down of Kintaro", Johnny Cage's "Crotch Destroyer", and Scorpion's "Judgment Day". From MK vs. DCU: The Joker's "Cards" and "Gun", and Scorpion's "Trip to Hell". From MK9: Kung Lao's "Hat Trick", Sheeva's "Lend a Hand", and Noob Saibot's "Make a Wish". From MKX: Quan Chi's "Mind Game", Mileena's "Tasty Treat", and Cassie Cage's "Selfie". Lastly, from MK11: The Terminator's "Target Terminated", D'Vorah's "New Species", and Johnny Cage's "Who Hired This Guy?".

In October 2022, Justin Clark of GameSpot celebrated the 30th anniversary of the Mortal Kombat series by selecting the 10 best and worst Fatalities in its history. Among the best were Sub-Zero's "Spine Rip" (MK 1992), Kung Lao's "Hat Split" and Shang Tsung's Kintaro transformation (MKII), Quan Chi's "Shake a Leg" (MK4), Sub-Zero's "The Pitch" (MKD), Scorpion's "Nether Gate" (MK9), Ermac's "Inner Workings" and Cassie Cage's "Selfie" (MKX), Shang Tsung's "Kondemned to the Damned" and D'Vorah's "New Species" (MK11). The worst included Liu Kang's "Cartwheel Uppercut" (MK 1992/MKII), Jade's "Shaky Staff" and Classic Sub-Zero's "Blackout" (UMK3), Quan Chi's "Neck Stretch" (MKDA), Scorpion's "Only a Flesh Wound" and Ashrah's "Voodoo Doll" (MKD), "Ultimate Fatalities" (MKA), Kano's "Stomp, Drop, and Roll" (MK vs. DCU), Cassie Cage's "I <3 You" and Skarlet's "Heart Condition" (MK11). Fatalities from 2023's MK1 have drawn critical attention, including Liu Kang's Fatality, where he transports his opponent to outer space and summons a black hole, and the "Thanksgiving" Fatality, described by Polygon's Michael McWhertor as the "most disgusting finishing move yet".
