= Raiden (Mortal Kombat) =

Mortal Kombat character

- Mortal Kombat character
- Raiden artwork by John Tobias for Mortal Kombat II (1993)
- First appearance: Mortal Kombat (1992)
- Created by: Ed Boon; John Tobias
- Designed by: John Tobias (early games); Luis Mangubat (MK:DA, MK:D, MK:A); Herman Sanchez (MKvs.DCU); Atomhawk Design (MK9)
- Voiced by: expand: Jon Hey (1992-1996) Ron Feinberg (1995 animated film) Clancy Brown (animated series); Ed Boon (MK4); Allan Stagg (MK:DA); Chase Ashbaker (2004–2005); Dan Bakkedahl (MK:SM); Rom Barkhordar (MK:A); Richard Epcar (2008–2020); Christopher Lambert (MK11, premier skin); Dave B. Mitchell (animated films); Travis Willingham (MKO, MK1) Vincent Rodriguez III (MK1)
- Portrayed by: expand: Michael Garvey (Mythologies); Christopher Lambert (1995 film); James Remar (Annihilation) Jeffrey Meek (television); Ryan Robbins (Legacy); David Lee McInnis (Legacy II); Tadanobu Asano (2021 film)
- Motion capture: Carlos Pesina (1992–2006); Sean Okerberg (MKvs.DCU)

In-universe information
- Origin: The Heavens (most media); Earthrealm (Fengjian, China) (MK1)

Raiden (Japanese: 雷電, /ˈreɪdɛn/ RAY-den), is a fictional character in the Mortal Kombat fighting game franchise by Midway Games and NetherRealm Studios. Based on the Japanese deity Raijin, he is depicted as the god of thunder who possesses control over lightning. He debuted in the original 1992 game and has appeared as a playable character in every main installment except Mortal Kombat 3 (1995) and its first update. In the storyline of the games, Raiden is the protector of Earthrealm. He fulfills his duty by selecting and training the warriors who defend Earthrealm from various threats, while also participating directly in the realm's defense. Raiden generally serves as a mentor figure to the franchise's heroes, although he sometimes assumes a darker role in the story, which sees him become more ruthless in his protection of the realm. In Mortal Kombat 1, the new main playable Raiden is depicted as a human who was raised at a farmland and becomes Earthrealm's current Mortal Kombat champion in Liu Kang's timeline, while his previous godly counterpart also exist as a Titan of his own timeline.

One of the franchise's central characters, Raiden has appeared in various related media outside of the Mortal Kombat games, including guest appearances in NBA Jam Tournament Edition (1995), NFL Blitz (1997), Unreal Championship 2 (2005), and Injustice 2 (2017).

The character was inspired by multiple Japanese game designer John Tobias explored in the making of the franchise. However, Raiden's biggest inspiration came from the Western film Big Trouble in Little China. Raiden has generally received a positive reception and is among the series' most popular characters for his design and special abilities. Though his role has been called repetitive, multiple journalists reviewing the games' narrative have welcomed his transformation into the more ruthless Dark Raiden.

== Creation ==
As designer John Tobias was seeking inspiration for more characters in Mortal Kombat, he visited the Field Museum of Natural History and in their Japanese artifacts display of the Asian antiquities wing, he found a statue of the Raijin, and decided that the game needed a Japanese thunder god. On his research of the Raijin, Tobias decided to take in the deity's alternate spelling of Raiden, and seeing that the traditional Shinto Raijin was usually portrayed as a small, red-skinned demon-like creature that beats a drum to create thunder, opted to employ a different design. Tobias took inspiration from the character Lightning from the film Big Trouble in Little China, a warrior who can conjure lightning and wears a conical hat.

Raiden's name was spelled "Raiden" in all of the original arcade games and in every game since Mortal Kombat 4. However, the PC and console ports released until Mortal Kombat Trilogy, along with both movies and the TV series, changed the name to "Rayden", fearing the original spelling would lead to trademark issues from Seibu Kaihatsu's shoot 'em up game also named Raiden. Ed Boon personally hated that Acclaim spelled it with a Y.

In an interview featured in Deception, Ed Boon said that the hat that actor Carlos Pesina wore to portray the character in the earlier Mortal Kombat games was ruined as a result of Pesina repeatedly performing falls during production. Raiden was voiced by Midway employee Jon Hey in the first two games. He became well known for yelling randomly while performing his "Torpedo" move (aka "the Superman move"). Fans originally believed that he was yelling in Japanese, while others believed it to be mangled English phrases such as "Your momma's from LA", or "Santa Monica!". Tobias revealed that Raiden was merely speaking gibberish and not actual Japanese, as it was originally intended.

Raiden was originally going to use his staff as a weapon already in Mortal Kombat II, but Midway was forced to scrap it due to memory constraints. He was unplayable in Mortal Kombat 3 where he appeared in the attract mode to state that he was forbidden from participating in the game's conflict. He also appeared as part of Nightwolf's Friendship, which saw Nightwolf transform into Raiden alongside a Mortal Kombat II arcade cabinet. The Friendship would include one of two quotes, "I've never seen a Kano transformation", or "No, But I Can Do a Raiden Transformation", both of which were based on false reports that Kano was secretly playable in Mortal Kombat II and Raiden likewise in Mortal Kombat 3. After Raiden became playable in the update Mortal Kombat Trilogy, the Nintendo 64 version changed the Friendship.

== Appearances ==
=== Mortal Kombat games ===
==== Midway games ====
In the original Mortal Kombat, Raiden is invited to compete in the titular tournament by its grandmaster sorcerer Shang Tsung. Raiden accepts and takes on a human form to compete. In Raiden's non-canonical ending, his powers enable him to easily win the tournament against his mortal competition, so he invites other gods to take part in an increasingly destructive competition which eventually destroys Earthrealm (such event is at odds with his role as Earthrealm's protector in the series).

In Mortal Kombat II, watching events unfold from above, Raiden realizes Outworld emperor Shao Kahn's intentions. He warns the surviving members of the original tournament, Liu Kang and Kung Lao, of Shao Kahn's threat before venturing to Outworld. Despite Shao Kahn taking almost every soul on Earth as his own, Raiden was able to protect the souls of Liu Kang and other chosen warriors. Initially unable to participate due to the merger of Outworld and Earthrealm, Raiden sacrifices his immortality in order to help his chances against the Kahn after the Elder Gods refuse to assist him in Mortal Kombat Trilogy.

In the spin-off, Raiden sends Sub-Zero to the Netherealm to find a divine amulet. In Mortal Kombat 4, following Outworld's failed invasion, Shinnok, with the aid of Quan Chi, again sought to rise from the Netherealm and conquer the other realms. However, with Liu Kang again uniting Earthrealm's warriors, Raiden's Forces of Light emerge successful. Now granted the status of Elder God, Raiden turns over his position as Earthrealm's protector to his brother, the wind god Fujin. However, Raiden returns to the battlefield in Mortal Kombat: Deadly Alliance, Raiden could not interfere when the titular alliance of Shang Tsung and Quan Chi kill Liu Kang due to his Elder God status. Disgusted by his fellow Elder Gods for their refusal to intervene, Raiden relinquishes his position and gathers his allies to stop the sorcerers.

In Mortal Kombat: Deception, Raiden is defeated by the Deadly Alliance himself. When Onaga awakens, Raiden releases his godly essence, resulting in an enormous explosion that kills the alliance, but fails to harm Onaga. Raiden's essence soon gathers again in Earthrealm, albeit corrupted and reformed into a darker variant of himself. Raiden has become furious with the way Earthrealm's inhabitants had treated their realm, which increases once he learns that Shujinko had foolishly unleashed the Dragon King. With his patience exhausted, Raiden chooses to take matters into his own hands. Exhuming Liu Kang's corpse, he takes it to an underground temple that belonged to the Houan, an ancient sect of necromancers whom he had destroyed centuries earlier, and revives his former ally.

Despite being aware of the former's deceptive nature, Raiden accepts in an attempt to secretly uncover Shinnok's plans. Raiden's role in Armageddon is further expanded in the Konquest mode of Mortal Kombat: Armageddon, when he encounters Taven and reveals to him that he had struck a deal with Shao Kahn, agreeing to let the Emperor conquer and rule all other realms so long as Earthrealm was left alone. In return, Raiden agreed to hunt and eliminate Taven for the Kahn so that he could claim Blaze's godlike power for himself. Raiden confronts Taven, only to be defeated. Raiden would later fight against Shao Kahn when the two became the last surviving warriors. The latter emerged victorious, but the former was able to send a message to his past self before Shao Kahn could finish him off.

In the crossover fighting game Mortal Kombat vs. DC Universe, Raiden fights Shao Kahn until the former sends him into a portal that causes the latter to fuse with Darkseid and turn them into Dark Kahn, which in turn fuses the Mortal Kombat and DC Universes. Despite clashes with members of the Justice League, Raiden works with Superman to defeat Dark Kahn and undo the fusions; later imprisoning Darkseid in the Netherrealm. In his arcade ending, Raiden returns to his realm to find that exposure to his world's sun has weakened him greatly. Quan Chi offers him a jade amulet of unknown origin that can restore his powers.

==== Netherealm Studio games ====
In the 2011 Mortal Kombat reboot, Raiden's past self receives an ominous vision from his future self and works to avert the events of Armageddon. Although he succeeds and kills Shao Kahn with the assistance of the Elder Gods, his decisions resulted in many of Earthrealm's defenders, including Liu Kang, being killed and turned into Quan Chi's undead revenants.

In Mortal Kombat X, Raiden and Fujin join forces to defend the sky temple from Shinnok, Quan Chi, and the revenants. In the process, they manage to defeat the fallen Elder God and trap him in his amulet as well as revive the fallen Jax, Sub-Zero, and Scorpion. Twenty years later, Raiden discovers Shinnok's amulet was stolen and works with Earthrealm's new defenders to retrieve it. However, he fails to stop Quan Chi from releasing Shinnok, who takes Raiden prisoner so he can corrupt Earthrealm's Jinsei. After Cassie Cage defeats the Elder God, she helps Raiden purify the Jinsei by drawing Shinnok's energy into him, though he becomes corrupted in the process. Following this, Raiden confronts the Netherrealm's new rulers, Liu Kang, and Kitana, and presents them with Shinnok's severed head to prove he will show no mercy to those who threaten Earthrealm.

In Mortal Kombat 11, having used Shinnok's amulet to become Dark Raiden once more, he leads an assault on the Netherrealm with the Special Forces to destroy their cathedral and succeed. In doing so however, he unknowingly angered the keeper of time and Shinnok's mother, Kronika, who decides to rewrite history to undo his interference. She creates a time storm that erases Dark Raiden from history, but brings a younger version of him from the past due to his being immortal. The present Raiden works with the Special Forces to defeat Kronika, only to learn that the Elder Gods had been killed. As a result, Raiden slowly gives into his dark impulses and uses Shinnok's amulet to empower himself like his future self did. When his version of Liu Kang tries to stop him from attacking Scorpion, Raiden sees visions of other timelines where they fought and realizes Kronika manipulated them all because she fears his and Liu Kang's combined power. Once Kronika learns of this, she kidnaps Liu Kang. Along the way, he confronts Liu Kang's revenant and merges with him and the past Liu Kang to become Fire God Liu Kang, who goes on to defeat Kronika. Once he does so, a mortal version of Raiden joins Liu Kang to advise him on forging a new history since the battle took them to the beginning of time. In the DLC story expansion, Aftermath, the mortal Raiden attempts to stop Shang Tsung after he approaches them and claims they cannot use Kronika's Hourglass without her Crown of Souls, though Liu Kang allows the sorcerer to go back in time to retrieve a past version of it. Shang Tsung betrays them and steals their souls. The story has two endings: One with Liu Kang managing to stop Shang shortly afterward and begins rewriting history, and one with Shang winning, absorbing Liu Kang's power, and making Dark Raiden his servant.

In the new timeline depicted in Mortal Kombat 1, Raiden and Liu Kang have swapped roles with the latter now rewriting history as the God of Fire and the former now as an Earthrealm champion that Liu Kang must train to compete in Outworld's tournament. This version of Raiden grew up as a field worker in the village of Fengjian alongside Kung Lao trained in martial arts by Madame Bo. After becoming Earthrealm's primary champion for the tournament, Raiden is given by Liu Kang an amulet that grants him his lightning powers, and ultimately wins the tournament at Outworld. During the game's climax, which reveals Titan Shang Tsung from Aftermath's ending as the game's main antagonist, other versions of Raiden from different timelines appear, including Dark Raiden from Titan Shang Tsung's timeline, and a version that became a Titan himself after defeating Kronika that aids Liu Kang in stopping him. After learning of his godly counterparts and past iterations, Raiden learns that Liu Kang made him mortal in the new timeline to prevent him from being consumed by rage and becoming Dark Raiden. Believing rage may be necessary for the coming battles ahead, Raiden begins training with Kuai Liang/Scorpion, to learn how to master it at a newly found Shirai-Ryu, and thanking Liu Kang for not only helping him learn the truth, but also find a new life and vow to stop his dark self. Several months later during the Khaos Reigns expansion storyline, when Liu Kang and Geras received an emergency call at Outworld by a newly elected Empress Mileena, Raiden is entrusted to pronounce Scorpion and Harumi Shirai's marriage on their wedding day since, and informs his ally that Bi-Han/Sub-Zero was responsible for helping the now fugitive Shao and his rebel army escaped.

=== Other games ===
Raiden also appears as a secret character in NBA Jam Tournament Edition, NFL Blitz, and Unreal Championship 2: The Liandri Conflict. He was a playable DLC guest character alongside Sub-Zero in Injustice 2. On March 29, 2025, Raiden was added as a purchasable skin in Fortnite Battle Royale alongside fellow fighters Scorpion and Kitana, with Sub-Zero already existing in the current season's battle pass.

=== Other media ===
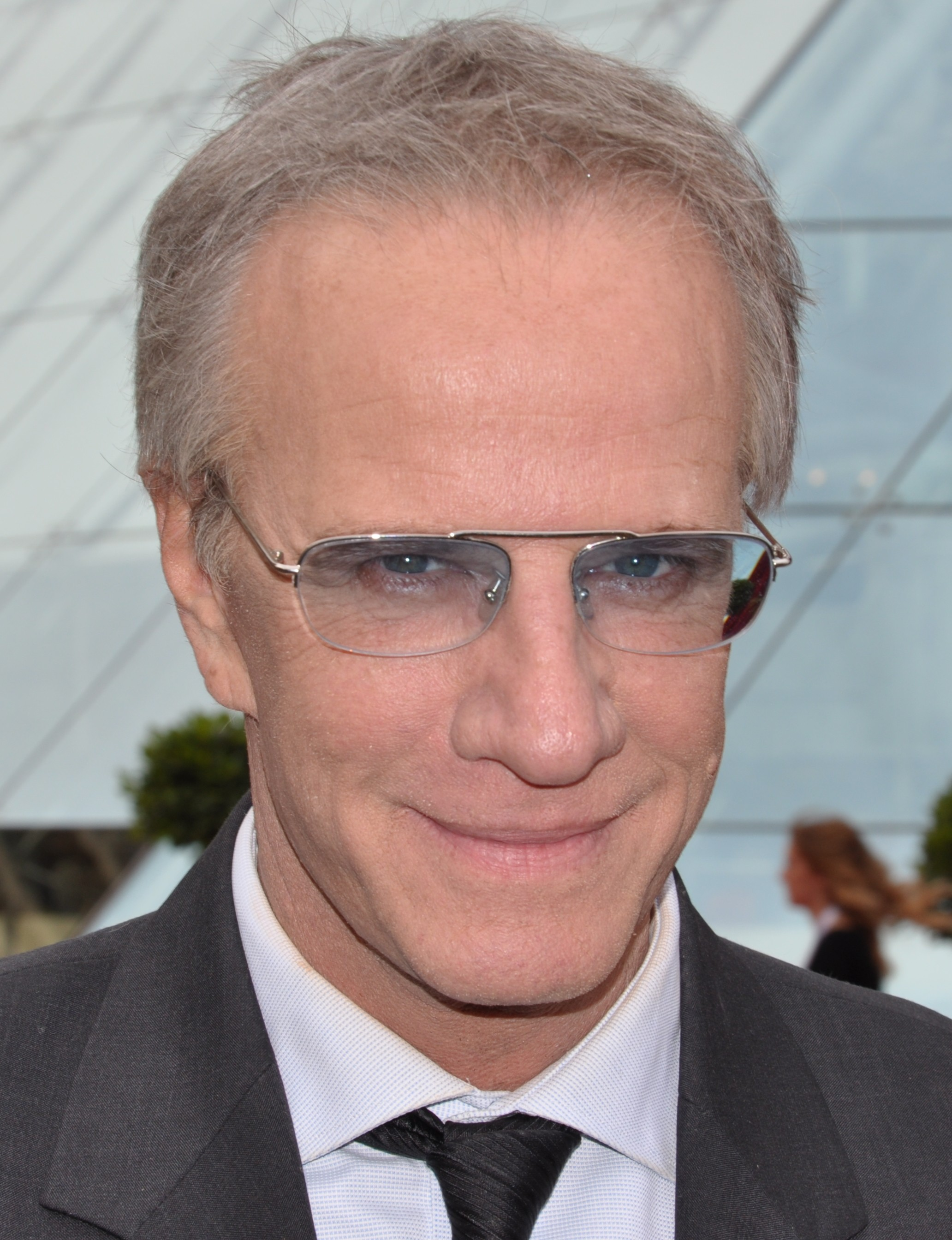
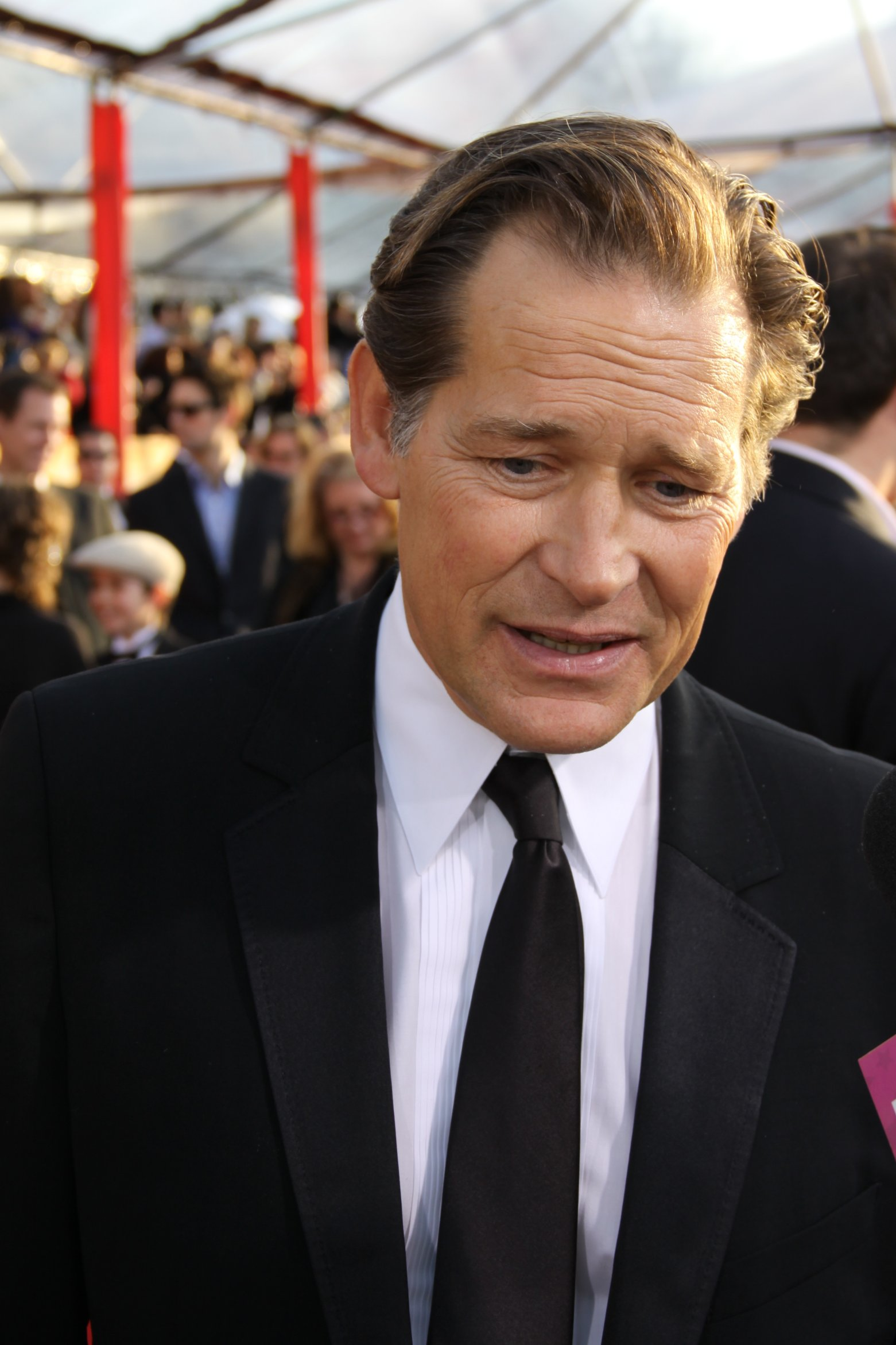
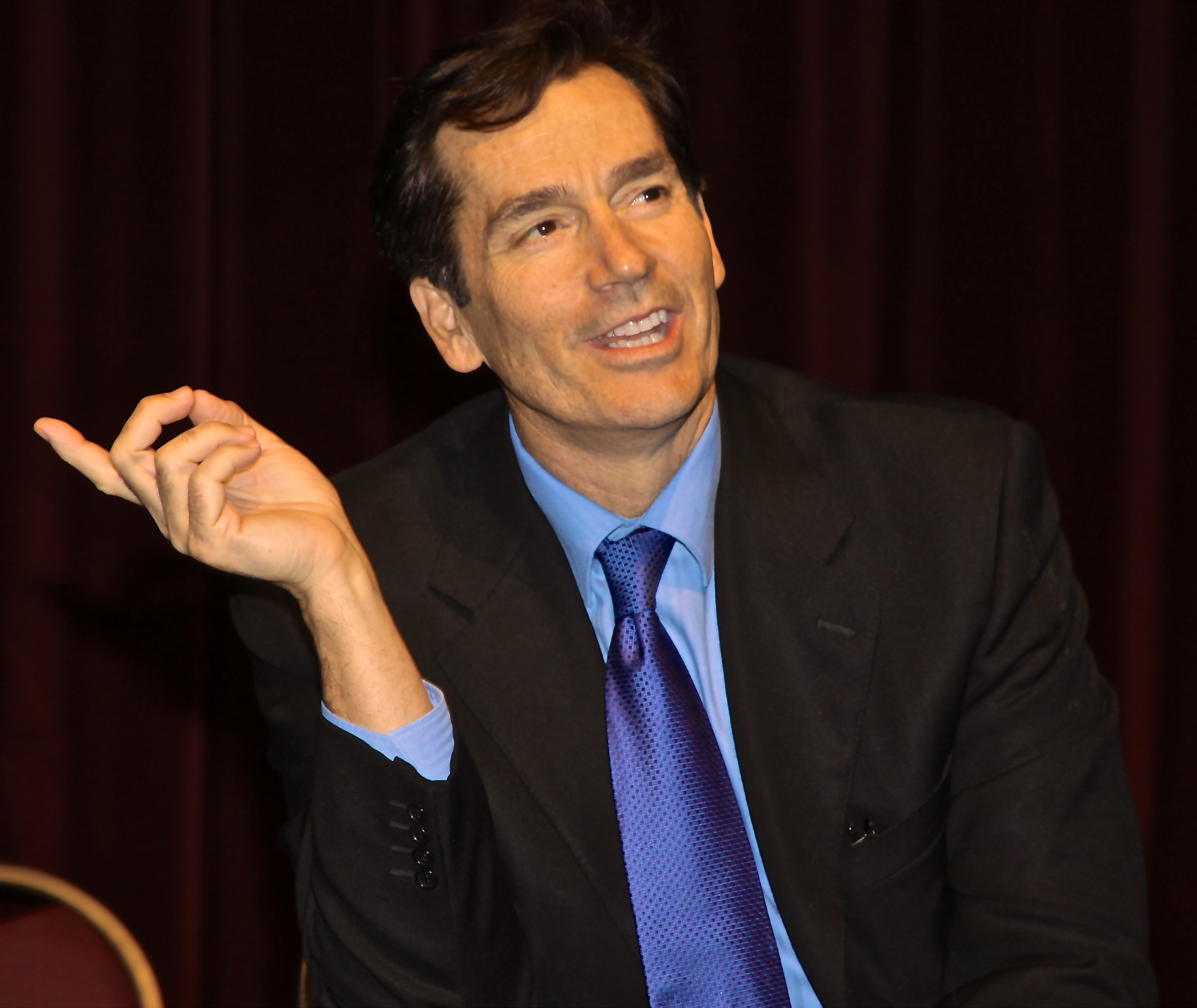
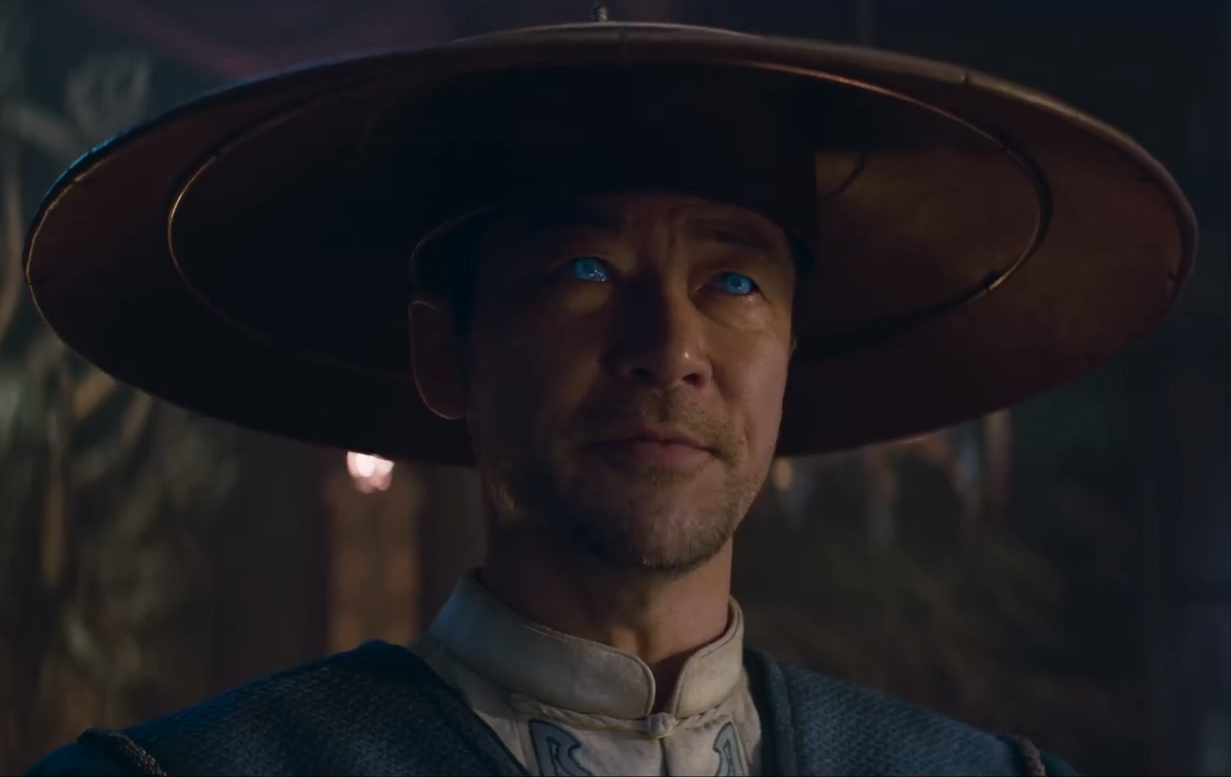
Raiden has been portrayed by Christopher Lambert, James Remar, Jeffrey Meek, and Tadanobu Asano.

Raiden appears in the Mortal Kombat comic books in his usual role as the guide and mentor of the Earthrealm warriors. He and Shang Tsung were often portrayed as bitter enemies, and he was forbidden from intervening in the mortals' affairs, as shown when Johnny Cage was to answer one of the questions in the Tao Te Zhan. However, in a departure from the storyline of the first game, he was not allowed to participate in the tournament in the miniseries Blood & Thunder, due to his godly status.

Raiden co-starred in his own three-issue miniseries Rayden & Kano. In this miniseries, it is stated that, while his fellow gods stay out of mortal affairs, Raiden never remains silent, and always tries to give the good side an advantage in the eternal struggle. Raiden saved Kano's life and attempted to give him a sword called "Ebbonrule", which drew strength from an evil man who turned to the side of good. Raiden hoped Kano would slay Shao Kahn using the sword's power, but Kano gave the sword to Shao Kahn instead in exchange for godlike powers, which left Raiden to realize that his actions would never tip the balance of good and evil. During the last Tournament Edition issue, Raiden commandeered the group of heroes in Shao Kahn's tournament. He ultimately sacrificed himself to save the team from an ambush by Kano, Kintaro, Goro and Smoke. Raiden was depicted as having two female servants, named Wynd and Rayne.

In the first Mortal Kombat movie, Raiden, who is played by Christopher Lambert, is disallowed from participating in the tournament, but remains the guiding god of thunder, bent on doing all within his power to help Earth's chosen warriors gain victory. His wardrobe consisted of a robe which hides his attire from the first game (his rain hat was worn only once at the beginning of the film). His eyes occasionally displayed his true nature and he was seen teleporting only once. Raiden also possessed a dry sense of humor that was sometimes lost on the other characters, often prompting him to apologize after making dry remarks. According to the 'Making of Mortal Kombat' published by New Line Cinema, Raiden's role was "to protect the Earth Warriors and make sure Shang Tsung's forces don't cheat to win". On the ship taking all tournament contestants to Tsung's island, Raiden informed the Earth warriors that he had looked into all their souls, and one of three would decide the outcome: Liu Kang, Johnny Cage or Sonya Blade. Raiden also appeared in the animated film Mortal Kombat: The Journey Begins as the guide of the protagonists voiced by Randy Hamilton.

Raiden was played by James Remar in the 1997 sequel, Mortal Kombat Annihilation. He is much more involved in the action of the film, besting Shao Kahn and threatening to kill his generals in his first action scene. By consulting the Elder Gods, he sacrifices his immortality to reunite with Queen Sindel, closing Kahn's invasion of Earthrealm and violating the rules of Mortal Kombat. In the end, he became an Elder God in the place of his father.

Jeffrey Meek played Raiden in the live-action series Mortal Kombat: Conquest. Unlike his film and game incarnations, this Raiden is far more upbeat, with a sarcastic personality making him less aloof toward humans. He was Kung Lao's mentor since childhood, and constantly reminds the young warrior of his duty to find new fighters to protect Earthrealm and to prepare for the next Mortal Kombat tournament. Meek also played Shao Kahn in the show and the final episode featured a stand off between both characters played by the same actor.

Raiden was a main character in the 1996 animated series Mortal Kombat: Defenders of the Realm, and was voiced by Clancy Brown.

Raiden is one of the many reimagined series characters in director Kevin Tancharoen's Mortal Kombat: Legacy web series, featured in one episode of the 2011 first season and portrayed by Ryan Robbins. He crashed lands onto Earth to participate in the Mortal Kombat tournament but lands within the bounds of a mental hospital. He is found by a young female patient named Blue, whom he befriends, and taken in by orderlies. After three months of therapy, his doctor believes that Raiden is still under the delusion that he is the God of Thunder. He is swiftly lobotomized, but due to his supernatural abilities, recovers from it. He attempts to escape but is lobotomized once again. Blue finds him and locks the door to the room, and Raiden tells her to stab him. After a tearful goodbye, Blue stabs him, causing him to disintegrate into lightning and smoke. Raiden reappears elsewhere and takes his signature hat from an old Chinese man. David Lee McInnis played Raiden minus this background in the 2013 second season.

Dave B. Mitchell voiced Raiden in the 2020 animated film Mortal Kombat Legends: Scorpion's Revenge and the 2021 sequel Mortal Kombat Legends: Battle of the Realms.

Tadanobu Asano played Raiden in the 2021 reboot film Mortal Kombat and the 2026 sequel Mortal Kombat II.

== Reception ==
Raiden's corruption as reflected in his dark design was noted for being a potential villain in the series until his role in Mortal Kombat 11.

Raiden is often included on the list of the top characters of the Mortal Kombat franchise. He was ranked as the 10th best character from the series by UGO.com, who praised him as one of the iconic characters from the franchise. He was sixth in Game Revolution's ranking of top ten "old school" Mortal Kombat characters, noting him for his gibberish and the Fergality. Some critics have condemned the Mortal Kombat series racist, especially regarding its Asian characters. Guy Aoki, the president of the advocacy group Media Action Network for Asian Americans, rebuked Mortal Kombat II in 1994 for allegedly perpetuating existing stereotypes of Asians as martial arts experts including Raiden. Allyne Mills, publicist for the game's publisher Acclaim Entertainment, answered: "This is a fantasy game, with all different characters. This is a martial arts game which comes from Asia. The game was not created to foster stereotypes." The characters' racial diversity and the inclusion of female characters were also criticized by the psychologists Patricia Marks Greenfield and Rodney R. Cocking in their 1996 book Interacting with Video, writing they "cannot assume that this greater diversity represents a more progressive identity politics, for one could argue that it merely increases the racist and sexist potential of the individual fights."

In 2011, UGO ranked his hat as the 14th coolest headgear in video games and commented "Kung Lao's got a slick topper that he can also use as a weapon, but Lord Raiden's conical straw hat is untouchable." It was ranked as having the fourth best headwear in video gaming by GamePro in 2009. In 2011, Paste listed Raiden's Fatality in the 2011 Mortal Kombat game as the sixth best from that game, and his Fatality from the original Mortal Kombat as the second-best from that game. In 2012, Complex ranked him as the 32nd "most dominant" fighting game character.

IGN found that Mortal Kombat made the story of Raiden and forces too repetitive as they always defeat the villains in the first four stories. With the villains defeating the heroes for the first time in Deadly Alliance, the story becomes "messy" leading Raiden "hit the reset button" and redo everything with Neatherealm's first reboot of the series. Instead of saving the world, IGN noticed Raiden continued making failures to the point he kills Liu Kang when realizing the last words of his future persona before dying. Polygon believes both Raiden and Liu Kang "fell from grace" in 2000s with Raiden becoming corrupt in the first Mortal Kombat timeline and later accidentally kills his own subordinate Liu Kang in the second timeline Mortal Kombat. The eventual reenactment of Liu Kang's aggressive words towards Raiden led to praise as through this Raiden realizes how the two have been used to fight one another like in the first reboot, making a drastic change in two heroes at the same time. Shack News found that during the events of Mortal Kombat X, Raiden becomes corrupted again especially with his gruesome treatment of Shinnok and expected him to fight his underlings Liu Kang and Kitana again in Mortal Kombat 11. While Kronika was foreshadowed as the antagonist the heroes must face in Mortal Kombat 11, Shack News felt that Raiden wearing Shinnok's magic amulet might have a major impact in the narrative to the point he might turn into the actual villain. Medium also criticized Raiden's actions across his appearances until he redeems himself by redeeming the corrupted undead Liu Kang in Mortal Kombat 11.

Christopher Lambert as Lord Rayden has also received positive coverage with JoBlo.com commenting that he "lent the production maturity and star power" while CBR mentioned that he "steals every scene he appears, delivering ridiculous lines like, 'The fate of billions depends upon you,' before laughing and apologizing". Den of Geek saw potential for Tadanobu Asano as Raiden due to the actor being highly popular in 47 Ronin, Battleship, and the Thor films to the point he Asano feels uniquely capable of playing the thunder god. They said he "embodies the character so clearly that he's already got his eye on the out of universe competition". Sensacine criticized Raiden's work in the reboot movie as his limitation on interfering with Shang Tsung's soldiers is not consistent in the film.

In regards Legacy, Houston Press praised of the series' devotion to character development upon the release of Raiden's episode. They stated that while the martial arts took a backseat, the drama of Raiden's "Christlike" story was well-executed, giving audiences a reason to identify with his character in a way the franchise has never been able to do. IGN said that praised the dual nature he is seen in his torture and the horrorific he can be to the audience. Film School Rejects compared this take on Raiden to be different from previous stories like Marvel's Thor as it shows the hero in a darker situation than the Marvel superhero as he does not have a romantic situation but is instead trapped into a mental institution similar to the movie character Sarah Connor after Terminator. However, he still lamented the building of tension that would have made better drama for the Raiden's story.

== See also ==
- List of deities in fiction
