= Mortal Kombat Trilogy =

1996 video game

- North American cover art
- Developer: List: PlayStation Avalanche Software Nintendo 64 Leland Interactive Media (Note: The company is credited as its parent company Williams Entertainment.) Saturn, MS-DOS, Windows Point of View
- Publishers: Midway Home Entertainment: PlayStation, Nintendo 64, Saturn; NA: Midway Home Entertainment (Note: The company is credited as Williams Entertainment on Nintendo 64.); PAL: GT Interactive MS-DOS, Windows GT Interactive R-Zone, Game.com Tiger Electronics
- Producers: Michael Gottlieb; Michael Rubinelli
- Designers: Ed Boon; John Tobias
- Programmer: Ed Boon
- Artists: John Tobias; Steve Beran; Tony Goskie
- Composer: Dan Forden
- Series: Mortal Kombat
- Platforms: PlayStation, Nintendo 64, Sega Saturn, MS-DOS, Windows, R-Zone, Game.com
- Release: October 11, 1996: PlayStation; NA: October 11, 1996; PAL: December 9, 1996 Nintendo 64; NA: November 12, 1996; PAL: March 14, 1997 Saturn; NA: August 8, 1997; PAL: November 14, 1997 MS-DOS, Windows; NA: September 1997; EU: 1997 R-Zone; NA: 1997 Game.com; NA: 1998
- Genre: Fighting
- Modes: Single-player, multiplayer

Mortal Kombat Trilogy is a 1996 fighting game released by Midway as the second and final update to Mortal Kombat 3 (the first being Ultimate Mortal Kombat 3) for the PlayStation, Nintendo 64, Sega Saturn and PCs. Further versions were also released for the Game.com and R-Zone. It features a similar basic gameplay system and the same story as Ultimate Mortal Kombat 3, but adds characters and stages restored from Mortal Kombat and Mortal Kombat II. New additions to the game included the "Aggressor" bar and the Brutality mechanic. The game was met with mixed to positive reviews upon release.

== Gameplay ==
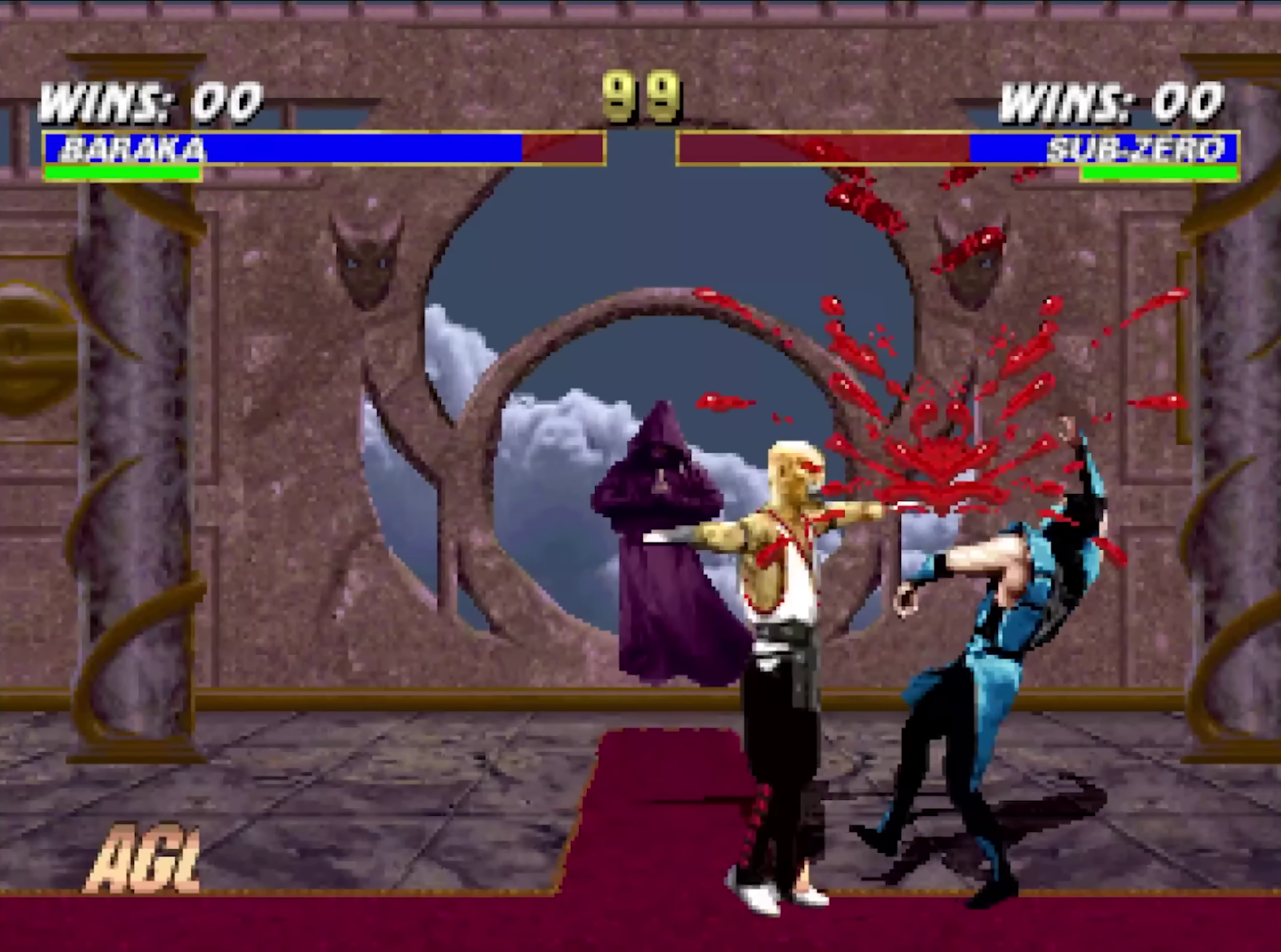
Baraka battling Sub-Zero. The HUD is the same as from MK3/UMK3, while the Aggressor bar is exclusive to MKT.

Mortal Kombat Trilogy introduces the "Aggressor" bar, which fills as the combatants fight (twice as much if the opponent is blocking). Once the bar is filled, it grants the character fast movement and greater attack damage for a short period of time.

Many characters gained additional special moves. Some were simple edits of existing moves (such as Stryker throwing two grenades instead of one), while others were unused animations never implemented in their intended previous games. These special moves included MK1 Kano's Knife Spin move, MKII Kung Lao's Air Torpedo, Goro's Spinning Punch move, Raiden's Lightning that shoots from behind the opponent, and Baraka's Blade Spin move. Additionally, Shao Kahn gained a throw and grab-and-punch move, and Motaro gained a proper throw move. Sub-Zero's famous "Spine Rip" Fatality reappears in the game but is completely censored, as the screen blacks out with only the "Fatality" text visible. This was due to avoid having to re-animate the fatality for this game.

Trilogy introduces the "Brutality" finishing move, which consists of repeatedly attacking the opponent until they explode. It was incorporated into the Mega Drive/Genesis and SNES ports of Ultimate Mortal Kombat 3, which were released the same month as Trilogy. All of the arenas that featured a Stage Fatality are featured in this game, except for the one in the Pit II, for similar reasons to the "Spine Rip" Fatality.

All of the battle arenas that were featured in MKII, MK3, and UMK3 are available in MKT, but only four backgrounds from the original Mortal Kombat are featured (Courtyard, Goro's Lair, the Pit, and the Pit Bottom). The PC, PlayStation, and Sega Saturn versions lack the Hidden Portal and Noob's Dorfen stages from MK3, while the Nintendo 64 version lacks Kahn's Arena and the Bank from MKII and MK3, respectively (though they were present in the beta version of the game).

== Characters ==
Character select screen from the CD versions of the game

Along with the Ultimate Mortal Kombat 3 roster, including those who were originally hidden and specific console exclusives in previous iterations, Trilogy adds Raiden and Baraka exactly as they appeared in Mortal Kombat II, with added running animations especially created for Mortal Kombat Trilogy. The actors of both characters were Carlos Pesina as Raiden (except for one sprite, which was portrayed by Sal Divita, who portrayed Sektor, Cyrax, Cyborg Smoke and Nightwolf), and Richard Divizio as Baraka (who also portrayed Kano and Kabal, including Noob Saibot only in MK3), respectively. Johnny Cage was also added to the roster, this time portrayed by Chris Alexander (replacing Daniel Pesina, Carlos' brother, who was legally at odds with Midway), making him the only non-secret character exclusive to this version of the game. He kept his moves from MKII except for the Split Punch, which was excluded since none of the characters from MK3/UMK3 had graphics for getting hit in the groin. Bosses Goro, Kintaro, Motaro and Shao Kahn are also playable characters from the start (except for the Nintendo 64 version, where only Motaro and Shao Kahn are included and must be unlocked prior to the start of a match in a fashion similar to Human Smoke on selected stage backgrounds). The PC, PlayStation and Saturn versions also contain alternate versions of Jax, Kung Lao, Kano and Raiden as they appeared in the first two titles. Unlike in Mortal Kombat II, MK1 Raiden, MK1 Kano, MK2 Jax, and MK2 Kung Lao in this game did not get proper running animations and simply utilize a sped-up version of their walk animation when they try to run.

Two new secret characters appear as well, depending on the version of the game. Most versions have Chameleon, a semi-transparent ninja who rapidly switches between all the other male ninjas (Classic Sub-Zero, Scorpion, Noob Saibot, Human Smoke, Rain, Reptile, and Ermac) during combat, portrayed by John Turk (who also portrayed unmasked Sub-Zero and Shang Tsung). This character is playable by performing a special button combination. The Nintendo 64 version replaced him with a female character named Khameleon, who switches between the female ninjas instead (Kitana, Mileena, and Jade), portrayed by Becky Gable.

== Development ==
When we going [sic] to release Ultimate MK3 on consoles, it seemed odd to release it on the Playstation without doing something "special" for it. Since the PS1 had so much space (CD drive) we decided to include the MK1 and MK2 assets and call it MK Trilogy. Actually we were busy working on the arcade games and our San Diego team was doing the ports and MK Trilogy. It sold HUGE !!

— Ed Boon

Actors Ho Sung Pak (Liu Kang), Philip Ahn (Shang Tsung), Elizabeth Malecki (Sonya Blade), Katalin Zamiar (Kitana/Mileena/Jade) and Daniel Pesina (Johnny Cage and Scorpion/Sub-Zero/Reptile/Smoke) all left Midway prior to the production of the game due to royalty disputes, and so their respective roles were played by new actors. Initially publisher Williams Entertainment stated that Johnny Cage would not be included in the game at all due to the dispute with Pesina. Carlos Pesina's original sprites were used for Raiden's gameplay, but Sal Divita's image was used for his versus screen picture.

Most of the background music tracks from MKII and MK3 remained intact, especially for the CD-ROM versions of the game. In all versions of the game, many of the tracks do not match their respective arenas when compared to their original arcade counterparts. In all versions of MKT, none of the music from the original Mortal Kombat game is used. All of the CD-ROM games read the background music directly from the CD, providing high-quality CD sound, but all of the music loops are used when "Finish Him/Her" appears. All of the music taken from MK3 on the CD-ROM MKT games is noticeably slowed down in both speed and pitch. When these particular songs were converted to MKT' Red Book CD-DA quality, they were downsampled without resampling them to maintain the original tempo and pitch in the PC, PlayStation, and Saturn versions.

== Release ==
=== PlayStation ===
This version was developed by Avalanche Software. There are at least three public revisions of this game for the PlayStation; the final version is the North American Greatest Hits and European Platinum edition. With each revision, aspects of the gameplay were refined, producing gameplay closer to that of Ultimate Mortal Kombat 3 for the arcade. Many of the infinite combos and bugs found in the game only existed in earlier revisions. Shang Tsung never appears anywhere within the "Choose Your Destiny" towers, probably because of the loading delays when morphing in the PlayStation version (there are options to completely turn off morphs or let the system load two additional characters into memory when playing as Shang Tsung, thus eliminating the long loading delays when morphing). The only time the CPU ever controls Tsung is during the attract mode.

After beating the PlayStation version of the game, the final message in the credits says "MK4 coming in 1997". This version of the game exhibits a number of bugs when played on a PlayStation 2 or PlayStation 3 console which causes the game to freeze at certain points.

=== Nintendo 64 ===
The Nintendo 64 port is based on the Windows PC and PlayStation versions of Mortal Kombat 3 and the Sega Saturn version of Ultimate Mortal Kombat 3, and was developed by Williams Entertainment's San Diego development division, Leland Interactive Media. This edition includes 3-on-3 simultaneous battles as an exclusive feature. In this version, like in the arcade, the player begins the game with four credits, but after playing a two-player match, the player earns an extra credit, while in the CD-ROM versions anyone can play for free. Free Play must be unlocked on the N64 version, which also has a more cohesive "Supreme Demonstration" feature (which shows every Fatality, Babality, Friendship, Animality, and Brutality for every character) than the PS or Saturn versions (as the latter versions needed to load the Fatalities and thus cannot show every one in the allotted time). This version only uses music from MK3 and is of considerably lower quality than the CD versions. However, all ending tunes and music loops used during the "Finish Him/Her" sequences are intact, unlike in the CD-ROM versions. For some MK3/UMK3 backgrounds, the incorrect background track is used compared to one used for arcade UMK3.

Due to cartridge limitations, only 30 characters are included, instead of the 37 featured in the other console versions. The N64 port lacks Goro and Kintaro; the classic versions of Jax, Kung Lao, Kano, and Raiden; as well as the unmasked Sub-Zero (however, the masked Sub-Zero can perform both Sub-Zeros' special moves). Chameleon is replaced with the secret character Khameleon, a grey female ninja that randomly switches between Kitana, Mileena and Jade. The N64 version of the game, like MK3 and UMK3, provides the player with an "Ultimate Kombat Kode" screen after a single-player game is over, where a 6-digit code can be entered to unlock Human Smoke and Khameleon for normal play.

Like the Saturn version, the font of the lifebars for the male and female ninjas is of a different font (Revue) versus the other characters (italicized Arial). Further, the "new" characters: Noob Saibot, Rain, Baraka, Rayden, Johnny Cage, and Khameleon use italicized Arial, but with greater spacing than the original MK3 characters. Also, the announcer does not speak the character's name once Shang Tsung morphs into them, unlike arcade UMK3, with their name appearing in the lifebar instead of Shang Tsung while morphed.

The N64 game also includes a new stage, the Star Bridge, made of the Pit II's background with a star-filled sky. Some older backgrounds are also enhanced with extra graphics and added animation. For example, the Pit I features two different sky backgrounds (a pitch-black, star-filled sky in the N64 version, and the same sky background as the Pit II in the CD-ROM versions); Kahn's Kave has animated clouds and a glowing floor added to it; and the Lost Bridge has Hornbuckle and Blaze appear at random in the background. In the N64 version, the Graveyard stage has more names on the gravestones near the front: besides those of the original Midway design team for MK3, names of the team at Williams Entertainment were added, and the date of death on the stones was changed to the creators' birthdates.

In development for the N64 game, both The Bank and Kahn's Arena backgrounds were included, seeming to be building on the UMK3 version made for the Saturn previously. In Kahn's Arena, both Raiden and Baraka (where Kano and Sonya in MK2, respectively) were held captive by Kahn if not actively participating in the fight. The captured animations are made of different frames of the respective character's winning pose. Kahn's Arena recycled The Bridge background music. Since this was only seen in beta versions and not in the final game, the reason for their capture is unknown as well as any impact on the story. Additionally, at the conclusion of the battle, Kahn rises from his seat, something rumored to have been considered for inclusion in MK2 (either after defeating Kintaro or at the end of the match) but ultimately was not.

In this version, there are two secret menus, because not all the playable characters are unlocked from the start. Motaro and Shao Kahn can each perform a Fatality exclusive to this port. They also have an aggressor meter, unlike in other versions. In the Subway's stage fatality, new animations were added for the characters. Nightwolf has a very different Friendship move exclusive to this version, which he pulls out 3 hatchets and begins to juggle, as opposed to turning into Raiden since this character became playable in this game (although in the other versions, Nightwolf retains his original MK3 Friendship move). In addition, many frames of animation were cut from each character. Specific examples of this include Sheeva's win stance (it is essentially reduced to her bowing), Jax's win stance is shortened to just flexing instead of bumping his fists together first, Smoke and Sektor simply assume their winning stance instead of crossing their arm on their chest, among others.

=== Sega Saturn ===
The Sega Saturn version, converted by Point of View and released almost a year after the PlayStation and Nintendo 64 versions, is a straight conversion of the PlayStation version without any substantial changes in content. Due to hardware differences, the porting process from the PlayStation had some technical changes, which included the replacement of almost all transparency effects with mesh patterns and the loss of certain voice samples, like most fighters' running yells and some alternative phrases used by characters like Raiden and Scorpion in their attacks.

=== MS-DOS and Windows ===
The MS-DOS and Microsoft Windows versions are direct ports from the PlayStation by Point of View and released almost at the same time as the Saturn port. These versions have faster load times than the PlayStation. There are at least two public revisions of the game, the latest of them characterized by the word "final" next to the version number in the about dialog box, and featuring gameplay identical to the Greatest Hits release on PlayStation.

The game was re-released digitally on GOG.com on 15 August 2022.

=== Game.com ===
A version of the game was released as a launch title for the Game.com handheld console. The game includes a multiplayer mode, accessible only with the compete.com game link cable (to link two Game.com consoles together). Only 13 characters (Cyrax, Ermac, Jade, Mileena, Sektor, Kitana, Motaro, Nightwolf, Noob Saibot, Raiden, Rain, Reptile and Shao Kahn) and 10 Kombat Zones are present in this version, though early screenshots showed a different assortment of characters. In addition, each character only has two special moves and four finishing moves: one Fatality, Babality, Friendship, and Brutality, each of which has the same command for every character.

== Reception ==
Reception

Aggregate score
Aggregator	Score		
Aggregator	N64	PS	Saturn
GameRankings	52%	67%	

Review scores
Publication	Score		
Publication	N64	PS	Saturn
Electronic Gaming Monthly	8.125/10		
Game Informer			8.75/10
GameSpot	5.8/10	8.6/10	6.0/10
IGN	4.1/10	6.0/10	
N64 Magazine	34%		
Player One	70		
Super Game Power	4.8/5		5/5
Super Power	91%		
CD Consoles		2/5	
Sega Saturn Magazine			88%

The game's critical reception has varied considerably, depending on the platform and publication. Brazilian magazine SuperGamePower gave the Nintendo 64 version 4.8 out of 5, and regarded it as the best Mortal Kombat game. French magazine Super Power gave the N64 game 91%, favoring it over the PlayStation version. The four reviewers of Electronic Gaming Monthly all gave the Nintendo 64 version their recommendation, citing the impressive amount of content and absence of load times, though Dan Hsu and Crispin Boyer found the graphics disappointing given the capabilities of the console. Both Boyer and Shawn Smith said the game had converted them to the Mortal Kombat fandom. GamePro likewise praised the amount of content, as well as the accurate recreation of the arcade games' graphics, the addition of the Aggressor meter, and the application of new mechanics to characters from older games in the series. They complained that the game suffers from some slowdown and muted music, but concluded it "delivers with all the fighters, secrets, and carnage that made the series the phenomenon it is today."

Jeff Gerstmann of GameSpot contradicted GamePro, saying that the music is normal for a non-CD game and it is the sound effects (which GamePro described as "arcade-perfect") that sound muffled. And while he complimented the Nintendo 64 version's large selection of play modes, he said it is conspicuously missing frames of animation from the arcade games, and that the characters left out of this version are "favorites". Peer Schneider of IGN contended that all of the audio aspects sound muffled. He said the Nintendo 64 version is a faithful conversion of the arcade games, though he compared it unfavorably to the PlayStation version. However, he held that the arcade games themselves are too aged to merit an appearance on the Nintendo 64, referring to them as five years old (in actuality, Mortal Kombat 3 was barely a year old at the time, and even the oldest in the series was four years old). Mortal Kombat Trilogy was said to be a "particularly horrible game" among the Nintendo 64 library by Forbes, but was honored in Nintendo Power Awards '96, coming second in the category "Best Tournament Fighting Game".

Reviewing the PlayStation version, GamePro criticized the overly difficult opponent AI and the unbalanced nature of the playable boss characters, and said the music tracks "sound like a 45 record played at 33 RPM." They nonetheless concluded it to be "a must for any fighting gamer's library", due to the responsive controls and large amount of content. Though Electronic Gaming Monthly never reviewed the PlayStation version of Mortal Kombat Trilogy, they ran a four-page feature comparing it to the Nintendo 64 version. Shawn Smith picked the Nintendo 64 version as the one to buy, saying that the major bugs in the PlayStation version outweigh the Nintendo 64 version's various shortcomings. The other three members of the review team all voted for the PlayStation version, particularly citing the additional characters and the lower price ($49.99 as compared to $69.99 for the Nintendo 64 version). They later named both versions runner-up for Fighting Game of the Year, behind Tekken 2.

The Saturn version arrived nearly a year (over a year in some countries) after the PlayStation and Nintendo 64 versions and received comparatively little attention. Sega Saturn Magazine said the long wait for the conversion was baffling (since the game's 2D visuals fall within the Saturn's specialty and no new content had been created for the Saturn version) and damaging (since superior 2D Saturn fighters had since come out and home versions of Mortal Kombat 4 were on the horizon, making Mortal Kombat Trilogy both graphically and stylistically outdated). Sega Saturn Magazine, Game Informer, and GamePro all concluded it to be a must-have for Mortal Kombat fans due to its comprehensive content and features, but advised non-fans to look to other fighting games on the Saturn, and described it as virtually identical to the PlayStation version. GamePro printed a warning to "think twice before purchasing this version of MK Trilogy" in a reader response section after they learned that Midway had deliberately omitted the animations for some fatalities in order to ship the game on time.

Released at a time when the Nintendo 64's popularity was burgeoning and there were few competing games for the system, the Nintendo 64 version of Mortal Kombat Trilogy saw impressive sales figures. According to a later IGN retrospective, Mortal Kombat Trilogy "offered something no fan could ignore: It brought every character from the series into the fold, along with most of the levels, making for one massive game that had enough to please everyone. Sure, some of the balance went out the window with the massive cast, but it was a small price to pay to make the Mortal Kombat family whole again, and it gave fans the closure they needed for Midway to move on to Mortal Kombat 4."
