= Dan Hsu =

Video game journalist (born 1971)

Dan "Shoe" Hsu (born 1971) is the former editorial director of the 1UP Network, as well as former editor-in-chief of the video game magazine Electronic Gaming Monthly, a position he held from 2001 to 2008. Hsu attended the University of Michigan. His nickname, "Shoe", refers to the pronunciation of his surname.

Hsu first joined EGM's magazine staff in 1996. Including a year-long absence in 2000 to work at website Gamers.com, Hsu spent 12 years working for EGM before announcing his April 25, 2008 departure from the 1UP Network. Immediately after leaving 1UP, Hsu started a personal blog with former EGM Senior Editor Crispin Boyer called Sore Thumbs Blog. This blog is no longer active.

Hsu co-founded Bitmob (and parent company Bitmob Media, Inc.) with Demian Linn, the former executive producer of GameVideos.com and The 1UP Show. Bitmob.com soft-launched in May 2009.

On December 1, 2009 it was announced via press release that Hsu would be returning to Electronic Gaming Monthly as part of its relaunch, along with Demian Linn.

VentureBeat acquired Bitmob on February 1, 2012. Since then, Bitmob has been incorporated into VentureBeat's gaming site, GamesBeat, where Hsu served as the editor-in-chief until October 2014, where he announced he was leaving gaming media permanently. He's still in the gaming business, currently working at Blizzard Entertainment as Senior Director of Content Programming.

== Controversies ==
Hsu created a stir in the gaming industry in late 2005, when he wrote an editorial about the practice of gaming magazines and websites selling article and editorial opportunities to gaming publishers in exchange for advertising agreements. Citing an unnamed contact at a major game publishing company, Hsu refused to name the parties involved, but condemned those responsible for not maintaining journalistic integrity. The matter was publicized further when Slashdot linked to a Games.net editorial response written by Chris Cook, a writer for game magazine GamePro, who admonished Hsu for not specifying which companies were involved in the practices that were alluded to.

Following the launch of the Microsoft Xbox 360 in November 2005, Hsu interviewed Peter Moore, then the head of marketing for the Home and Entertainment division of Microsoft. At the time of the interview, there was much negative publicity in the media regarding technical problems with the system, as well as some complaints of the limited software line-up at launch within the gaming community. Much of the interview focused on these issues, as well as other various complaints by some gamers over limited backward compatibility with original Xbox games on the 360 and a possible lack of improvement in graphics and game play over previous console generations. Hsu's questioning were viewed as inappropriately rude, confrontational, or aggressive by some readers. This reaction caused Hsu to defend the interview in his blog twice; the first time saying that there had been much positive response to the interview as well, and a second time featuring an e-mail of support from Moore following the backlash. Third-party observer Penny Arcade noted in a satirical webcomic strip that the interview was a necessary departure from the easy-going tendency of most gaming journalists.
