= Ed Boon =

American video game producer

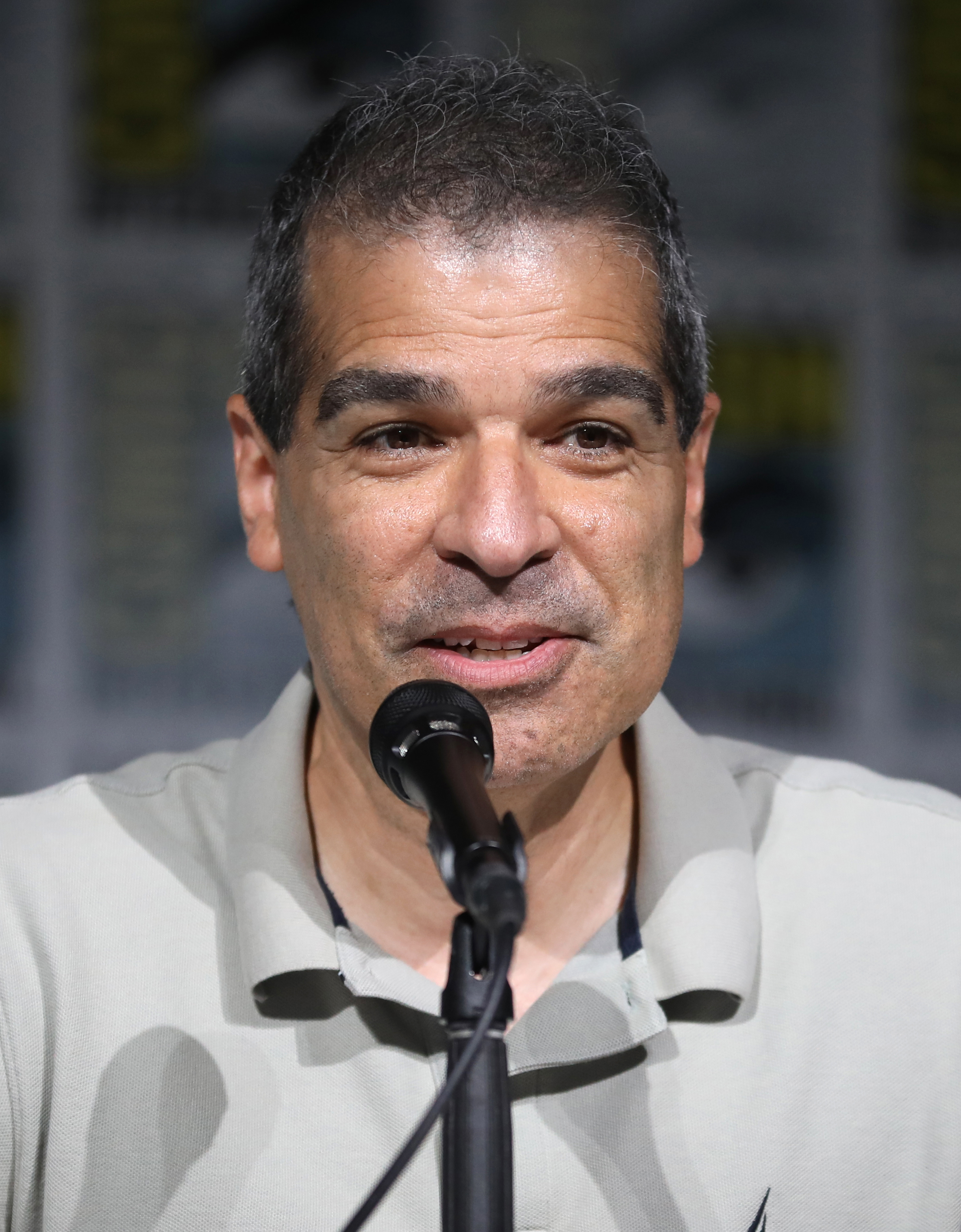
- Boon in 2023
- Born: Edward Boon; February 22, 1964 (age 62); Chicago, Illinois, U.S.
- Occupations: Game programmer, creative director, philanthropist, voice actor and producer
- Years active: 1987–present

Edward Boon (born February 22, 1964) is an American video game programmer, voice actor, and director. Boon is best known for co-creating the fighting game series Mortal Kombat along with John Tobias, and directing the Injustice series. In 2009, he was chosen by IGN as one of the top 100 game creators of all time for his involvement in the Mortal Kombat series.

Boon was employed for over 15 years at Midway Games. Since 2011, he has worked for NetherRealm Studios.

== Life and career ==
Boon graduated from high school at Loyola Academy in Wilmette. Boon is of Hispanic descent, and his mother came from the Dominican Republic while his father is Dutch-American. He earned a Bachelor of Science degree in mathematics and computer science from the University of Illinois at Urbana-Champaign.

After graduation, he was employed by Williams Entertainment in their pinball department, working on approximately 20 pinball games over the next two years. During this time, he was called the Mortal Master, an early indicator towards a future creation.

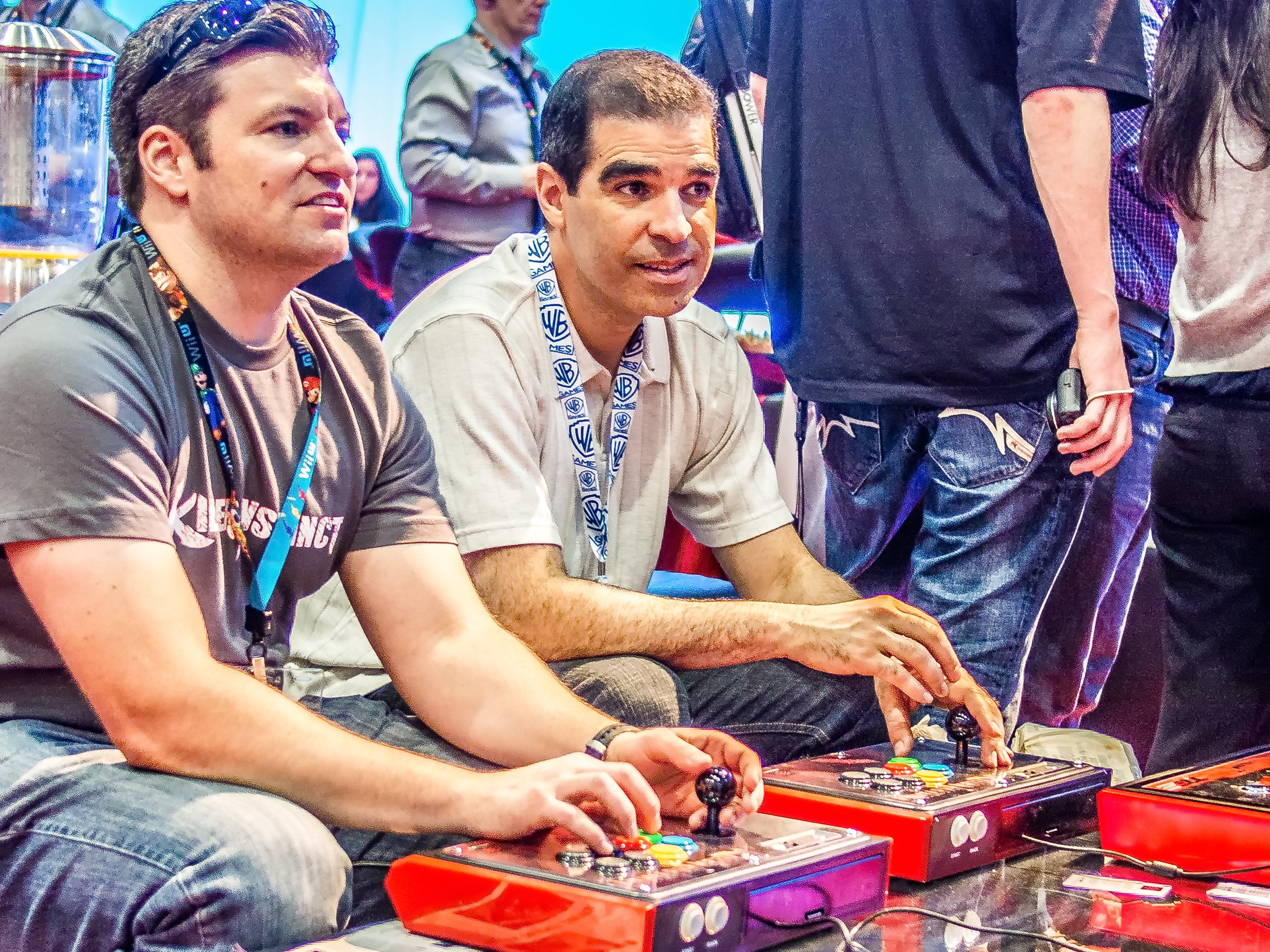
Ed Boon at E3 2013

He is the co-creator of the Mortal Kombat fighting game series, along with John Tobias, and served as the series' lead programmer, with Tobias as the lead designer, until their partnership dissolved with Tobias' departure from Midway in 2000. Boon named series characters Sonya and Tanya after his sisters Sonia and Tania, while another character, Noob Saibot, was named after Boon and Tobias' reversed surnames. Programmer Mike Boon is Ed's younger brother and has been a part of his team since Mortal Kombat 4.

Boon continues to be directly involved with the Mortal Kombat franchise and its multimedia side projects and has also provided voice acting and motion capture work for the games, most notably providing the voice for the "Come here!" and "Get over here!" catchphrases by Scorpion in several games of the series as well as the first two feature films Mortal Kombat and Mortal Kombat Annihilation. The 2008 edition of Guinness World Records Gamer's Edition consequently awarded him a world record for the "longest-serving video game voice actor."

He was inducted into the Academy of Interactive Arts & Sciences Hall of Fame in 2022.

== Works ==
=== Video games ===
Year	Title	Role(s)
1990	High Impact Football	—N/a
1991	Super High Impact	—N/a
1992	Total Carnage	Voice of General Akhboob
1992	Mortal Kombat	Designer, programmer, voice of Scorpion, Reptile, Shang Tsung (announcer)
1993	Mortal Kombat II	Designer, programmer, voice of Scorpion, Smoke, Noob Saibot, Liu Kang, and Jax
1995	Mortal Kombat 3	Designer, programmer, voice of Smoke, Liu Kang and Jax
1995	Ultimate Mortal Kombat 3	Executive producer, designer, programmer, voice of Scorpion
1996	Mortal Kombat Trilogy	Designer, programmer
1997	Mortal Kombat 4	Designer, programmer, voice of Johnny Cage, Raiden, Kai, Scorpion and Jax
1999	Mortal Kombat Gold	Project lead, voice of Cyrax
2001	The Grid	—N/a
2002	Mortal Kombat: Deadly Alliance	Team lead, game design, programming, voice of Scorpion
2004	Mortal Kombat: Deception	Project lead, game design, programming, voice of Scorpion, Reiko, Sub-Zero and Noob Saibot
2005	Mortal Kombat: Shaolin Monks	Executive producer, voice of Scorpion
2006	Mortal Kombat: Armageddon	Creative director
2008	Mortal Kombat vs. DC Universe	Creative director, team leader
2011	Mortal Kombat	Team leader, creative director, additional voices
2011	Batman: Arkham City Lockdown	Creative director
2013	Injustice: Gods Among Us	Creative director, team leader
2013	Batman: Arkham Origins	Creative director, team leader
2015	Mortal Kombat X	Creative director, team leader
2017	Injustice 2	Creative director, team leader
2019	Mortal Kombat 11	Creative director, team leader
2023	Mortal Kombat 1	Creative director, team leader

=== Pinball ===
Year	Title	Role(s)
1987	F-14 Tomcat	effects
1987	Space Station	software and effects
1988	Banzai Run	effects
1988	Taxi	software and effects
1989	Black Knight 2000	software and effects
1990	FunHouse	voice of Rudy

=== Film & Television ===
Year	Title	Role(s)	Note(s)
1995	Mortal Kombat	Scorpion (voice)	
1997	Mortal Kombat Annihilation	Scorpion (voice)	
2006	Drawn Together	Scorpion (voice)	Episode: "The One Wherein There Is a Big Twist: Part 2"
2008	Code Monkeys	Himself (voice)	Episode: "The Great Recession"
2011	Mortal Kombat: Legacy	Ed Goodman	cameo appearance in first-season episode "Johnny Cage"
2026	Mortal Kombat II	Ed, Scorpion (voice)	cameo
