= Liu Kang =

Mortal Kombat character

- Mortal Kombat character
- Liu Kang in Mortal Kombat: Shaolin Monks
- First appearance: Mortal Kombat (1992)
- Created by: Ed Boon; John Tobias
- Designed by: Various: John Tobias (early games); Luis Mangubat (MK:D/MK:A); Mark Lappin (MK:SM); Atomhawk Design (MK9); Marco Nelor (MKX)
- Voiced by: List: Ed Boon (MKII); John Tobias (MK4); Jin Kim (MK:SM); Tom Choi (2008–2015); Matthew Yang King (2019–present); Randy Hamilton (1995 animated film); Brian Tochi (animated series); Jordan Rodrigues (2020s animated films)
- Portrayed by: List: Robin Shou (1990s films); Brian Tee (web series); Ludi Lin (2021 film)
- Motion capture: List: Ho-Sung Pak (MK, MKII); Eddie Wong (MK3, UMK3, MKT); Josh Tsui (MK4); Carlos Pesina (MK:D/MK:A); Lawrence Kern (MKvsDCU, MK9); Nick Toussaint (MK11); Noah Fleder (MK1)

Liu Kang (Chinese: 劉康) is a fictional character and the main protagonist of the Mortal Kombat fighting game franchise by Midway Games and NetherRealm Studios. Depicted as Earthrealm's greatest warrior and champion, he debuted in the original 1992 game as a Shaolin monk with special moves, which were intended to be the easiest for players to perform. Since his introduction, Liu Kang has appeared as playable in every main installment except Mortal Kombat: Deadly Alliance (2002). He is also the protagonist of the action-adventure spin-off Mortal Kombat: Shaolin Monks (2005).

The character's storyline sees him win the eponymous Mortal Kombat tournament in the first and second games, saving Earthrealm from being conquered by the opposing forces of Outworld. During both the original and rebooted timelines, Liu Kang receives a more villainous depiction by Raiden appearing as a reanimated corpse in the former and an undead revenant who rules Netherrealm in the latter. He returns to his heroic role in Mortal Kombat 11 (2019), in which he becomes the god of fire.

Liu Kang has appeared in various media outside of the games, including as the hero of the 1995 film adaptation and its 1997 sequel Mortal Kombat Annihilation. Reception of the character has been mainly favorable for his special moves and gameplay, although criticism has been directed towards his Bruce Lee-inspired yells. His characterization in the reboot games received negative response for his death at Raiden's hands but his resurrection in Mortal Kombat 11 earned better response for becoming a more heroic figure.

== Creation ==
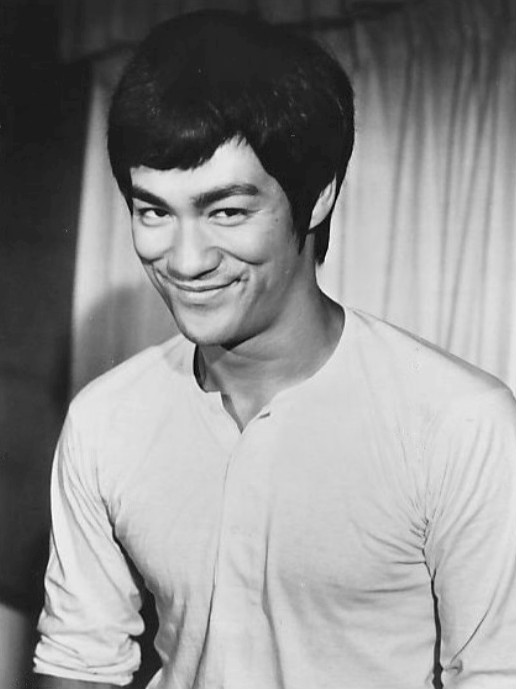
Bruce Lee (left) and Minamoto Yoshitsune (right) were the two main influences of Liu Kang's character.

Original concept sketches for a proposed Midway Games fighting title by artist and lead game designer John Tobias featured a Japanese character named Minamoto Yoshitsune. However, according to Tobias, during production of what would become Mortal Kombat, the Midway staff "just couldn't deal with the name". The character was renamed Liu Kang as a nod to actor Gordon Liu, who starred in the 1978 film The 36th Chamber of Shaolin. In a 1995 interview, lead series programmer Ed Boon, discussing the development team's immediate decision to include Liu Kang in Mortal Kombat 3, said: "It'd be like doing part three of Star Wars and not having Luke Skywalker in there. You don't do that."

Liu Kang and fellow fighter Kung Lao, according to Tobias, were meant to complement each other: one as the present-day chosen one and the other as a reflection of a failed past, with their sense of righteous purpose bonding their friendship. The producers of the 1995 Mortal Kombat film chose to combine Liu and Kung Lao's characters, making Liu the descendant of The Great Kung Lao, which, according to Tobias, "caus[ed] confusion in our games for years to follow". Any mention of Liu Kang as descendent of The Great Kung Lao in the games "was a mistake".

In May 2023, Boon stated he had decided to put Liu Kang on the cover of Mortal Kombat 1 to signify a new story arc, in turn diverting from Scorpion and Sub-Zero, who were regularly chosen for the games' covers. Tobias has said that although "there have been deviations in different media to serve their purposes, ... the truth of Liu's hero's journey and the root of the character's inspiration usually seemed to find their way."

After the developers had received feedback that unlocking him in Deception had proved difficult, Liu Kang became a regular playable character in the PlayStation Portable port Unchained. Like the other characters chosen for the 2008 crossover game Mortal Kombat vs. DC Universe, Liu Kang was added to the game's roster because of his popularity.

Actor Tom Choi voiced Liu Kang from MK vs. DC Universe to Mortal Kombat X, and explained in 2021 that Boon wanted the character to rapidly speak nonsensical lines for his special moves in MK 2011. Choi stated that while he enjoyed playing an "iconic" and "archetypal" character and Liu Kang was notable for being a non-stereotypical Asian lead, he noticed the creative teams change leading decisions involving changes in the story such as Liu taking a lesser role in several games. Matthew Yang King, who replaced Choi in MK11, compared Liu Kang and Kung Lao to brothers with a competitive friendship, and opted to voice Liu Kang in MK11 as an "ode" to Bruce Lee, which he opined that Caucasian actors who voiced the character in the past had intentionally avoided.

=== Designs ===
Liu Kang's ethnicity was made changed to Chinese and he "was originally going to be a traditional monk – bald and in robes". Liu Kang was played by Korean actor and martial artist Ho-Sung Pak in the first two games, but Pak's refusal to shave his head resulted in the character instead being modeled after Bruce Lee and depicted as "a renegade monk [who] grew his hair back". Tobias additionally drew inspiration from the 1973 film Enter the Dragon in developing Liu Kang's backstory.

Liu Kang's design in the first game had him shirtless with short hair, while wearing only black pants and white shoes. Starting with Mortal Kombat II, his outfit incorporated a red palette by way of single vertical stripes on his pants and a matching headband, in addition to black shoes and studded wrist guards; the MKII introduction cutscene shows a background fight of him in his original attire defeating old Shang Tsung while in the foreground he is shown in his updated costume. Mortal Kombat 3 contained minor changes to the character's depiction, with longer hair and thin black leg strips wrapped above his ankles in order to give him a "sleeker" look.

This design was carried over into Mortal Kombat: Deception and Mortal Kombat: Armageddon, but due to his resurrection as a zombie, his skin was ash gray and he wore hooked chains around his wrists; his alternate costume featured him as a living person. The character's death in the previous game, Mortal Kombat: Deadly Alliance, inspired the composition of a "funeral song" by series music composer Dan Forden, titled "Liu Kang's Tomb", and was included in Deception in the arena containing his tomb. For Mortal Kombat vs. DC Universe, He retained his Mortal Kombat 3 design that was accentuated with a championship belt adorned with the Mortal Kombat dragon emblem.

=== Gameplay ===
A screenshot of Liu Kang's recurring Chinese dragon Fatality from Mortal Kombat II, as seen in the canceled HD remake version for Mortal Kombat: Arcade Kollection

Liu Kang was designed as a character that both casual and experienced gamers could play with little difficulty. He specializes in kicks, with his most common being a straight flying kick that launches him across the screen to hit his opponent's torso. Mortal Kombat II introduced another of his signature special moves, the "Bicycle Kick", which propels him across the screen with a flurry of kicks that resemble the pedaling of a bicycle and again target the opponent's midsection. His projectile attack sends a fireball, in the shape of a Chinese dragon shooting from his hands toward his opponent. This move was adapted in future games to allow use of it while crouching or jumping.

His first Fatality (a finishing move that executes defeated opponents), titled "Shaolin Uppercut", has him perform a butterfly kick (often mistaken for a cartwheel) on his opponent before connecting with an uppercut that knocks them offscreen, and then landing. According to Tobias, the background not darkening during the finisher was a glitch that was kept in and rationalized as symbolizing Liu Kang's noble motivations. The "Shaolin Uppercut" appeared only once more in Mortal Kombat II, as Liu Kang was given more graphic Fatalities thereafter because he was depicted by Midway as having "strong Shaolin beliefs, but was no longer a part of the Shaolin monks". In contrast to the "Shaolin Uppercut", the "Dragon" Fatality was designed to instantly kill the opponent in order to convey the character's sense of revenge against his nemesis Shang Tsung, who had killed his fellow Shaolin monks in the storyline of Mortal Kombat II, and has become his signature finisher. Series co-designer John Vogel called it his favorite Fatality because of how it changed Liu Kang's appearance. His second Fatality in Mortal Kombat 3 has him vanishing and then dropping a Mortal Kombat arcade machine onto his opponent, crushing them.

== Appearances ==
=== Mortal Kombat games ===
==== In Midway Games ====
Liu Kang is introduced in the original Mortal Kombat game as a Chinese Shaolin kung fu monk, representing his fellow Shaolin to defeat tournament host, nefarious sorcerer Shang Tsung. In the sequel Mortal Kombat II (1993), Liu Kang seeks revenge against Shao Kahn, emperor of the otherworldly realm of Outworld and Shang Tsung's master who had his comrades killed. Although Liu Kang is victorious, he is forced to face the Emperor again as he invades Earthrealm through in Mortal Kombat 3 (1995). In Mortal Kombat 4 (1997), Liu Kang fights against the disgraced Elder God Shinnok's forces to save Princess Kitana, with whom he is in love. Following Shinnnok's defeat Kitana then invites Liu Kang to Edenia, but he is unable to commit to a relationship due to his duty as Earthrealm's champion.

Liu Kang becomes unplayable for the first and only time in the Mortal Kombat series in Mortal Kombat: Deadly Alliance (2002), when the titular partnership of Shang Tsung and fellow sorcerer Quan Chi take his life. In Mortal Kombat: Deception (2004), Raiden reanimates Liu Kang's corpse and sends it on a murderous rampage, leaving his spirit to attempt to regain control in with Ermac's help and help his undead allies. The renanimated Liu Kang form is playable but as a secret character unlocked by players only during a specific time and date in the game's training mode. Although Liu Kang has not fully regained control of his body in Mortal Kombat: Armageddon (2006), he is still playable.

Along with Kung Lao, Liu Kang is the lead character in the 2005 spin-off action-adventure game Mortal Kombat: Shaolin Monks, which serves as a retelling of the events leading up to Mortal Kombat II and features the two Shaolin monks traveling to Outworld to find and defeat Shang Tsung and Shao Kahn while rescuing Kitana and other allies along the way.

Liu Kang is among the eleven characters representing the Mortal Kombat franchise in the title Mortal Kombat vs. DC Universe (2008), which features fights between characters from the Mortal Kombat and DC Comics universes. In this game, Liu Kang appears as the protagonist of the first chapter of the Mortal Kombat story mode. Tobias said he wanted to see the fight between Liu Kang and Batman, as he noted their backstories are very similar because both had attempted to help their respective leaders regain their senses.

==== NetherRealm Studios titles ====
In the Mortal Kombat reboot (2011), which is a retelling of the first three games, Liu Kang reprises his role from the first three tournaments as one of Raiden's chosen warriors. Although Raiden's visions of his death and end of the realms make him believe Liu Kang has to kill Shao Kahn, he later realizes Kahn must win to be punished instead. Liu Kang loses his faith in Raiden's visions after his friends' deaths and is accidentally killed in combat by his mentor. Liu Kang returns in Mortal Kombat X as Quan Chi's undead revenant, serving Shinnok to enact revenge on Raiden and the Elder Gods. Following Quan Chi's death and Shinnok's defeat, he and Kitana become the new rulers of Netherrealm. In Mortal Kombat 11, Liu Kang appears as both as undead and as a younger Shaolin created by the antagonistic keeper of time, Kronika. Upon realizing they are meant to be enemies, Raiden fuses with both Liu Kangs, giving him divine powers and redemption. The new Fire God Liu Kang storms Kronika's keep and kills her in battle. In the DLC story expansion Aftermath, Liu Kang erases Shang Tsung who seeks to create his own era. The God decides to train the Shaolin.

In Mortal Kombat 1, Fire God Liu Kang forms a tenuous alliance with Outworld under the auspices of continuing the Mortal Kombat tournaments and attempts to prevent Shang Tsung and Quan Chi's rise to villainy. Upon hearing Shang Tsung is now an advisor to Outworld's Empress Sindel, he sends his allies to investigate. Shang Tsung's benefactor is revealed to be himself from an alternate timeline depicted in Aftermath where he became a Titan after defeating Kronika and Liu Kang, who intends to kill everyone in Liu Kang's timeline. Liu Kang's army manages to take down Shang Tsung's. However, reclaiming his Keeper of Time powers had cost Liu Kang his immortality.

=== Other media ===
==== Printed media ====
Liu Kang was the hero of the comic book adaptation of the Mortal Kombat series by Malibu Comics. In the first miniseries, Blood and Thunder, his backstory was mostly kept intact as a Shaolin monk attempting to restore the tournament to its rightful owners. The miniseries dirverged from the videogames in not making Liu Kang the chosen one to defeat Goro, which instead fell on twin monk brothers named Sing and Sang, two original characters created specifically for the comics. After they are killed by Goro in the third issue, Liu Kang becomes the Shaolin's only hope in defeating Shang Tsung. The following miniseries, Battlewave, has Liu Kang win the first tournament after defeating Goro. He then returns to his normal life as an architect in Chicago, having left the Order of Light before the events of the first series. However, he suffers constant attacks by an unknown force of ninjas and later receives help from Johnny Cage's bodyguard Bo when Goro ambushes him in an office building. Eventually, he decides to travel to Outworld, realizing that he cannot avoid Mortal Kombat.

==== Film and television ====
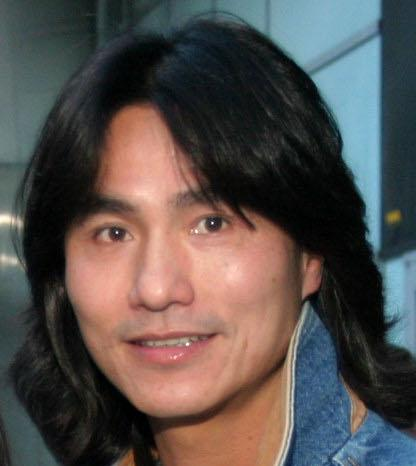
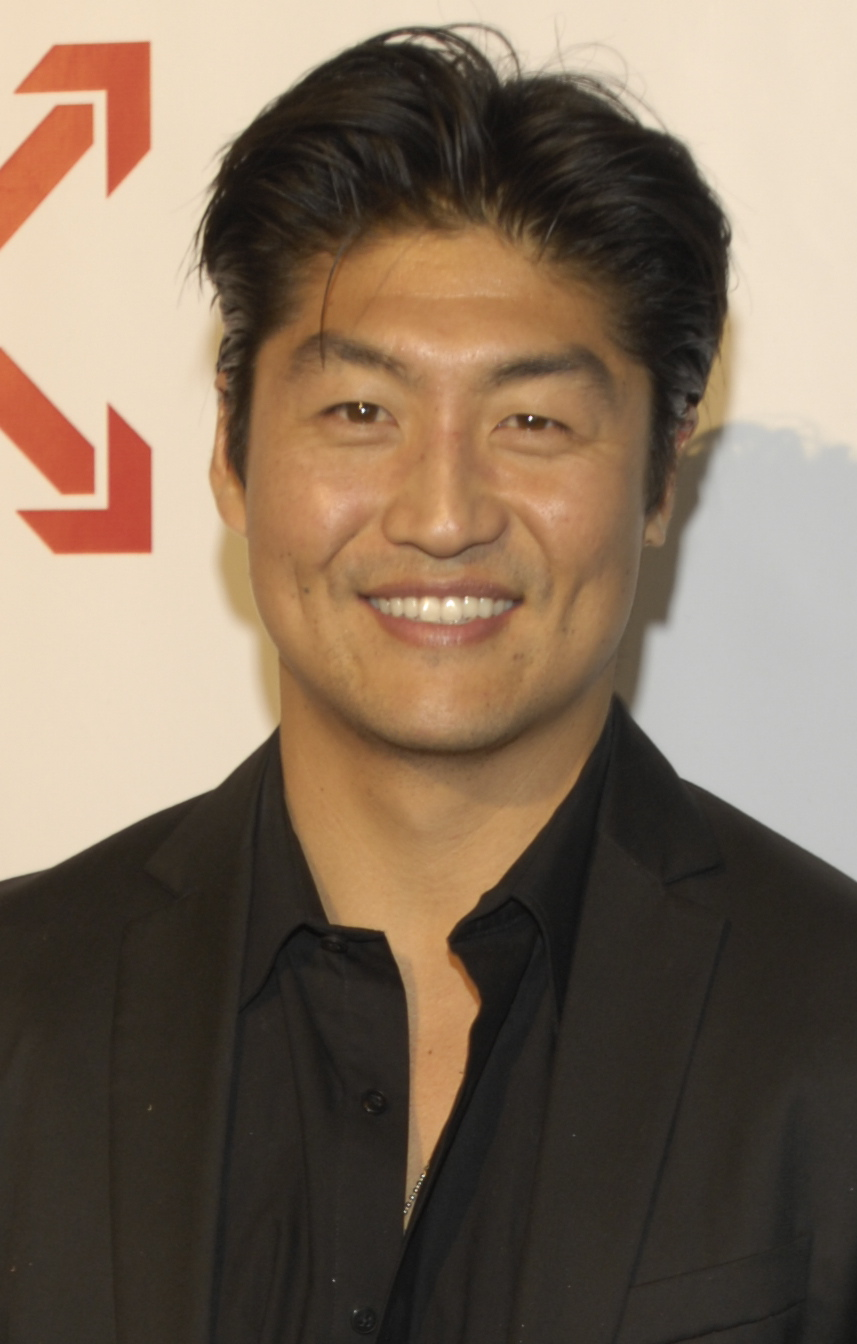
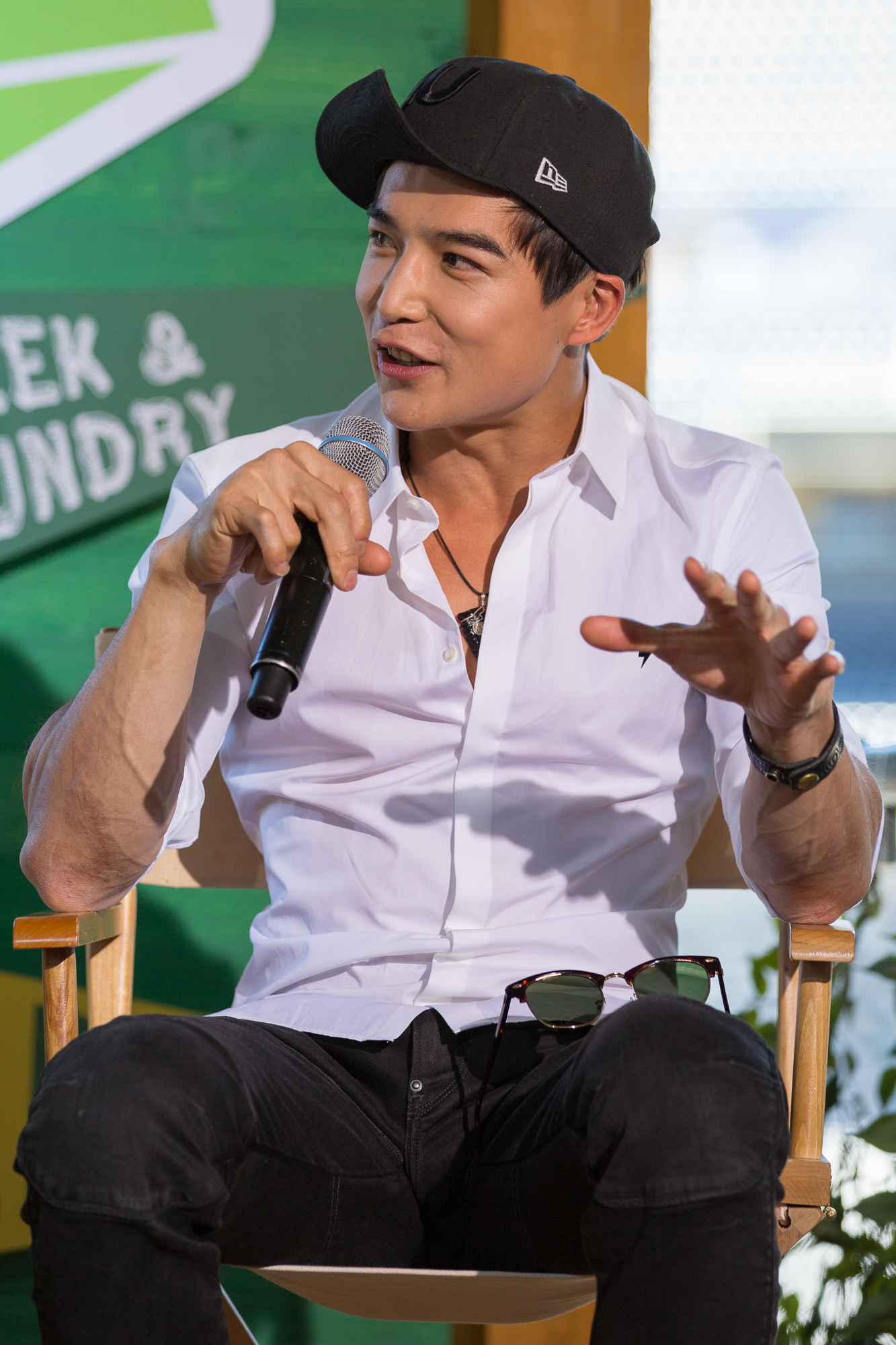
While Robin Shou portrayed Liu Kang as an Earthrealm hero in the live-action films, Brian Tee played him as an antagonist. Ludi Lin portrayed the character in the 2021 film.

Liu Kang is the main protagonist of the 1995 Mortal Kombat film, in which he is played by Robin Shou. Director Paul W. S. Anderson wanted Liu Kang's character to be "really engaging" and cast Shou, noting his skill in martial arts. Anderson compared Shou with Jackie Chan, noting that he started his career in Hong Kong working as a stuntman, including with Chan. In the film, Liu Kang takes part in the tournament out of guilt over his brother's death at the hands of Shang Tsung. Raiden recruits Liu Kang on the journey to Shang Tsung's island, where he helps him get over his brother's death and defeat the sorcerer. The relationship between Liu Kang and Kitana is portrayed as more metaphysical than romantic. Shou said that in the original script he "was supposed to fall in love with Talisa Soto [Kitana]. I was looking forward to it, but they thought we have so much action, we don't want to add romance to it. They cut it out." Randy Hamilton voiced Liu Kang in Mortal Kombat: The Journey Begins, a straight-to-video animated prequel released four months prior to the film.

Shou and Talisa Soto (Kitana) were the only two actors to reprise their roles from the first film in the 1997 sequel Mortal Kombat Annihilation. In the sequel, Liu Kang joins the Earthrealm warriors to stop Shao Kahn. Shou stated that he felt pressure while filming to trying to find a style between American and Hong Kong artist, such as Jet Li and Steven Seagal. According to Chris Conrad, who played Cage, "Robin and Talisa were very, very cool. It's a fun, well developed franchise. Robin and Talisa and the entire cast was just so pleasant and fun to be around." Thai actor and martial artist Tony Jaa was a stunt double for Shou.

Brian Tee played Liu Kang in the 2013 second season of director Kevin Tancharoen's web series Mortal Kombat: Legacy. Tee was initially not fond of the character; he said that he would have preferred to portray Sub-Zero and that there were more actors who were more suited to depict Liu Kang's Bruce Lee-like persona. He elaborated that Liu Kang "was this one note caricature of a martial artist/kung fu guy. I wanted someone with a lot more depth and a lot more feeling and character struggle." Upon reading the script, Tee was surprised by its take on the character as an anti-hero, especially his rivalry with Kung Lao. Tee did a majority of stunts with the help of stunt coordinator Garrett Warren, choreographer Larnell Stovall, and his stunt double, Kim Do.

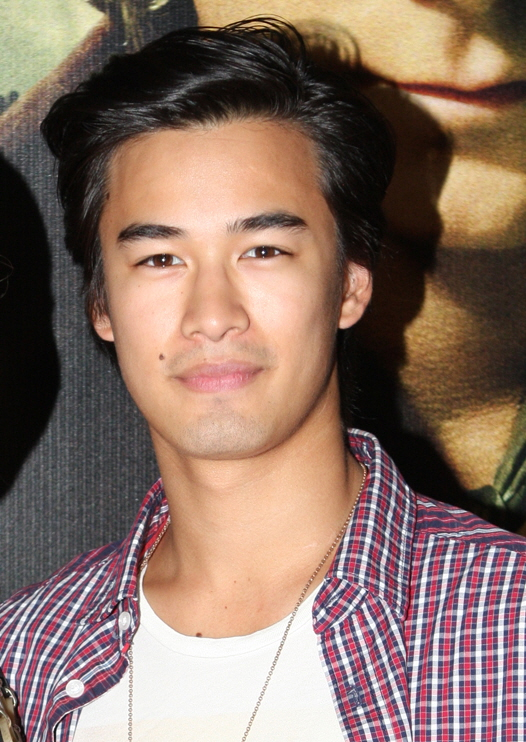
Jordan Rodrigues aimed voiced Liu Kang in the animated films.

Liu Kang was played by Ludi Lin in the 2021 reboot film Mortal Kombat. An orphaned street child now living as a warrior monk and protege of Raiden, Liu Kang guides Earthrealm's warriors towards discovering their abilities. After his friend and senior kung fu student (Chinese: 師兄; pinyin: shīxiōng) Kung Lao is murdered by Shang Tsung, he avenges him by killing Kabal. Ludi Lin regards Liu Kang as a lone wolf archetype of character but still "alpha male" who cares about his allies. While finding Liu Kang as a pacifist, he believes the character also finds the moment needed to execute violence and will always fight back. In preparing for his role, he studied most of Bruce Lee's works. During production, Ludi Lin was concerned that he would receive death threats if the character did not wear his signature red bandana; he eventually convinced the director to pick the red bandana from Kung Lao's hat and wear it in the film's climax. When Liu Kang incinerates Kabal in the climax, the team originally intended to include a game reference known as "toasty" where a character is incinerated by a fire attack but it was removed due to the team finding it "cringe". Lin reprises his role in the sequel.

Liu Kang is one of the lead characters in the 1996 animated series Mortal Kombat: Defenders of the Realm, and was voiced by Brian Tochi. He is not the sole protagonist, instead sharing that role with several other Earthrealm heroes. Jordan Rodrigues voiced the role of Liu Kang in the 2020 animated movie Mortal Kombat Legends: Scorpion's Revenge, in which Liu Kang, Cage, and Sonya Blade reprised their roles from the first Mortal Kombat game with Scorpion's aid. Rodrigues reprised his role in the sequel Mortal Kombat Legends: Battle of the Realms as the film's central protagonist. For this film, the cast and crew sought to convey the father-son relationship between Raiden and Liu Kang, as Liu Kang's parents are revealed to have been killed during the protagonist's early days. The depth Raiden is given helps Liu Kang to surpass his own doubts and become the champion. Rodrigues stated that Liu Kang's patience paid off and the trauma only added "fuel to the fire to Liu Kang's burning heart".

== Reception ==
The character has received mostly mixed positive response by gaming publications. Digital Spy compared him with Street Fighter character Ryu, stating that while both are "kind of dull", they develop appealing techniques across their respective series. GamesRadar+ referred to him as one of gaming's various "kickass Bruce Lee clones", citing his similarities with Bruce Lee and noting his shouts. The A.V. Club compared Liu Kang's relationship with Kitana to the titular characters in the movie Mr. & Mrs. Smith (2005), noting how the games often give them proper scenes despite the franchise being focused on violent battles. There was also commentary about Liu Kang's moves. GameDaily complained about the character's voice, saying that "Liu Kang screams out like a chicken"; IGN's Douglas Perry wrote that he preferred Liu Kang over Kung Lao as a playable character in Shaolin Monks because of his "intuitive fighting moves", adding that his shouts were "annoying" yet "strangely pleasing". GamesRadar+ wrote that "the strange squeals he emits during his trademark Bicycle Kick move are unforgettable".

Some critics have condemned the Mortal Kombat series racist, especially regarding its Asian characters. Guy Aoki, the president of the advocacy group Media Action Network for Asian Americans, rebuked Mortal Kombat II in 1994 for allegedly perpetuating existing stereotypes of Asians as martial arts experts including Liu Kang. Allyne Mills, publicist for the game's publisher Acclaim Entertainment, answered: "This is a fantasy game, with all different characters. This is a martial arts game which comes from Asia. The game was not created to foster stereotypes." The characters' racial diversity and the inclusion of female characters were also criticized by the psychologists Patricia Marks Greenfield and Rodney R. Cocking in their 1996 book Interacting with Video, writing they "cannot assume that this greater diversity represents a more progressive identity politics, for one could argue that it merely increases the racist and sexist potential of the individual fights." In Mortal Kombat: Games of Death, David Church wrote that Liu Kang and Shang Tsung were obvious references to Lee and Han from Enter the Dragon, noting Liu Kang's high-pitched vocalizations, Fatality moves, usage of Jeet Kune Do, and exaggerated kung fu style. Liu Kang's dragon Fatality has been described as one of the best Fatalities in the series, while the arcade throw has been criticized as a failed attempt at meta-humor. They have also praised his wormhole fatality in the 2023 Mortal Kombat 1, with some even calling it their favourite Fatality in the game, according to TheGamer, due to the notable gore performed on the enemy.

Fire God Liu Kang earned praise for his development in the narrative and actions in Mortal Kombat 11.

Upon his death in Deadly Alliance, IGN's Jeremy Dunham noted that Liu Kang was killed as part of the series' "'starting over' mentality". Complex remarked that the Mortal Kombat developers "finally found their groove again with Deadly Alliance, which began by snapping Liu Kang's neck". Game Informer described his death as a "shock". His redesign in Mortal Kombat: Deception earned mixed responses, with praise being given to his berserker combat style. GamesRadar used Liu Kang as an example of a stereotype of gaming heroes who reveal an evil alter ego that ruins the character's appealing traits, and considered him to be "a little like the Shaolin version of Goku, in that he's saved his world countless times and come back from the dead even more frequently". Meanwhile, Jesse Schedeen of IGN said, with regard to the DC universe crossover game, that "it just wouldn't be right having a game without [Liu Kang]". Den of Geek favorably reviewed Liu Kang's darker characterization starting with Deception and the reboot. Both Den of Geek and Hardcore Gamer also found Liu Kang's possible role in the series after the reboot to be shrouded in mystery, due to his possible revival as a villain as well as how he is not available to face Shinnok.

The character was highly praised for his role of being the protagonist in Mortal Kombat 11. GameRevolution enjoyed Liu Kang's ending in Mortal Kombat 11 and wondered which of his two endings – where he allies with either Raiden or Kitana – would be taken as canonical. PCGamesN praised the handling of his characterization and noting that players had looked forward to his best ending, which was difficult to achieve. Upon God Liu Kang's inclusion in the game as playable, GameRevolution compared it with Ryu's evil persona. Shacknews enjoyed the actions Liu Kang makes as a god due to the major direction the narrative takes in the DLC Aftermath as he aims to restart the generation. Den of Geek commented that Liu Kang's role as a protagonist in Mortal Kombat 11 was well handled as he fit the heroic role through his transformation into the God of Fire and Lightning. In a 2019 feature published on Polygon, MK11 writer Shawn Kittelsen stated that both Liu Kang and Raiden "fell from grace" in the 2000s, and that MK11 provided the last opportunity to redeem the two characters. Among new events in Mortal Kombat 1, Liu Kang was noted for his role reversal with Raiden as the Shaolin monk was now the new leader of the cast and proper relationships with characters from other worlds.

Robin Shou's take on Liu Kang in the 1995 film was also the subject of analysis in the book The Deathly Embrace: Orientalism and Asian American Identity, which discusses the character's attempt to face his fears and accept that he is not responsible for his brother's death, as well as the film's themes of individualism. Bloody Disgusting praised the fight choreography in Liu Kang's fight against Reptile, while Den of Geek praised Ludi Lin's acting in the 2021 film. The fight between Liu Kang and Kung Lao from the 2026 film has often been deemed as one of the best fights in the entire franchise for the combination of martial arts and special effects that emulate the original video games.
