= IDARB =

2015 video game

- Developer: Other Ocean Interactive
- Publisher: Other Ocean Interactive
- Director: Mike Mika
- Designer: Mike Mika
- Platforms: Windows; Xbox One
- Release: Xbox One January 30, 2015; Windows February 25, 2016
- Genres: Platformer; sports game

#IDARB (/ˈaɪdɑːrb/ EYE-darb; an abbreviation of "It Draws a Red Box") is a 2015 2D multiplayer sports video game developed and published by Other Ocean Interactive initially for Microsoft's Xbox One. In the game's main mode, up to eight players, a maximum of four on each team, attempt to run and jump across platforms to shoot a ball into the other team's goal. Extra points can be gained for scoring from a distance or bouncing the ball off platforms. Various visual and gameplay effects known as hashbombs could be triggered with Twitter posts or Twitch chat messages.

The game originated with a tweet made by lead developer Mike Mika in January 2014. Mika asked his followers where to take his new concept, a simple image of a red box standing among platforms. Ideas quickly flooded in, and Mika experimented with many of them, leading to the suggestions becoming unified under the hashtag #IDARB, which later became the game's title. A week after the initial tweet, fellow game designer Brandon Sheffield suggested Mika add a ball. Development progressed quickly afterwards, and the game was released exclusively by Microsoft for its Xbox One console under its ID@Xbox initiative in 2015.

The game was praised for its originality, its rapid gameplay, especially with many players, and the means through which it brought many Twitter users together to collectively develop a video game. However, the online multiplayer was criticized for its poor latency and matchmaking.

== Gameplay ==
A 2D multiplayer sports platformer party game, #IDARB features teams of up to four box-shaped players that attempt to shoot a ball into the opponent's goal over the course of four rounds, with each game lasting approximately ten minutes. In online multiplayer, a player could only play against as many other players as they had on the same console. For example, a team of two could only play against another team of two. A single-player campaign is also available, and its end credits ask players to tweet positive opinions about the game. During a match, a close-ranged shot is worth one point. Shots from further away are worth two, three, or five points, depending on their distance. Bonus points may also be earned for bouncing the ball off a platform; three bounces would grant the player a 3x-scoring multiplier. After a goal is scored, an announcer comments various comedic lines, referencing pieces of obscure pop culture, such as the 1985 film Fletch.

The map is the same during every match, with many platforms to jump on in the middle, pits to fall down at the bottom, and an arena in the center where the ball respawns after a team scores. A common theme of smaller matches is to lead the opponent down the wrong path of platforms, providing the player with an opportunity to run for the ball and quickly score. Possession of the ball may be dislodged through a "burst of energy", which sends the ball flying through the arena. This same burst of energy may also block the trajectory of the ball or another player. Having two or more players on each team presents the option to pass the ball to a teammate. Passing the ball uses the same button as shooting it. After two rounds, it is "halftime" and each team plays a minigame. These are spoofs of popular titles such as Flappy Bird and Duck Hunt. When a match ends, players will be prompted to spin their controller's right thumbstick. Whoever does this the fastest will be crowned MVP of the match.

The online multiplayer featured integration with Twitter. By tweeting a post that tagged the game's account, @idarbwire, along with the room code and an assigned hashtag, various effects known as hashbombs were triggered. For example, the hashtag #light would darken the entire screen except for the ball. These effects could also be achieved when streaming on Twitch through messages in the chat. The Twitch integration also let players gamble on the outcome of live matches, or AI-controlled ones, though the latter still allowed the use of hashbombs in the chat.

Aside from the main mode, there is a wide variety of side content. The game features a custom sprite creator, which lets players design their own playable characters; these may then be shared through QR codes. There are also many packs of pre-designed characters featuring crossovers such as Halo and The Walking Dead. Other features include a music creator and logo designer which lets groups of players develop their own logo and theme song that would be displayed upon entry to a match. "Over a dozen" real-world recipes were also contributed by developers in the video game industry for foods such as teriyaki chicken.

== Development ==
Development of #IDARB began on January 3, 2014, when game developer Mike Mika of Other Ocean Interactive suggested in a tweet that he wanted to develop a game "entirely with friends" on Twitter or Facebook, which could be "fun or totally awful". Mika had always started the games he made with his friends by drawing a box, asking his friends what he should make with it and going from there. He decided to repeat this method, but this time he asked his Twitter followers for help. Later that day, Mika posted a tweet containing an image of a red box standing among white and gray platforms. He asked his followers, "Where to go with this? I've started a new project, it draws a red box. Thinking platformer. #helpmedev". Ideas quickly poured in, such as adding a morality system and making the box a movie renter. Mika initially engaged with these suggestions just for fun. The latter idea was adopted the same day, and in a new tweet, Mika indicated he had added collision and gravity to the game. Mika played with various ideas loosely, including a group of soda cans which navigated around the world with their fizz, sharing his progress on Vine and repeated tweets. However, he could not settle on a solid unifying idea or ultimate goal until January 10, when video game designer Brandon Sheffield suggested that Mika add a ball, which players would carry and attempt to score in a goal, but could also steal from each other. Mika responded, "I LOVE THIS IDEA. Gonna run with this." Development of the game was built around these Twitter suggestions, unified under the hashtag #IDARB, for It Draws a Red Box.

Development progressed quickly afterwards, with Mika and the Other Ocean team focusing on sports mechanics, though they still constantly implemented ideas from Mika's Twitter followers. As the game grew, Chris Charla, Mika's friend and the head of Microsoft's ID@Xbox initiative, asked if #IDARB could be ported to the Xbox One. According to Mika, Charla may also have been the first person to use the #IDARB name. Two months later, the game was showcased at the 2014 Game Developers Conference (GDC) in San Francisco. Microsoft focused on the game's ability to support eight players, as Sony's PlayStation could only support four at one time. At one point, cheers from the #IDARB booth drowned out a nearby presentation. Mika said that people were "blown away by how stupid it was". Eurogamer considered this version one of the "stand-out games" of the first 25 ID@Xbox games. This version of #IDARB was built in less than eight weeks.

Later that year, Twitch Plays Pokemon peaked in popularity, inspiring Mika to include a live element, which led to hashbombs. After this, the components which were most difficult for Mika to complete were the AI and the online multiplayer. The game's AI was designed to simply head toward the ball if it did not already have it. Online multiplayer used a "couch vs. couch" system to ensure that a group of players could only play against a group with the same number of players, drawing on Other Ocean's experience porting fighting games such as Mortal Kombat Arcade Kollection to the Xbox Live platform.

The game initially released exclusively for the Xbox One in January 2015, but in March, Microsoft announced that #IDARB would later be available on Windows 10, featuring crossplay with the Xbox One version. The game was eventually released on Windows on February 25, 2016. Upon release, the game was also available as a free download for Xbox Live Gold subscribers.

== Reception ==
Reception

Aggregate score
Aggregator	Score
Metacritic	77/100

Review scores
Publication	Score
Destructoid	8/10
Edge	6/10
Eurogamer	7/10
Game Informer	8.25/10
GameSpot	8/10
IGN	7.5/10
Polygon	8.5/10

During #IDARB's previews and releases, many reviewers struggled to describe the game. An official press release at an event to promote ID@Xbox in San Francisco in 2015 described it as "a chaotic 8-player eSport jumping jetpack future arena ball game that is as inspired by Bomberman and Smash Bros. as it is by cans of soda, paint-by-numbers books, and driving five miles faster than the speed limit". This carried over to reviews. IGN's Mitch Dyer described it as "part combo-based arcade game, part hockey, part basketball, and part Super Smash Bros." and Eurogamer's Daniel Starkey noted that the game was "welding the anarchy of Smash Bros., NES-era platforming, and Twitter hashtags into a curious pastiche ... an absolute farce". This chaos was frequently praised by reviewers. However, it was also often noted as too much, especially when three or four players were on each team. Polygon's Griffin McElroy called any more than two players per team "a bit inscrutable" with a four vs. four match being "batshit crazy". In this mode, they further stated that "just finding your own character will occupy most of your mental faculties". On the other hand, IGN felt that "with less than four players, IDARB sparks, but never quite catches fire". Review aggregator website Metacritic averaged review scores to a 77, indicating "generally favorable" reviews.

The speed, chaos, and easy-to-learn yet hard to master nature of the gameplay earned frequent praise. GameSpot's Tyler Hicks stated that it "stands as proof that all it takes to make a fantastic game, even with today's available technology, is a solid set of core gameplay mechanics with inherent depth", also praising the varied nature of the scoring system. Game Informer's Kyle Hilliard felt that the high skill ceiling meant it had potential "to become an intricate competitive game with skill-dependent tactics". Wired noted that players love #IDARB because "it's so damn easy to pick up" and matches ensure "everyone—players and spectators alike—has fun". IGN enjoyed the "hysterical screaming" each match conveyed with every player constantly scrambling to reach the ball. The mesh of ideas generated by the game's crowdsourced development was a similar target of praise. However, Eurogamer felt the game did not trust players to find their own fun, noting that #IDARB "can be a lot more fun to watch than it is to play". Noting the frequent randomness and means of development, Edge called the game "raucous yet ridiculous, funny yet infuriating". However, Wired noted that "crowdsourcing may not, and perhaps should not, replace conventional development methods", considering Other Ocean already had years of experience in developing games. They concluded by saying "ideas are only as good as the execution".

The online multiplayer was heavily criticized. Latency issues were common. IGN stated that they "made each match a crap-shoot in performance" and Destructoid's Jason Faulkner noted "a ton of stuttering", though other reviewers such as Polygon called the latency "a minor issue". In either case, the latency was noted for slowing down the gameplay, reducing the game's otherwise precise nature. The method of the online matchmaking was also criticized. A person could only play with as many people as were on their console. IGN considered this to have "neutered" the online gameplay, and Game Informer could not recommend the game to those uninterested in playing with others. Similar issues were faced with the local multiplayer. When there were an odd number of players, there was no way to even out the teams with an AI teammate, which IGN thought "led to one unhappy team every time".

Overall, Mika was happy with the game's success. In an interview with Windows Central, when asked about what he was most proud of with #IDARB, Mika responded: "That something I got to make and play with all my friends turned out so damn fun."
