= Paul E. Niemeyer =

Arcade cabinet artist

- Niemeyer at Dragon Con in 2026
- Occupations: Illustrator, Graphic Designer, Sculptor
- Years active: 1982–present
- Known for: Mortal Kombat arcade cabinet art and logo, arcade game side art for Bally Midway

Paul E. Niemeyer is an American illustrator, graphic designer, and sculptor best known for his work in the coin-operated video game, pinball, and tabletop game industries. He is widely recognized for illustrating the marquee, control panel, side art, and dragon logo for the original Mortal Kombat (1992) arcade cabinet.

== Education and early career ==
Niemeyer attended Eastern Illinois University, earning a double major in 1979 in 3D illustration and ceramic design. Prior to entering the video game industry, he worked for a sign-writing company in Chicago, where he developed skills in cut-screen production art and rapid marker rendering.

== Career ==
=== Bally Midway (1982–1984) ===
Niemeyer began his arcade game career in 1982 when he was hired by Midway, initially working under veteran pinball artist Paul Farris in the art department. His first assignment involved cutting color production screens for the cocktail cabinet version of Ms. Pac-Man.

Following the integration of Bally and Midway, Niemeyer contributed cabinet artwork, screen-layering graphic design, and promotional illustrations for prominent golden-age arcade games, including Tapper, Pac-Man Plus, Super Pac-Man, Professor Pac-Man, Discs of Tron, Satan's Hollow, Spy Hunter, and WACKO, alongside dozens of prototype cabinets.

=== Freelance Work and *Mortal Kombat* (1984–1990s) ===
In 1984, Niemeyer transitioned into freelance work. Alongside commercial design projects for Chicago advertising agencies and nature illustrations for the Department of Natural Resources, he continued designing arcade game graphics for titles such as Time Killers, Aeroboto, and Star Guards.

In late 1991, former Midway art director Greg Freres invited Niemeyer to create the cabinet art for an upcoming fighting game codenamed Dragon Attack. The project was officially titled Mortal Kombat during Niemeyer's initial design meeting. Working from pencil sketches and marker comps by series co-creator John Tobias, Niemeyer produced the finalized line art and color film separations for the arcade marquee, control panel, side cabinet art, and dragon logo. Niemeyer noted that his original illustration of the dragon emblem faced left, whereas starting with Mortal Kombat II, the emblem was flipped to face right. This was done to streamline trademarking the logo.

During the 1990s, Niemeyer also provided graphic design and promotional artwork for major Hollywood film campaigns, including Jurassic Park, Star Trek V: The Final Frontier, Men in Black, The Little Mermaid, and Star Wars: Episode I – The Phantom Menace. In 1993, he created graphic designs for Williams' Demolition Man pinball machine.

=== Board games, attractions, and pinball (2000–present) ===
In 2000, Niemeyer co-founded tabletop publisher Eagle Games, serving as creative director and lead artist. He illustrated strategy war games including The American Civil War, Napoleon in Europe, and ATTACK!, as well as board game adaptations of video game franchises such as Railroad Tycoon, Age of Steam, Age of Mythology, and Sid Meier's Civilization.

After Eagle Games was acquired by Gryphon Games in 2005, Niemeyer continued freelancing for publishers including Pegasus Games, UberPlay, and Esdevium Games. He also designed packaging and illustrations for mobile/casual video games developed by PopCap Games, including Peggle and Bejeweled 2.

From 2006 to 2016, Niemeyer operated the ABYSS Haunted House in Chicago, later expanding into prop design, fabrication, and sculpture for escape rooms and theme parks. In 2021, he earned his first published credit for 3D physical pinball sculpting with American Pinball's Legends of Valhalla. In 2022, he was added to the Walter Day Video Game Trading Card Collection (Card #4113).

== Gameography ==
=== Arcade Games ===
- Ms. Pac-Man (1982) – Production color screen art
- Pac-Man Plus (1982) – Graphic art
- Super Pac-Man (1982) – Graphic art
- Satan's Hollow (1982) – Cabinet art
- Discs of Tron (1983) – Environmental cabinet art
- Professor Pac-Man (1983) – Graphic art
- Spy Hunter (1983) – Cabinet/Graphic art
- Tapper (1984) – Graphic art
- WACKO (1984) – Cabinet art
- Star Guards (1987) – Arcade art
- Mortal Kombat (1992) – Cabinet side art, control panel, marquee, logo line art
- Time Killers (1992) – Arcade art

=== Tabletop & Casual Games ===
- Demolition Man (1993) – Pinball graphic design
- Bejeweled 2 (2004) – Packaging design & illustration
- Peggle (2007) – Packaging design & illustration
- Legends of Valhalla (2021) – Sculpted pinball art
