= Mortal Kombat (1992 video game) =

1992 fighting game

- North American cover art
- Developer: Midway (Note: Game Boy, Game Gear, Genesis, Master System, Amiga and MS-DOS versions developed by Probe Software; SNES version developed by Sculptured Software.)
- Publishers: Midway: Consoles; NA/EU: Acclaim Entertainment (Note: Released under the Arena Entertainment brand name on Sega systems.) MS-DOS; NA: Acclaim Entertainment; EU: Virgin Interactive Entertainment Amiga Virgin Interactive Entertainment Plug-and-play TV game Jakks Pacific
- Designers: Ed Boon; John Tobias
- Programmer: Ed Boon
- Artists: John Tobias; John Vogel
- Composer: Dan Forden
- Series: Mortal Kombat
- Platform: Arcade: Game Boy, Game Gear, Genesis/Mega Drive, Super NES, Master System, handheld electronic game, Sega CD, MS-DOS, Amiga, plug-and-play TV game
- Release: August 1992: Arcade; August 1992; Game Boy, Game Gear, Genesis/Mega Drive, Super NES; NA/EU: September 13, 1993; Master System; PAL: September 13, 1993; Sega CD; NA: April 1994; EU: July 1994; MS-DOS; NA: May 25, 1994; EU: 1994; Amiga; EU: 1994; Plug-and-play TV game; NA: 2005
- Genre: Fighting
- Modes: Single-player, multiplayer
- Arcade system: Midway Y Unit (Revision Prototype 4.0–Revision 4.0); Midway T Unit (Revision 4.0T–Revision 5.0T)

Mortal Kombat is a 1992 fighting game developed and published by Midway for arcades. It is the first main installment in the Mortal Kombat franchise, and was subsequently released by Acclaim Entertainment for nearly every home platform of the time. The game presents a martial arts tournament in which ten characters (including a choice of seven player characters) contend with the fate of Earth at stake. It introduced many key aspects of the Mortal Kombat series, including the unique five-button control scheme and gory finishing moves called Fatalities.

Mortal Kombat is considered by critics to be one of the greatest video games ever made. It spawned numerous sequels and spin-offs, beginning with Mortal Kombat II in 1993. Both games were the subject of a film adaptation in 1995. However, it also sparked much controversy for its depiction of extreme violence and gore using realistic digitized graphics and, along with the home releases of Night Trap and Lethal Enforcers, prompted the formation of the Entertainment Software Rating Board (ESRB), a U.S. government-backed organization that set descriptor ratings for video games.

== Gameplay ==
Screenshot of a fight between Raiden and Liu Kang

Mortal Kombat is a fighting game in which players battle opponents in 1v1 matches. The fighter that drains the opponent's health bar first wins the round, and the first to win two rounds wins the match. Each round is timed; if both fighters have health remaining when time runs out, the one with more health wins. Two players can start a game together, or a second player can join in during a single player's game to fight against them. If a game was in progress at the time, the winner continues it alone; if not, the winner begins a new game.

Mortal Kombat uses an 8-directional joystick and 5 buttons, including 2 punch and 2 kick buttons, each further differentiated between high and low. Attacks can vary depending on the player's distance from the opponent. All player characters have a shared set of attacks performed by holding the joystick in various directions, such as a leg sweep and an uppercut. The latter attack knocks the enemy high into the air and causes much damage. Most special moves were performed by tapping the joystick, sometimes ending with a button press. Unlike previous one-on-one fighting games, few moves require circular joystick movement. The game's blocking system also distinguished itself from other fighting games, as characters take a small amount of damage from regular moves while blocking. However, the dedicated block button allows users to defend against attacks without retreating. Blocking characters lose very little ground when struck, thus making counterattacks much easier after a successful block.

Mortal Kombat further introduced the concept of "juggling", knocking an opponent into the air and following up with a combination of attacks while the enemy is still airborne and defenseless. The idea became so popular that it spread to many other games. Another of the game's innovations was the Fatality, a finishing move performed against a defeated opponent to execute them in a gruesome fashion.

In the single-player game, the player faces each of the 7 playable characters in a series of 1v1 matches against computer-controlled opponents, ending in a "Mirror Match" against a duplicate of the player's chosen character. The player must then fight in 3 endurance matches, each involving 2 other playable characters. When the player defeats the first opponent, the second one enters the arena, and the timer resets; however, the player's health meter does not regenerate. After the third endurance match, the player fights the sub-boss Goro, followed by a final match against Shang Tsung.

Between certain levels, players can compete in a minigame called "Test Your Might" for bonus points, breaking blocks of various materials by filling a meter past a certain point through rapid button presses. The first material the player must break is wood, followed by stone, steel, ruby, and finally diamond, with each successive material requiring more of the meter to be filled up and thus awarding more points. Two players can compete in the minigame at once, and the last two materials are only accessible through two-player mode. The minigame returned in various forms in Mortal Kombat: Deadly Alliance, Mortal Kombat: Shaolin Monks, Mortal Kombat vs. DC Universe, Mortal Kombat: Komplete Edition, Mortal Kombat X, and its DLC counterpart, Mortal Kombat XL.

== Plot ==
The game takes place in Earthrealm, where a tournament is being held on Shang Tsung's Island, on which seven of its locations serve as stages in the game. The introduction to Mortal Kombat explains that Shang Tsung was banished to Earthrealm 500 years ago and, with the help of the monstrous Goro, seized control of the Mortal Kombat tournament in an attempt to doom the realm. For 500 years straight, Goro has been undefeated in the tournament and has won nine consecutive tournaments. If Goro wins again, Shao Kahn, Emperor of Outworld, will be allowed to take Earthrealm. To prevent this, a new generation of warriors must challenge Goro.

According to the Mortal Kombat series' canon, Liu Kang wins this tournament under Raiden's guidance, defeating Goro and Shang Tsung and freeing the many souls that Tsung had imprisoned over the centuries. Scorpion pursues Sub-Zero and finally faces him after the end of the tournament, killing him and avenging his death. Sonya rescues her special forces squad, who had been held hostage by Shang Tsung. However, she fails to apprehend Kano, who escapes the island on a boat. Reptile, unsure of his fate, flees to Outworld. Raiden then teleports the surviving Earthrealmers to safety as Shang Tsung's island crumbles into the sea. Returning to Hollywood, Johnny Cage uses the experience to revive his failing acting career and develops a highly popular film franchise, Mortal Kombat. In Outworld, an outraged Shao Kahn refuses to accept the tournament's outcome, setting up the events of the second game. The player receives information about the characters in biographies displayed during the attract mode. The bulk of the game's backstory and lore was only told in a comic book, but some additional information about the characters and their motivations for entering the tournament is received upon completion of the game with each character.

== Characters ==
Mortal Kombat character selection screen, showing Kano (left) and Sub-Zero (right)

Mortal Kombat includes seven playable characters, each with their own unique Fatality and all of whom would eventually become trademark characters and appear in several sequels. The game was developed with digitized sprites based on real actors.

Ho-Sung Pak plays Liu Kang, a former member of the secret White Lotus Society who enters the tournament representing the Shaolin temples. He is tasked by Raiden to win the tournament and save Earthrealm. Originally envisioned as a monk, Pak refused to shave his head for the role, leading Kang's final design to more closely resemble actor Bruce Lee.

Elizabeth Malecki plays the Special Forces agent Sonya Blade, who enters in pursuit of the dangerous Black Dragon organization. Her team is captured and held hostage by Shang Tsung, forcing Sonya to participate in the tournament. Sonya was inspired by actress Cynthia Rothrock.

Richard Divizio portrays Kano, a savage criminal and mercenary. Kano is a member of the Black Dragon, a powerful organized crime syndicate. He is described as a Caucasian man orphaned as a child in Japan, and his vicious nature led him to be raised in the Japanese underworld. In later games his origin was retconned, establishing him as having an Australian background, partially as a tribute to the late Trevor Goddard, who portrayed him as Australian in the 1995 film. Kano cares little for the tournament and seeks to steal Shang Tsung's treasures. He is also a cyborg, having one of his eyes and part of his face replaced with cybernetic implants.

Carlos Pesina plays Raiden (spelled "Rayden" in the MS-DOS and console ports), a thunder god and guardian of Earthrealm who competes in the tournament as a mortal, and seeks to guide Liu Kang and the other Earthrealmers to victory.

Daniel Pesina, Carlos' brother, plays the Hollywood movie star Johnny Cage. Cage's acting career has faltered and he seeks victory in the tournament as a way of reigniting his fame. He is loosely based on Jean-Claude Van Damme, particularly his performance in the film Bloodsport.

Daniel Pesina also portrays the undead revenant Scorpion, a ninja from the Japanese clan Shirai Ryu who was murdered in cold blood by Sub-Zero some time prior to the events of the game and brought back to life to avenge his own death. Scorpion possesses a fire-based finishing move.

The yellow color of Scorpion's outfit was changed to blue to create his rival and murderer Sub-Zero, a ruthless assassin and member of the Lin Kuei, a mysterious clan of "Chinese ninjas." Armed with ice-generating powers, Sub-Zero has entered the tournament specifically to assassinate Shang Tsung, having been offered an enormous bounty to do so. Mortal Kombat would become famous for such palette swaps that would continue to be used in later games as the technique to create new characters.

The four-armed warrior and a prince of Outworld, Goro serves as the sub-boss of the game; being a half-human, half-dragon beast, he is much stronger than the other characters and can be unaffected by throw attacks. Goro has won the last nine tournaments consecutively, and will allow Outworld to conquer Earthrealm if he wins the tenth tournament. The character's sprites are based on a stop motion model which was created by Curt Chiarelli.

Shang Tsung, the game's main antagonist and final boss (who was played by two actors, Eric Kincade and Ho-Sung Pak, although only the latter is credited in the actual game) is a sorcerer who can transform into any playable character in the game at any time during a battle. He serves Emperor Shao Kahn, but secretly possesses ambitions of his own. Shang Tsung is centuries old, having stolen the souls of slain warriors to prolong his own life.

When fighting on the Pit stage, the player could qualify to fight the secret character Reptile, a green-clad palette swap of Scorpion and Sub-Zero who uses both characters' moves, by meeting a special set of conditions in later revisions of the arcade game. Reptile is given no backstory in-game, but later games establish him as a humanoid reptilian who believes himself to be the last living member of his species and although he personally opposes the conquest of Earthrealm, Reptile serves Shang Tsung, having been falsely promised by Tsung that he would revive his species if Outworld wins the tournament.

Goro, Shang Tsung, and Reptile were CPU-only characters. The Masked Guard in the Courtyard stage was portrayed by Mortal Kombat developer John Vogel.

Rumors were spread of two characters, Ermac and Nimbus Terrafaux, who were also supposedly secret fighters in the game. However, the name Ermac was the result of a text glitch and the character did not really exist, while Nimbus was a prank started by Electronic Gaming Monthly. The developers liked the idea of Ermac so much that he was made into a real playable fighter in Ultimate Mortal Kombat 3.

== Development ==
Mortal Kombat creators Ed Boon and John Tobias have stated that Midway Games tasked them with the project of developing a "combat game for release within a year", which the two believed was intended to compete with the popular Street Fighter II. According to Tobias, he and Boon had envisioned a fighting game similar to Data East's Karate Champ but featuring large digitized characters even before that, and the success of Capcom's Street Fighter II only helped them convince the management of their idea. Boon said the development team initially consisted of four people — himself as programmer, artists John Tobias and John Vogel, and Dan Forden as sound designer. The game's budget was around $1 million.

According to Richard Divizio and Daniel Pesina, Mortal Kombat had actually begun when Tobias along with Divizio and the brothers Daniel and Carlos Pesina planned to create a ninja-themed fighting game. However, this idea was rejected by Midway's management. Instead, Midway sought to make an action game based on the upcoming movie Universal Soldier and featuring a digitized version of martial arts film star Jean-Claude Van Damme, but he was already in negotiations with another company for a video game that ultimately was never released. Divizio then convinced Tobias to return to their original project. In the end, Van Damme was parodied in the game in the form of Johnny Cage (with whom he shares his name's initials, JC), a narcissistic Hollywood movie star who performs a split punch to the groin in a nod to a scene from Bloodsport. Tobias credited other inspirations as having come from the Asian martial arts cinema.

Boon later said, "since the beginning, one of the things that's separated us from other fighting games is the crazy moves we've put in it, like fireballs and all the magic moves, so to speak." According to Tobias, the game's ultraviolent content had not been originally intended and was only implemented gradually as the development progressed. The concept of Fatalities in particular evolved from the "dizzied" mechanic in earlier fighting games. Boon said that he hated the "dizzied" mechanic, but that it was fun to have one's opponent get dizzied and get in a free hit. Boon and Tobias decided they could eliminate the aggravation of getting dizzied by having it occur at the end of the fight, after the outcome had already been decided. An early version of the game used two more buttons for middle punch and kick attacks.

In late 1991, former Midway art director Greg Freres invited Paul Niemeyer to create the cabinet art for an upcoming fighting game codenamed Dragon Attack. The project was officially titled Mortal Kombat during Niemeyer's initial design meeting. Working from pencil sketches and marker comps by series co-creator John Tobias, Niemeyer produced the finalized line art and color film separations for the arcade marquee, control panel, side cabinet art, and dragon logo. Niemeyer noted that his original illustration of the dragon emblem faced left, whereas starting with Mortal Kombat II, the emblem was flipped to face right.

Mortal Kombat was reportedly developed in 10 months from 1991 to 1992, with a test version seeing limited release halfway through the development cycle. As a demo version of the game, which featured only six characters (all male), became internally popular within Midway offices, the team was given more time to work on it, resulting in the addition of Sonya to the roster. Footage for the game's digitized characters was filmed with Tobias' personal Hi-8 camcorder. The final arcade game used eight megabytes of graphics data, with each character having 64 colors and around 300 frames of animation.

The team had difficulty settling on a name for the game. Ed Boon has stated that for six months during development "nobody could come up with a name nobody didn't hate." Some of the names suggested were Kumite, Dragon Attack, Death Blow, and Fatality. One day, someone had written down "combat" on the drawing board for the names in Boon's office and someone wrote a K over the C, according to Boon, "just to be kind of weird." Pinball designer Steve Ritchie was sitting in Boon's office, saw the word "Kombat" and said to him, "Why don't you name it Mortal Kombat?", a name that Boon stated "just stuck." John Tobias recalled this a bit differently, saying it "came about during the trademark process in naming the game. We really liked Mortal Combat as a name, but it couldn't get past legal." Since then, the series has begun frequently using the letter K in place of the letter C when it has the hard C sound.

== Release ==
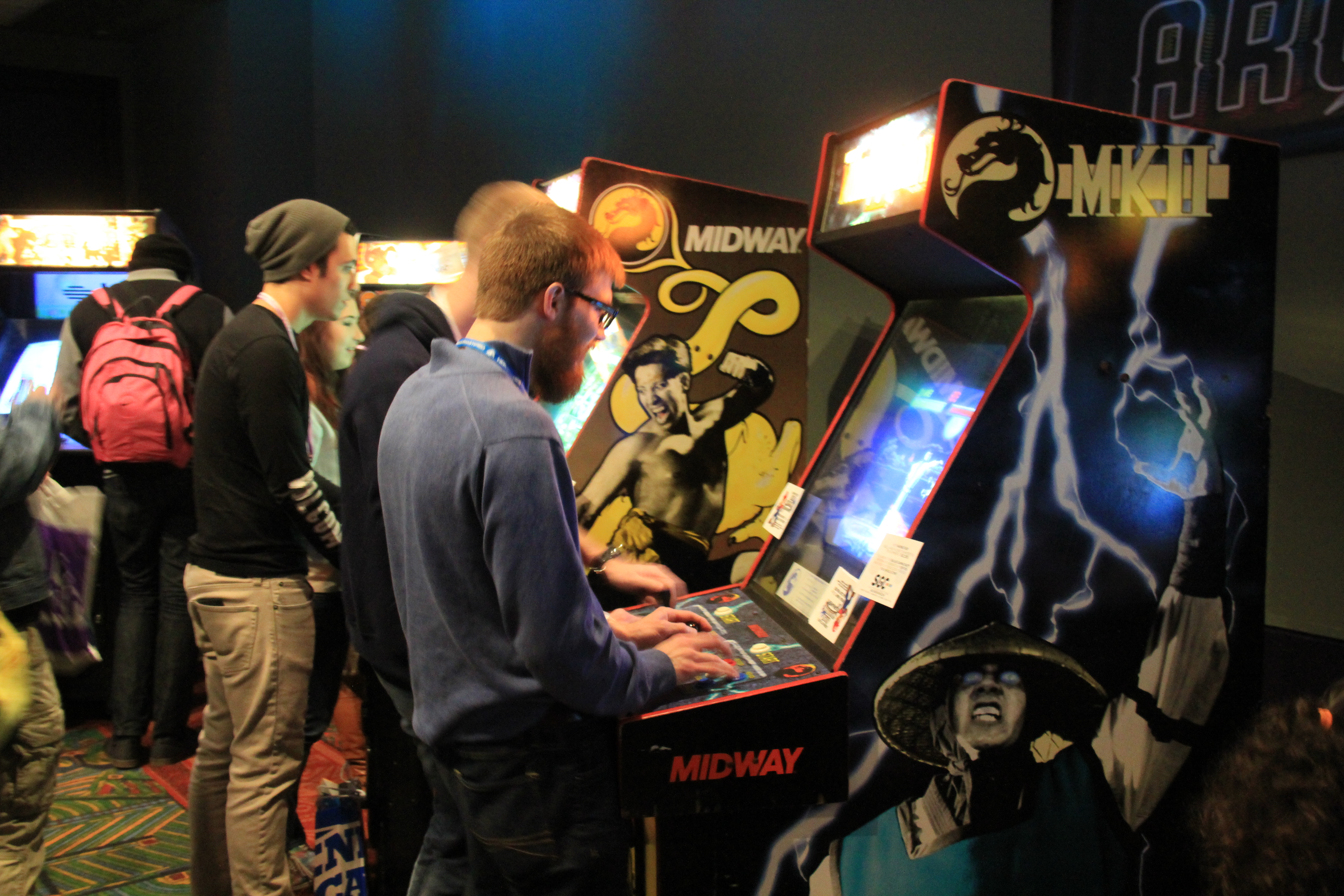
Mortal Kombat and Mortal Kombat II arcade cabinets at PAX South 2015

While the arcade version of Mortal Kombat was unlocalized for Japan, it had an official release there in 1992 by Taito, who published imports of Midway's games in the Japanese market.

The launch of Mortal Kombat for home consoles by Acclaim Entertainment was one of the largest video game launches of the time. TV commercials heralded the simultaneous release of all four home versions of the game, SNES, Genesis, Game Boy, and Game Gear, on September 13, 1993, a date dubbed "Mortal Monday". The "Mortal Monday" marketing campaign was also promoted in Spain under the slogan "Lunes Mortal", with advertisements announcing the September 13, 1993, release of the Mega Drive, Game Gear, Game Boy and Super Nintendo versions. In the same year, a comic book, Mortal Kombat Collector's Edition, was written and illustrated by the game's designer artist John Tobias and made available through mail order, describing the backstory of the game in greater detail. The comic was advertised during the game's attract mode and would later be sold, although it was quite difficult to get a copy outside of the United States. The comic was later included as a series of unlockable bonuses in Mortal Kombat: Deadly Alliance.

Mortal Kombat: The Album, an album by The Immortals featuring techno music, was released in May 1994. It features two themes for the game, "Techno Syndrome" and "Hypnotic House", as well as themes written for each character. "Techno Syndrome" was adapted for the 1995 movie soundtrack and incorporated the "Mortal Kombat!" yell from the Mortal Monday commercials. Jeff Rovin penned a novelization of Mortal Kombat, which was published in June 1995 in order to coincide with the release of the film. There were lines of action figures based on the game's characters.

== Ports and re-releases ==
Sub-Zero's Fatality move in the SNES (top) and Genesis (bottom, with blood cheat applied) ports of Mortal Kombat, showcasing the difference in violence levels

Four ports were released in North America and Europe as part of the "Mortal Monday" campaign in 1993: home console ports for the Super NES and Sega Genesis, and handheld console ports for the Game Boy and Game Gear. While the SNES version's visuals and audio were more arcade accurate than those of the Genesis version, it has less precise controls and due to Nintendo's "family friendly" policies, replaces the blood with sweat and most of the Fatalities with less violent "finishing moves". The sweat effect, which was a palette coloration added after Nintendo's decision to censor the game, could be reverted to the original red blood color via a Game Genie code input as "BDB4-DD07". On the Genesis version, the blood and uncensored Fatalities were available via a cheat code, spelled out "ABACABB", a nod to the 1981 album Abacab by the English rock band Genesis, who shared their name with the North American version of the console. This version was given an MA-13 rating by the Videogame Rating Council.

The Game Boy version was largely cut down from its arcade counterpart. It had laggy controls and a limited button layout. It also omitted Johnny Cage, Reptile and the bloodier Fatality moves. However, players could play as Goro via a code. Johnny Cage was apparently intended to be a playable character, but was cut out. Bits of his character data remain in the data files. The Game Gear version was similar to the Game Boy version, but with major improvements (color, faster gameplay, and tighter controls). Like its 16-bit counterpart, the game was censored unless a cheat code (2, 1, 2, Down, Up) had been entered, but lacked Kano and Reptile. A Master System port based on the Game Gear version was released exclusively for PAL regions on the same day as all the aforementioned platforms. According to Phylene Riggs of Acclaim, an NES port was also planned at one point, but cancelled before it entered the programming stage.

A port for MS-DOS was released in late 1993.It is the most accurate port of the arcade version in terms of graphics and gameplay. It was released on floppy disk and later CD-ROM upgraded with the original arcade music and sound effects. An Amiga version was released in late 1993 in Europe only, with graphics based on the Genesis version, controls limited to either one or two action buttons, and a minimal soundtrack with music arranged by Allister Brimble. The DOS version was eventually released on GOG.com.

The Sega CD version of the game was released with a video intro of the Mortal Monday commercial. This port did not require a code to be entered to access the uncensored content and thus was given an MA-17 rating. While this port was technologically inferior to the better-looking SNES port and had loading times, it resembled the arcade version more faithfully in actual gameplay. It also featured the authentic CD-DA soundtrack, taken directly from the arcade version, but some of the arenas feature the wrong music (such as Courtyard playing the Pit's theme). Several remixes of the Mortal Kombat theme music were included as bonus features, including the remix used later for the film adaptation. Some copies of this version are incompatible with model 1.1 of the Sega CD; Acclaim offered to replace any such discs that were mailed to their Oyster Bay headquarters with working copies.

Mortal Kombat was later released in Japan for the Super Famicom, Game Boy, Mega Drive and Game Gear as Mortal Kombat: Legend of the Advent God Fist (モータルコンバット 神拳降臨伝説, Mōtaru Konbatto: Shinken Kōrin Densetsu) and for the Mega-CD as Mortal Kombat: Legend of the Advent God Fist - Extended Edition (モータルコンバット 神拳降臨伝説 完全版, Mōtaru Konbatto: Shinken Kōrin Densetsu - Kanzenhan) with no major changes from their western releases.

A conversion of the game being developed by Iguana Entertainment was scheduled to be published on the Atari Jaguar, but it was never released.

In 2004, Jakks Pacific released the game as one of its Plug It in & Play TV Games, developed by Digital Eclipse. It is a unique port made directly from the arcade code by Chris Burke, who was the sole programmer on the port. Due to hardware limitations from the uncommon processor used by the Jakks Pacific units, the backgrounds are static and feature no parallax scrolling.

Also in 2004, the premium edition of Mortal Kombat: Deception on the PlayStation 2 and original Xbox included the game as bonus content played via emulation of the original arcade code, which was ported by Digital Eclipse. While it was promoted as "arcade perfect", there were some emulation issues with the sound and gameplay.

The game was also a part of the 2005 compilation Midway Arcade Treasures: Extended Play, also developed by Digital Eclipse. Like the Mortal Kombat: Deception release, it has sound issues. On August 31, 2011, Warner Bros. Games released Mortal Kombat Arcade Kollection, co-developed by NetherRealm Studios, Other Ocean Interactive and Code Mystics, consisting of Mortal Kombat, Mortal Kombat II and Ultimate Mortal Kombat 3, as a downloadable title for Microsoft Windows, PlayStation 3, and Xbox 360.

After the lukewarm response to the Super NES version of the game, developer Sculptured Software, who handled theport, proposed releasing an updated version for the system titled Mortal Kombat Nitro, with additional content such as new costumes, an expanded story mode with multiple endings, and Goro, Shang Tsung and Reptile made playable in addition to the restoration of the original fatalities and blood. Although a prototype was made, development was halted in order to fully focus on the Super NES port of Mortal Kombat II.

== Legacy and reception ==
In the United States, RePlay reported Mortal Kombat to be the second most popular upright arcade cabinet of September 1992. It then topped the RePlay upright arcade cabinet charts from October to November 1992, then from February to March 1993, and then in November 1993. It also topped the Play Meter arcade chart in December 1992. It was the second top-grossing arcade game of Summer 1993, below NBA Jam, according to RePlay. It was one of 1993's top two highest-grossing arcade games in the United States (along with NBA Jam), exceeding the $300,000,000 (equivalent to $670,000,000 in 2025) domestic box office gross of the film Jurassic Park the same year. It also topped the Sega CD sales chart in June 1994.

In November 1993, Acclaim announced that they had shipped more than three million copies of Mortal Kombat for home systems, counting the SNES, Genesis, Game Boy and Game Gear versions combined. The game sold 3 million copies worldwide in its first three weeks of release. In the United States, it was the top-selling game for the Genesis, SNES, and Game Gear in 1993, with the Genesis version being the overall best-selling console game of the year; it remained the top Genesis and SNES game in January 1994. In the United Kingdom, it was the top-selling home video game of October 1993, the top-selling Master System game from May to August 1994, and the top-selling Mega CD game of June 1994. It would go on to become the best-selling home video game of 1993 in the UK, selling more than 400,000 copies across its console versions.

By July 1994, the console versions of the game had sold more than 6 million units worldwide and grossed over $300,000,000 (equivalent to $670,000,000 in 2025) in sales revenue. By 2000, it has sold 6.5 million cartridges across all home consoles, with the Genesis version accounting for the majority of sales. An additional million cartridges of the Game Boy version were sold. By 2002, the original arcade version had sold 24,000 arcade units and grossed an estimated $570 million. The game also generated licensing fees from films and TV shows, bringing total game and licensing revenue to $1.5 billion as of 2002.

=== Reviews ===
Reception

Aggregate score
Aggregator	Score					
Aggregator	Amiga	Arcade	Game Boy	Game Gear	Sega Genesis	SNES
GameRankings	N/A	N/A	N/A	N/A	84.17% (3 reviews)	83.33% (3 reviews)

Review scores
Publication	Score					
Publication	Amiga	Arcade	Game Boy	Game Gear	Sega Genesis	SNES
AllGame	N/A	4/5	N/A	N/A	N/A	3.5/5
Computer and Video Games	93%	72%	N/A	N/A	N/A	N/A
Electronic Gaming Monthly	N/A	N/A	N/A	N/A	8.25/10; 6.25/10 (SCD)	7.25/10
Famitsu	N/A	N/A	5/10, 4/10, 5/10, 3/10	6/10, 6/10, 6/10, 4/10	8/10, 7/10, 7/10, 7/10; 8/10, 7/10, 7/10, 7/10(SCD)	8/10, 6/10, 8/10, 8/10
GamesMaster	N/A	N/A	N/A	N/A	81%	81%
Sinclair User	N/A	69%	N/A	N/A	N/A	N/A
Mega	N/A	N/A	N/A	N/A	82%	N/A
Electronic Games	N/A	N/A	N/A	N/A	92%	96%

The arcade game received mixed reviews upon release from Computer and Video Games and Sinclair User. The digitized sprite graphics were praised and compared favorably with Pit-Fighter, but the gameplay was compared unfavorably with Street Fighter II and Fatal Fury 2.

Upon release on home systems, the game received generally positive reviews. GamePro hailed the SNES port of Mortal Kombat as having graphics closer to the arcade version than the other three initial home ports, with cleaner definition and a better color palette, and said that while four of the fatalities had been cut, the new finishing moves which replace them "are pretty cool, though not as bloody." Comparing it to the Genesis version, they found that the controls are less responsive but the sound is better due to the higher quality and inclusion of the announcer's voice. They concluded, "Despite some control glitches and the altered Fatality Moves, Mortal Kombat for the SNES is a great representation of an arcade classic that will more than satisfy most gamers." However, the Nintendo version's widely reported censorship of blood and dismemberments affected sales, and was widely criticized by gaming media for censorship issues into the following decades. In 2006, IGN named it as the eighth worst arcade-to-console conversion. Nintendo's decision to make the game more family-friendly was also included on GameSpy's list of the dumbest moments in gaming. Reviewing the Super NES release, Nintendo Power praised the games graphics, animation and sound as "excellent" while noting that four of the finishing moves are unidentical to the arcade game. The review criticized the game as "pretty easy unless you set the difficulty to hard."

GamePro's review of the Genesis port echoed the comparisons mentioned in their SNES review, but noted that while all the arcade version fatalities are included in "Mode A", they are noticeably cruder in appearance. They also criticized the fact that the port was developed for the three-button controller, saying this makes some moves awkward to pull off, but concluded, "Great graphics, sound, and control in combination with the special Mode A setting make the Genesis Mortal Kombat a beat-em-up force."

Highly praising the graphical detail and sharpness, as well as the bloody action when the violence code is enabled, GamePro declared the Game Gear version to be "everything its 16-bit big brother is, plus it's portable." They noted that the audio is fairly basic and, as with all four initial home ports, it has issues with the controls, but considered it an overall impressive achievement for a portable system. It later won GamePro's 1993 hand-held game of the year award.

Bill Kunkel wrote in Electronic Games that both Genesis and Super NES ports of the game as "superb, first-rate conversions" noting that the SNES edition graphically was better than the Sega Genesis version while noting that "the characters, while they don't move quite as quickly as their Genesis counterparts, are magnificently animated." Kunkel noted the exception of the character Goro who "suffers from comparatively crude animation". Kunkel noted the difficulty in pulling off the moves in the game, finding that some players will "be frustrated by the awkwardness of the commands" and that "those unfamiliar with the game will frequently find themselves accidentally discharging specialty moves while attempting a simple spin kick or other stunt."

Reviewing the Game Boy version, GamePro commented, "If you think the moves on the other systems are hard to execute, wait until you try to pull a move on the Game Boy. The unresponsive two-button controls are almost impossible to master. The game play is also abysmally slow, and the fighters don't always connect, even when they're close to an opponent." Additionally bemoaning the difficult-to-discern graphics, weak animation, and minimal sound, they deemed it the worst version of the game. Reviewing the Game Boy version of the game, Nintendo Power stated that the graphic have been simplified but that "the essence of the Super NES and arcade games have been well-preserved" while noting that "the animation, not surprisingly, is considerably slower than the Super NES."

The Sega CD version was even more harshly criticized by gaming media. The reviewers of Electronic Gaming Monthly described it as over-hyped with only minor improvements over the Genesis version, and complained of the lag times. GamePro similarly commented "The original Mortal Kombat is back, this time on CD, and you'd think there'd be some improvements. Think again." They criticized that the load times between fights and lag times during fights "give the game a quirky, out-of-touch feel."

From retrospective reviews, Nick Thorpe and Darran Jones of Retro Gamer found the game had an interesting character roster and that the blocking ability that was not featured in many fighters would make players rethink gameplay strategies. The review summarized that it was inferior to Street Fighter II and that the game's main appeal was its graphics and gory content and "proved that you didn't need to have amazing game mechanics in order to be popular."

=== Accolades ===
Electronic Gaming Monthly awarded Mortal Kombat the title of "Most Controversial Game of 1993". In 1995, the Daily News wrote, "the original Mortal Kombat video game debuted in 1992. Its combination of story line, character and mega-violence soon made it a hit worldwide. And the controversy engendered by its blood-gushing special effects only served to boost its popularity." In 1996, GamesMaster listed the arcade version 81st in their "Top 100 Games of All Time." In 1995, Flux magazine rated the arcade version 5th on its "Top 100 Video Games." They praised the digitized graphics, storyline, gameplay and characters. In 2004, readers of Retro Gamer voted Mortal Kombat as the 55th top retro game, with the staff commenting that "future versions would address the limitations of the first game, but this is where it all began." CraveOnline ranked it second of the top ten 2D fighters of all time, and Forbes called Mortal Kombat one of the "most loved arcade games" that was "king of the arcade" in its day, writing that the arcade machines of the original title sell for any price between a few hundred dollars to $2,500. In 2011, Complex ranked the first Mortal Kombat as the 12th best fighting game of all time, while Wirtualna Polska ranked it as the 19th best Amiga game. In 2012, Time named it one of the 100 greatest video games of all time. In 2013, the first Mortal Kombat was ranked as the best arcade game of the 1990s by Complex (the sequel, which "took everything we loved about the original and magnified it by about a million," was given sixth place on the list). In 2019, The Strong National Museum of Play inducted Mortal Kombat to its World Video Game Hall of Fame.

=== Controversy ===
Mortal Kombat was one of many violent video games that came into prominence between 1992 and 1993, generating controversy among parents and public officials. Hearings on video game violence and the corruption of society, headed by Senators Joseph Lieberman and Herb Kohl, were held in late 1992 to 1993. The legislators were especially concerned with the realistic replica of human figures in games, such as Mortal Kombat, Night Trap, Doom and Lethal Enforcers, as opposed to cartoonish characters in other violent games such as Eternal Champions or Time Killers. The result of the hearings was that the entertainment software industry was given one year to form a working rating system or the federal government would intervene and create its own system. Eventually, the Entertainment Software Rating Board (ESRB) was conceived, requiring all video games to be rated and for these ratings to be placed on the games's packaging.
