= Yu-Gi-Oh! Legacy of the Duelist =

2015 video game

- Developer: Other Ocean Interactive
- Publisher: Konami
- Platforms: Windows; Xbox One; PlayStation 4
- Release: 2015
- Genre: Digital collectible card game
- Mode: Single player

Yu-Gi-Oh! Legacy of the Duelist is a 2015 video game from Other Ocean Interactive.

== Gameplay ==
In Yu-Gi-Oh! Legacy of the Duelist, players enter a sprawling digital archive of the franchise's card-battling legacy, where gameplay unfolds as both a strategic duel simulator and a nostalgic reenactment of the anime's most iconic battles. The campaign mode is structured around the major series arcs—Duel Monsters, GX, 5D's, ZEXAL, and ARC-V—allowing players to relive pivotal duels using character-specific decks that mirror their televised counterparts. Each duel can be played from either side, effectively doubling the campaign's scope and inviting players to master both protagonist and antagonist strategies. Deck-building is central: over 6,000 cards are available in the base game, spanning generations of releases. Players can construct custom decks or use prebuilt ones tied to the storyline. Winning duels earns "duelist points," a currency used to buy randomized card packs themed around characters and series. The game includes optional DLC packs with exclusive cards and extra duels. Strategically, the game leans into puzzle-like mechanics. Success often depends on understanding the strengths and weaknesses of each deck rather than brute force. The game offers hints after losses, providing tactical insight.

== Reception ==
Reception

Review scores
Publication	Score
GameZone	8/10
Push Square	8/10
Hardcore Gamer	4.5/5
Digitally Downloaded	3/5

GameZone said "Hardcore fans of Yu-Gi-Oh! will undoubtedly find a lot to love in this card battling simulator. While it is quite bare bones when it comes to visuals, its simplicity allows for faster-paced gameplay".

Push Square said "Yu-Gi-Oh! Legacy of the Duelist is the ultimate version of arguably one of the best card duelling games on the planet. Essentially a virtual version of the real thing, it probably won't entice those who don't like the franchise, but for die-hard fans and interested newcomers, this is a game that offers unlimited hours of battling fun. If you've ever enjoyed Yu-Gi-Oh!, you owe it to yourself to give this a chance".
