= CSI: Unsolved =

2010 video game

CSI: Unsolved!
- Developer: Other Ocean Interactive
- Publisher: Ubisoft
- Series: CSI
- Platform: Nintendo DS
- Release: NA: 23 November 2010; EU: 26 November 2010
- Genre: Adventure
- Mode: Single-player

CSI: Unsolved! is a video game based on the CSI: Crime Scene Investigation television series developed by Canadian studio Other Ocean Interactive. It is the tenth CSI game released, including CSI: Miami and CSI: NY. It was released on 23 November 2010 for the Nintendo DS, along with CSI: Fatal Conspiracy on consoles and the PC.

== Gameplay ==
Players engage in a variety of crime-solving mini-games, including toxicology screening, bullet comparisons, UV light for investigations, and sample comparison.

== Reception ==
Reception

Aggregate scores
Aggregator	Score
GameRankings	62%
Metacritic	61/100

Review score
Publication	Score
Adventure Gamers	3/5

The game was met with mixed reviews, as GameRankings gave it a score of 62%, while Metacritic gave it 61 out of 100.
