= Project Winter =

2019 video game

- Developer: Other Ocean Interactive
- Publishers: Other Ocean Interactive; Boltrend Games (mobile)
- Platforms: Windows; Xbox One; Nintendo Switch; PlayStation 4; iOS; Android
- Release: Windows; May 23, 2019; Xbox One; January 26, 2021; PlayStation 4, Switch; September 16, 2021 iOS, Android; August 31, 2022
- Genres: Social deduction, survival
- Mode: Multiplayer

Project Winter is a social deduction video game featuring survival game mechanics first released on May 23, 2019, for Windows. In Project Winter, players take on the roles of "survivors" and "traitors", having to repair two objectives to escape from an incoming blizzard, or stop an escape from happening.

== Gameplay ==
Project Winter features a mix of survival and social deduction game mechanics. A single lobby consists of 5-8 players, the majority of whom are survivors. The survivors must search the map for bunkers and similar structures, containing parts required to fix objectives, as well as gear to strengthen themselves. The game also uses a crafting system as an alternative to scavenging. There are a variety of objectives, each requiring a different method to be fixed (some need parts, others do not). In order to win, the survivors must locate and repair two objectives and call for help within 30 minutes.

The traitors' goal is preventing the survivors from winning. They have the ability to sabotage their surroundings in order to obstruct survivors, in addition to exclusive access to 'traitor crates' which often contain useful items.

The game also features several other survival aspects. Players must observe their health, heat, and hunger bars in order to not die and watch out for the local wildlife.

The game utilizes proximity chat.

== Console ports ==
The Xbox port was announced in early 2021 and released on January 26, 2021. The ports for both the Nintendo Switch and the PlayStation 4 were aimed to be released sometime in 2021, eventually being released on September 16.

== Project Winter Mobile ==
Project Winter Mobile was first announced in July 2022, as pre-registrations for the mobile port had started the same day. The announced and eventual release date for the mobile port was August 31, 2022.

Pocket Gamer deemed Project Winter Mobile as "too demanding" for most mobile devices, stating "You'll need a fully charged recent model phone and highly stable internet connection to play this game with some smoothness. If you're not equipped to do this on the go, you may be better off playing it through a mobile emulator on your PC".

On April 19, 2023, the developers announced in a Facebook post that Project Winter Mobile would be shut down on May 25, 2023.

== Reception ==
Project Winter

Aggregate score
Aggregator	Score			
Aggregator	NS	PC	PS4	Xbox One
Metacritic	50/100	tbd	tbd	75/100

Project Winter has received "generally favorable" reviews on Metacritic. Due to its social deduction-based nature, many reviews nearing the console release in 2021 compared it to the game Among Us.

Screen Rant rated the game at 3.5/5 stars, stating "While Project Winter has many fun features, [...] there is a lot going on during a round, and at times, the balancing act of wilderness survival, social deduction, puzzle solving and team communication can roll into an overwhelming blur." Other reviewers have praised the game's "unique" concept and "impressive depth", but were also critical of problems within the community. Nintendo Life commented, "we were often met with the kind of racist and sexist troll behaviour that should have been left behind in the 2000s, which is, admittedly, not Project Winter's fault, but it did colour our experience."

GamePro called the game a "more complex Among Us for survival fans".
