= Mortal Kombat II =

1993 video game

- North American cover art
- Developer: Midway (Note: Amiga, Game Boy, Game Gear, Genesis, Master System, and MS-DOS versions developed by Probe Software; SNES version developed by Sculptured Software; 32X, PlayStation, and Saturn versions developed by Probe Entertainment.)
- Publishers: Midway; Consoles; Acclaim Entertainment
- Producers: MS-DOS; Robert Leingang; Robert O'Farrell; Billy Pidgeon
- Designers: Ed Boon; John Tobias
- Programmers: MS-DOS; Ed Boon; Brian O'Shaughnessy
- Artist: John Tobias: MS-DOS Tony Goskie John Vogel Terry Ford
- Composer: Dan Forden
- Series: Mortal Kombat
- Platform: Arcade: Game Boy, Game Gear, Genesis/Mega Drive, Super NES, Master System, Amiga, 32X, MS-DOS, Sega Saturn, PlayStation
- Release: November 1993: Arcade; NA: November 1993 Game Boy, Game Gear, Genesis/Mega Drive, Super NES; NA/EU: September 9, 1994 Master System; PAL: November 1994 Amiga; NA/EU: 1994 32X; NA/PAL: March 1995 MS-DOS; NA: May 16, 1995; EU: 1995 Saturn; EU: February 2, 1996; NA: March 28, 1996 PlayStation; JP: August 2, 1996
- Genre: Fighting
- Modes: Single-player, multiplayer
- Arcade system: Midway T Unit

Mortal Kombat II is a 1993 fighting game developed and published by Midway for arcades. It was later ported to multiple home systems, including MS-DOS, Amiga, Game Boy, Game Gear, Sega Genesis, 32X, Sega Saturn, Super NES, and PlayStation, by Probe Software (later renamed to Probe Entertainment for some ports of the game) and Sculptured Software, and published by Acclaim Entertainment.

Mortal Kombat II is the second main installment in the Mortal Kombat franchise, and a sequel to 1992's Mortal Kombat. It improves the gameplay and expands the mythos of its predecessor while introducing more varied finishing moves (including several Fatalities per character and new finishers, such as Babality and Friendship) and several new characters such as Kitana, Mileena, Kung Lao, the hidden character Noob Saibot, and the series' recurring villain, Shao Kahn. The game's plot continues from the first game, featuring the next Mortal Kombat tournament set in the otherdimensional realm of Outworld, with the Outworld and Earthrealm representatives fighting each other on their way to challenge Shao Kahn.

Mortal Kombat II was released to enormous commercial success and critical acclaim, winning several awards and inspiring numerous clones. However, it was also involved in controversy due to the series' continuous depiction of graphic violence. In the years since its release, Mortal Kombat II has been cited as one of the best games in the series, as well as one of the greatest video games ever made. It was succeeded in 1995 by the direct sequel Mortal Kombat 3, and in 2005 by the spin-off Mortal Kombat: Shaolin Monks, which takes place during the events of Mortal Kombat II.

== Gameplay ==
A fight between Liu Kang and Reptile

The gameplay system of Mortal Kombat II is an improved version of that from the original Mortal Kombat. There are several changes in standard moves: a crouching punch was added, low and high kicks have greater differentiation (be they crouching or standing up), roundhouse kicks are made more powerful (knocking an opponent across the screen, like the game's uppercut), and it is easier to perform combos due to reduced recovery times for attacks. Returning characters also gained new special moves, including some to be used in mid-air, and the game plays almost twice as fast as the original.

As with its predecessor, matches are divided into rounds, and the first player to win two rounds by fully depleting their opponent's life bar is the winner. At this point, the losing character will become dazed and the winner is given the opportunity of using a finishing move. Mortal Kombat II lacks the "Test Your Might" bonus games and point system from the first game, in favor of a consecutive win tally where wins are represented by icons.

The game marked the introduction of multiple Fatalities (special moves allowing the victorious character to execute their opponent at the end of a match) as well as additional, non-lethal finishing moves to the franchise: Babalities (turning the opponent into a crying baby), Friendships (a non-malicious interaction, such as dancing or giving a gift to the defeated opponent) and additional stage-specific Fatalities (the victor uppercutting their opponent into an abyss below, spikes in the ceiling, or a pool of acid in the background). Finishing moves cannot be performed either by or against the boss or secret characters. (Note: The arcade version also contains a hidden game of Pong.)

== Plot ==
Following his failure to defeat Liu Kang in the previous Mortal Kombat tournament, the evil Shang Tsung begs his master Shao Kahn, supreme ruler of Outworld and the surrounding kingdoms, to spare his life. He tells Shao Kahn that if they hold the next Mortal Kombat Tournament in Outworld, the Earthrealm warriors must travel away from home to attend. Kahn agrees to this plan, and restores Shang Tsung's youth and martial arts prowess. He then extends the invitation to the thunder god and Earthrealm's protector, Raiden, who gathers his warriors and takes them into Outworld. The new tournament is much more dangerous, as Shao Kahn has the home field advantage.

According to the Mortal Kombat series' canon, Liu Kang won this tournament as well, defeating Shao Kahn and his bodyguard Kintaro. The game's story mode can be also finished using any other playable character, resulting in a variety of non-canonical endings for each of them. This game also establishes that the original Sub-Zero Bi-Han was killed by Scorpion in the first game, and Bi-Han's younger brother Kuai Liang took the identity of the new Sub-Zero.

== Characters ==
The character selection screen in Mortal Kombat II, showing the game's playable character roster. From the upper left: Liu Kang, Kung Lao, Johnny Cage, Reptile, Sub-Zero, Shang Tsung, Kitana, Jax, Mileena, Baraka, Scorpion, Raiden

The game includes 12 playable characters.

New characters

- Baraka (played by Richard Divizio), a mutant warlord of Outworld's Nomad race, responsible for the assault on the Shaolin Monastery on the orders of Shao Kahn.
- Jax (played by John Parrish): U.S. Special Forces officer who enters the tournament to rescue his partner Sonya Blade from Outworld.
- Kitana (played by Katalin Zamiar), a female ninja who works as a personal assassin in the service of Shao Kahn. She has been suspected of secretly aiding the Earthrealm warriors.
- Kung Lao (played by Anthony Marquez), Shaolin monk and close friend of Liu Kang, a descendant of the Great Kung Lao (who was defeated by Goro and Shang Tsung 500 years before the events of MK). He seeks to avenge his ancestor and the destruction of the Shaolin temple.
- Mileena (played by Katalin Zamiar), twin sister to Kitana who also serves as an assassin for Kahn. Her mission during the tournament is to ensure the loyalty of her sister, but she also has plans of her own.

Returning characters

- Johnny Cage (played by Daniel Pesina), Hollywood actor who joins Liu Kang in his journey to Outworld.
- Liu Kang (played by Ho Sung Pak), Shaolin monk who is the reigning champion of Mortal Kombat. He travels to Outworld to seek vengeance for the death of his Shaolin monastery brothers.
- Raiden (played by Carlos Pesina), thunder god who returns to Mortal Kombat to stop Kahn's evil plans of taking Earthrealm for his own (spelled "Rayden" in the DOS and console ports).
- Reptile (played by Daniel Pesina), Shang Tsung's personal bodyguard. (Note: Previously a palette swap of Sub-Zero with Scorpion and Sub-Zero's moves, Reptile has been made into a distinct character and given his own moves.)
- Scorpion (played by Daniel Pesina), a hellspawned spectre who returns to the tournament to once again assassinate Sub-Zero.
- Shang Tsung (played by Philip Ahn, M.D.) An evil sorcerer who convinced Kahn to spare his life after losing the last tournament, with a new plan to appease his master, who in turn restores Tsung's youth. He is playable in this installment, but also serves as a sub-boss of the game where he appears before Kintaro in the single-player mode. As in the first game, he is able to morph into any of the playable characters, retaining their moves (in some versions only the character against whom he is currently fighting).
- Sub-Zero (played by Daniel Pesina), a male ninja who possesses cryokinesis. Though apparently killed in the first tournament, he mysteriously returns, traveling into Outworld to again attempt to assassinate Shang Tsung.

Boss characters

- Kintaro (stop motion), Shao Kahn's bodyguard, sent by his race to avenge Goro's defeat. He is the game's penultimate boss.
- Shao Kahn (played by Brian Glynn, voiced by Steve Ritchie), the evil Emperor of Outworld, who wishes to conquer Earthrealm by any means. He is the tournament host and the game's final boss.

The game also features three hidden opponents for unlockable fights, each of whom is introduced as a "lost warrior" from the first MK game, with the stage being Goro's Lair which is carried over from the preceding Mortal Kombat. One of them is Jade (played by Katalin Zamiar), a female ninja who is a green palette swap of Kitana (some versions also feature Jade with a darker complexion), sharing Kitana's abilities but has additional immunity to projectiles. The other two are Noob Saibot, a dark silhouetted ninja, and Smoke, a male ninja clothed in gray who emits smoke from his body; both of whom are palette swaps of Scorpion (played by Daniel Pesina) and have Scorpion's moves but having extreme speed.

Sonya and Kano are the only playable characters from the first Mortal Kombat who were not implemented as fighters, as they only appear in the background of the Kahn's Arena stage being chained as his prisoners. The reason for this was due to the storage limitations of arcade hardware at the time. When Midway employees ran audits on several Mortal Kombat arcade cabinets in the Chicago area, they found that Kano and Sonya were the least chosen characters. Hence, they were reduced to background sprites in order to make room for new characters; however they would return as playable characters in future installments.

== Development ==
When we finished Mortal Kombat I, Acclaim did the home version, and they sold six million copies or something crazy like that. We had already started talking about doing a Star Wars game, and then our general manager at the time came to us one day and said, 'What do you mean a Star Wars game? You can't do a Star Wars game. You've got to do another Mortal Kombat game.' The notion of sequels wasn't even something that we had entertained. It was just like, 'Oh, you do this game and then you move onto the next game.' Looking back now, it's really silly that we wouldn't have entertained that idea.

— Ed Boon

MKII's story influences came from the same places as the first game. One influence came from the first two Star Wars films, where you knew that there was an emperor ruling the universe, but knew nothing else about him. It created a desire in the viewer to want to know more. I think we had something very similar with Shang Tsung and Shao Kahn and for me that came from that feeling I had as a kid when I learned more about what made the Star Wars universe tick in Empire Strikes Back. I wanted MK fans to have that same feeling.

— John Tobias

According to lead programmer Ed Boon, Mortal Kombat II was "intended to look different than the original MK" and "had everything we wanted to put into MK but did not have time for." In 2012, Boon named creating the game among his best Mortal Kombat memories, recalling: "When we did Mortal Kombat II, we got new equipment and all that stuff, but it was funny because when we started working on Mortal Kombat II, the mania, the hysteria of the home versions of Mortal Kombat I was literally all around us. We were so busy working on the next one, going from seven characters to 12 and two Fatalities per character and all these other things that that consumed every second." Both the theme and art style of MKII were slightly darker than those of its predecessor, although a more vibrant color palette was employed and the new game had a much richer color depth than the previous game. A new feature was the use of multiple layers of parallax scrolling in the arcade version. The game was made to be less serious with the addition of humorous alternative finishing moves. Some of the considered Fatalities were rejected as being too extreme at the time.

Care was taken during the programming process to give the game a "good feel", with Boon simulating elements such as gravity into the game's design. Lead designer and artist John Tobias noted that the first game's reliance on juggling the opponent in the air with successive hits was an accident, and had been tightened in Mortal Kombat II. Boon said that the reason to not completely remove it in favor of a different system of chaining attacks together was to set the game apart from the competing titles such as Street Fighter, and allow for players to devise their own combinations of attacks. A double jump ability was implemented but later removed. At one point, a bonus stage was planned to feature "a bunch of ninjas jumping all over the place and you would swing at them, just like you're in the middle of a fight in a kung fu movie." All of the music was composed, performed, recorded and mixed by Dan Forden, the series' sound designer and composer, using the Williams DCS sound system.

As with the first game, Acclaim Entertainment published the home conversions. San Francisco Chronicle claimed in 1994 that Acclaim had spent $50 million on developing, manufacturing and marketing the game.

=== Character animations ===
To create the character animations for the game, actors were placed in front of a gray background and performed the motions, which were recorded on videotape using a broadcast-quality, $20,000 Sony camera instead of the standard Hi8 camera used for the original Mortal Kombat. The video capture footage was then processed into a computer, and the background was removed from selected frames to create sprites. Towards the end of the game's development, they opted to instead use a blue screen technique and processed the footage directly into the computer for a similar, simpler process. The actors were lightly sprayed with water to give them a sweaty, glistening appearance, while post-editing was done on the sprites afterward to highlight flesh tones and improve the visibility of muscles, which Tobias felt set the series apart from similar games using digitized graphics. Animations of Shang Tsung morphing into other characters were created by Midway's John Vogel using a computer, while hand-drawn animations were used for other parts of the game, such as the Fatalities. For Goro and Kintaro, clay sculptures were created by Tobias' friend Curt Chiarelli and then turned into 12-inch latex miniatures that were used for stop motion filming. Because of technical restrictions, the actors' costumes had to be simple and no acrobatic moves such as backflips could have been recorded; the most difficult moves to perform were some of the jumping kicks.

Several characters (namely Jade, Kitana, Mileena, Noob Saibot, Reptile, Scorpion, Smoke, and Sub-Zero) were created using the first game's palette swap technique on just two base models. The game was noted for its "strong female presence", as it was featured more than one female character, which was uncommon in the fighting genre at the time. Due to memory limitations and the development team's desire to introduce more new characters, Sonya Blade and Kano, two fighters from the original Mortal Kombat whom Boon cited as the least-picked characters in the game, were excluded, substituted by two palette swaps: Mileena and Reptile. In place of Sonya, two new playable female characters, Kitana and Mileena, were introduced so the game might better compete against Capcom's Street Fighter II: The World Warrior featuring Chun-Li. (Note: 1993's Super Street Fighter II: The New Challengers added Cammy to the roster.) Another planned female fighter, based on the real-life kickboxer Kathy Long whom Tobias admired, was omitted due to time constraints. A male bonus character played by Kyu Hwang was also cut from the game.

== Release ==
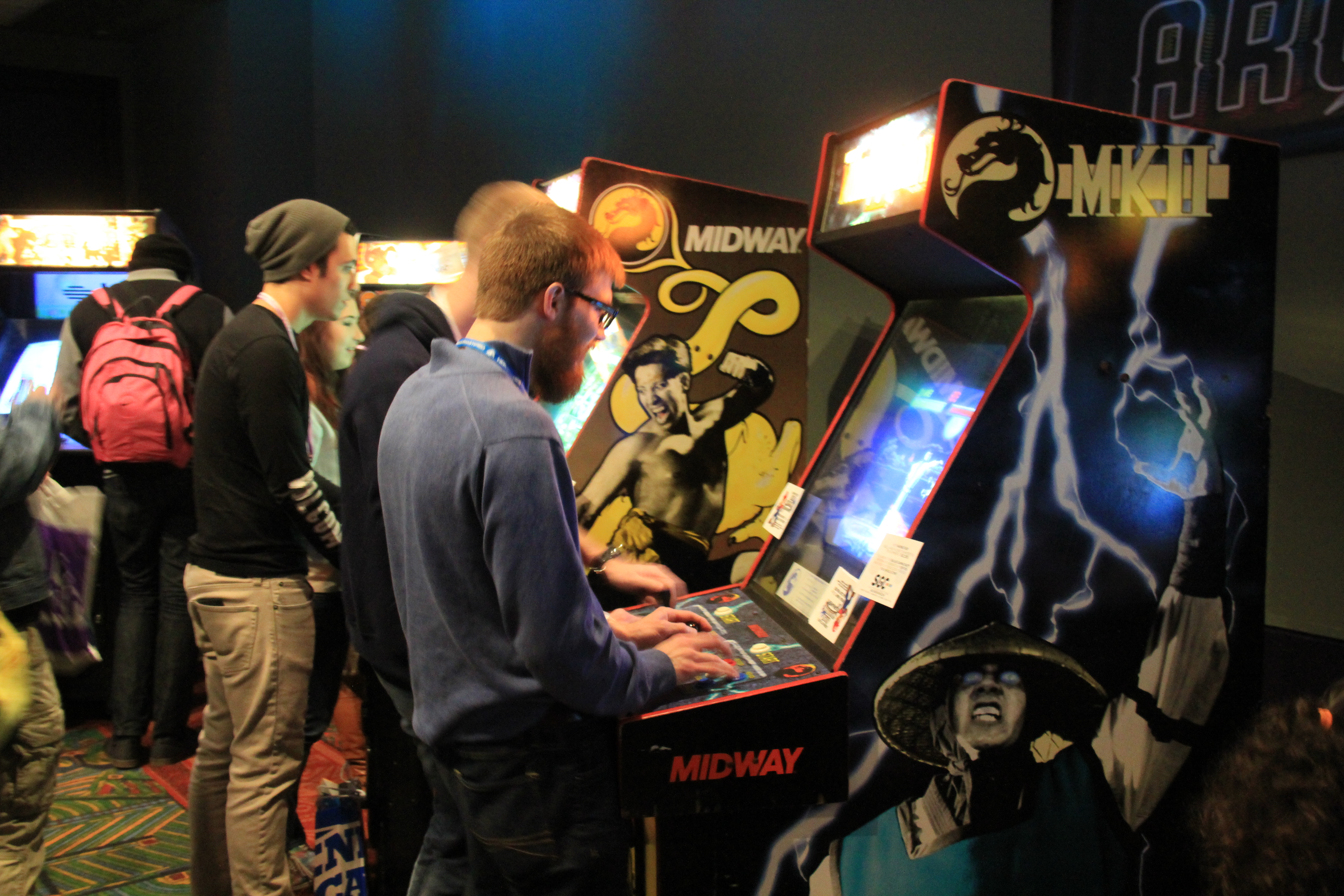
An original Mortal Kombat II arcade cabinet (with artwork of the character Raiden on the side panels) at PAX South 2015

The first version of MKII, revision 1.4, "was effectively a public beta test", featuring few Fatalities and many software bugs; it also lacked the endings for the characters. It took three subsequent revisions to have the moves and finishing moves finalized and all the bugs corrected, also adding additional content, as development had still been in progress for all that time. The final version was revision 3.1, released in January 1994.

=== Marketing and merchandise ===
In conjunction with the release of the arcade game, Mortal Kombat II Collector's Edition, an official comic book written and illustrated by Tobias, was released through mail order, describing the backstory of the game in greater detail. Acclaim Entertainment stated that it "had started Mortal Kombat II with a $10 million global marketing campaign" for the home versions. A part of this sum was used to film and air the live-action TV commercial created by David Anderson and Bob Keen. The video featured Scorpion, Sub-Zero, Reptile (with a notably more reptilian appearance), Kitana, Baraka and Shao Kahn, who were played by the same actors as in the game. The game's promotional campaign's tagline was "Nothing... Nothing can prepare you." In 2008, Eurogamer called Mortal Kombat II "a marketing triumph".

Malibu Comics published a series of Mortal Kombat comic books featuring the characters from both MKII and the original game. Mortal Kombat II: Music from the Arcade Game Soundtrack, an album featuring music from Mortal Kombat II and Mortal Kombat, composed by Dan Forden, could originally only be purchased by ordering it through a limited CD offer, which was posted on the arcade version of the game's attract mode. Other merchandise for the game included the periodical official fanzine Mortal Kombat II Kollector's Magazine published by Midway and Sendai, a series of collectible stickers for an album by Panini Group, two different series of action figures (released in Argentina in 1995 and in the US in 1999, respectively), and collectible card game Mortal Kombat Kard Game, which was marketed as "Mortal Kombat II trading cards".

=== Home releases ===
Since 1994, multiple official ports and emulated versions of Mortal Kombat II have been released for a wide variety of home systems, including the 8-bit (Game Boy, Game Gear, and Master System), 16-bit (Super Nintendo Entertainment System (SNES) and Sega Genesis/Mega Drive) and 32-bit (32X, PlayStation, and Sega Saturn) consoles, Amiga and MS-DOS computers, and the PlayStation Network (PSN). The Game Boy, Game Gear, SNES, and Genesis versions were released simultaneously on September 9, 1994, a date dubbed "Mortal Friday". The PlayStation version was released only in Japan, retitled Mortal Kombat II: Kyuukyoku Shinken (モータルコンバットII 究極神拳, Mōtaru Konbatto Tsū Kyūkyoku Shinken; "Mortal Kombat II: Ultimate Godly Fist"); this subtitle was also used for the Japanese release of the 32X port.

- The Genesis/Mega Drive port, developed by Probe Software, retains all of the blood and Fatalities without a special code having to be entered, unlike the original Mortal Kombat for the system. It contains several exclusive Easter eggs (Note: One of them is "Fergality", performed by selecting Raiden and fighting on the Armory stage; when successfully executed, the opponent transforms into a smoking character with an oversized head of Probe Software's Fergus McGovern.) and features some different character animations for victory poses and a support for the motion controller device Sega Activator.
- The SNES version was developed by Sculptured Software. Due to poor sales of the censored SNES version of the first game, Nintendo decided to allow depictions of blood and Fatalities this time around. Because the industry-wide rating system was not expected to be in effect until November 1994 at the earliest, this version had no formal rating; instead, a warning label was put on the game's box in order to inform prospective buyers about the game's mature content. The Japanese version, however, is censored to a degree, with green blood for all fighters, and the screen colors turning black-and-white for all character-specific lethal Fatalities. John Tobias favored the SNES version over the Genesis version, stating: "I would go so far as to say that the Super NES version is one of the best arcade-to-home conversions I've seen."
- The Game Boy port, also developed by Probe Software, plays similarly to the Game Boy version of the original game, but with characters moving much smoother and faster. It only contains eight of the 12 playable fighters from the arcade game (lacking Baraka, Johnny Cage, Kung Lao and Raiden); Kintaro and Noob Saibot were also removed from the game, although Jade is included as a hidden fighter. Only three of ten arenas are retained from the arcade version: the Kombat Tomb, the Pit II and Goro's Lair. The Kombat Tomb contains the port's only Stage Fatality and Goro's Lair is much simpler in this version (consisting of a brick wall with no openings or glowing eyes). Blood is completely removed and each playable character retains only one of their Fatalities plus the Babality.
- The Game Gear and Master System ports, also developed by Probe Software, are similar to the Game Boy port, but are in color instead of in monochrome. Both versions are almost identical except for the reduced size of the Game Gear screen, featuring the same fighters and arenas as the Game Boy port, but with the addition of Kintaro. The arena where players fight Jade and Smoke is exclusive to each version. Unlike the Game Boy version, blood is present, but was drastically reduced in quantity when compared to other ports. Because of the systems' limited graphical resources, some of the Fatalities in the game were altered to completely destroy the opponent's body, leaving generic gibs of bones and limbs, while others were also simplified to use common animations.
- The 32X version, also developed by Probe Software, is practically equal to the SNES version, maintaining the complete voice-over and all the little graphics details that were toned down in the Genesis version.

The game was also featured in several compilation releases, including Midway Arcade Treasures 2 for the GameCube, PlayStation 2, and Xbox, Mortal Kombat: Shaolin Monks for the PlayStation 2 and Xbox as a hidden and unlockable Easter egg, Midway Arcade Treasures: Extended Play for the PlayStation Portable, and Mortal Kombat Arcade Kollection for the Microsoft Windows, PlayStation 3 and Xbox 360. Another compilation release for the Nintendo DS was canceled. Arcade1Up released a home arcade cabinet compilation that included the game, as well as the original Mortal Kombat and Ultimate Mortal Kombat 3.

== Reception ==
Reception

Aggregate scores
Aggregator	Score
GameRankings	SMD: 86% SNES: 86%
Metacritic	PS3: 72/100

Review scores
Publication	Score
Computer and Video Games	ARC: 93% SMD: 97% SNES: 96% AMI: 96% 32X: 93% GB: 90% SGG: 88%
Electronic Gaming Monthly	SNES: 9/10, 8/10, 8/10, 8/10; SMD: 8/10, 7/10, 7/10, 7/10; SGG: 7/10; GB: 6/10; SSAT: 5.75/10
Famitsu	SNES: 8/10, 7/10, 7/10, 6/10; SMD: 8/10, 8/10, 7/10, 6/10; SGG: 7/10, 5/10, 6/10, 4/10; GB: 5/10, 4/10, 5/10, 4/10; PS: 6/10, 5/10, 5/10, 3/10
Game Informer	SSAT: 7/10
GamePro	SNES: 20/20; SMD: 17.5/20; SGG: 16.5/20; GB: 15/20
GamesMaster	SMD: 94%
GameSpot	PS3: 7.9/10
IGN	32X: 7.8/10; PS3: 7.3/10
Next Generation	SNES: 5/5; PC: 4/5; 32X/SSAT: 3/5
Amiga Format	AMI: 90%
CU Amiga	AMI: 95%
Mean Machines Sega	32X: 92% SMS: 80%
Sega Saturn Magazine	SSAT (Pre-release): 93% 2/5
VG&CE	SNES: 10/10; 32X: 9/10; GB: 8/10; SMD: 7/10; SGG: 7/10

=== Sales ===
Mortal Kombat II proved to be an enormous commercial success and even a cultural phenomenon. WMS Industries, then owner of Midway, reported that its 1993 sales in the quarter ending December 31 rose from $86 million to $101 million, and said much of its revenue gain was related to the sale of the arcade version of MKII. The game went on to become America's highest-grossing arcade game of 1994, according to the Amusement & Music Operators Association (AMOA). By 1996, the number of arcade machines sold approached 25,000 units; at that time, arcade games that sold 5,000 units were considered strong titles (Midway printed special T-shirts to celebrate 300 machines being manufactured in one day), and an arcade cabinet cost $3,000–4,000. The arcade version went on to sell 27,000 units, and grossed $600 million as of 2002. MKII was considered an arcade game of the year, taking over from the original Mortal Kombat.

On the day of the release of Genesis, Game Gear, SNES and Game Boy versions, dubbed "Mortal Friday" (September 9, 1994, celebrated annually by the fan community on the second Friday of September), an unprecedented number of more than 2.5 million copies were shipped to be distributed, with the best opening week sales in video game history at that point. Acclaim analysts expected that the number of copies sold would reach at least 2.5 million within the first few weeks of release (at an average retail price of $60) and the sales to top $150 million by the end of the year.

In the first week of its console release, the game made sales to $50 million, which Acclaim Entertainment said was "The largest introduction of a video game in history". Distribution of over 2.5 million copies around 15,000 stores required 65 trucks and 11 jumbo jets. First-week sales of over $50 million in the United States surpassed the opening box office results of that season's Hollywood film blockbusters, such as Forrest Gump, True Lies, The Mask, and The Lion King. Approximately 2.5 million units were shipped to stores within a month. Mortal Kombat II became the world's best-selling video game until it was eclipsed by Donkey Kong Country, released in November 1994. In the United States, it was the top-selling Genesis, SNES, and Game Gear title of September 1994, and the top game for the latter console the following month. The Genesis version went on to sell 1.78 million copies in the United States, along with an additional 1.51 million copies for the SNES in that same region. In the United Kingdom, it was the top-selling game in September 1994, including for the Mega Drive, SNES, Master System, Game Gear and Game Boy; it remained the top-selling game for the Master System, Game Gear, and Game Boy in October, and for the Game Gear in November.

By 2002, estimated gross sales of the home versions of Mortal Kombat II exceeded $400 million. The PSN version, released in 2007, continued to occupy the service's top ten monthly sales chart nearly three years later in February 2010.

=== Reviews ===
Initial critical reception towards Mortal Kombat II was overwhelmingly positive, with Sega Visions describing the way in which the sequel was directed as "sheer brilliance", and Nintendo Power calling it "the hottest fighter ever". Tony Brusgul of The Daily Gazette opined that the "incredible" hype surrounding the game was "well deserved", describing it as "a perfect blend of great graphics, action and violence". In his review of the arcade release, Rik Skews of Computer + Video Games (C+VG) said that "the only true rival to Street [F]ighter II" returned "in a sequel that bites off the head of the original."

Regarding the Genesis version, Mark Patterson of C+VG wrote that "Probe has done an incredible job with this conversion. Everything is here, and I mean everything." Sushi-X of Electronic Gaming Monthly (EGM) called the Genesis version "a great translation considering its limitations," saying that its graphics and sounds are not as good as those of the SNES version. A reviewer for The Detroit News was "very disappointed" with the Genesis port and recommended the SNES version instead.

The four reviewers of EGM hailed the SNES version as a "near-perfect" translation of the arcade game. A reviewer for The Baltimore Sun called the SNES version "the best game I've ever played - a true translation," and Patterson noted it was the bloodiest game Nintendo has yet allowed to be released. C+VG declared it "the most perfect coin-op conversion ever". Next Generation said of the SNES version that "with full creative license, Acclaim has produced possibly the best arcade conversion ever."

Regarding the game's handheld ports, Patterson stated of the Game Boy version that "no Game Boy owner should go without this," and called the Game Gear version "still the best handheld beat-'em up" on the market, despite said version lacking much canonical content. EGM reviewers concurred that the Game Gear version "has eye-popping graphics, and great control - so much so that you won't believe this is a portable", but were less enthusiastic about the Game Boy version. Though they commented that it is better than most fighting games for the system, two of their four reviewers said that it was not worth getting with the game available on much more powerful platforms.

Critical reception of the Amiga version was also mostly favorable, with Ed Lawrence of CU Amiga declaring that "every person who own an Amiga has to own Mortal Kombat 2. In terms of revitalising the Amiga market, this is far more important than any Commodore buy-out could ever be." In a rare dissenting opinion, Jonathan Nash of Amiga Power dismissed Mortal Kombat II as "a clearly nonsensical title", recommending to "buy Shadow Fighter instead". The later PC version was also well-received, with Next Generation stating that "if you like fighting games, this is the best that's available."

Reviewing the 32X version, IGN's Levi Buchanan said that "if you do not have a SNES, this is the home version of MKII to get." In contrast, GamePro remarked that the 32X version offered too little improvement over the Genesis version, even failing to correct the control shortcomings, and was technically poor given the add-on's capabilities. In a review of the 32X version, Next Generation opined that "MKII is a great game, but it's a serious case of 'been there, done that!'" Brazilian magazine Ação Games gave the 32X version 5 out of 5 on all six categories.

Reviewing the Saturn version, EGM said that the graphics are identical to the arcade version but there are missing sound effects and "unbearable" slowdown when first performing a special move. They rated it the best home version of the game to date, but said that with Mortal Kombat II having considerably aged by this point, any port needed to be near arcade perfect to stand out. Next Generation said that the Saturn version was arcade perfect, but that the Mortal Kombat series as a whole was grossly overrated and lacked any gameplay innovations to make it stand out from other fighting games. They summarized that "if you are a fan of the game (and you know who you are), then the Saturn version is everything you can hope for - an arcade-perfect translation - and yet, there is nothing outside of a flashy presentation and a little gore to recommend this game over a million others just like it." Lawrence Neves (writing under the pseudonym "Scary Larry") of GamePro agreed that the Saturn port "duplicates the arcade version perfectly", but argued that the slowdown and load times make the game frustrating to play. He concluded that the conversion would make a decent holdover until Ultimate Mortal Kombat 3 was released for Saturn, but fails to measure up to Mortal Kombat 3 on the PlayStation. Sega Saturn Magazine was extremely disappointed with the final version of the Saturn port, calling it "much worse than any of the versions seen on the cartridge format", as opposed to the vastly superior pre-release version they had reviewed five months earlier.

=== Awards ===
Mortal Kombat II received numerous annual awards from gaming publications. Game Players gave it the titles of "Best Genesis Fighting Game", "Best SNES Fighting Game" and "Best Overall SNES Game" of 1994. The staff of Nintendo Power ranked MKII as the second (SNES) and fifth (Game Boy) "Top Game" of 1994, while the magazine's readers voted it to receive the 1995's Nintendo Power Awards for "Best Tournament Fighter (all Nintendo platforms)" and "Best Play Control (Game Boy)", with the game having been nominated by the staff also in the categories "Worst Villain" (positively, an equivalent of "Best Hero") and "Best Overall (all Nintendo platforms)". VideoGames named MKII the "Best Fighting Game" of 1994, also awarding it second place in the categories "Best Super NES Game" and "Best Arcade-to-Home Translation". Other awards included "The Best of the Show (Super NES)" for the SCES '94 from GamePro and "Bloodiest Game of 1994" from EGM. In 2017, Gamesradar listed the game 29th on its list of the "Best Sega Genesis/Mega Drive games of all time".

=== Controversies ===
As in the case of the first Mortal Kombat game, the content of Mortal Kombat II became the subject of a great deal of controversy regarding violent video games. Nancian Cherry of Toledo Blade wrote that both games had "an army of critics too: people upset by the bone-crunching, blood-spurting, limb-ripping violence depicted on the small screen." According to IGN, "Mortal Kombat II wore its notoriety as a badge of honor, boasting about it in promotional materials, and even parodying it in-game." The game was banned in Germany, where it was put in the index by the Federal Department for Media Harmful to Young Persons (BPjM), and all versions of the game except for the Game Boy version were subjected to being confiscated from the German market for violating the German Penal Code by showing excessive violence and cruel acts against representations of human beings. Due to regional censorship, the game was also released with green-colored blood and black-and-white fatality sequences in Japan; it was at that time a unique occurrence of a western game being censored in Japan rather than the inverse. Years later, Boon recalled: "I've always had the position that the rating system was a good idea and should be put in place. Once Mortal Kombat II came out, there was a rating system in place. We were an M-rated game, and everybody knew the content that was in there, so it became almost a non-issue." Tobias agreed, saying that they "were content with the M for mature on our packaging."

There were also some other controversies unrelated to the game's graphic content. In 1994, Guy Aoki, president of Media Action Network for Asian Americans (MANAA), criticized the game for allegedly perpetuating existing stereotypes of Asians as martial arts experts with the game's portrayal of several of its characters. Allyne Mills, a publicist at Acclaim, responded to this by stating: "This is a fantasy game, with all different characters. This is a martial arts game which comes from Asia. [sic] The game was not created to foster stereotypes." Critical studies professor Marsha Kinder accused the game of "a misogynist aspect to the combat", alleging that "in MKII, some of the most violent possibilities are against women. Also, their fatality moves are highly eroticised."

Mortal Kombat actors Daniel Pesina, Philip Ahn, Katalin Zamiar and Elizabeth Malecki unsuccessfully filed two lawsuits in 1996 and 1997 against Midway, Williams, Nintendo of America, Sega of America, and Acclaim Entertainment for the unauthorized misuse of their likenesses and to seek royalties from sales of the games' home ports. Pesina, who sought $10 million in the suits for his roles in the first two MK games, had appeared in costume as Johnny Cage in a 1994 print advertisement for the fighting game BloodStorm.

=== Retrospective ===
Arguably the best Western fighting game to date, and certainly the title that defined Mortal Kombat as a brand, this game launched a thousand imitators en route to becoming one of the most famous -- and infamous -- video games ever made. Its technical and artistic mastery is only matched by its gushing gore.

— GamePro in 2007

Over the following years, multiple publications acclaimed Mortal Kombat II as one of the best video games ever. It was named the 97th top game of all time by the staff of Game Informer in 2001, the 38th most important video game of all time by the staff of GamePro in 2007, and the 32nd best video game of all time by The Boston Phoenix in 2010. Featuring it in their 2003 video game hall of fame series, the staff of GameSpot wrote: "Mortal Kombat II was so much better, as a sequel, than it had to be that it absolutely deserves a place in the pantheon of all-time classics."

Many publications also listed Mortal Kombat II among the best video games of its genre or era. It was named the third best fighting game by the staff of GamePro and the ninth best fighting game of all time by Rich Knight of Cinema Blend in 2008, the third top fighting game of all time by Marissa Meli of UGO and the second best 2D fighting game ever made by Robert Workman of GamePlayBook in 2010, and the third best fighting game of all time by Peter Rubin of Complex in 2011. It was also named the 53rd best game on any Nintendo platform by the staff of Nintendo Power in 1997, featured among the 100 best games of the 20th century by Jakub Kralka of Benchmark in 2009, and the tenth best 16-bit game ever by McKinley Noble of PC World that same year.

The game also received accolades for its various conversions. Mortal Kombat II was included among the ten best arcade games by Wirtualna Polska, and named the fifth top arcade game by the staff of GameTrailers in 2009, the 31st top arcade game of all time by the staff of GameSpy in 2011, and the sixth best arcade game of the 1990s by Complex in 2013. Regarding the 16-bit console versions, MKII was named the fourth best ever Genesis game by Complex and the 19th best Genesis game by GamesRadar, as well as the 12th best ever SNES game by Rich Knight of Complex and the 25th top game for the SNES by Richard George of IGN; in 1995, SNES magazine Super Play also named it the best sequel on the platform. In Poland, where the Amiga was the most popular gaming platform of the early 1990s, MKII was named the ninth best ever Amiga game by Michał Wierzbicki of CHIP and the 22nd best Amiga game by PSX Extreme editor-in-chief Przemysław Ścierski. In 1995, Total! listed the game at number four on its list of the "Top 100 SNES Games". In 1996, GamesMaster rated the game 35th on their list of the "Top 100 Games of All Time".

Most hard-core fans agree that Mortal Kombat II is the best in the entire series. Midway improved on every single aspect and ... inspired a horde of also-rans.

— GameSpot in 2002

GamesRadar called it "the point when the series became great". In 2007, GamesRadar included four elements of this game - Dan Forden's "Toasty!" soundbite during an uppercut (also ranked as the 11th funniest moment in video games by Rich Knight of Complex in 2012), Friendship and Babality finishing moves, and the ceiling spikes Stage Fatality - among the ten greatest things about Mortal Kombat. Reviewing the PlayStation 3 release in 2007, IGN's Jeff Haynes stated that "Mortal Kombat II still manages to stand up almost 15 years later as one of the best arcade fighters around." As late as 2009, many fans still considered MKII to be the best title in the series. According to a 2011 article by Mike Harradence of PlayStation Universe, the "bigger, bolder and bloodier" game remains "a firm fan favourite among MK aficionados". That year, IGN's Richard George wrote that "Mortal Kombat II is considered by many to be the pinnacle of the series" and called it "still one of the most fun 16-bit fighters to play". In 2013, Rich Knight and Hanuman Welch of Complex wrote that "Mortal Kombat II took everything we loved about the original and magnified it by about a million. ... We still love this game." That same year, Knight and Gus Turner from the same magazine also ranked it as the sixth best 2D fighting game of all time, stating: "Truth be told, the latest MK has nothing on this one. Nothing. A step up from the original in every way, MK II was, and still is, a solid, violent game that's an essential title to grab for any serious fan of fighting games." In 2014, Kevin Wong of Complex wrote, "Today, we remember Mortal Kombat II for its anarchic spirit—the game was endlessly intriguing and weird, and it had an uneasy atmosphere—anything could happen at any given moment. Critics derided Mortal Kombat as meaningless shock value, but its sequel proved those naysayers wrong. Mortal Kombat II was a Flawless Victory—irreverent, hilarious, and horrific in equal measures."

== Legacy ==
On December 26, 2022, the source code for the game, which included cut content, was uploaded online to GitHub. In response, on January 6, 2023, Warner Bros. Discovery sent a DMCA takedown notice to GitHub, and public access to the repository was disabled as a result. The leaker then created a new repository titled "not-mk2", which contained the "Controversies" section of the NetherRealm Studios article on Wikipedia.

=== Rumored content ===
While many games have been subject to urban legends about secret features and unlockable content, such myths were particularly rampant among the dedicated fan community of Mortal Kombat in regards to Mortal Kombat II. According to GameSpy, "the [arcade gaming] community was abuzz about myriad secrets both true and false." The game's creators did little to dispel those rumors that included supposed "Nudality" or "Sexuality" finishing moves for Kitana and Mileena, Shang Tsung's ability to transform into Kano and Goro, a chance to fight Sonya after defeating Jade in a specific way, and "Hornbuckle" being featured as an additional secret character.

Some of them were eventually implemented in subsequent MK games. Among these rumors to be adapted later were the Animalities (used in Mortal Kombat 3 and its updates) and an ability to throw an opponent into the mouth of a tree in the Living Forest stage (first used in Mortal Kombat: Shaolin Monks). Rumored characters included false reports of a red female ninja character dubbed "Scarlet" by fans, who was officially introduced as Skarlet in 2011's Mortal Kombat, and the male ninja Ermac, who originated from a misinterpreted indicator in the original game's audits menu and was teased in MKII before finally becoming playable in Ultimate Mortal Kombat 3. A nameless, flaming palette swap of Liu Kang seen in the background of the Pit II stage, initially dubbed "Torch" by fans, officially debuted in Mortal Kombat: Deadly Alliance as secret character Blaze, who later became the final boss of Mortal Kombat: Armageddon.

=== Related titles ===
Although the 1995 film Mortal Kombat was primarily based on the first game, it features elements from Mortal Kombat II, such as the characters Kitana and Shao Kahn, and the setting of Outworld. The Mortal Kombat II game also has some influences upon the 2026 film of the same name which has the highest critical reception of all movies in the Mortal Kombat franchise..

The plot and characters of the game served as the basis for the 2005 spin-off game Mortal Kombat: Shaolin Monks, a beat 'em up title which follows Liu Kang and Kung Lao as they fight their way through Outworld to defeat Shao Kahn. Some of the plot of Shaolin Monks, such as the death of Jade, is not cannon with the general Mortal Kombat game series.

The events of Mortal Kombat II, along with the first Mortal Kombat and Mortal Kombat 3 (including its expansions), were later retold in the 2011 game Mortal Kombat, which was an effective reboot of the series. In it, Raiden uses time travel to revisit the tournaments from the original games in the series in order to change the future in the aftermath of Armageddon. The ladder/arcade mode of this game can follow the same order of bosses as in MKII (with Shang Tsung, Kintaro and Shao Kahn as the final three opponents, although Goro will often be the ninth opponent instead of Kintaro) and its controls and Fatality system are most reminiscent of MKII. Classic costumes from MKII were also brought back as alternate outfits for female ninja characters, with some of these costumes exclusive to the PlayStation Vita version.

Mortal Kombat II was to be one of the three games remade in HD in the cancelled fighting game Mortal Kombat HD Arcade Kollection. A compilation titled Mortal Kombat Arcade Kollection was released instead.
