= Yu-Gi-Oh! Legacy of the Duelist: Link Evolution =

2019 video game

- Developer: Other Ocean Interactive
- Publisher: Konami
- Platforms: Windows; Xbox One; PlayStation 4 Nintendo Switch
- Release: 2019
- Genre: Digital collectible card game

Yu-Gi-Oh! Legacy of the Duelist: Link Evolution is 2019 video game from Other Ocean Interactive.

== Gameplay ==
In Yu-Gi-Oh! Legacy of the Duelist: Link Evolution, the gameplay unfolds as a simulation of the trading card game, offering players access to more than 9,000 cards spanning the franchise's history. Deck construction and strategy are central activities, with the game serving both as a teaching tool for newcomers—thanks to step‑by‑step tutorials on summoning mechanics—and as a sandbox for veterans to experiment with archetypes and tactics. The single‑player campaign recreates duels from all six series of the anime, presenting roughly 20–25 battles per chapter. Players can fight using "story" decks that mirror those seen in the show, or craft their own for greater challenge. Beyond the campaign, a Battle Pack mode lets duelists pull random cards from packs to build decks and face either AI opponents or other players online. The interface emphasizes accessibility, with search functions for finding the right card for a strategy. Progression comes through purchasing and opening packs.

== Reception ==
Reception

Review scores
Publication	Score
GameRevolution	3.5/5
Jeuxvideo	16/20
Newsweek	8.5/10
Nintendo World Report	8.5/10

Newsweek said "Legacy of the Duelist: Link Evolution is a must-have for fans of the Yu-Gi-Oh! series who are itching to do some dueling. Putting it on the Switch was a brilliant move, because now you can play a match or two wherever you are".

Kotaku said "There's plenty of fun stuff in Yu-Gi-Oh! Legacy of the Duelist: Link Evolution for competitive players. Ranked and unranked matches, local battles, and plenty of options for deck editing should keep them busy, and sealed play using Battle Packs sounds exciting".
