= CSI: Fatal Conspiracy =

2010 video game

- Developer: Telltale Games
- Publisher: Ubisoft
- Producer: David Felton
- Designer: John Drake
- Programmer: Carl Muckenhoupt
- Artist: Lèa Mai Nguyen
- Writers: John Drake; Chris Barbour; Jeff Lester; Rhianna Pratchett; Ed Keuhnel
- Composer: Jared Emerson-Johnson
- Engine: Telltale Tool
- Platforms: Microsoft Windows, PlayStation 3, Xbox 360, Wii
- Release: NA: October 26, 2010; EU: October 29, 2010; AU: November 25, 2010; EU: November 26, 2010 (Wii)
- Genre: Adventure
- Mode: Single player

CSI: Fatal Conspiracy is a video game based on the CSI: Crime Scene Investigation television series. It is the ninth CSI game released. It was released on 26 October 2010 (along with a companion Nintendo DS game CSI: Unsolved) on Microsoft Windows, PlayStation 3, Xbox 360 and Wii.

The game corresponds with the 10th season of the television series and includes the return of Sara Sidle.

A team of writers from the show were involved in the game's script, and Laurence Fishburne reprised his role from the television program.

== Gameplay ==
Throughout the game, the player meets and assists FBI Agent Gene Huntby, who is investigating crime lord Beatriz Salazar.

=== Case 1: Flash Baked ===
A burned out building turns into another crime scene when the player locates a dead body in it belonging to a woman named Portia Weismann who was the spa's manager. Sara Sidle is the player's partner in this case. The suspects are Brian Reed, victim's ex-boyfriend and Pedro Baxa, the spa owner.

It is later revealed that Pedro meant to burn down the spa to collect insurance money for Beatriz, and did not know Portia was in the building at the time. He is later found having committed suicide.

=== Case 2: Planting Evidence ===
A construction worker named Mark Ensign is found dead in the center of a construction site. Greg Sanders is the player's partner in this case. During the case, the victim is found to be depressed and suicidal. The suspects are Zachary Lynch, the construction supervisor, Marcus Kunchai, a plumber who is the victim's friend and Todd Stuart, a gardener and a supposed eco-terrorist.

It is revealed Todd murdered Mark and Zachary planted a fake suicide note.

=== Case 3: Tapped Out ===
A burn victim named Mary Marst becomes the victim of a homicide when her medical equipment is found to have been sabotaged. Nick Stokes gets paired with the player. The suspects are John Barrett, victim's step-brother, Jayne Barrett, victim's step-sister and Pauline Liu, victim's hospice nurse.

It is later revealed Jayne Barrett murdered Mary. During the case, evidence implicating Beatriz to the murder of her husband was contaminated with the player taking the fall.

=== Case 4: All Washed Up ===
A temp secretary named Jessica Marnier was found dead in her car at a car wash. The suspects are Veronica Carver, victim's best friend and housemate, Will Rice, victim's wealthy boyfriend and Manuel Molinez, a man who is the boyfriend's best friend and on parole. The player works with Catherine Willows on this case.

It is revealed Manuel Molinez murdered Jessica because she was looking into Beatriz. Will Rice is later found dead and evidence discovered that Beatriz, his biological mother, murdered him.

=== Case 5: Boss Fight ===
The cases worked on lead up to the climax of the game's main storyline. Dr. Raymond Langston is the player's partner on this case. This case has two parts as there are two murders with one belonging to Manuel Molinez (suspect from the previous case) and the other belonging to Agent Huntby. The main focus of the case is directed towards Beatriz and a sergeant named Timothy Lipp, who is Agent Huntby's brother-in-law.

Beatriz is eventually arrested, but later escapes.

== Reception ==
Reception

Aggregate scores
Aggregator	Score
GameRankings	(PC) 53.33% (X360) 47.50% (PS3) 40%
Metacritic	(PC) 47/100 (X360) 42/100 (PS3) 39/100

Review scores
Publication	Score
Adventure Gamers	2/5
Destructoid	5/10
GameZone	4.5/10
PlayStation Official Magazine – UK	3/10
Official Xbox Magazine (UK)	5/10
PC Gamer (US)	40%
PlayStation: The Official Magazine	5/10
The Daily Telegraph	6/10

Fatal Conspiracy was met with mixed reception upon release. GameRankings and Metacritic gave it 53.33% and 47 out of 100 for the PC version; 47.50% and 42 out of 100 for the Xbox 360 version; and 40% and 39 out of 100 for the PlayStation 3 version.
