= Ho-Sung Pak =

American actor (born 1967)

- Born: Ho-Sung Pak; November 6, 1967 (age 58); Seoul, South Korea
- Education: University of Illinois Urbana-Champaign (MBA)
- Occupations: Actor; producer; stuntman; martial artist
- Years active: 1991–present

Korean name
- Hangul: 박호성
- RR: Bak Hoseong
- MR: Pak Hosŏng

Ho-Sung Pak (Korean: 박호성; born November 6, 1967) is a South Korean-born American martial artist, actor, stuntman, and filmmaker. He is known for portraying Liu Kang in the Mortal Kombat video game series, and for his role as "Superstar" on the 1990s television series WMAC Masters. He has also been a stunt performer, coordinator, and fight choreographer on numerous film and television productions.

== Early life and martial arts ==
Pak was born in Seoul, South Korea and raised in Chicago, Illinois. He graduated from the University of Illinois Urbana-Champaign with a Master's of Business Administration in Engineering and Business.

Pak began studying Taekwondo at the age of 8, and later studied kung fu (Northern Praying Mantis, Shaolin, Tibetan White Crane), and wushu under Wu Bin. He was a Professional Karate Association (PKA) and North American Sports Karate Association (NASKA) forms champion, and won the 1991 Diamond Nationals Grand Championship in Men's Forms. That same year, he became the youngest entrant to date into the Black Belt Magazine Hall of Fame.

== Life and career ==
Pak was a stunt coordinator for the movie Teenage Mutant Ninja Turtles II: The Secret of the Ooze as well as a stunt double for Raphael; he later reprised his role of stunt double in the movie Teenage Mutant Ninja Turtles III.

In 1994, he was cast by director Lau Kar-leung as a villain in the Jackie Chan film The Legend of Drunken Master.

In 2002, he played the leading role in the martial arts movie Book of Swords. In it he portrayed Lang, an Asian cop who after witnessing the death of his brother during a drug bust gone wrong, leaves town only to come back three years later for revenge. The movie also starred MK actors Daniel Pesina, Katalin Zamiar and Richard Divizio. In a nod to his Mortal Kombat alter ego Liu Kang, Pak is shown wearing a red headband during the final part of the movie, while the other three actors are also seen in similar MK clothing/roles throughout the movie.

In 2009, Pak produced and starred in the martial film Fist of the Warrior, directed by Wayne A. Kennedy, also starring Roger Guenveur Smith, Peter Greene, Rosa Blasi and Sherilyn Fenn. The film was produced together with the film company GenOne.

In the 1995-1997 TV show WMAC Masters, his ki-symbol was "Superstar", which is a translation of his given Korean name. The show featured his older brother, Ho Young Pak ("Star Warrior"), as well as fellow Mortal Kombat actors Chris Casamassa ("Red Dragon") and Hakim Alston ("The Machine").

=== Mortal Kombat ===
Pak played lead character Liu Kang in the first Mortal Kombat and Mortal Kombat II, as well as the original elderly version of Shang Tsung in the first game. Pak, along with other actors from the first two Mortal Kombat games, refused to appear in Mortal Kombat 3 due to a royalty dispute with developer Midway over the use of their likenesses across various console versions of the first two games, resulting in the casting of new actors for some of the returning characters. This also led Pak to lose the opportunity to audition for the game's 1995 film adaptation.

In 1995, Pak and fellow Mortal Kombat actors Daniel Pesina, Katalin Zamiar, and Phillip Ahn lent their likenesses to a fighting game produced exclusively for the Atari Jaguar titled Thea Realm Fighters, but it was cancelled after Atari discontinued the failed system later that year.

== Filmography ==
Year	Film/television	Role	Notes
1991	Teenage Mutant Ninja Turtles II: The Secret of the Ooze	Raphael	Stunt double / Stunt coordinator
1992	Mortal Kombat	Liu Kang / Shang Tsung	Video game
1993	Mortal Kombat II	Liu Kang	Video game
1993	Teenage Mutant Ninja Turtles III	Raphael	Stunt double
1994	The Legend of Drunken Master	Henry	Alt. title: Jui kuen II, Drunken Fist II
1994	Common Enemy		Short / unreleased
1995	Thea Realm Fighters	Prince Pak / fight consultant	(game / unreleased)
1995-97	WMAC Masters	Superstar / Himself / Stunts	
1999	Angel	Stunts	
2000	Epoch of Lotus	Mortis / Action choreographer	Short
2001	Madonna: Drowned World Tour 2001	Choreographer	Documentary
2001	Alias	Stunts	
2003	Batman: Dark Tomorrow	Motion capture team	Video game
2004	Fight Club - video game	Action choreographer	
2004	Torque	Stunts	
2005	Entourage	Stunt gangster	episode: Chinatown
2005	BloodRayne	Kagan Vampire Guard #4	
2005	Alone in the Dark	Agent Marko	
2006	Dead and Deader	Superstar Merc / Stunt coordinator	
2006	18 Fingers of Death!	Young Buford	
2007	Fist of the Warrior	Lee Choe / Fight choreographer / Writer / Producer / Editor	Alt. title: Blood Money / Lesser of Three Evils / Manhattan Samoerai
2007	Book of Swords	Lang / Fight choreographer / Writer / Producer	
2008	I Am Somebody: No Chance in Hell	Pong	Alt. title: Chinaman's Chance
2010	The Last Airbender	Stunt fighter	
2010	Game of Death	Agent #2 / Big mental	
2011	Chicago Code	Stunts	
2011	Femme Fatales	Superstar Assassin / The Ghost / Fight choreographer	6 episodes
2011	Transformers: Dark of the Moon	Stunts	
2011	A Very Harold and Kumar Christmas	Stunt double: John Cho	
2012	Vamps	Stunts	
2012	Jinn	Stunts	
2012	Red Dawn	Stunt soldier	
2012	The Citizen	Motel worker	
2012	Legend of the Red Reaper	Special thanks	
2012	You Can't Kill Stephen King	Special thanks	
2013	BodyWeapon: The Black Ryu		
2013	Love and Honor	Stunts	Alt. title: AWOL
2013	Olympus Has Fallen	Stunts	
2015	Chicago P.D.	Stunts	2 episodes
2018	Westworld	Stunts / Stunt Performer	4 episodes
	Project X - Marks The Spot	Henchman / Stunt Performer	
2022	Bullet Train	Stunts	
2022	Weird: The Al Yankovic Story	Stunt Performer	
2025	Protector	Producer / Stunts	
2027	Twilight of the Dead †	Producer / Stunt coordinator	Post-production
TBA	Dawn of the Predator †	Jason	
