= Other Ocean =

Canadian-American video game developer

Other Ocean Interactive
- Formerly: Backbone Charlottetown (2006–2007)
- Type: Subsidiary
- Industry: Video games
- Founded: 6 February 2006; 20 years ago in Charlottetown, Canada
- Founder: Andrew Ayre
- Headquarters: St. John's, Newfoundland and Labrador, Canada
- Key people: Andrew Ayre (CEO)
- Parent: Backbone Entertainment (2006–2007); Other Ocean Group (2007–present)
- Divisions: Other Ocean Emeryville
- Website: otherocean.com

Other Ocean Interactive is a Canadian video game developer based in St. John's, Newfoundland and Labrador, and Emeryville, California. Originally founded in 2006 in Charlottetown, as a studio for Foundation 9 Entertainment, the studio was spun off as Other Ocean Interactive in May 2007. Since then, it has made eight games itself and has been involved in the development of 40 other games. Digital Eclipse was formerly part of the company from 2015 to 2023.

== History ==
Foundation 9 Entertainment, at the time the largest independent video game developer in North America, announced on 6 February 2006 that it was opening Backbone Charlottetown, a new internal studio based in Charlottetown, Canada. When co-founder Andrew Ayre left Foundation 9 a year later, he bought out and became the sole owner of the Backbone Charlottetown studio, which was renamed Other Ocean Interactive that May. By 2008, the company established headquarters in St. John's, Newfoundland and Labrador.

== Games developed ==
Other Ocean Interactive developed the following games:

Year	Title	Platform(s)	Notes
2008	Super Monkey Ball	iPhone	
2009	Neopets: Quizara's Curse	LeapFrog Didj	
2009	CSI: Deadly Intent - The Hidden Cases	Nintendo DS	
2010	Dark Void Zero	Nintendo DSiWare	
2010	Puffins: Let's Race!	Nintendo DS	
2010	Puffins: Let's Fish!	Nintendo DS	
2010	Puffins: Let's Roll!	Nintendo DS	
2010	CSI: Unsolved!	Nintendo DS	
2011	Mortal Kombat Arcade Kollection	Xbox LIVE Arcade	
2011	Spider-Man: Edge of Time	Nintendo DS	
2011	Iron Brigade	Windows	
2011	The War of The Worlds (2011)	Xbox LIVE Arcade	
2012	The Simpsons: Tapped Out	Android	
2012	Stacking	Windows	
2012	South Park: Tenorman's Revenge	Xbox LIVE Arcade	
2012	Poptropica Adventures	Nintendo DS	
2012	The Amazing Spider-Man	Nintendo DS	
2013	The Gunstringer: Dead Man Running	Windows	
2014	Hexic	Windows 8.1 Windows Phone	
2014	Yu-Gi-Oh! Duel Generation	iOS Android	Involved in development
2014	Yu-Gi-Oh! Millennium Duels	PlayStation 3 Xbox 360	Involved in development
2014	Costume Quest 2	Wii U	
2014	NBA Rush	iOS	Involved in development
2015	#IDARB	Windows Xbox One	
2015	Yu-Gi-Oh! Legacy of the Duelist	PlayStation 4 Windows Xbox One	Involved in development
2016	Giant Cop: Justice Above All	Windows	VR title for HTC Vive and Oculus Rift
2016	Super Time Force Ultra	PlayStation Vita	
2017	Minecraft: New Nintendo 3DS Edition	New Nintendo 3DS	
2019	Yu-Gi-Oh! Legacy of the Duelist: Link Evolution	Nintendo Switch, Windows, Xbox One, PlayStation 4	Involved in development
2019	Project Winter	Windows	
2019	MediEvil	PlayStation 4	Remake of the 1998 title, MediEvil
2021	Project Winter	Nintendo Switch, PlayStation 4, Xbox One	
2023	The Walking Dead: Betrayal	Windows	Launched in Early Access; discontinued on December 1, 2023, after cessation of development
2023	Diebrary	Browser game Windows	
TBA	Underlab	Windows	Self-described as a spiritual successor to Project Winter
Unreleased	Cloudy Mountain	Intellivision Amico	Remake of the 1982 title, Advanced Dungeons & Dragons
Unreleased	Night Stalker	Intellivision Amico	Remake of the 1982 title of the same name
