= Mortal Kombat Arcade Kollection =

2011 video game compilation

- North American cover art
- Developers: NetherRealm Studios; Other Ocean Interactive; Code Mystics
- Publisher: Warner Bros. Interactive Entertainment
- Series: Mortal Kombat
- Engine: Unreal Engine 3
- Platforms: PlayStation 3, Xbox 360, Windows
- Release: PlayStation 3 August 30, 2011; Xbox 360; August 31, 2011; Windows; February 1, 2012
- Genre: Fighting
- Modes: Single-player, multiplayer

Mortal Kombat Arcade Kollection is a 2011 video game compilation co-developed by NetherRealm Studios, Other Ocean Interactive and Code Mystics and published by Warner Bros. Games. It is a compilation of three classic 2D fighting games in the Mortal Kombat series. The game was created after an ambitious HD remake project titled Mortal Kombat HD Arcade Kollection was cancelled. Arcade Kollection was released as a downloadable title for PlayStation 3 (via PlayStation Network) and Xbox 360 (via Xbox Live Arcade) in August 2011, and for Microsoft Windows (via Steam) on February 1, 2012.

== Gameplay ==
The game is a compilation of the first three Mortal Kombat games: Mortal Kombat (1992), Mortal Kombat II (1993) and Ultimate Mortal Kombat 3 (1995). Along with a few very minor changes to them, it features online multiplayer, pause menus, achievements, also making unlockable characters always available in online mode.

== Development ==
The game was originally conceived as an HD remake of the early Mortal Kombat games, featuring remade character sprites, new backgrounds and new user interface system, before the scope of the project was changed. Known as Mortal Kombat HD Arcade Kollection, it was supposed to be made by Other Ocean Interactive, the studio that has created Ultimate Mortal Kombat for the Nintendo DS. This project was never even officially announced before it was canceled, and a simple compilation of original games was released instead, also created by Other Ocean.

Graphical assets, such as Zbrush models for the Animalities and Mileena's unmasked face were leaked by the artist Jeremy Kohar in 2013. Previously, more concept art from the project was revealed by the artist John Montenegro. In 2014, make-up artist Tanea Brooks released pictures of herself helping the new actors for Liu Kang, Kitana, Kung Lao, Shao Kahn, and Sonya Blade prepare for a shooting session for HD Kollection. Another attempt at re-editing the original trilogy in HD was made by Blind Squirrel Games, but was also cancelled before it came to be.

== Reception ==
Reception

Aggregate scores
Aggregator	Score
GameRankings	61.53% (X360); 60.62% (PS3)
Metacritic	62/100 (X360); 59/100 (PS3)

The game received generally mixed or average reviews at release.
