= Guy Aoki =

American civil rights activist (born 1962)

- Born: May 12, 1962 (age 64); Hilo, Hawaii, U.S.
- Education: Occidental College; University of Hawaii at Manoa
- Occupation: Civil rights activist

Guy Aoki (born May 12, 1962) is an American civil rights activist. He is the leader of the Media Action Network for Asian Americans (MANAA), which he co-founded in 1992. He is also a contributing columnist for The Rafu Shimpo, and debates publicly on Asian American issues.

== Media appearances ==
During the 1980s, Aoki was part of the production staff for the American Top 40 radio program.

In 2017 Aoki appeared in "One Nation, Under Comedy", the fourth episode of CNN's documentary program The History of Comedy.

== Views on positive media developments ==
Aoki has praised Harold & Kumar Go to White Castle and its sequel for using Asian actors in leading roles as "Relatable, regular guys."

Aoki has also praised the 1950s television comedy Bachelor Father for prominently featuring Asian actors and storylines, including "feisty" comedian Sammee Tong and Victor Sen Yung, the scheming "Uncle Charlie," "a slick, Americanized character. I thought it was great that way back in the ’50s, audiences saw a Chinese American who acted just like anyone else."

== Campaigns against media ==
Aoki is concerned with negative portrayals of Asians in the media and has launched several organized campaigns to highlight his views.

=== Los Angeles riots and Nightline ===
During the 1992 Los Angeles riots in which some rioters targeted stores owned by Koreans and other ethnic Asians, Aoki became frustrated with early coverage by ABC News Nightline. Ted Koppel interviewed Black leaders about the Black/Korean conflict. The opinions shared about Korean-Americans, and the lack of Korean American interview subjects drew criticism from Aoki, who stated that the episode was not responsible journalism. Later episodes included the Korean-American perspective.

=== Rising Sun ===
Aoki and MANAA protested the 1993 film Rising Sun at the time of its release. Aoki was concerned that the villainous behavior on the part of the Japanese antagonists in the film would promote negative stereotypes of Asian Americans, observing that Internment of Japanese Americans began with media demonization.

=== Sarah Silverman controversy ===
In July 2001, Aoki became embroiled in a public controversy stemming from his objection to a joke told by comedian Sarah Silverman, which involved her use of the ethnic slur "chink", in an interview on the July 11, 2001 episode of Late Night with Conan O'Brien.

In the interview, Silverman explained that a friend had advised her on how to avoid jury duty by writing a racial slur on the selection form, "something really inappropriate, like, 'I hate chinks'." However, Silverman said that she ultimately decided that she did not want to be thought of as a racist and instead wrote, "I love chinks." The Associated Press quoted Aoki: "There is no excuse for something like this to have made the air. The term is the most offensive possible reference to a person of Chinese descent." NBC and Conan O'Brien issued an apology, but Silverman did not, insisting later on the July 26, 2001 episode of Politically Incorrect that she did not believe that Aoki was genuinely offended, but exploiting the opportunity for publicity.

Silverman and Aoki later appeared together on the August 22, 2001 episode of Politically Incorrect, along with host Bill Maher and panelists David Spade and Anne-Marie Johnson, the latter of whom was chair of the Screen Actors Guild Ethnic Employment Opportunity Committee. After Silverman repeated the joke for exposition's sake, she opined that it made an implicit statement about the wrongness of racism, rather than legitimizing it. Johnson, however, questioned the humor in the joke, and Aoki opined that such slurs should not be used in an off-the-cuff manner because it legitimized their use, and that use of the word "chink" was no better than the use of the word "nigger". Aoki, while acknowledging that satire was a legitimate practice, stated that Silverman's execution of it was not successful because it ran the risk that people would assume she actually subscribed to the racist viewpoint of her character.

=== Banzai controversy ===
In July 2003 Media Action Network protested the British program Banzai, which is produced by Channel 4. Following the first U.S. broadcast of the series on the Fox Network on July 13, 2003, the Media Action Network accused the program, a spoof betting show that parodies Japanese game shows, of employing demeaning stereotypes of Asians. About 20 members of the group carried signs and shouted slogans outside a presentation by the Fox network to TV critics in Hollywood. Aoki commented, "This is like an Asian minstrel show. Can you imagine the black version of Banzai?" Fox spokesman Scott Grogin responded by saying, "We've received an entire range of comments on the show, both pro and con", and that as a satire, the show should be viewed as "tongue-in-cheek". According to Aoki, in discussions with the MANAA, Fox offered to include a disclaimer at the beginning of the show, but Aoki indicated that this would not assuage the MANAA, who wished the program not be broadcast at all.
