= Nightwolf =

Mortal Kombat character

- Mortal Kombat character
- Nightwolf artwork by John Tobias for Mortal Kombat 3 (1995)
- First appearance: Mortal Kombat 3 (1995)
- Created by: Ed Boon; John Tobias
- Designed by: John Tobias
- Voiced by: List: Todd Robert Thawley (animated series); Larry Omaha (MK9); Daniel Luján (MK11)
- Portrayed by: Litefoot (1997 film)
- Motion capture: Sal Divita (MK3)

In-universe information
- Origin: United States
- Nationality: American

Nightwolf (/ˈnaɪtˌwʊlf/ NIGHT-wulf) is a supporting character from the video game series Mortal Kombat, created by Midway Games. He debuted in Mortal Kombat 3 (1995) as a Native American shaman selected to defend the Earth against invading forces from the savage realm of Outworld. In addition to his fighting prowess, Nightwolf possesses magical abilities that allow him to enhance his strength and create weapons.

The character has appeared in various media outside of the games, including as one of the central heroes in the animated series Mortal Kombat: Defenders of the Realm (1996), and as a supporting character in the film Mortal Kombat Annihilation. While his portrayal in the franchise has been criticized as a stereotype of Native Americans, his depiction in the rebooted games has received a mixed reception.

== Design and gameplay ==
During early development of Mortal Kombat 3, the character was known simply as "Indian" before his name was determined. Ed Boon described him to Video Games & Computer Entertainment magazine in April 1995 (issue #75) as "a very nontraditional Indian. He doesn't swing an axe that he's always holding, like Chief Thunder from Killer Instinct. He doesn't have all of the stereotypical Indian-type things like T. Hawk or Chief Thunder; he doesn't go 'Hoya! Hoya!' and all that." Nightwolf uses a mystical set of weapons (a tomahawk and a bow and arrow) in battle. Nightwolf was portrayed by Midway Games artist Sal DiVita in the game. DiVita said about his casting: "I was just walking around and John [Tobias] said, 'Hey, man, you've got some arms; hey, got a big chest. You want to be a character?' I'm like, 'Sure!' And that's how it happened."

According to guides by both Mean Machines Sega and SuperGamePower, the best part about him in the original MK3 was his then-unique ability to deflect any projectile back towards an opponent. Total 64 opined that, once mastered, Nightwolf "is one of the brightest stars" of Mortal Kombat Trilogy, as "none of his moves are seemingly useful at the start, but stick[ing] with him [might] get some great results." Prima Games' official guide for Armageddon gave Nightwolf a poor overall rating of 4/10, stating that the character, "while being a solid punisher character, has a difficult time inflicting heavy damage on opponents." In Prima Games' official guide for the 2011 Mortal Kombat reboot, Nightwolf was judged to be a much-improved character due to his "shoulder and power charge moves [used] to knock down" opponents and his uppercut being "an excellent move to counter jumpers."

== Appearances ==
=== Mortal Kombat games ===
Nightwolf is introduced in Mortal Kombat 3 as a historian and shaman whose patch of tribal land provides a vital protective area for Raiden's chosen Earthrealm defenders during Shao Kahn's invasion. As his homeland was protected by shamanic magic, Nightwolf would soon be joined by the other chosen warriors. He returned during the events of Mortal Kombat: Deception. In the events leading to the game, he suffered recurring nightmares of the Dragon King Onaga's resurrection. Despite knowing a new threat was coming, he was unable to stop his nightmares from coming true when Reptile transformed into Onaga. His forefathers handed down the means with which he could defeat Onaga, by becoming a "Sin Eater', absorbing the sins of his tribe. He traveled to the Netherrealm, drew Onaga's soul to him, and released his ancestors' absorbed sins to remove Onaga from Reptile and bind the former to the Netherrealm.

In Mortal Kombat: Armageddon, having completed his quest, Nightwolf was guided back to Earthrealm by his spirit guides. Along the way, he received visions of a battle where an unknown power was forcing the participating warriors to fight each other. His visions slowly became reality when he agreed to help Johnny Cage and his allies combat the fallen Elder God Shinnok and his forces. While preparing for the battle, Nightwolf was met by Kitana and the spirit of Liu Kang, who was bound to Earth through his bond with her. Despite being weakened by his fight with Onaga, Nightwolf used his remaining magic to relieve Kitana of her burden and took custody of Liu Kang's spirit.

In the 2011 reboot, Nightwolf is seen as a participant in the first Mortal Kombat tournament. When Shang Tsung selects him as Scorpion's next opponent, Nightwolf berates Scorpion for his quest for vengeance though the latter accuses the former of dishonoring his people by not seeking vengeance for the injustices they have suffered. Nightwolf proceeds to fight Scorpion, but is defeated and eliminated from the tournament. He is later seen among the Earthrealm warriors who congratulate Liu Kang for winning the tournament, though he is not present during the victory ceremony nor the second tournament. He reappears during Outworld's invasion to recruit Stryker. During the battle, Nightwolf destroys Shao Kahn's Soulnado and survived Sindel's initial onslaught. Ultimately, however, Nightwolf sacrifices himself to destroy Sindel during her second assault, allowing the sorcerer Quan Chi to claim his soul and turn him into one of his underlings.

Nightwolf returns in Mortal Kombat 11, with his human self from the 2011 reboot as his default appearance while his revenant form appears as an alternate gear appearance. In his arcade ending, a young Nightwolf -- then known as Grey Cloud -- initially resented his people for selling out to the colonizers and fell in with Kano's Black Dragon crime cartel as a result. However, when Kano asked him to help steal the Matoka's sacred treasures, he refused. Kano mortally wounded him in retaliation, but the Great Spirit saved him and granted Grey Cloud the mantle of Nightwolf. In the DLC story expansion, Aftermath, a past version of Nightwolf joined forces with Shang Tsung and Fujin to retrieve Kronika's Crown of Souls and help Liu Kang restore history. While battling his revenant counterpart during a mission to capture Sindel's revenant and revive her, Shang Tsung drained revenant Nightwolf's soul in retaliation for wounding him. Despite securing the Crown and taking part in assaulting Kronika's keep, Nightwolf and his allies were betrayed by Shang Tsung and Sindel.

=== Other media and merchandise ===
Nightwolf is a major character in the 1996 cartoon series Mortal Kombat: Defenders of the Realm, voiced by Tod Thawley. He serves to offer spiritual and technical help to the Earthrealm warriors and is depicted as having expertise in computer technology. He has a pet wolf named Kiva who could merge with Nightwolf to increase his power. He briefly appeared in the 1997 film Mortal Kombat Annihilation, and was played by Native American rapper and actor Litefoot. He also briefly appears in a flashback as a revenant in the 2022 animated film Mortal Kombat Legends: Snow Blind. An action figure of Nightwolf was released by Jazwares in July 2012. It came in two versions, 4-inch and 6-inch. In July 2022, a figure based on his Mortal Kombat 11 appearance was released by MacFarlane Toys.

== Reception ==
=== Ethnic representation ===
Nightwolf is often unfavorably discussed in the context of the portrayal of Native Americans in video games. Boon's description of the character in the April 1995 issue of VideoGames & Computer Entertainment provoked a comment from the magazine three issues later: "For a character who has been described as a 'nontraditional Indian,' he certainly has all the trappings of one. Let's see, he wears feathers and war paint, swings a hatchet, shoots arrows...could there be a 'Scalp' Fatality?" In a 2008 feature on Native American stereotyping in video games, GamesRadar+ designated Nightwolf as the "warrior" trope: "[W]hile this pro-Indian sentiment is certainly heartwarming, much of Nightwolf’s character is wide of the mark." The site added that the act of "sin-eating" (his role in MK Deception) was actually European in origin. The same year, Rob Bricken of Topless Robot said that "Nightwolf’s design and backstory [in MK3] are standard-issue for Native American characters in fighting games", while censuring the game itself as "where the designers were free to throw [in] any horrible, out-of-place idea". Robert Naytor of Hardcore Gaming 101 said, "In the mid-'90s, it was practically an unwritten law that every fighting game had to have either a Bruce Lee clone, [or] a Native American ... Nightwolf takes up the latter slot," a belief that was shared by Gavin Jasper of Den of Geek. Complex deemed Nightwolf the top stereotypical character in video games in 2012, describing him as "the epitome of every red-skinned, feather-wearing sports mascot and old cowboy movie serial ... [he] has warpaint on his face, a feather in his hair and the sleeveless vest as if Geronimo himself just gave it up."

In the 2018 study Representation of Native Americans: From Literature to Video Games, Samuel Martínez Linares stated, "Although Nightwolf is in fact provided with a real tribal background, his Apache heritage seems to be mixed up with other cultural religious practices that are not related whatsoever to Native American ones." Linares noted his "rhino charge" special move in the series as "outdated", as the rhinoceros had been extinct in North America "since the Pliocene epoch". He additionally compared Nightwolf to T. Hawk from the Street Fighter series in that their "long hair [and] bow and arrows make it hard to distinguish" both characters, "which reinforces the idea of the pan-Indian construct." Enacting Videogame Development through Indigenous-Led Creation author Maize Longboat wrote, "His portrayal as a violent tribal warrior with magic powers reproduces harmful stereotypes perpetuated in popular media." In How Indigenous Designers are Changing the Landscape of Video Games, Ashlee Bird compared Nightwolf to fellow series character Kotal Kahn: "Why, in a game where men with four arms, necromancers, and people with all kinds of cybernetic enhancements exist, did the only two Native characters still exclusively wear feathers and animal skin and either perform as the noble savage, communing with the spirits and sacrificing themselves for the “greater good” or, the bloodthirsty warrior, sacrificing humans to an unmerciful deity?"

The depiction of Nightwolf in Mortal Kombat 11 (2019) is generally seen as an improvement in his visual design by critics for being less of a stereotype of Native Americans.

Nightwolf's Mortal Kombat 11 incarnation has received a more mixed reception. Tuscarora Haud of Indian Country Today rated him a 2.5 out of 10 in her 2019 ranking of Native American portrayals in video games, opining that NetherRealm Studios' "attempts at a reboot of Nightwolf has led him to be more stereotypically savage and the creative team has not taken any criticism from the Native community in redesigning or retiring the character." While The Daily Aztec, in 2022, described Nightwolf as embodying "the 'Mystic Warrior' archetype [that] trivializes and exploits many Native beliefs", Mitchell Saltzman of IGN said that "his gear and skins all feel respectfully done and avoid the pitfall of stereotypes." Christopher Teuton of Screen Rant said in 2019: "Nightwolf, although many players' personal favorite, has long been considered a somewhat offensive character in the eyes of the public ... although his MK9 reboot gave him a more rounded persona it's still easy to make parallels to Native American tropes. While it's never a good idea to go around looking for positive representation in a game that features fully-rendered testicular explosions, at least Mortal Kombat 11's Nightwolf seems far less directly offensive than characters like Killer Instinct's Chief Thunder."

=== Other reception ===
Complex ranked Nightwolf among the most underrated characters in the series, stating that "the fact that he can transform into a wolf and maul you to death should tell you he's nothing to play with." IGN praised his "versatile playstyle" in MK11 in that "NetherRealm did a great job of making Nightwolf’s moveset feel unique and fun, despite the fact that many of his signature moves are actually kind of plain."

As was the case with most of the character portrayals in Mortal Kombat Annihilation, Nightwolf's appearance was critically panned. Alasdair Wilkins of io9 commented on a scene showing Nightwolf knocking Liu Kang unconscious with his hatchet: "Nightwolf isn't just a magical shapeshifting shaman who only exists to show the hero his destiny...he's also kind of an asshole." Kate Willaert of Game Informer remarked, "Nightwolf delivers the best line in the movie when he tells Liu Kang he must test his courage, and find his Animality. ... As a result, the film's final climactic battle turns into Primal Rage: The Movie." Charlie Ridgely at ComicBook.com listed Nightwolf as one of the characters they want to see in the sequel to the 2021 live-action film, reasoning "Nightwolf is a noble hero and could replace the stoic nature of Kung Lao, providing a perfect foil for Johnny Cage's nonsense."
