= Mortal Kombat 11 =

2019 video game

- North American cover art featuring Scorpion
- Developer: NetherRealm Studios (Note: Windows version ported by QLOC. Nintendo Switch version ported by Shiver Entertainment.)
- Publisher: Warner Bros. Interactive Entertainment
- Director: Ed Boon
- Producer: Graeme Bayless
- Designer: John Edwards
- Programmer: Gavin Freyberg
- Artist: Steve Beran
- Writers: Dominic Cianciolo; Shawn Kittelsen
- Composer: Wilbert Roget II (Note: Gameplay music composed by Dan Forden, Nathan Grigg, Rich Carle, Matthias Wolf, and Armin Haas.)
- Series: Mortal Kombat
- Engine: Unreal Engine 3
- Platforms: PlayStation 4, Windows, Xbox One, Nintendo Switch, Stadia, PlayStation 5, Xbox Series X/S
- Release: April 23, 2019: PS4, Windows, Xbox One; WW: April 23, 2019 Switch; NA: April 23, 2019; EU: May 10, 2019 Stadia; WW: November 19, 2019 PS5, Xbox Series X/S; WW: November 17, 2020
- Genre: Fighting
- Modes: Single-player, multiplayer

Mortal Kombat 11 is a 2019 fighting game developed by NetherRealm Studios and published by Warner Bros. Interactive Entertainment. It is the eleventh main installment in the Mortal Kombat franchise and a sequel to Mortal Kombat X (2015). The game was announced at The Game Awards 2018 and was released in North America and Europe on April 23, 2019, for Nintendo Switch, PlayStation 4, Windows, and Xbox One—with the exception of Europe's Switch version which was released on May 10, 2019. It was released on Stadia on November 19, 2019.

Upon release, the console versions of Mortal Kombat 11 received generally favorable reviews, which praised the gameplay, story, graphics, and improved netcode, but it received criticism for the presence of microtransactions and over-reliance on grinding. An expansion was released on May 26, 2020, entitled Aftermath. It includes an additional story mode, three new characters, new stages, and the return of stage fatalities and the friendship finishing move. An enhanced version of the game containing all downloadable content up to that point, titled Mortal Kombat 11: Ultimate, was released for the Nintendo Switch, PlayStation 4, PlayStation 5, Xbox One, and Xbox Series X/S on November 17, 2020. A sequel, and series reboot, Mortal Kombat 1, was released on September 19, 2023.

== Gameplay ==
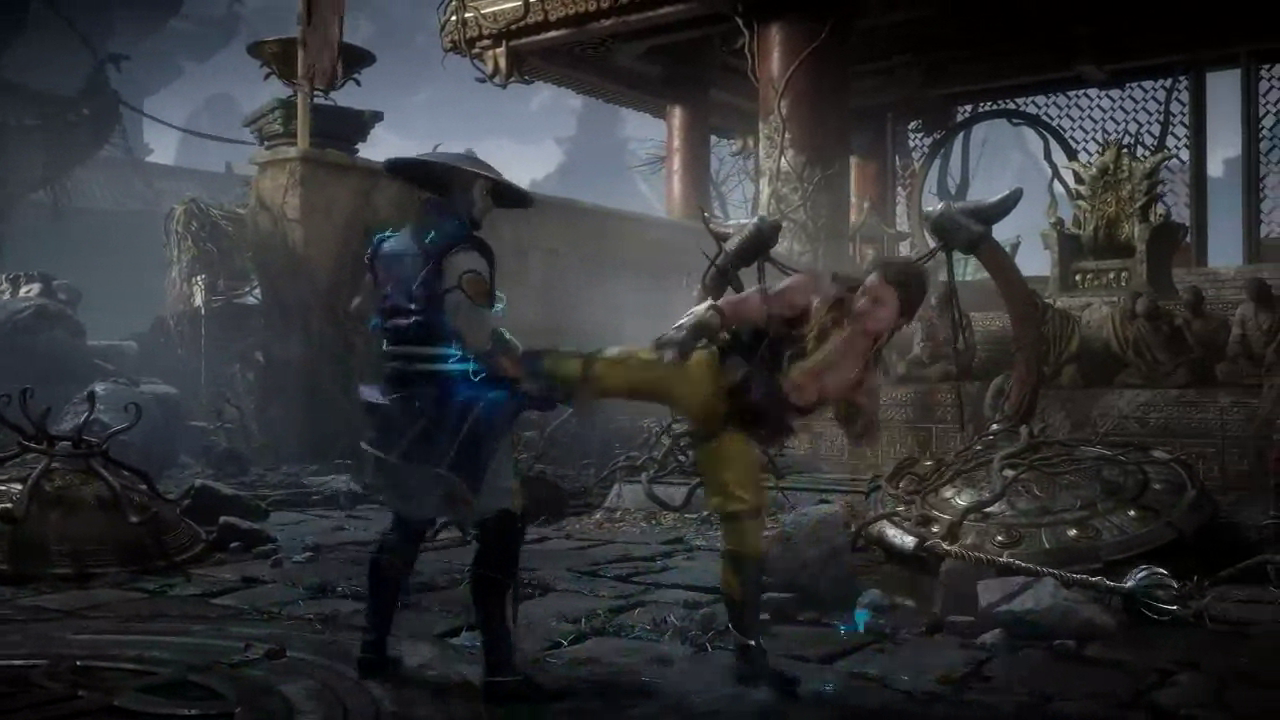
Raiden and Shang Tsung in battle

Like the previous three games in the series, including Mortal Kombat Mobile, Mortal Kombat 11 is a 2.5D fighting game. Alongside the returning Fatalities, Brutalities, Stage Fatalities, Friendships and Quitalities, new gameplay features are introduced, such as Fatal Blows and Krushing Blows. Fatal Blows are special moves similar to the X-ray moves in the 2011 reboot and Mortal Kombat X. Like X-ray moves, Fatal Blows deal a large amount of damage, but unlike them, they only become available when a player's health drops below 30%, and can only be performed once per match. Unlike Mortal Kombat X and Mortal Kombat Komplete edition, Fatal blows don't show bones or other parts of the human body and can be classified as a downgrade from previous versions. Krushing Blows are a critical hit variation of a given special move or combination, triggered when certain requirements are met and cause deadly effect by showing graphic body injuries and draining at most times 30% health in a single hit. New to the series is a Flawless Block mechanic, which allows for a comeback window after blocking an attack with precise timing. Another returning finisher is Mercy, last seen in Mortal Kombat Trilogy, where the winning player can opt to revive their opponent after the "Finish Him/Her" prompt, causing the opponent to gain a small amount of life.

Mortal Kombat 11 introduces a Kustom Variation feature which offers a character customization system similar to the Gear system in NetherRealm Studios' previous DC Comics fighting game Injustice 2, improving over the Variation system featured in Mortal Kombat X. Each character has an initial set of skins, gears and moves, which can be further customized by the player. However, unlike Injustice 2, in Mortal Kombat 11 the characters' appearance does not determine their abilities, allowing players to create custom move lists independently of their character's appearance. Online modes now feature cross-play for the first time in the series. However, the feature is in beta and this excludes Nintendo Switch, PC and Stadia.

== Plot ==
Following Shinnok's defeat, Dark Raiden plans to protect Earthrealm by destroying all of its enemies and making an example of Shinnok, decapitating him. This latter act inspires Kronika, the keeper of time, to rewrite history to undo Raiden's interference and erase him from existence. Two years later, a Special Forces strike team led by Sonya Blade, Cassie Cage, and Jacqui Briggs attack the Netherrealm, with Raiden providing assistance. The team succeeds in destroying the Netherrealm castle, at the cost of Sonya's life. Kronika forms an alliance with revenants and Netherrealm's rulers, Liu Kang and Kitana, immediately afterwards.

Meanwhile, Kotal Kahn, the current emperor of Outworld, attempts to execute Shao Kahn's loyalist Kollector, but is interrupted by a time storm that brings Shao Kahn, Skarlet, Baraka, and younger versions of Kano, Erron Black, Jade, Raiden, Kitana, Liu Kang, Johnny Cage, Sonya, Jax, Scorpion, Kabal, Triborg and Kung Lao from the past and erases Dark Raiden from existence. A battle erupts in Kotal's Koliseum until D'Vorah transports Baraka, Kollector, Skarlet, Shao Kahn, Triborg, Black, and Kano to her hive, recruiting them into Kronika's fold.

Liu Kang, Kung Lao, and Raiden appear at the Earthrealm's Special Forces HQ after forging an alliance with Kotal while Jade and Kitana aid Kotal in protecting Outworld from Kronika's forces. Liu Kang and Kung Lao investigate the Wu Shi Academy and encounter Kronika's right-hand man, Geras. Their battle ends with Geras using his chronokinetic powers to escape with powerful energy capsules containing Earthrealm's life force.

The Special Forces learn that Sektor, backed by Noob Saibot, Triborg and a cyberized Frost, has reinstated the Cyber Lin Kuei to build an army of cyborgs out of kidnapped Lin Kuei warriors for Kronika. Grandmasters Sub-Zero and Scorpion shut down Sektor's factory with Cyrax's aid, forcing Geras, Black, and both versions of Kano to retreat to Kronika's Keep, where they revive Sektor and rebuild the cybernetic army themselves.

Meanwhile, Raiden consults with the Elder Gods. They cannot intervene as the time storm is draining their power, but Shinnok's twin sister Cetrion gives him a clue on how to defeat Kronika. During a later attempt, Raiden discovers Cetrion had betrayed and killed the Elder Gods to serve her mother: Kronika. Kotal and Jade go to a Tarkatan camp to ask for their help fighting against Shao Kahn, but Kotal's hatred towards the Tarkatans causes Jade to battle him before Shao Khan appears and captures him.

The Special Forces base is destroyed by the Black Dragon gang and Triborg's upgraded cybernetic army, with the younger Johnny and Sonya captured, the elder Johnny wounded, and Triborg activating Sektor's self-destruction mode in the process. Due to this and the destruction of Sub-Zero's Lin Kuei Temple and the Wu Shi Academy's Sky Temple, Earthrealm's heroes reconvene at Scorpion's Fire Garden. Cassie leads a strike team to save her parents, where Sonya kills the younger Kano to erase his present self from existence. Meanwhile, Kitana, Liu Kang, and Kung Lao battle Baraka to secure an alliance between him and Sheeva. With their aid, Kitana successfully defeats and blinds Shao Kahn, uniting the Outworld factions and inheriting the throne from Kotal.

Raiden sends younger Jax and Jacqui to Shang Tsung's now-abandoned island to retrieve the Crown of Souls, but the pair are thwarted by Cetrion, who eventually escapes with the Crown, and present-day Jax, who had been deceived by Kronika into helping her in exchange for averting his time as a revenant. Scorpion is tasked with convincing Kharon, the ferryman of Netherrealm's souls, to join their side so they can travel to Kronika's fortress. Scorpion fights his younger self and persuades him to join his side, but is fatally wounded by D'Vorah. Young Scorpion drives her away and returns to the Fire Garden to honor his older self's dying wish. Refusing to believe him, Raiden attacks him on sight using Shinnok's amulet. Liu Kang intervenes, causing Raiden to realize how they have fought before across multiple timelines and that Kronika had orchestrated them all because she fears their combined strength. Anticipating this, Kronika kidnaps Liu Kang. With Kharon recruited, a joint Earthrealm-Outworld army assaults Kronika's Keep. Geras is dropped in the bottomless Sea of Blood; Frost is shut down, Triborg is defeated and decapitated by Scorpion, disabling the cyber Lin Kuei; and the present Jax defects to the heroes' side.

Once revenant Liu Kang has absorbed his past self's soul, Kronika sends him to attack Raiden, who defeats him and eventually merges with him to become Fire God Liu Kang. The heroes breach Kronika's Keep, but Kronika rewinds time. With his god-like status making him immune, Liu Kang defeats the remaining revenants and Cetrion. Kronika then absorbs Cetrion's essence to strengthen herself enough to reverse time back to the primordial state of the universe, erasing all the events in the franchise from existence. Fire God Liu Kang is left unaffected due to his godly status. Kronika and Fire God Liu Kang fight one final time to determine the fate of the New Era.

Depending on the outcome of the battle, the epilogue will show one of the following:

- If Kronika wins, she decapitates Liu Kang and declares the beginning of the New Era. The player is then urged to replay the fight.
- If Liu Kang defeats Kronika, but loses one round, he kills Kronika and meets a now-mortal Raiden, who offers to become Liu Kang's advisor for as long as his lifespan lasts. This is the canon ending that sets the stage for the expansion Mortal Kombat 11: Aftermath.
- If Liu Kang defeats Kronika in two consecutive rounds, he kills Kronika and meets a now-mortal Raiden, who allows Liu Kang to choose someone to accompany him by the Hourglass. Liu Kang chooses Kitana, and both vow to create a new and better timeline while undoing Kronika's mistakes.

=== Aftermath ===
Following Kronika's defeat, Fire God Liu Kang and Raiden attempt to utilize Kronika's Hourglass to restore history, but are interrupted by Shang Tsung, Fujin, and Nightwolf, who were all imprisoned in a timeless void by Kronika for refusing to join her. Shang Tsung elaborates that, due to the destruction of the Crown of Souls when Liu Kang defeated Kronika, the Hourglass cannot be used to change history without destroying it. He convinces Liu Kang to send him, Fujin, and Nightwolf back in time to retrieve the Crown of Souls before Cetrion does. Despite Raiden's suspicions of Shang Tsung, Liu Kang agrees and sends the trio back, staying behind to protect the Hourglass.

Shang Tsung, Fujin, and Nightwolf are transported to the Koliseum just as Kitana confronted Shao Kahn. They attempt to flee undetected, but news spreads of their arrival, prompting Kronika to retaliate. To face Cetrion on his island, Shang Tsung determines their best option is to resurrect Sindel, so they head to the Netherrealm, fights off the revenants Nightwolf, Triborg and Kabal and captures her revenant. Returning to Outworld, Shang Tsung uses Sheeva's blood debt to Sindel to gain access to the Soul Chamber and restore Sindel despite fierce resistance from Kitana, Jade, Kotal, Black, and Baraka.

Sindel accompanies Shang Tsung and the others to his island, where Fujin defeats Kronika's forces and convinces present-day Jax to defect early while Sindel defeats Cetrion and helps the group capture the Crown. Fujin and Shang Tsung travel to the Fire Garden to convince Raiden of Shang Tsung's alliance. When Kronika attempts to intervene, Raiden, Fujin, and Shang Tsung fend her off, though she reveals the sorcerer was the one who designed the Crown.

As the offensive on Kronika's Keep is about to commence, Shang Tsung signals Sindel to heal Shao Kahn. The pair then betray and defeat Sheeva, gaining control of her army before destroying Geras, imprisoning the Cage family, defeating Kitana, Liu Kang, and Jade, throwing Kung Lao into the Sea of Blood, and executing Kotal. It is revealed that Sindel was never brainwashed and had willingly married Shao Kahn after he conquered her realm by killing her former husband and Kitana's biological father. While Fujin spearheads the offensive on Kronika's Keep, Raiden discovers Shang Tsung's plot and Sindel's betrayal while fighting Revenant Liu Kang when the latter receives injuries from his past self.

Raiden arrives too late to stop Shang Tsung from tricking Fujin into giving him the Crown. The sorcerer gains Kronika's full power, revealing he had planned everything after Kronika imprisoned him. He overpowers and drains Raiden and Fujin's souls before using Sindel and Shao Kahn to reach the Hourglass, but leaves them both alive. Once Kronika's remaining revenants and her allies, Triborg and Frost, are all killed, Shang Tsung betrays and kills Sindel and Shao Kahn and takes their souls as well before murdering and erasing Kronika from existence, gaining the last of her power. As he starts approaching the Hourglass to mold his New Era, Fire God Liu Kang appears, revealing he was aware of Shang Tsung's intentions and, knowing he was the only one strong enough to defeat Kronika, allowed Shang Tsung to stay alive to protect the Crown.

From this point, the player can choose their "final destiny" and fight as Shang Tsung or Liu Kang. Depending on the outcome of the battle, the story ends in one of the following outcomes:

- If Shang Tsung wins, he defeats Liu Kang and absorbs his soul, gaining his godly power in the process. He then uses the Hourglass to become a Titan and conquer all the realms under his influence, with Dark Raiden and Fujin becoming his servants.
- If Liu Kang wins, he erases Shang Tsung from existence and recovers the Crown, with which he gains control over the Hourglass. Once he forges his own New Era, he visits the Shaolin temple to train Kung Lao's ancestor, the Great Kung Lao, to become his champion in Mortal Kombat.
  - Even though the final battle ripped apart the fabric of time, which created multiple timelines in which every character in the Mortal Kombat universe defeated Kronika and took control of the Hourglass, Mortal Kombat 1, the sequel to 11, is primarily set within Liu Kang's timeline.

== Characters ==
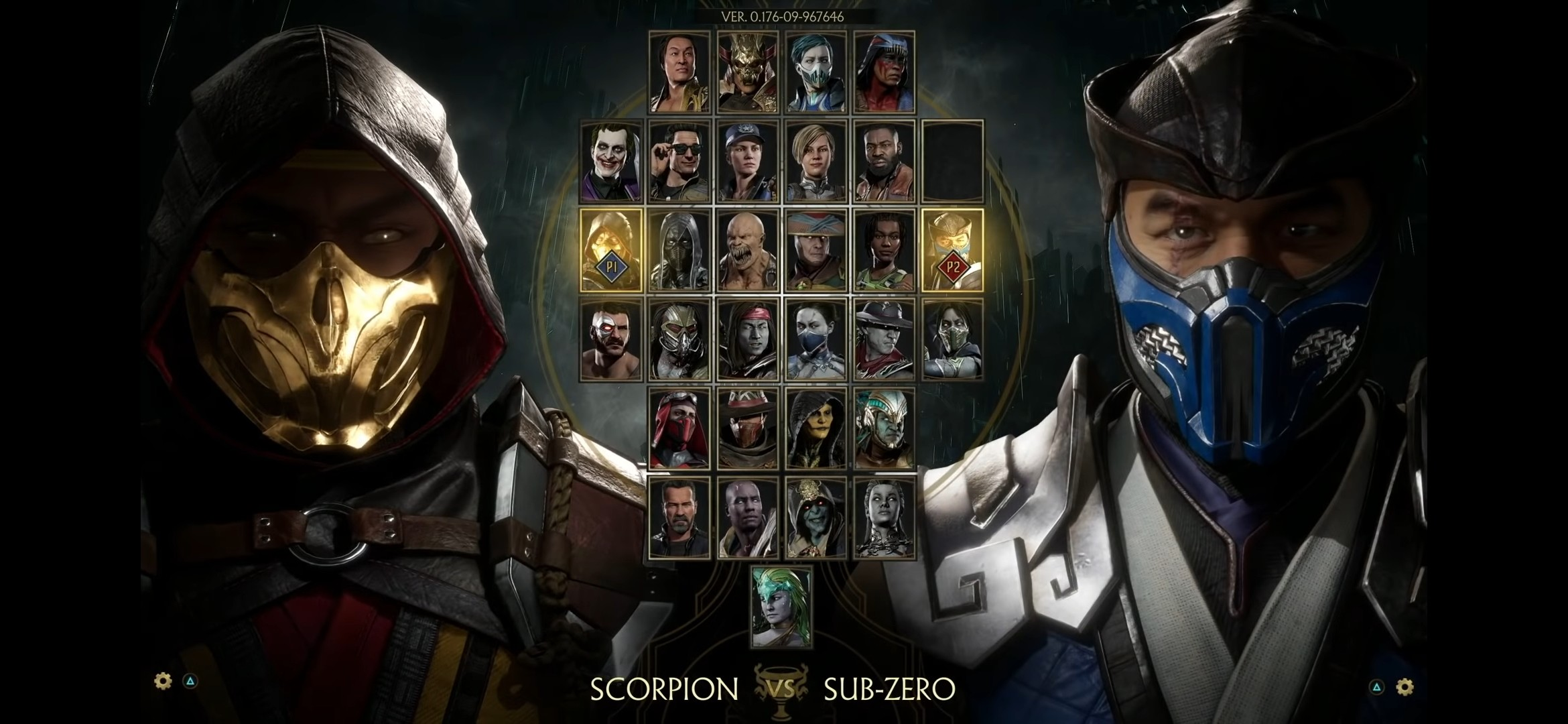
The character selection screen in Mortal Kombat 11 (with Kombat Pack 1 characters)

The game's roster consists of a total of 37 playable characters: 25 characters in the base game (2 of which are unlockable) and 12 characters available via DLC (5 of which are guest characters). The characters in bold are new to the series, while the italicized ones are guest characters.

Base Roster	DLC
Baraka; Cassie Cage; **Cetrion**; D'Vorah; Erron Black; Frost (Note: Unlockable by completing Chapter 4 in Story Mode or via online purchase.); **Geras**; Jacqui Briggs; Jade; Jax Briggs; Johnny Cage; Kabal; Kano; Kitana; **Kollector**; Kotal Kahn; Kung Lao; Liu Kang; Noob Saibot; Raiden; Scorpion; Shao Kahn (Note: Available as a preorder bonus, and later via online purchase.); Skarlet; Sonya Blade; Sub-Zero	**Kombat Pack 1**: The Joker; Nightwolf; Shang Tsung; Sindel; Spawn; The Terminator; **Aftermath**: Fujin; RoboCop; Sheeva; **Kombat Pack 2**: John Rambo; Mileena; Rain

Along with series veterans such as Kano, Raiden, Scorpion, Sonya Blade and Sub-Zero, and others such as Skarlet, who returns from the 2011 reboot, four new fighters were introduced, three of whom are playable. Triborg, who was only a DLC character in Mortal Kombat X, returned to the base roster in the game after 2011. Firstly, Kronika serves as the series's first-ever female boss character, who has powers over the flow of time, and had been supervising the events of the timelines since the very beginning of the events in the overall Mortal Kombat story. She is not among the game's playable characters. New playable fighters include Geras, a construct of Kronika who, like her, has powers that allow him to control the flow of time, and produce sand-based attacks; Cetrion, an Elder Goddess who is Shinnok's sister and Kronika's daughter and has control over elemental forces; and Kollector, a six-armed Naknadan who serves as a tribute collector to the Outworld empire.

Non-playable characters appearing in the game include Shinnok, who appears in the intro to the story mode and in one of the stages (albeit only his head); Sektor and Cyrax, who also appear in the story mode as NPC opponents. However, players can access the variations of Cyrax, Sektor and Smoke through Triborg by customizations and can unlock some of their abilities; Ermac, Reptile and Smoke, who all appear in the gameplay as part of Shang Tsung's moveset, as well as one of Rain's fatalities; and Kintaro, who appears in one of Shang Tsung's fatalities.

== Development ==
Mortal Kombat 11 was developed by NetherRealm Studios and published by Warner Bros. Interactive Entertainment, the two parties also involved with the game's predecessor, Mortal Kombat X. The game was announced by series co-creator Ed Boon in December 2018, at The Game Awards 2018, with a trailer showcasing Dark Raiden and Scorpion fighting against each other. At the end of the announcement trailer it was announced that pre-order buyers would have Shao Kahn available as a playable character. The trailer featured "Immortal", an original song by artist 21 Savage. On January 17, 2019, a community reveal event was held simultaneously in Los Angeles and London. The reveal event featured, among many others, a filmed interview with Ronda Rousey, the voice actress for Sonya Blade. On March 22, 2019, about a month before the game's release, it was announced at C2E2 that actor Cary-Hiroyuki Tagawa would reprise his role as Shang Tsung from the 1995 film and the second season of Mortal Kombat: Legacy, while coinciding the announcement of the character as downloadable content. A public stress test of the game's online mode took place between March 15 and 17. Also, a closed beta was available between March 27 and April 1, 2019, for PlayStation 4 and Xbox One pre-order buyers. During the 2019 Brasil Game Show, Ed Boon announced that the story mode of Mortal Kombat 11 served as a conclusion to the saga that started since the first Mortal Kombat title and the storyline that was established in the 2011 reboot. It used the Unreal Engine 3. The Nintendo Switch version was developed by Shiver Entertainment while the Windows version was developed by QLOC.

== Marketing and release ==
The game was released on April 23, 2019, across Microsoft Windows, Nintendo Switch, PlayStation 4, and Xbox One, with a Stadia port releasing later in the year on November 19, 2019. On March 22, 2022, almost three years after the game's release, a patch was released for the PC version, removing the Denuvo Anti-Tamper from it, among other minor changes. McFarlane Toys produced a line of action figures to promote the game.

The physical release of Mortal Kombat 11: Aftermath, released in June 2020, was the final game published under the WB Games label, following the corporate rebrand of Warner Bros. in 2019. Mortal Kombat 11: Ultimate, released the same year as the Aftermath DLC, was published under the Warner Bros. Games label, and used the shield logo designed by Pentagram, first introduced in 2019, replacing the WB Games logo used since 2010.

=== Downloadable content ===
At C2E2 on March 22, 2019, Shang Tsung was announced as the first downloadable character, who was returning from the 2011 reboot. The character featured the voice and likeness of Cary-Hiroyuki Tagawa, who portrayed him in the 1995 Mortal Kombat film and the second season of Mortal Kombat: Legacy. On May 31, 2019, five additional fighters were announced to be released under the first Kombat Pack with Shang Tsung. Three of the confirmed characters were Nightwolf and Sindel, both returning from the 2011 Mortal Kombat game, and Spawn from Image Comics by Todd McFarlane, as a guest character with Keith David reprising the title role from the HBO animated series Todd McFarlane's Spawn. In February 2015, McFarlane had granted NetherRealm a limited window of permission to use Spawn as a guest character for their titles. However, in April 2015, Ed Boon revealed that Spawn had been discussed as a potential guest character early in development, but that he did not know McFarlane had made the offer until after the release of Mortal Kombat X. Leading up to a Reddit AMA in December 2018 where McFarlane hinted that Spawn would be in Mortal Kombat 11. The gameplay trailer featuring Spawn was released on March 8, 2020, during the "Final Kombat" tournament, where David attended the event as a guest alongside the debut of the red band trailer for the animated film Mortal Kombat Legends: Scorpion's Revenge.

On August 21, the remaining two guest characters were revealed as the Terminator from the Terminator franchise and the Joker from DC Comics, marking his return to the series after Mortal Kombat vs DC Universe and being a playable character in the Injustice series, with voice actor Richard Epcar reprising the role from both. As a tie-in release to Terminator: Dark Fate, the Terminator's facial likeness and capture were provided by Arnold Schwarzenegger, with the character voiced by Chris Cox, who was appointed by Schwarzenegger himself. In a December 2015 interview, Ed Boon revealed that like Spawn, the Terminator had been considered as a guest character for Mortal Kombat X. The reveal for the Joker's design was met with negative reception, generating a wave of online fans comparing it to a poor cosplay. A teaser trailer later debuted on December 12, 2019, revealed that the Joker had a redesign due to the initial backlash back in August. The redesign for the Joker was later well-received, citing improvement on his facial features as opposed to the initial reveal. Ed Boon initially described the presence of the Joker as "Vicious", in contrast to his previous appearances that were toned down in both Injustice games and Mortal Kombat vs. DC Universe in order to secure the T rating. Another teaser was uploaded on New Year's Day 2020, featuring the character's trademark graffiti and smiling on the walls of Arkham Asylum during fireworks, followed by laughter. Two weeks later, Boon later posted a gameplay image of the Joker covered in blood through his Twitter account, promising a taste of things to come for the character's inclusion. The gameplay trailer was released two days later on January 16, 2020, showcasing the Joker's new moveset and gruesome Fatality.

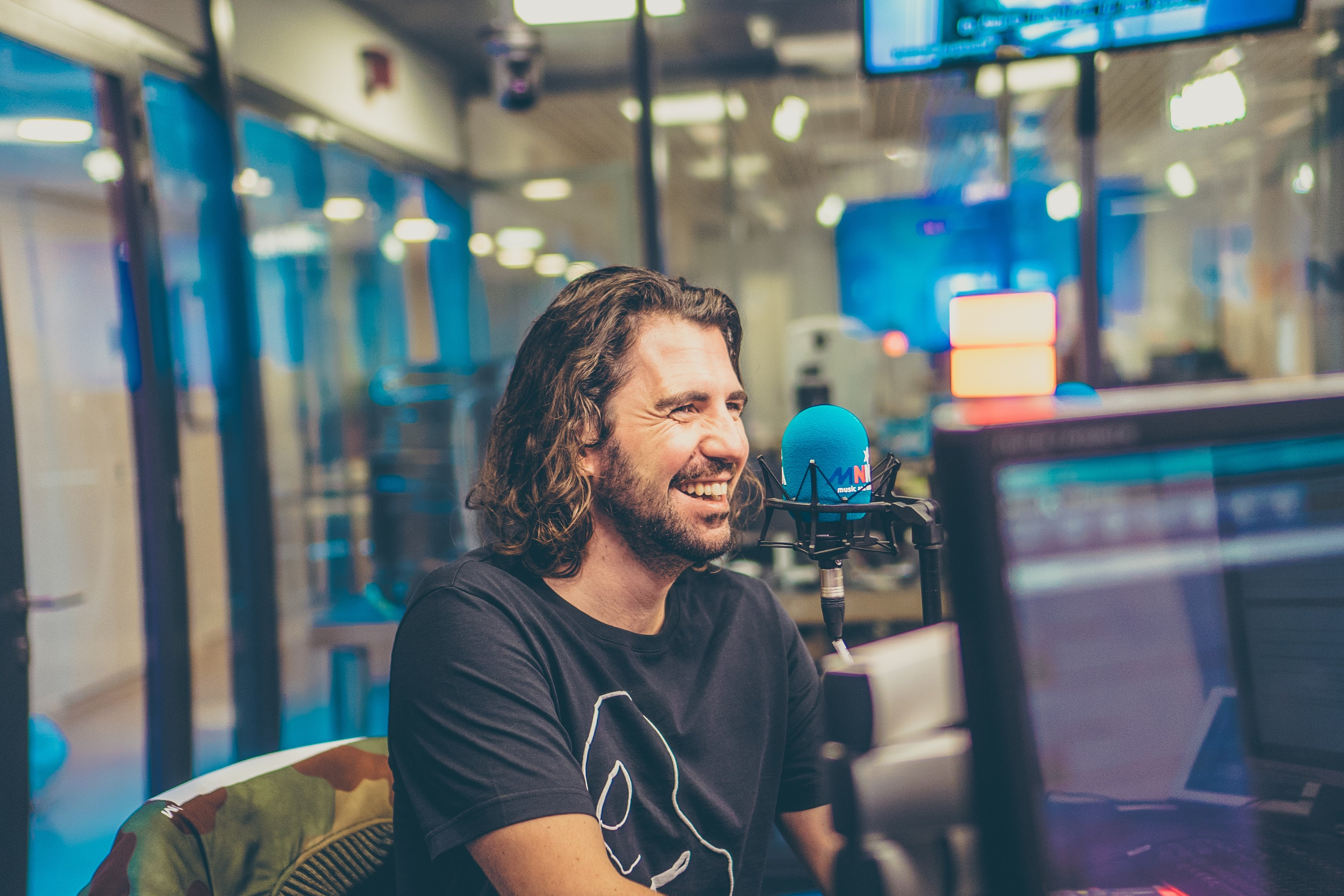
DJ Dimitri Vegas provided his voice and likeness for a Sub-Zero skin.

Like Mortal Kombat X, Mortal Kombat 11 received skin packs included in the Kombat Pack, normally consisting of three character skins per pack, with a total of eighteen skins all together. A small number of single skins were released for free such as a Harley Quinn-inspired skin for Cassie Cage and a Dimitri Vegas skin for Sub-Zero, featuring Vegas himself providing the voice for the skin as Sub-Zero. During the Summer of 2019, two Klassic skin packs were released in a period of two months, consisting of a Klassic Ninja skin pack in June and a Klassic Arcade Fighter skin pack in August 2019. In October 2019, a Double Feature skin pack was released while a Halloween skin pack was released for free. In November 2019, a Gothic horror skin pack was released. In January 2020, an Elseworlds-themed skin pack was announced to be released with the Joker alongside a Darkseid skin for Geras. In March 2020, a Matinee skin pack was released with Spawn including a "Hellspawn" themed skin for Jacqui Briggs.

On May 5, 2020, a new story mode DLC was teased, to be announced the following day. This DLC was revealed to be titled Aftermath and together with new story mode content, it consists of Fujin, who was last playable in Armageddon; Sheeva, who previously appeared as a non playable character in the game's story mode; and an additional guest character, RoboCop, with actor Peter Weller reprising his role for the first time since RoboCop 2. Three additional skin packs were announced in July 2020 as part of the post Aftermath launch, which were released between August and September 2020.

On October 6, 2020, a teaser trailer for an additional DLC pack was uploaded, promising more information on October 8. This was revealed to be Kombat Pack 2, consisting of three playable characters: Mileena, who was last playable in Mortal Kombat X; Rain, who was last playable in the 2011 reboot via DLC; and an additional guest character, John Rambo from the Rambo franchise, with original actor Sylvester Stallone providing his voice and likeness. Kombat Pack 2, along with all previous downloadable content, is included as part of the game's enhanced Ultimate re-release. To work around the COVID-19 pandemic, Stallone recorded his dialogue at his home, through Zoom conference calls with the Netherrealm staff. Mileena's inclusion in Kombat Pack 2 was due to high demand from fans in the wake of her absence in the game previously. Ed Boon revealed that the motivation for her exclusion from the base game was that the team wanted to "create an appreciation" for the character, after getting constant replies from fans on social media demanding her return. An enhanced version of the game with all downloadable content included, titled Mortal Kombat 11: Ultimate, was released on November 17, 2020, for the PlayStation 4, PlayStation 5, Xbox One, and Xbox Series X/S. A "Klassic MK Movie" skin pack was released on November 24, 2020, adding new skins for Johnny Cage, Sonya Blade and Raiden using the respective voices and likenesses of Linden Ashby, Bridgette Wilson, and Christopher Lambert, who portrayed them in the 1995 Mortal Kombat film.

On July 2, 2021, NetherRealm Studios announced that Mortal Kombat 11 would no longer receive DLC and update support, and that they would instead be focusing on their next projects, Mortal Kombat 1 and Mortal Kombat: Onslaught.

== Related media ==
In February 2019, the mobile game that had originally been launched as Mortal Kombat X for iOS and Android, was renamed to Mortal Kombat Mobile as it received its 2.0 update, incorporating Mortal Kombat 11 content in the process. Among these changes, the graphics engine was transitioned from Unreal Engine 3 to Unreal Engine 4. The app is available on App Store and Google Play, with 50 million downloads in the latter.

== Reception ==
=== Critical reception ===
Reception

Aggregate score
Aggregator	Score
Metacritic	82/100 (PS4); 86/100 (XONE); 82/100 (PC); 78/100 (NS); 88/100 (PS5); 88/100 (XBSX)

Review scores
Publication	Score
Destructoid	7/10
GameSpot	9/10
GamesRadar+	4/5
IGN	9/10
Jeuxvideo.com	18/20
PC Gamer (US)	85/100
Metro	8/10
Push Square	7/10
PC World	3.5/5

Mortal Kombat 11 received generally favorable reviews according to the review aggregator website Metacritic. IGN praised the more slow-paced combat compared to the previous game in the series, as well as the expanded tutorial, story mode and improved netcode. However, it condemned the game's drawn-out progression and customization unlock system, which was described as "frustratingly gimmicky and grindy". GameSpot gave the game a 9, praising the fighting system calling it "accessible, deep and exciting" as well praising the story mode. However, they criticized the "always-online requirement for progression" as well as the randomization of rewards in the Krypt.

The Nintendo Switch version of the game was also well received. Pure Nintendo gave the game a 9, praising the game's story mode, customization mode, and the game's tutorials, though stated that the online features are where the Nintendo Switch version "falls short". Nintendo Life gave the game an 8 out of 10, praising the game on its features, though it was critical on the game's graphics, stating that "it's a performance-first experience that nails 60fps, and boasts every mode and mechanic from other versions, only with a noticeable downgrade in the aesthetics department".

=== Sales ===
In North America, Mortal Kombat 11 was the best-selling video game software for the month of April. This, along with Fortnite, contributed to digital game sales reaching over $8.8 billion in April. In June 2019, Mortal Kombat 11 surpassed the sales of Kingdom Hearts III. Mortal Kombat 11 proceeded to be the best-selling video game software in North America for the following month of May, for both Xbox One and PlayStation 4, the sales of the game is nearly doubled comparably to previous entries of the series. In May 2019, the game reached number 1 in Australia, and number 2 in New Zealand. It reached number 2 in Switzerland. It was the 4th most downloaded game on the European PlayStation Store charts in April 2019.

Overall, Mortal Kombat 11 was the fifth best selling game of 2019 and the fourth best selling PS4 game of 2019. By 2022, the game had sold more than 15 million copies worldwide, making it the best-selling game in the Mortal Kombat franchise.

=== Awards ===
Year	Award	Category	Result	Ref.
2019	2019 Golden Joystick Awards	Best Storytelling	Nominated	
2019	2019 Golden Joystick Awards	Best Multiplayer Game	Nominated	
2019	The Game Awards 2019	Best Fighting Game	Nominated	
2019	Steam Awards 2019	The "Best Game You Suck At" Award	Won	
2020	23rd Annual D.I.C.E. Awards	Fighting Game of the Year	Won	
2020	23rd Annual D.I.C.E. Awards	Outstanding Achievement in Audio Design	Nominated	
2020	23rd Annual D.I.C.E. Awards	Outstanding Achievement in Original Music Composition	Nominated	
2020	NAVGTR Awards	Game, Franchise Fighting	Nominated	
2020	SXSW Gaming Awards	Excellence in Animation	Nominated	
2020	SXSW Gaming Awards	Excellence in Multiplayer	Nominated	
2020	SXSW Gaming Awards	Excellence in SFX	Nominated	
2020	18th Annual G.A.N.G. Awards	Audio of the Year	Nominated	
2020	18th Annual G.A.N.G. Awards	Sound Design of the Year	Nominated	
2020	18th Annual G.A.N.G. Awards	Best Original Instrumental	Nominated	
2020	The Game Awards 2020	Best Fighting Game (Ultimate version)	Won	
2021	24th Annual D.I.C.E. Awards	Fighting Game of the Year (Ultimate version)	Won	

== Controversies ==
Due to its violence and gore, Mortal Kombat 11 is banned in Japan, South Korea, Indonesia, and China. It was also banned in Ukraine because of the laws banning Communist symbols. Some of these symbols are present on the "Kollection" images and on the bonus costume of character Skarlet, which was also part of the MK11 Premium Edition.

Mortal Kombat 11 also received heavy backlash from members of the Mortal Kombat fanbase for drastically cutting back on the sex appeal of its female characters. Creator Ed Boon, in an interview with Playboy, claimed it was "unrealistic" for female fighters to be scantily clad and thought that the 2011 Mortal Kombat had "gone too far in its sexualization".

In 2019, a Mortal Kombat 11 developer revealed to Kotaku that some of the team members were diagnosed with post-traumatic stress disorder (PTSD) because of exposure to excess graphic violence. Developers used real gore videos and images as an inspiration for the game's gore imagery. Source material such as beheading videos and pictures of murder victims as well as slaughtered animals were viewed amongst the staff and some members of the team were said to suffer nightmares as a result. The studio was also accused of instituting "crunch culture", with employees regularly working 80 to 100 hours a week to meet submission deadlines.

In January 2021, a Mortal Kombat 11 Pro Kompetition finalist, Titaniumtigerzz, was disqualified for naming his Sheeva variation 'WhyDidNRSdoThis'. The name "was supposed to be a very mild criticism of Sheeva's strengths" according to the player.

== Sequel ==
In February 2023, Warner Bros. Discovery CEO David Zaslav announced during a 2022 fourth-quarter earnings call that a twelfth installment in the series is set to be released later in that year, later to be revealed to be Mortal Kombat 1. Mortal Kombat 1's Kollector and Premium editions released on September 14, 2023, and the Standard edition released on September 19 of the same year. The sequel received very positive reviews (with the exception of the Switch version, which was received negatively).
