= Mortal Kombat (2021 film) =

2021 film by Simon McQuoid

- Theatrical release poster
- Directed by: Simon McQuoid
- Screenplay by: Greg Russo; David Callaham
- Story by: Oren Uziel; Greg Russo
- Based on: Mortal Kombat by: Ed Boon; John Tobias
- Produced by: James Wan; Todd Garner; Simon McQuoid; E. Bennett Walsh
- Starring: Lewis Tan; Jessica McNamee; Josh Lawson; Tadanobu Asano; Mehcad Brooks; Ludi Lin; Chin Han; Joe Taslim; Hiroyuki Sanada
- Cinematography: Germain McMicking
- Edited by: Dan Lebental; Scott Gray
- Music by: Benjamin Wallfisch
- Production companies: New Line Cinema; Atomic Monster; Broken Road Productions
- Distributed by: Warner Bros. Pictures
- Release dates: April 8, 2021 (international); April 23, 2021 (United States)
- Running time: 110 minutes
- Country: United States
- Language: English
- Budget: $55 million
- Box office: $84.4 million

Mortal Kombat is a 2021 American martial arts dark fantasy film based on the video-game series created by Ed Boon and John Tobias. The film serves as a reboot and is the third installment in the Mortal Kombat film series. Directed by Simon McQuoid from a screenplay by Greg Russo and David Callaham, it stars Lewis Tan, Jessica McNamee, Josh Lawson, Tadanobu Asano, Mehcad Brooks, Ludi Lin, Chin Han, Max Huang, Joe Taslim, and Hiroyuki Sanada. The film follows Cole Young, a washed-up mixed martial arts fighter who discovers he is among a group of fighters chosen to defend Earthrealm against malevolent forces from Outworld in the eponymous Mortal Kombat tournament.

Following the critical and commercial failure of Mortal Kombat Annihilation (1997), a third Mortal Kombat film languished in development hell for a period of nearly two decades. In late 2010, Warner Bros. Pictures and New Line Cinema began developing a new film, with Kevin Tancharoen serving as director from a script written by Oren Uziel in the wake of their short film Mortal Kombat: Rebirth (2010). James Wan was announced as a producer in August 2015 and McQuoid was hired as director in November 2016. Production took place at Adelaide Studios in Adelaide and at other locations in South Australia. Principal photography occurred from September to December 2019.

Mortal Kombat was released internationally on April 8, 2021, and in the United States on April 23, simultaneously in theaters in Dolby Cinema, IMAX, and 4DX formats and on the streaming service HBO Max. The film received mixed reviews from critics, who praised the performances, production values, action sequences, and faithfulness to the source material as compared to the previous films, but criticized its screenplay and exposition. The film grossed over $84 million against a $55 million production budget and became HBO Max's most successful film launch to date.

A sequel, Mortal Kombat II, was released on May 8, 2026, also directed by McQuoid and written by Jeremy Slater.

== Plot ==
In Japan in 1617, Hanzo Hasashi returns from collecting water to find his wife and son frozen to death, his home ransacked, and his allies, the Shirai Ryu ninja clan, slaughtered by the Chinese Lin Kuei assassin clan, led by cryomancer Bi-Han. After killing the attackers, Hanzo fights Bi-Han but is mortally wounded. He dies attempting to reach his hidden infant daughter, after telling Bi-Han to remember his face, and his soul is condemned to the Netherrealm. Lord Raiden, god of Thunder, later takes Hanzo's daughter to safety.

By 2021, Outworld has defeated Earthrealm in nine tournaments known as "Mortal Kombat." If Earthrealm loses a tenth tournament, Outworld will conquer it. An ancient prophecy foretells that the "blood of Hanzo Hasashi" will unite a new generation of Earthrealm champions and prevent Outworld's victory. To stop them before the tournament begins, Outworld sorcerer Shang Tsung sends his warriors to eliminate Earthrealm's champions, who are identified by a dragon mark.

Meanwhile, MMA fighter Cole Young and his family are attacked by Bi-Han, now known as Sub-Zero. Special Forces Major Jackson "Jax" Briggs rescues them and directs Cole to find his partner, Sonya Blade, while he stays behind to fight Sub-Zero. Sub-Zero freezes and destroys Jax's arms. Cole finds Sonya, who is interrogating Australian mercenary Kano about Mortal Kombat. The group is attacked by Shang Tsung's reptilian assassin, Syzoth, which scars Kano's right eye before they kill it together.

They travel to Raiden's temple, where they meet Earthrealm champions Liu Kang, Kung Lao, and Raiden, who distrusts the newcomers. Jax is also there, having been rescued by Raiden and fitted with mechanical arms. Shang Tsung attempts to invade the temple but is blocked by Raiden's protective shield. Cole and Kano train with Liu Kang and Kung Lao to awaken their "arcana," unique powers possessed by dragon mark bearers. During an argument, Kano discovers that his arcana allows him to fire lasers from his scarred eye. Cole, however, cannot awaken his powers. Disappointed, Raiden sends him home and reveals that he is a descendant of Hanzo.

Shang Tsung assembles his warriors, including Kano's former ally, Kabal, to attack the temple. Kabal persuades Kano to defect and sabotage the shield in exchange for great wealth. During the ensuing battle, Jax awakens his arcana, gaining superhuman strength and enhanced cybernetic arms. Meanwhile, Cole's family is attacked by Prince Goro. Cole finally awakens his arcana, gaining armor that absorbs kinetic energy from physical attacks and a pair of tonfa. He kills Goro and helps repel the temple attack. As Raiden transports the Earthrealm fighters to the Void, a safe space between realms, Sub-Zero pursues Cole. Kung Lao saves Cole, but Shang Tsung kills Kung Lao by taking his soul.

Cole proposes that the champions confront Outworld's warriors individually before joining forces against Sub-Zero. Raiden approves and gives Cole Hanzo's kunai, which still bears his blood. He then transports Cole and the others to their opponents. Sonya kills Kano and acquires his dragon mark, gaining the ability to fire energy blasts from her arms, which she uses to kill Mileena. Liu Kang kills Kabal, while Jax defeats Shang Tsung's general, Reiko.

Sub-Zero abducts Cole's family and freezes them to force Cole into a one-on-one fight. Overpowered, Cole uses the kunai to release Hanzo's blood and summon him as the vengeful specter Scorpion. Recognizing Cole as his descendant, Scorpion helps him kill Sub-Zero and rescue his family. After thanking Cole for freeing him and asking him to protect the Hasashi bloodline, Scorpion departs. Raiden, the surviving champions, and Shang Tsung arrive, while Liu Kang warms Cole's family.

Shang Tsung threatens to return with armies rather than individual fighters. Raiden banishes him and declares his intention to train new warriors for the next tournament, assigning the champions to recruit them. Cole leaves for Los Angeles to seek martial arts film star Johnny Cage.

== Cast ==
- Lewis Tan as Cole Young
- Jessica McNamee as Sonya Blade
- Josh Lawson as Kano
- Joe Taslim as Bi-Han / Sub-Zero
- Mehcad Brooks as Jax
- Matilda Kimber as Emily Young
- Laura Brent as Allison Young
- Tadanobu Asano as Raiden
- Hiroyuki Sanada as Hanzo Hasashi / Scorpion
- Chin Han as Shang Tsung
- Ludi Lin as Liu Kang
- Max Huang as Kung Lao
- Sisi Stringer as Mileena
- Mel Jarnson as Nitara
- Nathan Jones as Reiko
- Daniel Nelson as Kabal
  - Damon Herriman as the voice of Kabal
- Angus Sampson as Goro (voice)

== Production ==
=== Development ===
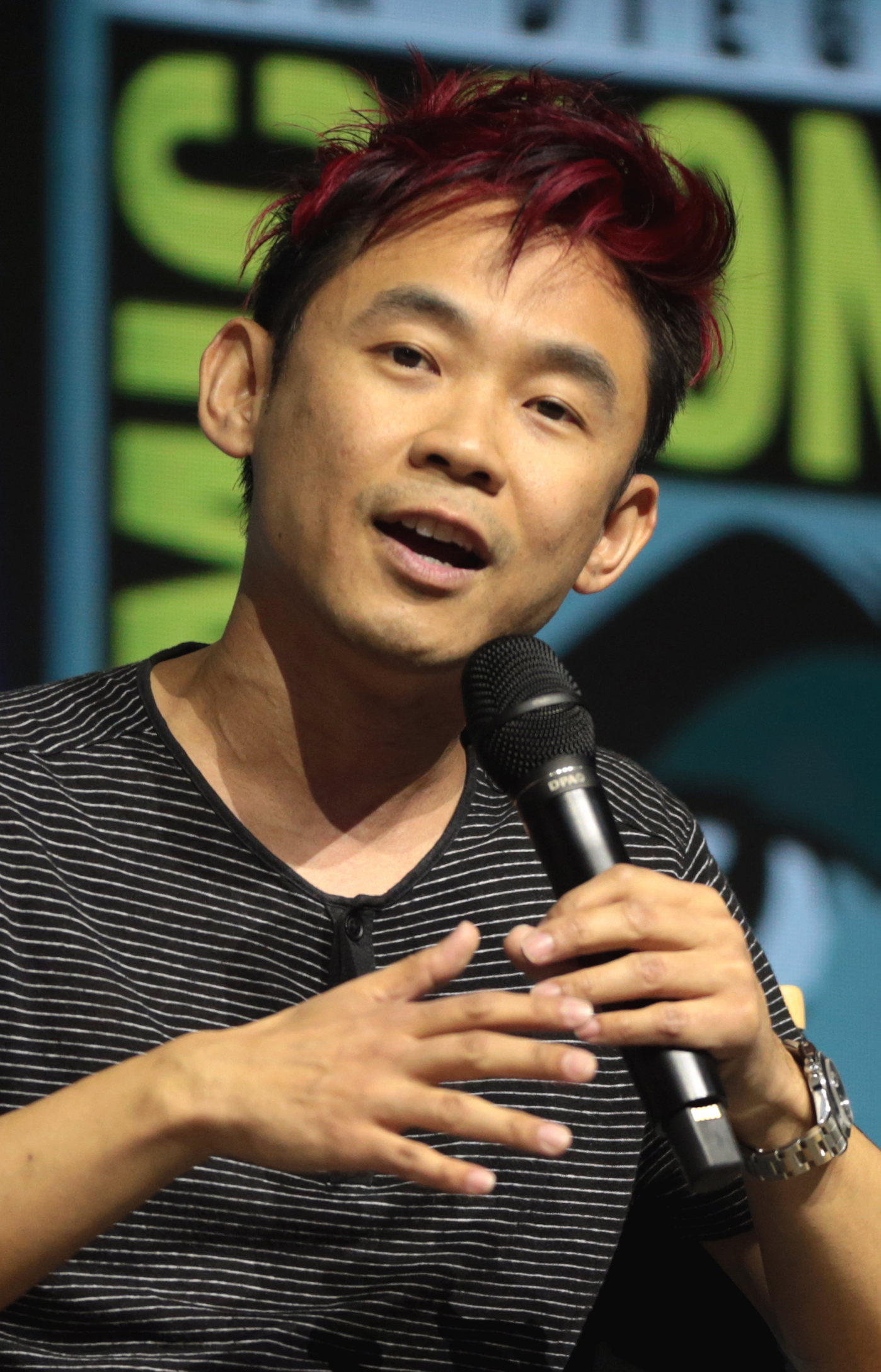
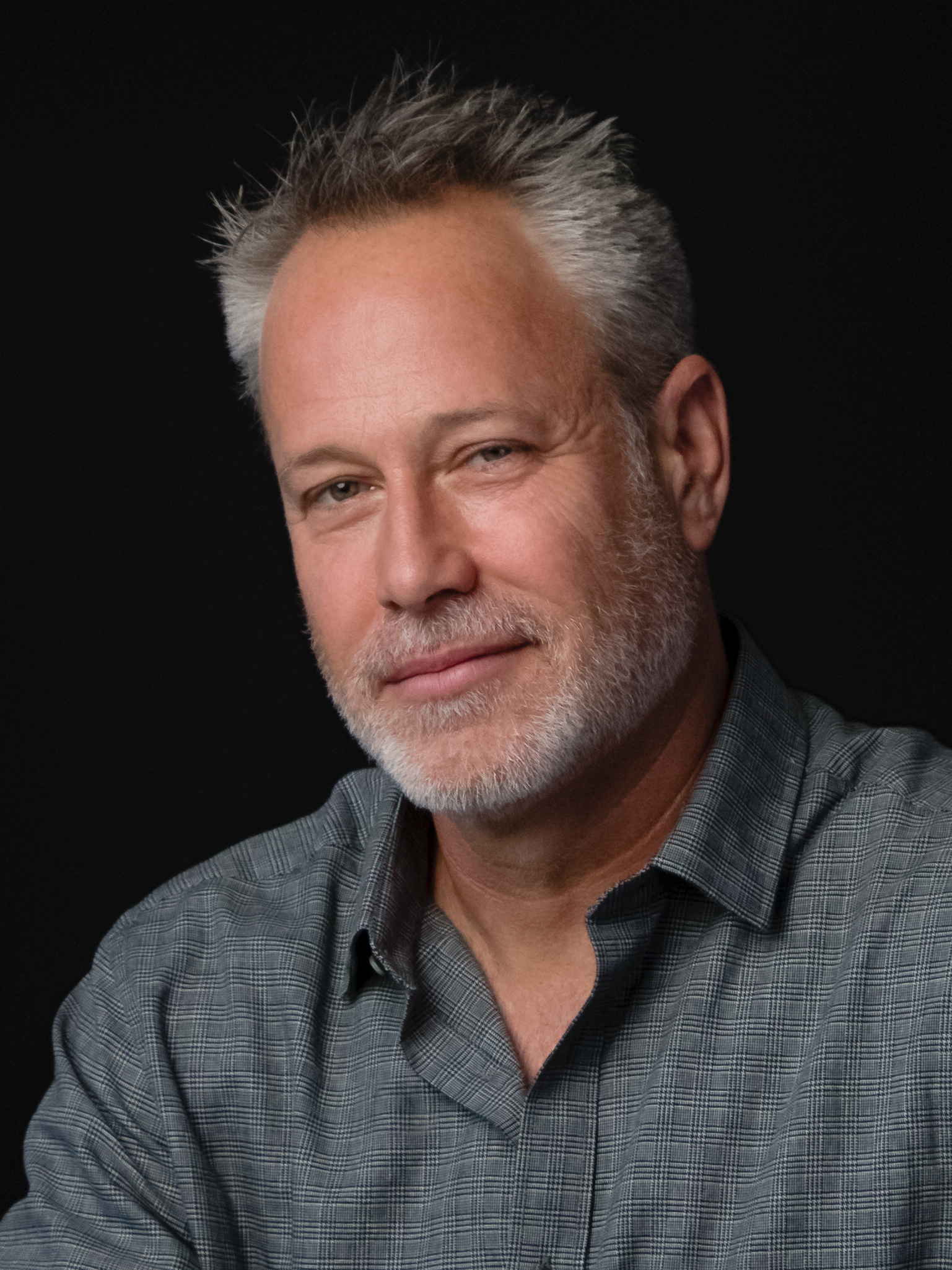
James Wan and Todd Garner (both shown above) serve as producers for the reboot along with E. Bennett Walsh and director Simon McQuoid.

In 1997, Robin Shou's original Mortal Kombat contract was a three-picture deal, and Threshold Entertainment's production on a second sequel was initially scheduled to commence shortly after the release of Annihilation, but it was shelved due to Annihilation's poor reception and disappointing box-office performance. Attempts to produce a third film since then were stuck in development hell with numerous script rewrites and storyline, cast, and crew changes. A November 2001 poll on the official Mortal Kombat website hosted by Threshold asked fans which characters they believed would die in the third movie. The 2005 destruction of New Orleans by Hurricane Katrina greatly affected one of the film's planned shooting locations. In June 2009, a bankruptcy court lawsuit saw Lawrence Kasanoff suing Midway Games while mentioning that a third film was in the works. Warner Bros. Pictures (which became the parent of New Line Cinema in 2008, after over a decade of both operating as separate divisions of Time Warner) ended up purchasing most of Midway's assets, including Mortal Kombat.

In 2010, director Kevin Tancharoen released an eight-minute short film titled Mortal Kombat: Rebirth, made as a pitch to Warner Bros. Pictures of a reboot of the Mortal Kombat film franchise. In September 2011, New Line Cinema and Warner Bros. announced that Tancharoen was hired to direct a new feature-length film from a screenplay by Mortal Kombat: Rebirth writer Oren Uziel, with the intention of aiming for an R rating. Shooting was expected to begin in March 2012 with a budget projected at between $40–50 million and a release date of 2013. However, the project was ultimately delayed due to budget constraints, and Tancharoen began working on the second season of the web series Mortal Kombat: Legacy until problems with the film had been sorted out, but he quit the film production in October 2013.

James Wan signed on as the film's producer in August 2015. Simon McQuoid was hired as director in November 2016, marking his feature directorial debut, with Greg Russo writing the script. McQuoid had turned down the offer initially, but ultimately signed on after reading Russo's script. Russo tweeted in February 2019 that the film's script was complete. In May 2019, it was announced that the film had entered pre-production and would be shot in South Australia, with a release date of March 5, 2021. Russo tweeted in July 2019 that the film would indeed have an R rating and that the games' Fatalities would "finally be on the big screen".

In April 2021, McQuoid revealed that the film came "quite close to the line" of getting an NC-17 rating by the Motion Picture Association, saying in full, "What we had to be a bit careful of was... you can get to NC-17 territory pretty quick. It's different in a video game when it's not real human beings. When you move this across to reality, a different set of things start to happen in your mind, and you get rated slightly differently. So there were certain things that are in the game that would mean the film would be unreleasable. And none of us wanted that. … So we were balancing that stuff all the time. And there's some stuff that you will see that really gets quite close to the line because we didn't want people to go, 'Meh. Seemed kind of lame.'" Ultimately, after some edits, the film received its intended R rating.

=== Casting ===
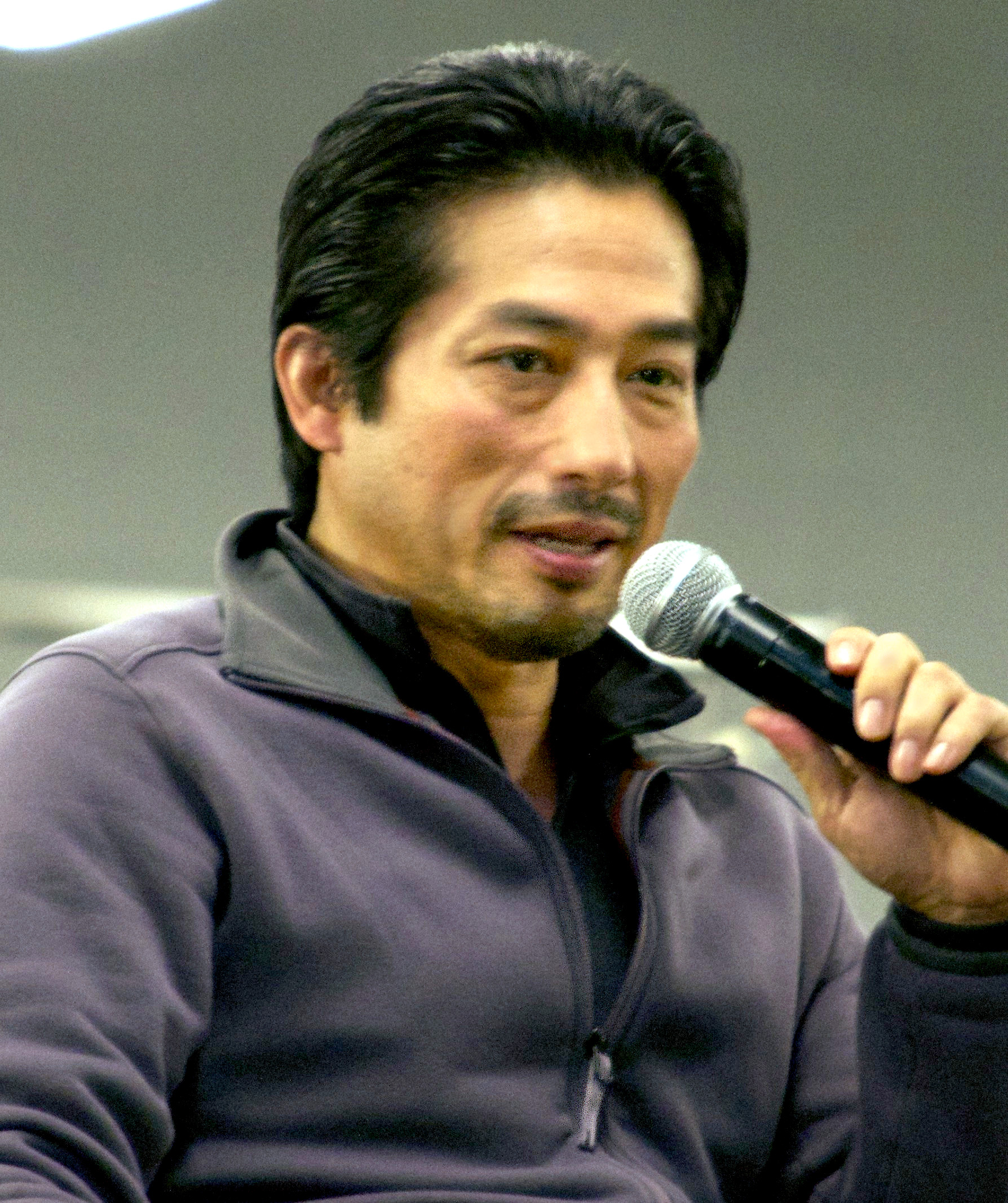
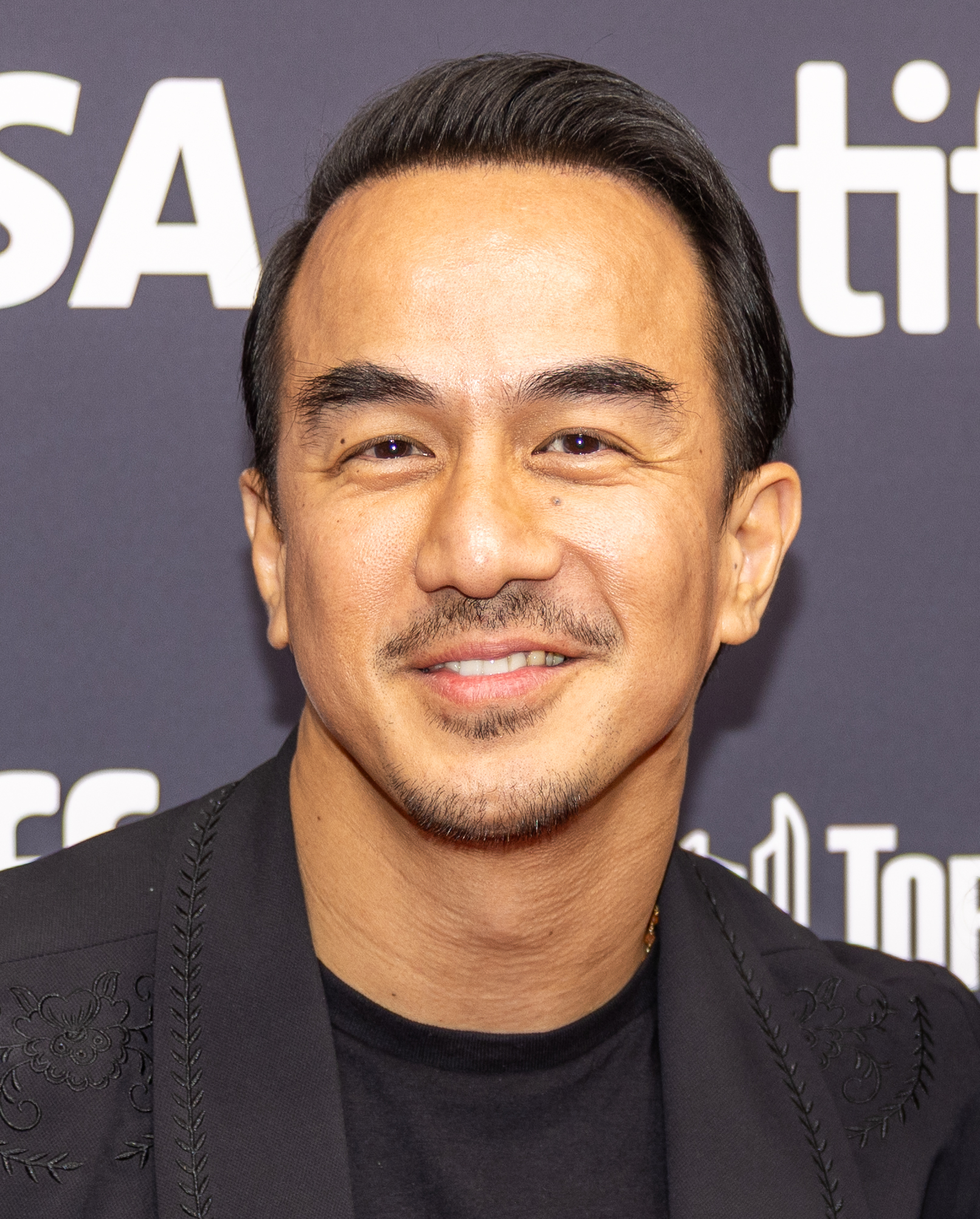
Hiroyuki Sanada and Joe Taslim were cast as Scorpion and Sub-Zero respectively.

Joe Taslim was the first actor cast for the production in July 2019, as Sub-Zero. In August, Mehcad Brooks, Tadanobu Asano, Sisi Stringer, and Ludi Lin were cast in the roles of Jax Briggs, Raiden, Mileena, and Liu Kang respectively. Later that month, Josh Lawson, Jessica McNamee, Chin Han and Hiroyuki Sanada were cast as Kano, Sonya Blade, Shang Tsung and Scorpion respectively, with Lewis Tan in the role of Cole Young, an original character created for the film. On September 16, 2019, it was announced that Max Huang had been cast as Kung Lao. Stuntwoman Elissa Cadwell was announced as having been cast as Nitara on November 11, 2019, but she was later replaced by Mel Jarnson. Matilda Kimber was cast as Emily on December 4, 2019.

=== Filming ===
Production took place at Adelaide Studios and other locations in South Australia, lasting from September 16 to December 13, 2019. In November 2020, Todd Garner stated that "we have more days to shoot" in a statement regarding the film's release delay. The film was shot on the ARRI ALEXA LF and Mini LF cameras with Panavision Anamorphic lenses.

=== Visual effects ===
Rising Sun Pictures (RSP), an Adelaide company, was principal VFX provider, delivering over 600 visual effects shots for the film. The studio's artists also created the effects for the last scene, a furious fight lasting around 10 minutes. RSP won an AEAF Special Merit Award in 2021 for their work on the film.

== Music ==
The score for Mortal Kombat was composed by Benjamin Wallfisch. In March 2021, director Simon McQuoid revealed that Wallfisch actually began compositions for the film before he was officially hired on the project and that the film will include a new version of the track "Techno Syndrome" by The Immortals, produced by Wallfisch.

== Release ==
=== Marketing ===
On January 15, 2021, which was when the film was initially set to release prior to being delayed due to the COVID-19 pandemic, Entertainment Weekly released a first look of the film, which contained several behind the scenes photos. On February 17, 2021, a series of character posters were released for the film, along with the next announcement that the film's first trailer would be released the following day. On February 18, 2021, the first red band trailer for the film was released online. The film's first trailer had become the most-watched red-band trailer until the release of the first trailer of The Suicide Squad a month later.

=== Theatrical and streaming ===
Mortal Kombat was theatrically released internationally, beginning on April 8, 2021, and was later released in the United States on April 23, 2021, in both theaters in Dolby Cinema, IMAX and 4DX and on HBO Max. The film was originally going to be released on March 5, 2021, before being moved up to January 15, 2021. In November 2020, producer Todd Garner confirmed that the film would be delayed until theaters are reopened due to the COVID-19 pandemic, before it was finally dated for release on April 16 in 3D. As part of its plans for all of its 2021 films, Warner Bros. also streamed the film simultaneously on the HBO Max service for one month, after which the film was removed until the normal home media release schedule period. In Australia and New Zealand, the film was released onto Netflix in January 2022, due to HBO Max not being available in either country at the time.

In late March 2021, the film was delayed one week to April 23. The film was released in Japan on June 18, 2021, despite the Mortal Kombat games not having been released officially in that country due to CERO gaming rules concerning excessive gore.

=== Home media ===
Mortal Kombat was released on Digital HD on June 11, 2021, and on DVD, Blu-ray and Ultra HD Blu-ray by Warner Bros. Home Entertainment on July 13, 2021.

== Reception ==
=== Audience viewership ===
Following its U.S. release, Samba TV reported that 3.8 million households watched at least the first five minutes over its first three days. It was watched in 4.3 million households during its first week and 5.5 million households over the first 17 days, a record for an HBO Max title. By the end of its first month, the film had been streamed in over 5.6 million U.S. households. In January 2022, tech firm Akamai reported that Mortal Kombat was the fifth most pirated film of 2021.

=== Box office ===
Mortal Kombat grossed $42.3 million in the United States and Canada, and $42.1 million in other territories, for a worldwide total of $84.4 million.

Released on April 23, 2021, Mortal Kombat was originally projected to gross $10–12 million in its domestic opening weekend, though the film made $9 million from 3,073 theaters on its first day of release, increasing estimates to $19 million. It went on to debut to $23.3 million, topping the box office. In its second weekend the film dropped 73% to $6.2 million, finishing second behind Demon Slayer: Kimetsu no Yaiba the Movie: Mugen Train ($6.4 million), and $2.4 million in its third weekend.

In its opening international weekend, the film made $10.7 million from 17 countries, with the largest market being Russia ($6.1 million). In its second weekend the film made $5.7 million from 28 countries.

=== Critical response ===
On the review aggregator website Rotten Tomatoes, 55% of 299 critics' reviews are positive, with an average rating of 5.4/10. The website's consensus reads: "Largely for fans of the source material but far from fatal(ity) flawed, Mortal Kombat revives the franchise in appropriately violent fashion." Metacritic, which uses a weighted average, assigned the film a score of 44 out of 100, based on 43 critics, indicating "mixed or average" reviews. Audiences surveyed by CinemaScore gave the film an average grade of "B+" on an A+ to F scale.

Alonso Duralde of the TheWrap wrote: "Viewers interested in martial-arts action are bound to find the combat-with-a-C to be lackluster in that way that hand-to-hand fighting tends to be when it gets drowned out by digital effects. More likely to have fun with this latest Mortal Kombat are Sam Raimi enthusiasts who can appreciate the comedy in over-the-top geysers of fake blood, which the film unleashes with increasing regularity as the fights get more serious." The Hollywood Reporter's John DeFore said the film was "not exactly a knockout" and wrote: "A B-movie that would benefit immensely from some wit in the script and charisma in the cast, it's not as aggressively hacky as P.W.S.A.'s oeuvre, but it runs into problems he didn't face in 1995: namely, the bar has been raised quite a bit for movies in which teams of superpowered young people have fights to save the universe."

Korey Coleman and Martin Thomas of Double Toasted commented that the cast lacked any relatability and furthermore found the character of Cole Young to be a weak and uninteresting protagonist. James Marsh, of the South China Morning Post, gave a positive review, saying, "Director Simon McQuoid understands and honours the film's video game origins, including memorable lines of dialogue and signature fight moves throughout".

Ben Kenigsberg of The New York Times wrote, "The latest screen adaptation of the video game still shows that trying to construct a coherent plot around these characters is a fatal trap". Brian Lowry of CNN gave Mortal Kombat a negative review, writing: "For those on the fence, though, 'Mortal Kombat' is hardly worth starting, much less finishing". Matt Goldberg of Collider wrote, "Simon McQuoid's new adaptation is a mostly joyless slog that can't even deliver exhilarating fights". Benjamin Lee at The Guardian rated the film 2/5, stating "A silly and dated new attempt to transport the classic fighting game to the big screen is a late-night drunk watch at best".

== Sequel ==
Joe Taslim, who played Sub-Zero in the film, revealed that he signed on for four sequels pending the success of the reboot. Co-writer Greg Russo told Collider that he saw the reboot as the start of a trilogy with the second film set during the Mortal Kombat tournament and the third film set post-tournament. On September 14, 2021, Variety reported that Warner Bros. was seeking to develop additional works for its Mortal Kombat universe.

On January 26, 2022, Warner Bros. officially greenlit the sequel, with McQuoid returning as director and Jeremy Slater writing the screenplay. In an interview after the first film's release, McQuoid said that the character of Johnny Cage was not included in the film because the character was a "giant personality" that would throw the film out of balance. While Slater told ComicBook.com that Cage would appear in the sequel, he added that his role therein was currently unknown. Professional wrestler Mike "The Miz" Mizanin openly expressed interest in the part of Cage while receiving support of Mortal Kombat co-creator Ed Boon, but according to Garner, Karl Urban was in final talks for the role. In May 2023, Tati Gabrielle and Adeline Rudolph were cast as Jade and Kitana respectively. In June 2023, it was announced that Martyn Ford, Ana Thu Nguyen, Damon Herriman (not returning as the voice of Kabal) and Desmond Chiam were cast as Shao Kahn, Sindel, Quan Chi and King Jerrod. It was also announced in June that the cast from the first film such as Lewis Tan, Ludi Lin, Tadanobu Asano, Jessica McNamee, Chin Han and Hiroyuki Sanada would be returning to reprise their roles in the sequel.

On April 17, 2023, Garner confirmed that filming would run from June to September in Queensland, Australia, while That Hashtag Show reported that Shao Kahn, Baraka, Kitana, Quan Chi, and Sindel were slated to appear.

It was theatrically released in the United States on May 8, 2026.

== See also ==
- List of films based on video games
