= Kitana =

Mortal Kombat character

- Mortal Kombat character
- Kitana in Mortal Kombat 1 (2023)
- First game: Mortal Kombat II (1993)
- Created by: Ed Boon; John Tobias
- Designed by: Various: John Tobias (MKII, UMK3); Allen Ditzig (MK:DA, MK:A); Mark Lappin (MK:SM); Cy Mandua (MKvsDCU); Atomhawk Design (MK2011)
- Voiced by: Various: Peg Burr (MKII, UMK3); Rosalind Dugas (MK4); Lita Lopez (MK:SM); S.G. Willie (MKvsDCU); Karen Strassman (2011–2015); Kari Wahlgren (2019–present); Cree Summer (animated series); Grey DeLisle (animated films)
- Portrayed by: Various: Talisa Soto (1990s films); Audie England, Dara Tomanovich (television); Samantha Jo (web series); Adeline Rudolph (2026 film)
- Motion capture: Various: Katalin Zamiar (MKII); Becky Gable (UMK3); Lorrisa Julianus (MKvsDCU); Brenda Barrie (MK2011); Emily Marso (MK11,MK1); Kaprice Imperial (MK11, facial); Quynh Chi Nguyen (MK1, facial)

In-universe information
- Species: Edenian
- Weapon: Steel fans

Kitana (/kɪˈtɑːnə/ ki-TAH-nə) is a fictional character in the Mortal Kombat media franchise. She debuted in Mortal Kombat II (1993) as a player character and a royal from the fictional realm of Edenia. She uses steel fans as her primary weapon. Kitana is originally depicted as being the daughter of Shao Kahn, the ruler of Outworld, but is later revealed to be the true daughter of King Jerrod, the king of Edenia. In the series, Kitana is aligned with multiple characters, including Mileena, who originally served as her clone. Kitana, one the franchise's main characters, also serves as the love interest for the series' protagonist Liu Kang. In Mortal Kombat 11 (2019), Kitana becomes Kahn of Outworld after defeating Shao Kahn.

During the development of the original Mortal Kombat (1992), the franchise's co-creator John Tobias intended for a character known as "Kitsune" to be in the game. Although "Kitsune" was removed, that character later came into existence under the name "Kitana", which is derived from the two words "Kitsune" and "Katana". Throughout the Mortal Kombat series, Kitana eventually becomes one of its mainstays. Kitana is depicted as a warm-blooded woman, fighting for the protection of her realm and its people. Kitana has been featured in various media outside of the games, such as films and comics. She is well received by critics for her appearance, personality, and character development. She has become one of the most popular and iconic characters of the franchise and is often considered the face or mascot of the Mortal Kombat female characters.

== History and development ==
John Tobias' sketch of unused character "Kitsune" from the original Mortal Kombat, and his concept art for Kitana in Ultimate Mortal Kombat 3

An early version of Kitana appeared in the original Mortal Kombat named "Kitsune" who was conceived by the series co-creator and character designer John Tobias and inspired by the Princess Mariko from Jordan Mechner's 1984 computer game Karateka. She was intended to be an unplayable herald-like character who wielded a single ornamental fan and a princess daughter to "Shang Lao—the spoil of victory for winning the tournament"—who would ultimately betray her father after Kitsune fell for the game's protagonist Liu Kang. Kitsune was omitted from the game but included in the sequel Mortal Kombat II, with a revised storyline introducing her as the stepdaughter of Shao Kahn, the game's main antagonist. Tobias had to rename Kitana, as her original name was rejected for being Japanese and thus not compatible with Shang and Shao both possessing Chinese roots. The final name "Kitana" is a portmanteau of words Kitsune and Katana that sounded "generically Asian enough". She was originally outfitted with a pair of sai before Ed Boon suggested that the character could be palette-swapped, which resulted in the creation of Kitana's twin Mileena being given the sai while Kitana instead brandished war fans. In 2009, Boon included Kitana among the series' most recognizable characters alongside Scorpion, Sub-Zero, and Liu Kang. Skarlet, a female ninja who debuted as a playable character in the 2011 Mortal Kombat reboot, originated in MKII from a false player rumor of a glitch that would turn Kitana's outfit red.

Martial artist Katalin Zamiar played Kitana and the game's other palette-swapped female ninjas in MKII, with Kitana's steel fans used for filming constructed from a reflective paper material. Zamiar was hired after meeting Boon and Tobias, who were members of her fitness center at the time. Zamiar did not return for Ultimate Mortal Kombat 3 due to legal issues with Midway Games and was replaced by Becky Gable. Kitana was included in early versions of Mortal Kombat 4 before being replaced by new character Tanya. For the series' transition into 3D, beginning with Mortal Kombat: Deadly Alliance, Kitana and the other ninja characters were given their own distinct redesigns.

Most of Kitana's special moves are utilized for her fans either as a melee weapon, a projectile, or a means to lift her enemies airborne. (Note: During early production runs of Mortal Kombat II, Kitana's "Fan Lift" special move could be used to completely immobilize opponents in the corner of the screen and allow players to connect with a series of uncontested attacks, resulting in changes being made to eliminate this and balance out the game.) In Mortal Kombat X and onward, Kitana's play style is split into three fighting variations similar to other characters. According to Boon, Kitana's "Kiss of Death" Fatality, first seen in MKII, was inspired by the demise of villain Mr. Big (Dr. Kananga) in the 1973 James Bond film Live and Let Die. Kitana's other most recurring finisher decapitates opponents with her fan, which has been featured in almost all of her game appearances and is expanded in Mortal Kombat 2011 where she cuts off the defeated opponents' arms before beheading them.

=== Gameplay ===
Kitana was chosen as the best Mortal Kombat II fighter by the editors of Sega Power and Super Play for being "good all around" and due to her quick attacks and perceived similarities to Chun-Li. Amiga Power too called her "a really good character to pick" and Cinema Blend stated Kitana "could absolutely dominate" the game. However, GamePro's strategy guide ranked Kitana as only the seventh best of the 12 fighters in MKII (citing her devastating combos, powerful "Fan Throw" move, and good sweep and reach hindered by slow release of the fan-based special moves and limited attack patterns); it was her clone Mileena who landed on the top of their chart. According to a retrospective by Complex, Kitana "had the most powerful projectile attack, and along with Mileena, the fastest throws and sweeps." "Kitana's big combos in the corner" were among Ed Boon's favourite things in the game: "When I saw people do Kitana's combos I knew there was something special, because people were taking the game to a new direction." EGM described Kitana as "a force to be reckoned with" and predicted she would "make a big impact as her Fan Wave leaves foes open to combos." In the Game Gear version of MKII, however, Kitana's fan lifts the opponent too low and too far away for an easy combo.

Kitana's combo abilities were severely downgraded for Ultimate Mortal Kombat 3 (and, by extension, Mortal Kombat Trilogy), for which she received no new special moves unlike most of the other characters. According to Nintendo Power, "with such a small repertoire, Princess Kitana will be sorely challenged by experienced warriors," even as her fan toss is faster than many other projectile attacks. Sega Saturn Magazine opined that "Kitana's lack of enhancements doesn't make her as exciting to play as some of the other characters, though her excellent juggle combos still work - and they can do loads of damage," According to Total 64, "her moves are a little unfriendly and her combos are a touch difficult." EGM Strategy Guide for UMK3 stated: "She had deadly corner traps with damage in up to 90 percent [in MKII]. Now, her fan-raise combos have been severely crippled to almost not being worth it." Nevertheless, X360 called the CPU Kitana "the worst possible character to come up against" in the single-player Tower mode of UMK3, as she is "fast, impossible to sweep, and capable of rendering any opponent incapable with a waft of her fan." According to Dreamcast Magazine, Mortal Kombat Gold's returning "old favourites like Sub-Zero, Kitana and Baraka" too had by then "dated moves and fatalities." Her combos improved in the later games, and according to BradyGames' official guide for Mortal Kombat: Deadly Alliance, "Kitana stays at the top of the heap as far as kombatants go. In any stance, she can pump out over 30% with relative ease, making her one of the deadliest in the hands of a beginner or a master." Kitana was later found to be capable of infinite-loop corner combos in her "Mournful" variation in Mortal Kombat X.

In Mortal Kombat: Shaolin Monks, Kitana is fought as a boss character twice in the game's main story mode and is one of the unlockable player characters for the versus mode. Prima Games' guide to Shaolin Monks states she is "quick enough for moderate damage, and has some of the most potent special moves in the game," but her limitation is that she needs to be fighting at close range to make use of it. Regarding Mortal Kombat: Armageddon, however, Prima declared Kitana "a tough character to win with" and "like many of the other low-tier character types, she's lacking in almost every aspect" (even as she "is a little better on defense than she is on offense"). She was rated overall only 4/10 for this game. Their official guide for Mortal Kombat vs. DC Universe, on the other hand, called her "one of the more dangerous characters in the game due to her speed and extremely effective move-set." Prima's official guide for 2011's Mortal Kombat deemed Kitana a capable fighter who once again "is at her deadliest in the corner" and is also especially good if played against Baraka and Cyber Sub-Zero. Prima observed Kitana in MK2011 as her "cheapest" (unduly overpowered) incarnation so far, stating "Kitana is not only one of the most damaging characters in the game, but in addition to the Fan Lift and Square Wave Punch, she can combo her Air Fan almost any time an opponent is airborne." According to Prima's guide to MKX, "Kitana is one of the more unique characters in the game" due to her inheriting many of Jade's special moves, and she "is a zoning character at heart, but she can play offensively or defensively" depending on a variation chosen. The guide recommended the "Mournful" variant for former Jade players, and the "Assassin" variant, which "tries to take the generally defensive style Kitana has in MKX and add some offensive firepower to it," for veteran Kitana players.

== Appearances ==
=== Mortal Kombat games ===
Kitana debuts in Mortal Kombat II (1993) alongside her sister Mileena as Outworld emperor Shao Kahn's personal assassins. While she is ten thousand years old, she resembles a younger woman. In her ending, Kitana turns against Kahn after learning that her parents were once rulers of Outworld until they were forcefully overthrown by Kahn, while Mileena is an evil clone created by the sorcerer Shang Tsung.

Kitana and the series' other ninja characters were excluded from Mortal Kombat 3 (1995), but her backstory is expanded therein with the introduction of a new character Sindel. Kitana is revealed as the daughter of Queen Sindel and King Jerrod, who ruled the Outworld realm of Edenia until it was invaded by Kahn and his forces, during which Kahn kills Jerrod and takes Kitana as his daughter. After Sindel commits suicide rather than serve as Kahn's consort, she is resurrected and used by Kahn as a means to illegally invade Earthrealm. Realizing her life had been a lie, Kitana turns against Kahn and allies with Earth's champions to defeat him. The ninjas returned as playable characters in the 1995 upgrade Ultimate Mortal Kombat 3, in which Kitana is tried for treason after killing her evil twin Mileena, but before a verdict is reached, Kitana escapes and joins the Earth heroes to reach Sindel and warn her of her true past. Kitana and fellow Edenian Jade free Sindel from Shao Kahn's mind control, which enables reigning Mortal Kombat champion Liu Kang to defeat him and results in Edenia and Earth returning to their peaceful states.

During the events of Mortal Kombat Gold (1999; a Dreamcast-exclusive upgrade of Mortal Kombat 4), fallen Elder God Shinnok and his cohort Quan Chi invade Edenia, aided by the traitorous Edenian Tanya. When Quan Chi and his forces later leave the realm to focus on attacking thunder god Raiden and the Earth heroes, Kitana escapes to aid her allies in defeating Shinnok. With Edenia freed once again, Kitana offers Liu Kang the chance to rule Edenia by her side, which he reluctantly rejects due to his duty as Earth's champion. In a special-edition MK4 comic book released with the 1998 PC version of the game, Kitana arranges peace between the warring Shokan and Centaurian races.

In Mortal Kombat: Deadly Alliance (2002), Kitana leads a preemptive strike against Shao Kahn's forces, but Kahn is killed by unknown assassins later revealed as the titular Deadly Alliance of Quan Chi and Shang Tsung, who formed alliances to kill Kahn and Liu Kang before attempting to revive the mysterious Dragon King. Despite her grief, she leads the Earth warriors into an assault on Shang Tsung's palace, where she faces Quan Chi but is outmatched and killed alongside her allies.

As a result of her death in the previous game, Kitana is unplayable in Mortal Kombat: Deception (2004), (Note: Kitana is selectable in Mortal Kombat: Unchained, the 2006 PSP port of the game.) in which she and her slain companions are resurrected and controlled by the game's final boss, the Dragon King Onaga, who additionally uses her to defeat and imprison Sindel and then install Mileena to pose as Kitana. However, Jade frees Sindel before imprisoning Kitana, and together they flee to Outworld to figure out how to free Kitana from Onaga's influence. Meanwhile, Liu Kang's spirit is able to remain amongst the living after his murder, and he enlists the reformed ninja Ermac to help him free Kitana and his friends from Onaga's control, a mission in which they are successful.

In the spinoff game Mortal Kombat: Shaolin Monks (2005), after Kitana was found to be no longer loyal to Shao Kahn, she was placed into a spell-induced trance and forced to fight the Earth heroes, Mileena, and Jade before being freed by the Shaolin warrior monks Liu Kang and Kung Lao. Eventually, Kitana slays Mileena.

Following this warning, Kitana returned in Mortal Kombat: Armageddon (2006), accompanied by Liu Kang's spirit in order to keep him whole until she found a way to reunite him with his body. They later meet with Nightwolf, who offers to relieve Kitana of her burden by absorbing Liu Kang's soul, allowing her to fight against the coming evil. Kitana ultimately perishes alongside the rest of her allies during the battle.

In the non-canonical crossover game Mortal Kombat vs. DC Universe (2008), Kitana is transported to Metropolis, where she encounters Wonder Woman. As she suffers from "kombat rage" at the time, Kitana hallucinates Wonder Woman as an assassin sent from Outworld and challenges her. After being defeated, Kitana flees to a different section of Metropolis, where she is found and defeated by Scorpion and brought to Raiden's temple, where she reveals she had a vision of Darkseid to become Dark Kahn. Following this, Kitana joins the rest of the combatants in traveling to the fused realms of Outworld and Apokolips and fighting the DC Universe's heroes and villains while Raiden and Superman destroy Dark Kahn.

In the rebooted timeline of Mortal Kombat (2011), which retells the events of the first three Mortal Kombat games, Shao Kahn sends her and Jade to participate in a Mortal Kombat tournament. Kitana tries to defeat Liu Kang, but ends up being defeated. Anticipating her death, she is shocked by his choice to let her live. In the second tournament, Raiden approaches Kitana and reveals that her belief that she is Shao Kahn's daughter is false. Riddled with uncertainty, she secretly entered Shang Tsung's flesh pits and came across the recently made Mileena. Prior to meeting Kahn, she blames Shang Tsung for replacing her, only to be surprised by the revelation that the Emperor was the one who created Mileena. Before carrying out the execution, he locks Kitana in the palace and demands for his real daughter to be brought to him. Liu Kang quickly helps Kitana to be liberated, and they, along with Jade, flee to Earth to team up with their new comrades in the fight against Outworld's army. They help in the fight for Earth, but are slain by Kitana's evil mother, Sindel, along with other warriors. Ultimately, it is revealed that she is among the fighters brought back to life as revenants by Quan Chi in the Netherrealm to fight against Raiden.

In Mortal Kombat 11 (2019), Kitana's revenant aligns herself with the keeper of time, Kronika. As a result of Kronika's actions however, a past version of Kitana and Liu Kang are brought to the present. While he travels to Earthrealm to find out more about what happened, she stays in Outworld to find Shao Kahn, who has also been brought to the present. To aid the new Outworld emperor Kotal Kahn, Kitana forges alliances with Outworld's disparate factions before leading them into battle against Shao Kahn and personally defeating and maiming him herself. Kotal, who was crippled during the fight, appoints Kitana as the new Kahn of Outworld in recognition of her skills in combat. After Kronika kidnaps Liu Kang, Kitana and her Outworld army aid Earthrealm's allied forces against Kronika's army until Raiden merges himself with Liu Kang to become Fire God Liu Kang. As the rest of her allies fight off Kronika's forces, Kitana joins Liu Kang in breaching Kronika's keep. However, Kronika reverses time for everyone except Liu Kang, who faces her and his allies' revenants alone. In one of the game's endings, Liu Kang defeats Kronika and is able to bring Kitana back to help him forge a new timeline. In the DLC story expansion Aftermath, Kitana is brought back to life by Fujin and Shang Tsung to join forces with Sindel in the battle against Kronika. Nevertheless, she is shocked to discover her mother's real character when she was unable to prevent her from betraying Earth and Outworld.

In Mortal Kombat 1's rebooted timeline, Mileena is biologically her older twin sister at birth and they have a steady relationship with each other as well as their mother, Sindel. Due to being slightly older, Mileena is set to inherit the throne, but her family fears her potential banishment from the throne due to her affliction with the Tarkat disease. They are initially deceived by Shang Tsung and General Shao into believing Earthrealm is plotting against them until Fire God Liu Kang and his allies expose their atrocities. Though they are reunited with their father, Jerrod, after he takes control of Ermac's body, Sindel is killed shortly afterwards by her evil counterpart from Titan Shang Tsung's timeline and passes the throne to Mileena. To defeat Titan Shang Tsung, Liu Kang brings over Kitana from an alternate timeline where she defeated Kronika and became a Titan, and they passionately embrace each other before recruiting more Titan allies to face off against the threat. After Titan Shang Tsung's defeat, Titan Kitana returns to her own timeline, and the Kitana from Liu Kang's timeline replaces Shao as the General of Outworld's army while continuing to advise her sister.

=== Other media ===
Kitana had a brief appearance in a Midway-published Mortal Kombat II comic book prequel that was written and illustrated by series co-creator John Tobias and served to introduce the game's new characters. She is a minor character in Malibu Comics' 1994–1995 Mortal Kombat comic book series, first appearing in the three-issue miniseries Goro: Prince of Pain (1994), joining other MKII characters in searching for Goro in Outworld. Kitana's role in the six-issue miniseries "Battlewave" (1995) has her attempting to rebel against Shao Kahn. She was additionally the subject of the 1995 one-shot "Kitana and Mileena: Sister Act", in which her background from the games is intact, except she is already an adult when Shao Kahn kills Jerrod and seizes the realm and then bewitches her into believing she is Kahn's daughter.

Talisa Soto as Kitana in Mortal Kombat (1995)

Kitana was a supporting character in the 1990s Mortal Kombat feature films, unmasked throughout and portrayed by Talisa Soto. She is introduced as a companion of Shang Tsung and described only as his adversary due to her being the rightful heir of Outworld and thus a threat to his rule should she ally herself with the Earth fighters. Kitana eventually joins main protagonist Liu Kang and the Earthrealm heroes in defeating the sorcerer. The film's producer Lauri Apelian commented that the two main female characters (Kitana and Sonya Blade, played by Bridgette Wilson) "needed to have a strength and an independence and an intellect that went well beyond their beauty and being sexy." Kitana has a lesser role in the 1997 sequel Mortal Kombat Annihilation, in which she is mostly kept in Shao Kahn's captivity before being freed by Liu Kang. She joins the Earth heroes in their victorious final battle over Kahn's forces. Soto underwent five weeks of martial arts training for the first film, and additionally learned Brazilian stick fighting for her use of the character's steel fans in Annihilation. Kitana was not included in the 2021 feature film Mortal Kombat, but appears as the main protagonist in the 2026 sequel played by Adeline Rudolph.

Kitana is a main character in the 1996 animated television series Mortal Kombat: Defenders of the Realm, a loose adaptation of Mortal Kombat 3. She was voiced by Cree Summer.

She appeared in three episodes of the 1998 syndicated live-action television series Mortal Kombat: Conquest, with the role split by Audie England and Dara Tomanovich. She is fully aware of her Edenian past and the deaths of her parents at Kahn's hands but has no direct relation to Mileena.

Kitana was featured in a two-part episode of the 2011 web series Mortal Kombat: Legacy, which combined live action and animated sequences. She was played by martial artist and stuntwoman Samantha Jo, in her acting debut. The episodes are another retelling of Kitana's past from the games but with changes such as Sindel fusing her soul with Kitana's in hopes to avoid Shao Kahn's corruption before she commits suicide. When Mileena kills a man who is actually their father King Jerrod, Kitana learns the truth after her past and decides to turn against Shao Kahn in the upcoming Mortal Kombat tournament. Jo reprised the role in one episode of the 2013 second season.

Kitana was voiced by Grey DeLisle in the animated film Mortal Kombat Legends: Scorpion's Revenge (2020), featuring in a fight scene against Liu Kang in the Mortal Kombat tournament. DeLisle reprised the role in the Legends sequel Battle of the Realms (2021), in which Kitana works alongside Kahn's forces in invading Earth before rebelling against him and allying with the Earth fighters.

On March 29, 2025, Kitana was added as a purchasable skin in the online game Fortnite Battle Royale alongside two fellow Mortal Kombat fighters, Scorpion and Raiden.

=== Merchandise ===
Action figures of Kitana were released in the UK by Toy Island in 1996, Mezco Toyz in 2015, and by Funko, as both a Funko Pop! vinyl figurine in 2017 and a traditional figure the following year. Syco Collectibles released a 1/6-scale limited-edition polystone Kitana statue in 2012, while Pop Culture Shock Collectibles released a 1/4-scale character statuette in 2013 and a 1/3-scale version in 2018. Other items included a character mousepad, a life-sized cardboard standee, and Halloween costumes.

== Reception ==
=== Critical reception ===
Critical reception of Kitana has varied, often with emphasis placed on her good looks and sometimes on her relatively complicated personality. Ben Kendrick of Game Rant noted that "apart from possessing one of the cooler weapons" in the series, she "lacks the entertaining/alluring oddity" of her counterpart Mileena. GameFront opined the same year that Kitana has "not [been] a very compelling character." Though she and Mileena were included in GamePro's 2009 list of the seventeen best palette-swapped video game characters alongside the series' male ninjas, Dan Ryckert of Game Informer wrote in 2010 that he did not want these characters, aside from Scorpion and Sub-Zero, in future series installments. Kitana's "Kiss of Death" Fatality from Mortal Kombat II has met with critical praise.

Response to Kitana's alternate-media incarnations have been variably received. Laura Evenson of San Francisco Chronicle noted Talisa Soto's attractiveness in the 1995 Mortal Kombat film, but found her character otherwise uninteresting as compared to Robin Shou's Liu Kang. Ben Steelman of the Star-News described her as "basically Princess Leia in black leotards," but James Stephanie Sterling of Destructoid noted Kitana's "more sensible makeover" therein in contrast to her in-game designs. Michael Saunders of The Boston Globe wrote in his 1997 review of Mortal Kombat Annihilation that Soto "never seems to do much more other than look exotic in the role." The 2011 Mortal Kombat Legacy first-season episode "Kitana & Mileena" was nominated for a Writers Guild of America Award in the category of "Outstanding Achievement in Writing Derivative New Media".

=== Sex appeal ===
Kitana is considered a prominent sex symbol in the Mortal Kombat series, in a display of what one author described as manifestation of "pseudo-Japanese Orientalist fetishes." According to Joey Esposito of MTV, "it's obvious that Mortal Kombat II added in some more, let's say, sexually suggestive characters in Mileena and Kitana," Danny Gallagher of MTV's Guy Code ranked Kitana among the "best babes in video games" of 2011, but commented that she had "the deepest emotional core of any of the Mortal Kombat characters." Den of Geek commented that "Kitana became one of the breakout stars of the series" upon her MKII debut, "easily having more meat on her character than Sonya ever did."

=== Gender criticism and Fatalities ===
There have been controversies and mixed or negative critical reception of the character. In 1994, she was one of the fighting game characters cited by Guy Aoki of AsianWeek as allegedly perpetuating existing stereotypes of Asians as martial arts experts. In the video game violence controversy themed book Interacting With Video, Patricia Marks Greenfield and Rodney R. Cocking used the "two Asian twin sisters, Kitana and Mileena" as an example of "highly eroticized Dragon Lady" stereotyping in video games. When Marsha Kinder accused Mortal Kombat II of misogyny in its handling of female characters, she alleged that "some of the most violent possibilities are against women," whose own "fatality moves are highly eroticised." Patrick Sunnen's book Making Sense of Video Games judged their portrayal as "formidable female opponents" to be potentially progressive, yet arguably made just to increase "the sexist potential of the individual fights", and described Kitana's Fatality of decapitation with a "deceptively feminine razor-sharp fan" to be castration-like. Chad Hunter of Complex chose Jade and Kitana to represent the "women who fight" stereotype in his 2012 list of the fifteen most stereotypical characters in video games, for being "half-naked skanks who can fight, hurl lasers and perform aerobatic attacks while wearing thongs, high-heeled boots and keeping their giant breasts under scarves," claiming that this has caused "female gamers [to] slide away from this series."

== See also ==
- Ninja in popular culture
