= Mortal Kombat Annihilation =

1997 martial arts fantasy film

- Theatrical release poster
- Directed by: John R. Leonetti
- Screenplay by: Brent V. Friedman; Bryce Zabel
- Story by: Lawrence Kasanoff; Joshua Wexler; John Tobias
- Based on: Mortal Kombat by: Ed Boon; John Tobias
- Produced by: Lawrence Kasanoff
- Starring: Robin Shou; Talisa Soto; Brian Thompson; Sandra Hess; Lynn "Red" Williams; Irina Pantaeva; James Remar
- Cinematography: Matthew F. Leonetti
- Edited by: Peck Prior
- Music by: George S. Clinton
- Production companies: New Line Cinema; Threshold Entertainment
- Distributed by: New Line Cinema
- Release date: November 21, 1997
- Running time: 95 minutes
- Country: United States
- Language: English
- Budget: $30 million
- Box office: $51.3 million

Mortal Kombat Annihilation is a 1997 American martial arts fantasy film based on the video game franchise Mortal Kombat. It is the second installment in the Mortal Kombat film series and a sequel to the 1995 film. Largely adapted from the 1995 video game Mortal Kombat 3, Annihilation follows Liu Kang and his allies as they attempt to prevent the malevolent Shao Kahn from conquering Earthrealm. Directed by John R. Leonetti, the film stars Robin Shou as Liu Kang, Talisa Soto as Kitana, James Remar as Rayden, Sandra Hess as Sonya Blade, Lynn “Red” Williams as Jax and Brian Thompson as Shao Kahn. Only Shou and Soto reprise their roles, with other characters from the previous film being recast.

Mortal Kombat Annihilation was theatrically released on November 21, 1997, by New Line Cinema. It received negative reviews and grossed $51.3 million on a $30 million budget. A direct sequel was consequently canceled and a third film languished in development hell for nearly two decades until the series was rebooted in 2021.

== Plot ==
The Outworld emperor Shao Kahn opens a portal to Earthrealm and has resurrected Queen Sindel, Princess Kitana's long-deceased mother, to facilitate his invasion. Thunder god Rayden and Earthrealm warriors Liu Kang, Sonya Blade, and Johnny Cage try to defend themselves, but Kahn kills Cage. The Earthrealm warriors retreat to seek allies.

Shao Kahn sends his senior warriors to lead squads hunting down the remaining warriors. Kahn executes General Rain for defeating but not killing Kabal and Stryker, and promotes Sindel to General.

Sonya Blade finds and enlists the help of her Special Forces partner, Jax. Blade and Jax escape and defeat Cyrax, and later, Sonya defeats an ambush from Mileena.

Kitana and Liu search for a Native American shaman named Nightwolf, who seemingly knows the key to defeating Kahn. Before leaving the air tunnel caves Cyber Smoke attacks and is defeated with the assistance of Sub Zero, the Original's younger brother. Sub Zero was Cyber Smoke's original target until Shao Kahn reprogrammed Cyber Smoke to hunt Liu Kang and Kitana. Before Sub Zero can help them escape Scorpion appears, fights Sub Zero, and kidnaps Kitana when Liu Kang saves Sub Zero from falling into a lava river.

Rayden meets with the Elder Gods and asks them why Kahn was allowed to break the tournament rules and force his way into Earthrealm, and how he can be stopped. One says that reuniting Kitana with her mother, Sindel, is the key to breaking Kahn's hold on Earthrealm, but another Elder God insists that the defeat of Kahn himself is the solution. Rayden is then asked by the Elder Gods about his feelings and obligations towards the mortals, and what he would be willing to do to ensure their survival.

Liu finds Nightwolf, who teaches him about the power of the Animality, a form of shapeshifting which utilizes the caster's strengths and abilities. To achieve the mindset needed to acquire this power, Liu must pass three tests. The first is a trial of his self-esteem, courage, and focus. The second comes in the form of temptation, which manifests itself in the form of Jade, a mysterious warrior who attempts to seduce Liu and offers her assistance after he resists her advances. Liu accepts Jade's offer and takes her with him to the Elder Gods' temple, where he and his friends meet with Rayden. The third test is never revealed.

The Earthrealm warriors learn that Rayden has sacrificed his immortality to freely fight alongside them. Together, they infiltrate Outworld to rescue Kitana and reunite her with Sindel in hopes of restoring her soul and closing the Outworld portal to Earth. Liu Kang focuses on rescuing Kitana, Rayden fights a few of Shao Kahn’s raptors, and the others incapacitate Sindel. Liu Kang finds Kitana and rescues her after knocking Baraka into a fire pit and crushing Sheeva with Kitana's cage.

The Earthrealm warriors reconvene for the ritual. However, Sindel remains under Kahn's control and the ritual fails. Jade reveals herself to be a double agent sent by Kahn to disrupt the heroes' plans, sneaking away while Sindel leaves laughing in a cyclone. They discuss and learn how Shao Kahn's machinations are succeeding and learn Rayden and Shao Kahn are both sons of Shinnok, a corrupt Elder God, and thus brothers.

Kahn feeds Jade to a gargoyle for her failure despite Sindel's protests, much to Motaro's amusement. Rayden reveals that the former Elder God Shinnok is their father a decreed his heir would be the brother willing to destroy the other. Rayden admits he defeated but could not kill Kahn. He realizes that Shinnok is supporting Kahn. Rayden and the Earthrealm warriors make their way to Kahn, Sindel, and his remaining generals. Shinnok demands that Rayden submit to him and restore their broken family, at the expense of his mortal friends. Rayden refuses and is killed by an energy blast from Shao Kahn.

Jax, Sonya, and Kitana emerge victorious over Kahn's generals (with Jax defeating Motaro, Kitana defeating her mother, and Sonya defeating Ermac). Liu struggles with Kahn. Liu's Animality proves effective, exposing a cut to Kahn that proves he is now mortal, as a consequence of his breaking the sacred rules. Shinnok attempts to intervene and kill Liu on Kahn's behalf, but two of the Elder Gods arrive, having uncovered Shinnok's treachery. They declare that the fate of Earth shall be decided in Mortal Kombat. Liu defeats Kahn, and Shinnok is banished to the Netherrealm. Earthrealm is instantly reverted to its former state. With Kahn's hold over Sindel broken, she reunites with Kitana. Rayden is revived by the Elder Gods, who bestow upon him his father's former position. Before departing to the immortal realm, he enjoins the Earthrealm warriors to be there for one another. The Earthrealm warriors return home.

== Cast ==
- Robin Shou as Liu Kang
- Talisa Soto as Kitana
- James Remar as Rayden
- Sandra Hess as Sonya Blade
- Lynn "Red" Williams as Jax
- Brian Thompson as Shao Kahn
- Reiner Schöne as Shinnok
- Musetta Vander as Sindel
- Irina Pantaeva as Jade
- Deron McBee as Motaro
- Marjean Holden as Sheeva
- Litefoot as Nightwolf
- Chris Conrad as Johnny Cage
- John Medlen as Ermac
- J. J. Perry as Cyrax / Scorpion / Noob Saibot
- Tyrone Wiggins as Rain
- Dennis Keiffer as Baraka
- Ridley Tsui Po-Wah as Smoke
- Keith Cooke Hirabayashi as Sub-Zero
- Dana Hee as Mileena
- Ed Boon as the voice of Scorpion

== Production ==
Mortal Kombat Annihilation is loosely based on the 1995 video game Mortal Kombat 3, while featuring the character roster of Ultimate Mortal Kombat 3. There were also plot elements from Mortal Kombat 4, but these scenes were cut from the final theatrical version. While the original attracted casual moviegoers as well as gamers, Annihilation catered exclusively to the games' fans. Producer Lawrence Kasanoff said he was trying to make the film "even more spectacular than the first movie, which earned a healthy $73 million in the U.S. Annihilation is three times more ambitious than Mortal Kombat. Our theme for the sequel is to shoot for more—more fights, more special effects, more Outworld, more everything." He also noted that despite being much more ambitious than the original, it only had a marginally higher budget.

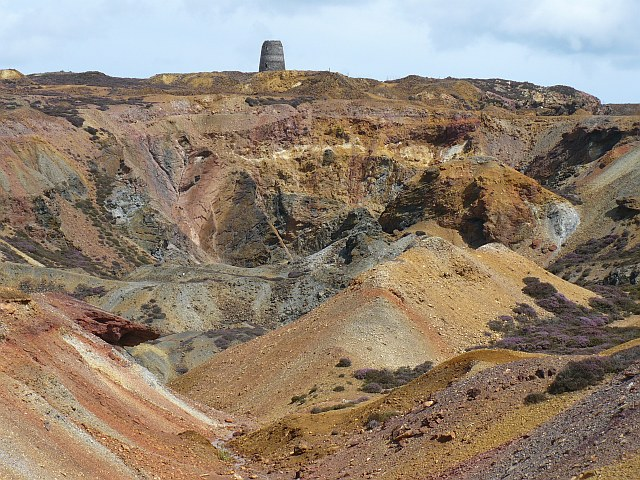
Parys Mountain in 2008

Filming began in October 1996 and ran through to March 1997. Part of the movie was filmed on location at Parys Mountain on the island of Anglesey, off the coast of Wales (incorrectly listed as being part of England in the closing credits). Other filming locations included London, Jordan, and Thailand. In a 1997 interview, Kasanoff said that Israeli and Jordanian crew members worked together on the film in harmony, despite the ongoing geopolitical tensions between Israel and Arab countries. It was the first time any Israelis had ever worked in Jordan for a film, One of the spots they shot in with the Israeli/Jordanian crew was Petra, a holy city built into the rocks adorning the Jordanian desert. Kasanoff remembered, "the Israelis had tears in their eyes when we went there because of the political climate. They’ve never been able to visit this place". According to Kasanoff, while staying in Jordan, the hosts offered the crew local food which included an assortment of raw brains, which they found difficult to eat, with Kasanoff saying, "you just have to smile and have another bite or find a polite way of refusing.”

Though Annihilation attempted to continue in the style of the first movie, the cast of returning characters from the original was almost completely overhauled; only Robin Shou (Liu Kang) and Talisa Soto (Kitana) reprised their roles, while the only other actor to return was Keith Cooke (Reptile in the first film) as Sub-Zero. Stephen Painter and Neill Gorton provided some of the props for the film. J. J. Perry replaced Chris Casamassa as Scorpion, as Casamassa chose to do Batman & Robin instead. Bridgette Wilson was replaced as Sonya by Sandra Hess, with Wilson instead choosing to appear in the film The Real Blonde.

The French release of the movie was known as Mortal Kombat: Destruction Finale (Final Destruction), while the Italian release was titled Mortal Kombat: Distruzione Totale (Total Destruction). The French-Canadian release was translated ad literam as Mortal Kombat: Anéantissement (Annihilation)

Thai actor and martial artist Tony Jaa was a stunt double for Robin Shou in the film.

== Music ==
Mortal Kombat Annihilation: Original Motion Picture Soundtrack

Soundtrack album by Various artists
- Released: October 28, 1997
- Genres: Electronica; industrial rock; heavy metal; techno; punk rock
- Length: 72:08
- Label: TVT Records
- Producers: Lawrence Kasanoff; Steve Gottlieb

Professional ratings
Review scores
Source	Rating
Allmusic	2.5/5 stars

Mortal Kombat Annihilation is the soundtrack to the film. The Mortal Kombat theme was composed by Praga Khan and Oliver Adams. The soundtrack was released on October 28, 1997, by TVT Records.

Mortal Kombat Annihilation: Original Motion Picture Soundtrack
No.	Title	Artist	Length
1.	"Theme from Mortal Kombat (Encounter the Ultimate)"	The Immortals	3:19
2.	"Fire"	Scooter	3:14
3.	"Megalomaniac"	KMFDM	4:19
4.	"Almost Honest (Danny Saber Mix)"	Megadeth	4:01
5.	"Genius"	Pitchshifter	4:07
6.	"Engel"	Rammstein	4:24
7.	"Panik Kontrol"	Psykosonik	3:22
8.	"Conga Fury"	Juno Reactor	5:40
9.	"Anomaly (Calling Your Name) (Granny's 7" Edit)"	Libra Presents Taylor	4:02
10.	"Ready or Not (Ben Grosse Kombat Mix)"	Manbreak	3:43
11.	"Back On a Mission"	Cirrus	3:38
12.	"I Won't Lie Down (Kombat Mix)"	Face to Face	3:22
13.	"Brutality"	Urban Voodoo	4:28
14.	"Leave U Far Behind (V2 Instrumental Mix)"	Lunatic Calm	3:09
15.	"We Have Explosive (Radio Edit)"	The Future Sound of London	3:26
16.	"Two Telephone Calls and an Air Raid"	Shaun Imrei	4:43
17.	"Death is the Only Way Out"	Joseph Bishara	3:04
18.	"X-Squad (Original Motion Picture Score)"	George S. Clinton feat. Buckethead	2:34
19.	"Theme from Mortal Kombat (Chicken Dust Mix)"	Kasz & Beal	3:33
Total length:			72:08

Though this is not mentioned on the packaging, "Megalomaniac" appears in its single edit (shortened to 4:19, from 6:07 of the complete version), and "Fire" is slightly shortened (cut to 3:14, while the single and album versions last 3:31).

== Reception ==
=== Box office ===
Mortal Kombat Annihilation was released on November 21, 1997, and its opening weekend take was $16 million, enough for a number-one debut at the box office. It grossed $35 million domestically and made $51.3 million worldwide.

=== Critical response ===
On the review aggregator website Rotten Tomatoes, 4% of 52 critics' reviews are positive, with an average rating of 2.6/10. The website's consensus reads: "With its shallow characters, low budget special effects, and mindless fight scenes, Mortal Kombat - Annihilation offers minimal plot development and manages to underachieve the low bar set by its predecessor." Metacritic, which uses a weighted average, assigned the film a score of 11 out of 100, based on 12 critics, indicating "overwhelming dislike". Audiences polled by CinemaScore gave the film an average grade of "C+" on an A+ to F scale.

In a two out of four review, Peter Stack of San Francisco Chronicle explained that "its dazzling special effects make its combatants flip and fly, spin and soar, all the while punching and kicking each other like jackhammers, only to leave viewers utterly unmoved." Jason Gibner of Allmovie wrote, "Whereas the first film was a guilty schlock pleasure, this sequel is an exercise in the art of genuinely beautiful trash cinema." Marjorie Baumgarten of the Austin Chronicle opined that it was "nothing more than a perpetual chain of elaborately choreographed fight sequences that ... are linked together by the most flimsy and laughable of plot elements." Owen Gleiberman of Entertainment Weekly gave the film a "D−" rating, calling it "abysmal" and "incoherent." R.L. Shaffer of IGN wrote in 2011: "Mortal Kombat: Annihilation is a bad movie. No way around it. Over the years, however, it has evolved into a cult hit of sorts, playing as an unintentional comedy – a spoof of the early video game movies and their painfully obvious cash-in mentality."

In separate 2012 interviews, Mortal Kombat co-creators Ed Boon and John Tobias selected Annihilation as their personal worst moments in the history of their work on the franchise.

In an interview for Luke Owen's book, Lights, Camera, Game Over, producer Lawrence Kasanoff revealed the film was released unfinished: "I'm telling you the effects in that movie are not the final effects. I never anticipated that someone would take the movie and go, 'it's good enough'. We weren't done. We never finished that movie. But the studio said, 'we don't care'. We sacrificed quality for business."

== Franchise ==
=== Canceled sequel ===
Shou's original contract was a three-picture deal, and Threshold Entertainment's production on a second sequel was initially scheduled to commence shortly after the release of Annihilation, but was shelved due to Annihilation's poor reception and disappointing box office performance. Attempts to produce a third film remained stuck in development hell, with numerous script rewrites, and storyline, cast and crew changes. A November 2001 poll on the official Mortal Kombat website hosted by Threshold asked fans which characters they believed would die in a third film.

The 2005 destruction of New Orleans by Hurricane Katrina greatly affected one of the planned shooting locations. In June 2009, a bankruptcy court lawsuit saw producer Kasanoff suing Midway Games while mentioning that a third film was in the works. Warner Bros. (which became the parent company of New Line Cinema in 2008, after over a decade of both operating as separate divisions of Time Warner) ended up purchasing most of Midway's assets, including Mortal Kombat.

=== Reboot ===
Warner Bros. released the rebooted film Mortal Kombat in 2021.

== Novelization ==
A novelization of the film was written by Jerome Preisler, published by Tor Books.

== See also ==
- List of films based on video games
