= Irina Pantaeva =

Russian-American model and actress

- Ирина Пантаева
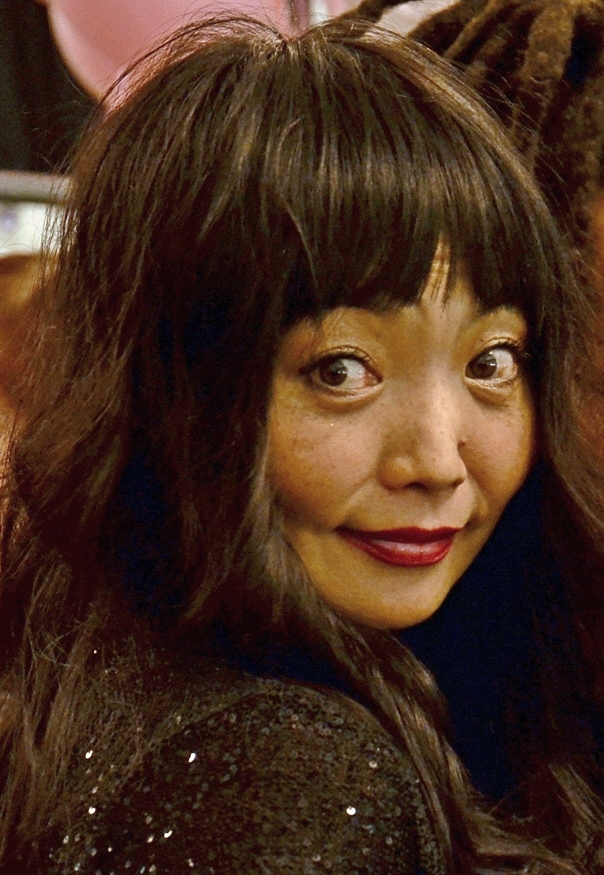
- Pantaeva in 2012
- Born: Irina Vladlenovna Pantaeva; 31 October 1967 (age 58); Ulan-Ude, Buryat ASSR, Russian SFSR, Soviet Union
- Spouse: Roland Levin (m. 1994; div. 2008)
- Children: 2
- Modeling information
- Hair color: Black
- Eye color: Brown
- Agency: Select: London; The Marilyn Agency: Paris; Ford: New York; Visage Management: Zürich

Irina Vladlenovna Pantaeva (Russian: Ирина Владленовна Пантаева; born 31 October 1967) is a Russian-American model and actress. Pantaeva was born in Ulan-Ude, Buryat ASSR, Russian SFSR, Soviet Union.

== Biography ==
Irina Pantaeva started working as a model with designer Larisa Dagdanova in 1988 in Ulan-Ude. She participated in several fashion shows with ″Larissa″ collection in China. In 1989 she won the first-ever beauty contest in Buryatia, ″Miss Ulan-Ude″. Later that same year she went to Moscow to the audition for Vozvrashchenie Khodzhi Nasreddina (Russian: Возвращение Ходжи Насреддина) movie, and filming afterwards.

In 1992, she moved to Paris to pursue her modeling career. She succeeded in getting an appointment with Karl Lagerfeld, that allowed her to join in his fashion show and the world of haute couture. Pantaeva signed a contract with "The Marilyn Agency″. In 1994, Pantaeva moved to New York City to further her career, and later appeared in Mortal Kombat Annihilation, as Jade, As Far as My Feet Will Carry Me and bit parts in Celebrity, Zoolander and People I Know, in addition to filming a guest appearance on 3rd Rock from the Sun. She also featured in the off-Broadway play Jewtopia. While in New York City, she graduated from the theatre department at New York University.

Pantaeva walked runways for designers and fashion houses, such as: Christian Dior, Versace, Alexander McQueen, Thierry Mugler, Issey Miyake, John Galliano, Yves Saint Laurent, Anna Sui, Chloé, Kenzo, appeared in fashion campaigns for Calvin Klein, GAP, Kenzo, Missoni, Levi's Jeans, and was presented on covers of the fashion magazines: Vogue, Harper's Bazaar, Elle, etc. In the second half of the 1990s, she was one of the favourite models of English fashion designer Vivienne Westwood. In 1998, she was a Sports Illustrated swimsuit model and wrote her autobiography Siberian Dream: A Memoir, which was published by Avon/Bard.

== Personal life ==
In 1989, Pantaeva had a son, Ruslan. In 1994, she married the Latvian photographer Roland Levin, from whom in 2003 she gave birth to a son, Solongo. In 2008, Pantaeva and Levin divorced.

== Filmography ==
=== Film ===
Year	Title	Role	Notes
1990	Vozvrashchenie Khodzhi Nasreddina	Kutlug-Turkan aga	
1997	An Eyewitness Account		
1997	Mortal Kombat Annihilation	Jade	
1998	Celebrity	Friend of Supermodel	
2001	Zoolander	Irina	
2001	As Far as My Feet Will Carry Me	Irina	
2002	People I Know	Summerwear Showroom Receptionist	

=== Television ===
Year	Title	Role	Notes
1998	New York Undercover	Isabel	Episode: "Drop Dead Gorgeous"
1998	3rd Rock from the Sun	Gabriella	2 episodes
2000	Normal, Ohio	The Other Lisa	Episode: "Don't Ask (Un-aired Pilot)"
