= Simon McQuoid =

Australian filmmaker

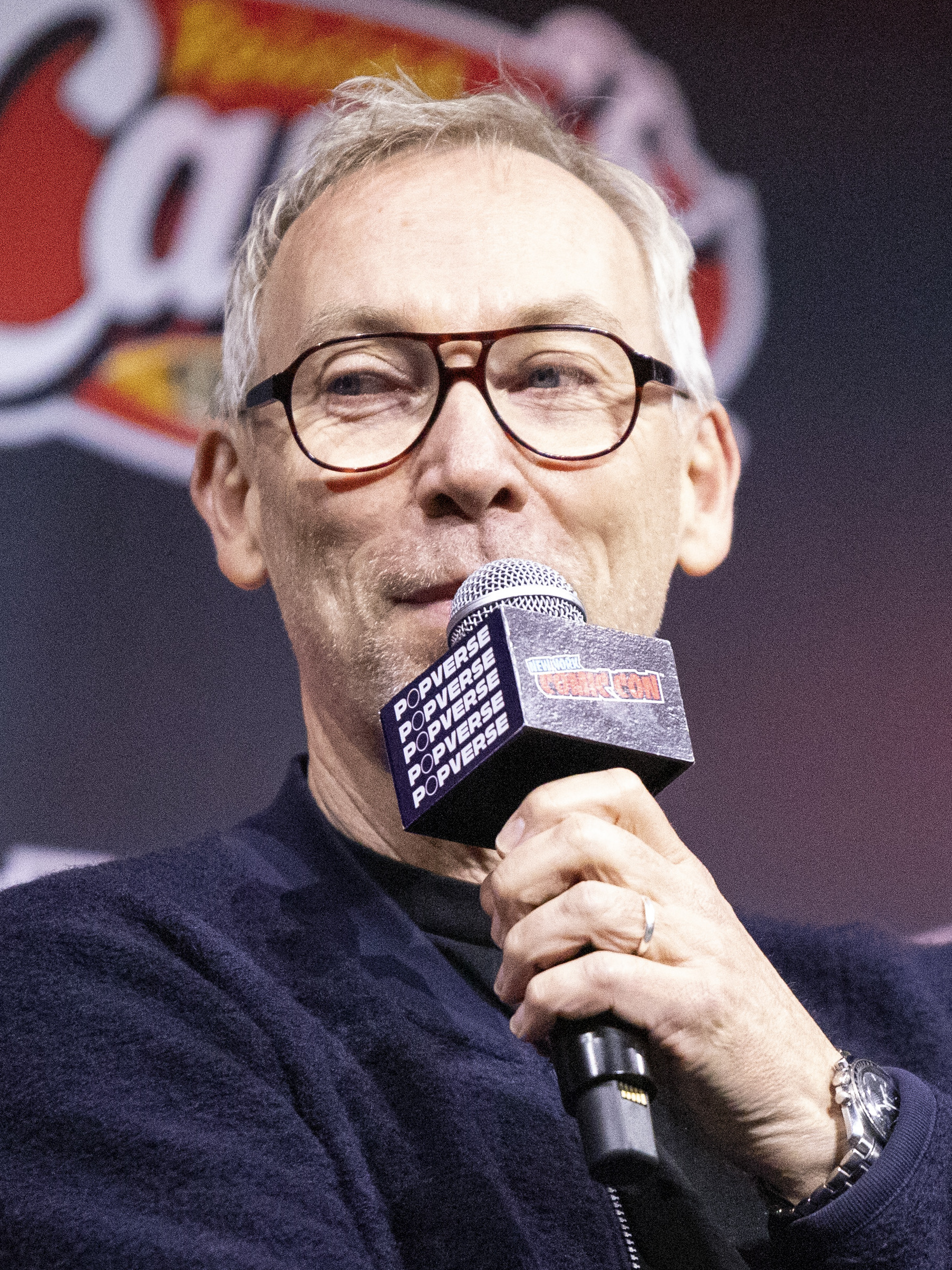
- McQuoid in 2025
- Born: Perth, Western Australia, Australia
- Education: Lesmurdie Senior High School
- Occupations: Film director; producer
- Years active: 2013–present
- Website: simonmcquoid.com

Simon McQuoid is an Australian film director and producer. He is best known for directing the 2021 reboot of Mortal Kombat and its 2026 sequel.

== Life and career ==
McQuoid was born in Perth, Western Australia, Australia and had started his career in making short films and commercials.

In November 2016, it was announced that McQuoid would make his feature directorial debut with the martial arts fantasy film Mortal Kombat, based on the video-game series and a reboot and third installment in the Mortal Kombat film series. James Wan and Todd Garner would serve as producers through their Atomic Monster and Broken Road Productions banners, respectively. The film was released in the United States on April 23, 2021 by New Line Cinema and Warner Bros. Pictures.

In January 2022, it was announced that McQuoid would return to direct Mortal Kombat II, a sequel to his 2021 film and the fourth installment in the Mortal Kombat film series. The film was released in the United States on May 8, 2026 by New Line Cinema and Warner Bros. Pictures.

In May 2022, it was announced that McQuoid would direct the science fiction film Omega for Sony and Mandalay Pictures.

== Filmography ==
Short film

- The Stone Forest (2013)
- The Night-Time Economy (2014)

Feature film

Year	Title	Director	Producer
2021	Mortal Kombat	Yes	Yes
2026	Mortal Kombat II	Yes	Yes
