= Jade (Mortal Kombat) =

Mortal Kombat character

- Mortal Kombat character
- Jade in Mortal Kombat 11 (2019)
- First game: Mortal Kombat II (1993)
- Created by: John Tobias
- Designed by: Various: John Tobias (MKII, UMK3); Jennifer Hedrick (MK:D, MK:A); Mark Lappin (MK:SM); Atomhawk Design (MK9)
- Voiced by: Various: Natalie Salzman (MK:D); Linda Lee (MK9); Mela Lee (2019–present); Emily O'Brien (2021 animated film)
- Portrayed by: Irina Pantaeva (Mortal Kombat Annihilation); Tati Gabrielle (Mortal Kombat II)
- Motion capture: Various: Katalin Zamiar (MKII); Becky Gable (UMK3, MK:A); Brenda Barrie (MK9); Alexis Gaube (MK11)

In-universe information
- Species: Edenian
- Weapon: Bō staff

Jade (/dʒeɪd/ JAYD) is a fictional character in the Mortal Kombat fighting game franchise by Midway Games and NetherRealm Studios. She debuted in Mortal Kombat II (1993) as a hidden opponent and first became playable in Ultimate Mortal Kombat 3 (1995). Her primary weapon is a steel bō staff.

In the story of the games, Jade is the childhood friend of Edenian princess Kitana. She first appears as an assassin for Outworld emperor Shao Kahn, but due to her friendship with Kitana, she supports the princess' rebellion against Shao Kahn to liberate the realms he conquered. While Jade also appears in various media outside of the games, the character has received mixed critical reception.

== Conception and development ==
Jade was initially conceived by the series developers as "an evil version of Kitana" for her introduction in Mortal Kombat II, in which she is a non-playable secret character whom players could fight after following a specific set of requirements. She was of three palette-swapped female ninjas into the game along with Kitana and Mileena, with a green color scheme. MK co-creator and character designer John Tobias felt that including hidden characters in MKII would add to its mystique after the inclusion of Reptile in the previous game, so he conceived Jade and another secret character, Smoke, by creating their color palettes while background artist Tony Goskie added images of them peeking out from behind a tree in the game's "Living Forest" stage. Tobias then created backstories for Jade and the game's other hidden characters once they were made playable in later installments.

== Appearances ==
=== Mortal Kombat games ===
In Mortal Kombat II (1993), Jade was a hidden character who played no part in the game's storyline other than appearing at the start of random fights to drop cryptic clues on how to access her, with players having to then meet specific requirements during gameplay in order to fight Jade in a secret battle. She is a green palette swap of Kitana with darker skin, and fights with increased speed and a pair of gold fans.

Jade makes her official debut as a playable character in Ultimate Mortal Kombat 3 (1995); an upgrade of Mortal Kombat 3 in which she was written as being one of Outworld emperor Shao Kahn's elite assassins along with his adopted stepdaughter Kitana, with whom she shared a close friendship. After Kitana flees to Earthrealm after killing Mileena, Shao Kahn orders Jade to bring Kitana back to him alive, forcing her to choose between disobeying her superior or betraying her close friend.

Jade is not playable again until Mortal Kombat: Deception (2004). She witnesses the deaths of Kitana and the thunder god Raiden's chosen fighters at the hands of the Deadly Alliance (Shang Tsung and Quan Chi) and their subsequent resurrection by the Dragon King Onaga. Jade is forced to imprison a brainwashed Kitana in the Edenian palace dungeon before freeing Sindel and escaping with her to Outworld, while seeking revenge against traitorous fellow Edenian Tanya, who had allied herself with Onaga. In Sindel's non-canonical ending, she and Jade locate Onaga's tomb when he sends Kitana after them. Jade battles her friend before Sindel kills Onaga, breaking Kitana from his spell and returning peace to Edenia.

In Mortal Kombat: Shaolin Monks, the 2005 beat 'em up action-adventure spinoff that retold the events of MKII, she engages Shaolin warriors Liu Kang and Kung Lao in a fight alongside Mileena and a brainwashed Kitana, and is defeated.

In Mortal Kombat, the 2011 reboot of the series, Jade was born into Edenian royalty that served Shao Kahn after he conquered the realm. Jade served as bodyguard to Princess Kitana and the two became close friends, but was under orders to kill Kitana should she become disloyal to Kahn. They initially fight against the Earthrealm warriors, but Jade soon becomes suspicious of Kitana when she attempts to discover her true heritage, which in turn leads to her capture when she confronts Shao Kahn after coming across a grotesque clone of herself named Mileena. Jade changes allegiances and helps the Earthrealm warriors free Kitana from captivity. She later joins them as they prepare to fend off Shao Kahn's invasion of Earthrealm. As Raiden and Liu Kang commune with the Elder Gods, the Lin Kuei ninja clan and Sindel attack; killing Jade and several of her allies before they are resurrected as undead revenants and enslaved in the Netherealm by Quan Chi.

Jade was not included in Mortal Kombat X (2015), with Kitana shown using Jade's weapons in one of her three gameplay variations.

Jade, as a revenant, returns in Mortal Kombat 11 (2019), serving under Kitana and Liu Kang's revenant forms in the Netherrealm after they became its new rulers in MKX as well as servant to the keeper of time Kronika. Due to her plans to erase Raiden from history however, a time anomaly she created inadvertently brought past versions of Jade and Kitana to the present. The two lend their support to its new ruler Kotal Kahn, with whom Jade shared a romantic history with before she died. While helping him track down a time-displaced Shao Kahn, during which they encountered Jade's revenant and D'vorah and Jade defeated them both, Kotal's hatred for all Tarkatans led Jade to beat him down before he would kill The innocent Tarkatans and left them both vulnerable to being captured by their quarry. She is later rescued from Skarlet by Kitana and joins her united Outworld army in confronting Shao Kahn. After Kitana becomes the new Kahn of Outworld, she and Jade take part in the final battle against Kronika and their revenant counterparts alongside the combined Earthrealm and Outworld armies.

==== Design ====
Jade was played by martial artist Katalin Zamiar, who also portrayed Kitana and Mileena. Zamiar did not return for Ultimate Mortal Kombat 3 due to legal issues with Midway, and was replaced by Becky Gable for Ultimate Mortal Kombat 3. Jade was given her own weapon, a bõ staff, to further differentiate her from Kitana and Mileena.

Like their male ninja counterparts in the Mortal Kombat games, Kitana, Mileena and Jade evolved considerably from their original palette swap designs in the three-dimensional titles, receiving distinct new designs and other features. John Vogel, who worked on story and animations for Mortal Kombat: Deception, described Jade therein as "more of stealthy ninja type of character. She's the one who sneaks around and gets information, and carries out covert activities." Much like most of the female characters, Jade was given a more revealing costume in Mortal Kombat 9, only to receive a more conservative costume again upon her return in Mortal Kombat 11.

==== Gameplay ====
Jade copied Kitana's attacks for her secret battle in Mortal Kombat II, in particular her "Fan Throw", but was extremely fast and immune to projectile attacks. Upon her playable debut in Ultimate Mortal Kombat 3, her primary weapon became a magical steel bō staff, which was also used in her Fatalities, mostly for impaling her opponents. Her projectile attack in the game was a three-pronged boomerang that players could shoot in three different forward directions through varying joystick and button combinations. Jade's body-propel attack, a kick that sees her encased in a smoking green glow, is a variant of Johnny Cage's Shadow Kick. Her projectile immunity from MKII was also reworked into a special move that lasts for several seconds. Sega Saturn Magazine's guide to Ultimate Mortal Kombat 3 described her specials as leading into "some devastating combo attacks," adding that she was especially hard to win against as the CPU-controlled opponent.

Jade's moves, along with these of Mileena and Kitana, were used in Mortal Kombat Trilogy to create the hidden composite character Khameleon. In their 1997 review of the game, GameSpot described both Jade and Noob Saibot in Trilogy as being "incredibly overpowered, with moves that run from rendering projectiles ineffective to making characters momentarily powerless." She was a non-playable boss character in Shaolin Monks, fighting alongside both Kitana and Mileena. Prima Games rated Jade an overall score of seven out of ten, higher than Kitana and Mileena, for the 2006 compilation title Mortal Kombat: Armageddon, in which she was playable along with the entire Mortal Kombat roster. For the 2011 reboot, Prima opined that her "speed, safe attacks, and savvy combo abilities put her near the top of the cast."

For Mortal Kombat X, Jade's special attacks were given to Kitana for her "Mournful" gameplay variation, described in the game as her paying tribute to "her fallen best friend" by "employing the weapons of the deceased master assassin."

=== Other appearances ===
Jade has a minor role in the novelization of the 1995 live-action film Mortal Kombat, but did not appear in the film.

Jade is a supporting character in the 1997 film Mortal Kombat Annihilation, and was portrayed by Siberian-born supermodel and actress Irina Pantaeva in her English-language film debut. She has no past relationship nor any interaction with Kitana in the film, and she secretly remains loyal to Shao Kahn while pretending to aid the Earthrealm warriors in her attempt to lead them into an ambush. Pantaeva underwent six months' fight training prior to shooting, and in a 1997 interview with Femme Fatales magazine, Pantaeva stated that "I loved my character so much that I [could] not get away from her." Tati Gabrielle played the character in Mortal Kombat II.

Jade appeared in the 2021 animated film Mortal Kombat Legends: Battle of the Realms, and was voiced by Emily O'Brien.

In the Mortal Kombat comic book series published by Malibu Comics, Jade was a recurring character in the 1995 six-issue miniseries Battlewave, in which she is simply an evil assassin paired with Smoke in serving Shao Kahn, and has no connection to Kitana or her homeland.

== Promotion and reception ==
A Jade figurine was included with a 1995 special issue of Argentinian magazine Top Kids that featured a cover story titled "Jade: mystery warrior". In 1996, a figure of Jade from Mortal Kombat Trilogy's line was released by Toy Island. A 1:6 scale limited-edition character statue was released in the Mortal Kombat "Enchanted Warriors" line by Syco Collectibles in 2012.

In his 2022 book Mortal Kombat: Games of Death, David Church remarked that when Jade and the series' other hidden characters first became playable in the "completist" titles Ultimate Mortal Kombat 3 and Mortal Kombat Trilogy, "their gameplay abilities were often poorly balanced and their backstories seem[ed] tacked onto the increasingly sprawling story world." Gavin Jasper of Den of Geek praised Jade's hidden fight in Mortal Kombat II but felt that "she doesn't really bring anything to the table afterwards" until Mortal Kombat 11, calling her romance with Kotal Kahn "a fresh romantic pairing that made sense and added a little bit of hope to Mortal Kombat 9's tragedy and the nihilism of Kronika's" plot. Chris Plante of UGO wrote in 2010 that the character "seems to fetishize Eastern culture" in that she was "equal parts exotic slave girl and Asian princess, her most powerful weapon being her sexuality. She's the mystical, foreign black widow, a relic of post-war pulp novels." Julian Beauvais of Comic Book Resources said in 2017, "For most of her time in the franchise, Jade has pretty much been defined as being the best friend of Kitana. In a series where lasting friendships are rare, that’s a cool little detail, but it also puts Jade in a role that makes her seem secondary to the princess." Reception to her Fatalities has been mixed. Leon Miller of Screen Rant wrote in 2017, "Jade compensates for a fairly boring moveset – yes, we know she wields a bō staff! – and tired, sexed-up outfit" with her "creative finishers" and "her backstory, which has seen her develop from an uncomplicated assassin in Shao Kahn’s employ into a conflicted figure ultimately redeemed by her friendship with Kitana."

Chad Hunter of Complex chose the Mortal Kombat 2011 versions of Jade and Kitana to represent the "women who fight" stereotype in his 2012 list of the fifteen most stereotypical characters in video games, describing them as "half-naked skanks who can fight, hurl lasers and perform aerobatic attacks while wearing thongs, high-heeled boots and keeping their giant breasts under scarves", which he felt had caused "female gamers [to] slide away from this series." In a 2016 thesis discussing female representation in video games, Juho Matias Puro included Jade with Street Fighter's Chun-Li and Tekken's Christie Monteiro as "hypersexualized" characters "designed to aesthetically pleasure the hypothetical male, but their sexual identity and expression are non-existent." Following the 2019 release of Mortal Kombat 11, Princess Weekes of The Mary Sue described Jade therein as a "boss" in an article discussing video games "toning down their hyper-sexual female character[s]" due to the increase in marketing to female gamers. She dismissed the designs of Jade, Kitana and Mileena in the 2011 reboot as "ridiculous" and "large breasts and cleavage for the sake of it", while her response to the criticism of Jade's more conservative redesign in MK11 was that "part of the sex appeal of the characters is watching them destroy their enemies. Watching Jade in [MK11], she has plenty of sex appeal when she disembowels her enemies." April Prince of Black Girl Nerds described the character as "a strong, beautiful dark-skinned woman who has always fought for the freedom and autonomy of her realm and for that we as the gaming world love her", and "quite the representative for dark-skinned women" who appealed to black female Mortal Kombat players. Alex Dalbey of The Daily Dot, in 2019, said of the negative reaction to the redesigns of Jade and other female characters in MK11: "This attitude that women in video games must be attractive is reflective of an entitled expectation that women in games are, in no small measure, there for straight male sexual entertainment."
