= Mortal Kombat: Onslaught =

2023 mobile video game

- North American cover art, featuring (from left to right) Sub-Zero, Raiden, Shinnok, Kitana, Scorpion, Jade, Quan Chi and Shao Kahn
- Developer: NetherRealm Studios
- Publisher: Warner Bros. Games
- Series: Mortal Kombat
- Platforms: Android; iOS
- Release: October 17, 2023
- Genres: Action-adventure, beat 'em up, role-playing
- Modes: Single-player, multiplayer

Mortal Kombat: Onslaught was a 2023 action-adventure beat 'em up role-playing video game, developed by NetherRealm Studios, released worldwide in 2023 and shut down on October 21, 2024, following the closure of the company's mobile division. A spin-off of the Mortal Kombat franchise, it is the fourth installment to not be a fighting game and combines the combat gameplay with a full cinematic storyline, reminiscent of free-to-play mobile multiplayer online battle arena games.

Developer Ed Boon stated about the development of the game, "We are pushing the boundaries of Mortal Kombat to allow players to experience the franchise in new ways, while still staying true to its core visceral nature... With Mortal Kombat: Onslaught, we reimagined Mortal Kombat into a strategic team-based collection [role-playing game] with fast-paced, group melee combat that both new and existing fans can enjoy."

The game began location testing on October 31, 2022. It was shut down on October 21, 2024, as had been announced in July following the reported closure of the company's mobile division.
