= Mortal Kombat 1 =

2023 fighting video game

- North American cover art, featuring Liu Kang
- Developer: NetherRealm Studios (Note: Windows version ported by QLOC. Nintendo Switch version ported by Shiver Entertainment and Saber Interactive.)
- Publisher: Warner Bros. Games
- Director: Ed Boon
- Designer: Paulo Garcia
- Artists: Steve Beran; Joe Berger
- Composer: Wilbert Roget II (Note: Additional music by Joel Corelitz, Stephanie Economou, Casey Edwards, Dean Grinsfelder, Dan Negovan, Dan Forden, and Nathan Grigg)
- Series: Mortal Kombat
- Engine: Unreal Engine 4
- Platforms: Nintendo Switch; PlayStation 5; Windows; Xbox Series X/S
- Release: September 19, 2023
- Genre: Fighting
- Modes: Single-player, multiplayer

Mortal Kombat 1 is a 2023 fighting game developed by NetherRealm Studios and published by Warner Bros. Games. It is the twelfth main installment in the Mortal Kombat franchise, and serves as its second reboot after 2011's Mortal Kombat. The game takes place after the events of 2019's Mortal Kombat 11, and is set in a new timeline (the third main timeline in the series' history) created by Liu Kang during his ending in 11's Aftermath expansion. In this new timeline, Liu Kang assembles a clique of fighters to participate in the latest Mortal Kombat tournament in Outworld while contending with an alliance formed by Titan Shang Tsung. In the follow-up expansion, Khaos Reigns, Liu Kang and his allies must contend with Titan Havik.

The game was released on Nintendo Switch, PlayStation 5, Windows, and Xbox Series X/S on September 19, 2023. Most versions of Mortal Kombat 1 received generally positive reviews from critics, with praise towards its visual fidelity, roster, first story mode and new mechanics, but criticism for its microtransactions and second story mode. Conversely, the Switch version was negatively received at launch for its technical issues, graphics, and long loading times. The game had sold more than 8 million copies.

== Gameplay ==
Raiden (left) and his Kameo Fighter, Frost (crouching center-left), fighting Baraka

Mortal Kombat 1 features a story mode, online multiplayer with rollback netcode, and offline gameplay, as well as cross-play and cross-progression, a first in the series. However, cross-play and cross-progression are unavailable at launch on Nintendo Switch, though cross-play support was added on February 27, 2024, while the King of the Hill online mode will support cross-play in the future. The game introduces a feature called Kameo Fighters, who provide assistance to the player during fights in a similar fashion to the tag assist fighters of the Towers of Time mode in Mortal Kombat 11. These characters are separate from the main roster and are chosen before each fight.

Fatal Blows, first introduced in Mortal Kombat 11, make a return. Like before, these can be triggered when a player's health drops below 30%, but this time they have the player and his Kameo Fighter delivering an attack in tandem. Additionally, the most significant attacks performed during the Fatal Blow are highlighted with effects like those seen in Mortal Kombat X's X-Ray moves. Also returning is the airborne combo system seen in Mortal Kombat: Armageddon and the action spin-off Mortal Kombat: Shaolin Monks.

For single-player, the game features the return of the plot-driven Story Mode and the traditional form of Towers mode from the previous games, while introducing the addition of the seasonal Invasions mode, an online mode combining fighting mechanics with board game and role-playing game elements. The players are tasked with moving around the board while completing various challenges on each space they move to, earning rewards such as skins, in-game currency, or concept art for completing the challenges. Each Invasion season lasts around six weeks and has its own board and theme. For multiplayer, the versus modes include Local mode to play a match on the same console, Online mode to play against opponents all over the world, and Tournament mode to host a tournament with a unified rule set for the matches.

Returning as an additional finishing move in a free update released alongside the Khaos Reigns expansion DLC is Animalities, first introduced in Mortal Kombat 3 and its updates Ultimate Mortal Kombat 3 and Mortal Kombat Trilogy, which allow the player to morph into an animal and maul their opponent.

== Plot ==
After defeating Kronika and Shang Tsung, (Note: As depicted in Mortal Kombat 11 (2019) and Mortal Kombat 11: Aftermath (2020), respectively) Fire God Liu Kang uses Kronika's Hourglass to recreate the universe before relinquishing control of it to Geras to become Earthrealm's protector. Over time, he forms a tenuous alliance with Outworld under the auspices of continuing the Mortal Kombat tournaments. In the present, Shang Tsung, now a powerless Outworlder, struggles to make a living selling quack medicine until he is approached by a mysterious individual named "Damashi", who reveals to him that he has the potential to become a sorcerer and that unseen forces have been working against him. Meanwhile, Liu Kang recruits farmhands Kung Lao and Raiden, financially struggling Hollywood actor Johnny Cage, and former yakuza gangster Kenshi Takahashi to compete in the latest tournament, with Raiden eventually being named Earthrealm's champion and winning the tournament.

After learning from Geras that Shang Tsung has regained his abilities and is serving as an advisor to Outworld's Empress Sindel, Liu Kang tasks Kenshi, Kung Lao, and Johnny with investigating Shang Tsung's activities. They travel to Outworld's wastelands, where they encounter Tarkatans, victims of the Tarkat virus outbreak, and witness Shang Tsung extracting bone marrow from the Tarkatans' leader Baraka. The Earthrealmers intervene, though Shang Tsung escapes to his laboratory. With Baraka's aid, the group locates the lab and stops Shang Tsung from seemingly infecting Outworld's crown princess, Mileena, with the Tarkat virus. However, Mileena attacks them, blinding Kenshi before Shang Tsung injects her with a serum to control her Tarkat symptoms. Her sister, Princess Kitana, and General Shao arrive to capture the Earthrealmers. Shang Tsung misleads them before convening with his ally and fellow sorcerer Quan Chi. The Earthrealmers and Baraka are taken to the Flesh Pits, but escape with help of Reptile, a shapeshifting outcast, and encounter Ashrah, a Netherrealm Demoness in search of absolution, who reveals that Quan Chi is building devices capable of stealing souls on a massive scale. Though Quan Chi uses several souls to create Ermac, the group defeats them and destroys one of the soul stealers before all except for Baraka return to Earthrealm to warn Liu Kang.

Liu Kang orders Lin Kuei warriors Sub-Zero, Scorpion, and Smoke to destroy the soul stealers and capture Shang Tsung, but Shang Tsung sways Sub-Zero to his side by promising him access to the undead Dragon Army. As Scorpion and Smoke escape, Geras, upon further investigation, informs Liu Kang that "Damashi" hails from a parallel timeline.

With Constable Li Mei's help, Liu Kang returns to Outworld to provide Sindel and her daughters with evidence of the sorcerers' treachery and reveal his influence on the current timeline. Shao attempts to ambush the group, but is defeated and captured. The Earthrealmers and Outworlders team up to destroy the remaining soul stealers, only to be ambushed by Ermac. Mileena defeats him, allowing the soul of her father and Sindel's husband, Emperor Jerrod, to manifest and take control of Ermac's body. Upon confronting the sorcerers, they are joined by "Damashi", who is revealed to be the previous timeline's Shang Tsung. He reveals further that while fighting Liu Kang for the Hourglass, they fractured time, creating a separate timeline where he defeated Kronika and Liu Kang and became a Titan. Intending to absorb Liu Kang's timeline, he betrays the sorcerers and summons warriors from his own. Liu Kang's group narrowly drives them off, though Sindel is fatally wounded and appoints Mileena her successor before dying and having her soul absorbed by Jerrod.

Forming a temporary alliance to deal with the threat, Shang Tsung hypothesizes that there are more timelines outside his counterpart's knowledge. Geras adds that he had stored Liu Kang's Titan powers should the need for them arise. As the others leave to destroy the Dragon Army, Liu Kang regains his Titan powers and reunites with his friends from the previous timeline to recruit forces for the upcoming battle. Anticipating this, Titan Shang Tsung summons an army of their evil counterparts. Following a grueling battle, Liu Kang's group prevails, allowing him to erase Titan Shang Tsung and his timeline from existence. After returning everyone he recruited to their native timelines, Liu Kang returns to his own to congratulate his champions over dinner before departing to assist Scorpion and Smoke in founding the Shirai Ryu clan and preparing Earthrealm for future conflicts.

In a mid-credits scene, alternate timeline warriors led by Titan Havik observe the aftermath of Liu Kang and Titan Shang Tsung's battle. Feeling it ended too quickly, Titan Havik vows to start a new, longer battle.

=== Khaos Reigns ===
Sub-Zero leads the Lin Kuei in an ambush on the Shirai Ryu during the wedding of Scorpion and Harumi alongside two of his armored warriors, Sektor and Cyrax, the latter of whom he deceived into believing Scorpion and Liu Kang had betrayed Earthrealm. After learning of Sub-Zero's deception, Cyrax turns on him and helps the Shirai Ryu and wedding guests fend off the Lin Kuei and capture Sub-Zero and Sektor, though Scorpion refuses to forgive Cyrax despite showing mercy at Harumi's behest. Due to them aiding and abetting Shao's rebellion, Liu Kang takes Sub-Zero and Sektor to be judged by Mileena and attempts to convince her to spare them to mend further conflict.

During the negotiation, they are attacked by Titan Havik, who previously fought alongside Titan Shang Tsung and now seeks to merge other timelines with his own. As his Khaosrealm warriors capture Geras, Sub-Zero pursues them, only to be captured too. He soon learns from Havik that he intends to combine Geras' time crystals with six artifacts called the Kamidogu to destroy the multiverse and reshape it in his image before experimenting on Sub-Zero.

Knowing he and Mileena must remain in their timeline to protect it, Liu Kang sends Scorpion, Cyrax, and Sektor to Khaosrealm to rescue Geras. There, they ally themselves with three members of a rebellion against Havik: Lieutenant Colonel Johnathan Cage of a WWII-esque timeline and Emperor Rain and Empress Tanya, who had been deposed when Havik's forces absorbed their timeline. Havik traps them in a deadly maze, where Rain sacrifices himself to save Sektor and Tanya. After Tanya negotiates with a trapped, powerful dragon named Orin, they are able to escape and infiltrate Havik's citadel. There, they encounter Sub-Zero, who has been transformed by Havik into a dark being of chaos called Noob Saibot. After defeating Saibot, they rescue Geras and escape with him and the Kamidogu.

Liu Kang is unable to cure Saibot of his condition, but manages to free him from Havik's control. Havik and his forces invade Liu Kang's timeline, where he steals back and empowers himself with the Kamidogu. Nonetheless, Saibot and Liu Kang defeat him. Saibot attempts to kill him, but Liu Kang and Geras stop him to protect the survivors of Havik's destruction. Liu Kang allows Sektor to leave and become the Lin Kuei's grandmaster while promising to find a way to restore Saibot, keeping him at the Temple of the Elements for safety in the meantime. Scorpion ultimately forgives Cyrax for her transgressions and invites her to join the Shirai Ryu.

== Characters ==
The base roster of Mortal Kombat 1 features 22 playable characters, all of them featured in past Mortal Kombat games, including several who have not appeared since Mortal Kombat: Armageddon (2006). An additional character, Shang Tsung, was offered as a pre-order bonus. Two "Kombat Packs" were subsequently released, each with six new playable characters, 3 of them being guest characters. The first pack also includes a skin for Johnny Cage featuring the likeness and voice of Jean-Claude Van Damme. The second pack was released with the introduction of the "Khaos Reigns" expansion, featuring three reimagined original characters made for the story mode, in addition to three guest characters released later. Characters listed in italics are guest characters.

Characters in Mortal Kombat 1
Base Roster				Kombat Pack 1	Khaos Reigns
Ashrah; Baraka; General Shao; Geras; Havik (Note: Unlockable via completion of Story Mode.); Johnny Cage	Kenshi; Kitana; Kung Lao; Li Mei; Liu Kang; Mileena	Nitara; Raiden; Rain; Reiko; Reptile; Scorpion	Shang Tsung (Note: Available as a preorder bonus, and later via online purchase.); Sindel; Smoke; Sub-Zero; Tanya	Ermac; Homelander; Omni-Man; Peacemaker; Quan Chi; Takeda	Conan the Barbarian; Cyrax; Ghostface; Noob Saibot; Sektor; T-1000

Several other characters make non-playable appearances throughout the game; evil versions of Cassie Cage, Kung Jin, and Jacqui Briggs appear alongside Takeda during the Battle of Armageddon in the Story Mode, while Kollector appears as a shopkeeper in the game's Invasions mode.

=== Kameo Fighters ===
A new element introduced in this game are Kameo Fighters, which are a unique roster of partner characters that assist the main fighters with brief interventions during matches. The base game includes 15 Kameo Fighters, with an additional six added later to the game as downloadable content, all drawn from throughout the Mortal Kombat franchise as well as two new characters listed in Bold. These characters are chosen separately from the main roster of fighters. Some Kameo Fighters appear as supporting characters in the Story Mode, and some main roster fighters also have a Kameo counterpart.

Kameo Fighters in Mortal Kombat 1
Base Roster			Kombat Pack 1	Khaos Reigns
Cyrax; Darrius; Frost; Goro; Jax	Kano; Kung Lao (Note: Unlockable via player profile level up.); Motaro; Sareena; Scorpion	Sektor; Shujinko; Sonya Blade; Stryker; Sub-Zero	Ferra; **Janet Cage**; Khameleon; Mavado; Tremor	**Madam Bo**

Each Kameo Fighter can provide two types of assists: Summons, which can be performed while the player remains in one place, and Ambushes, which can be performed regardless of what the player is doing. They can also be called in to perform their own Fatalities and Brutalities. In addition, the chosen Kameo Fighter also affects how much health the players will have in a fight.

== Development ==
After ceasing support for Mortal Kombat 11 (2019), NetherRealm Studios disclosed that it was working on a new project in July 2021. Johnny Cage voice actor Andrew Bowen indicated that the 12th installment was in development in a hastily deleted tweet. In February 2023, Warner Bros. Discovery CEO David Zaslav announced during a 2022 fourth-quarter earnings call that a twelfth installment in the series was set to be released later in that year.

On May 18, 2023, NetherRealm Studios announced Mortal Kombat 1 with a release date of September 19, 2023. It is the second reboot of the series and is set in the New Era timeline created by Liu Kang after he attained godhood in Mortal Kombat 11. NetherRealm Studios announced that those who preorder any version of the game for the PlayStation 5 and Xbox Series X/S would receive access to a beta in August, and after the game launches, NetherRealm Studios would provide cross-platform play and cross-progression. The PlayStation 5 and Xbox Series X/S versions of the game were developed by NetherRealm Studios, the Windows version by QLOC, and the Nintendo Switch version by Shiver Entertainment (who previously developed the Nintendo Switch port for Mortal Kombat 11) and Saber Interactive.

=== Marketing ===
In August 2023, Dave Bautista appeared in a trailer homaging the 1993 "Mortal Monday" commercial for the original Mortal Kombat (1992). The following month, actress Megan Fox was revealed to be voicing Nitara, her performance was met with a very poor reception by players upon release.

== Release ==
Mortal Kombat 1 was released for Nintendo Switch, PlayStation 5, Windows, and Xbox Series X/S on September 14, 2023, for those who have ordered the game's Kollector's Edition and Premium Edition, while purchasers of the Standard Edition were able to access the game on September 19, 2023.

=== Downloadable content ===
A skin for Johnny Cage based on the likeness of Jean-Claude Van Damme is available as premium downloadable content; the developers had previously sought to have Van Damme portray Cage in the original Mortal Kombat. The first Kombat Pack was announced during San Diego Comic-Con 2023, consisting of three returning characters from Mortal Kombat X in 2015; Ermac, Quan Chi, Takeda and three additional guest characters; Omni-Man from the Invincible series by Image Comics, Peacemaker from DC Comics, and Homelander from The Boys by Dynamite Entertainment. Details for the entire pack were previously leaked through a listing on Amazon Italy.

To coincide with the trailer for the second season of the animated series Invincible (2023–2024), actor J.K. Simmons was announced to reprise his role of Omni-Man from the series. In August 2023, voice actor Jamieson Price was revealed to be reprising his role of Ermac from Mortal Kombat X. Later that same month during Gamescom 2023, Boon confirmed John Cena would voice Peacemaker, after portraying the character from both the 2021 film The Suicide Squad and the television series Peacemaker (2022–2025). Shortly around the game's release, Ed Boon revealed that there was an attempt to get John Wick as a potential guest character, alongside actor Keanu Reeves as a skin for Kenshi. In November 2023, actor Antony Starr revealed he would not be reprising his role as Homelander from the television series The Boys (2019–2026) for the DLC through an Instagram comment. In June 2024, coinciding with the release of the fourth season, Jake Green was revealed to be the new actor voicing the character. Moreover, Ed Boon revealed there was an attempt to get Michonne from The Walking Dead as a guest character before they went with Omni-Man.

During a panel at San Diego Comic Con 2024, a DLC story expansion called Khaos Reigns was revealed, which contains a fighter pack featuring six new playable characters. Noob Saibot and female versions of Sektor and Cyrax, were released on September 24, 2024, along with the expansion, while guest characters Ghostface from the Scream franchise, Conan the Barbarian from his self-titled 1982 film, and the T-1000 from Terminator 2: Judgment Day (1991) were announced during the same presentation and released at later dates. Roger L. Jackson reprised his voiced role as Ghostface while Skeet Ulrich, who played Billy Loomis in the first film, provides his likeness for the character in brief moments that Ghostface is unmasked. Robert Patrick reprises his role as both the facial model and voice actor for the T-1000 while Arnold Schwarzenegger provides his likeness for Conan, who is voiced by Chris Cox who previously voiced the T-800 in Mortal Kombat 11.

Coinciding with the release of the Conan character on January 21, 2025, an update featured a new character being a pink-colored ninja named Floyd as a non-playable secret boss as his color scheme is a direct reference to the band Pink Floyd as his namesake. Similar to Reptile in the original Mortal Kombat and Smoke and Noob Saibot in Mortal Kombat II, he is fought after completing various challenges and utilizes moves from all of the other male ninjas, much like Chameleon from earlier titles.

On May 14, 2025, NetherRealm Studios released Mortal Kombat 1: Definitive Edition, a version containing all post-launch content, including Kombat Pack 1 and Kombat Pack 2, the "Khaos Reigns" story expansion, and previously released pre-order and additional cosmetic items. The development team subsequently confirmed that, while they would be continuing to support the game, no further DLC characters or story chapters were planned, instead shifting their focus to their next project.

== Reception ==
Reception

Aggregate scores
Aggregator	Score
Metacritic	(PC) 82/100 (PS5) 83/100 (XSXS) 84/100
OpenCritic	87% recommend (Note: Based on 148 reviews)

Review scores
Publication	Score
Destructoid	8/10
Digital Trends	3.5/5
Eurogamer	3/5
Game Informer	9/10
GameSpot	8/10
GamesRadar+	5/5
Hardcore Gamer	3.5/5
IGN	8/10 (NS) 3/10
Jeuxvideo.com	16/20
Nintendo Life	(NS) 4/10
PC Gamer (US)	70/100
PCGamesN	8/10
PCMag	4.5/5
Push Square	7/10
Shacknews	9/10
TouchArcade	3.5/5
Video Games Chronicle	5/5
VG247	4/5
VideoGamer.com	9/10

Mortal Kombat 1 received "generally favorable reviews" from critics, according to review aggregator Metacritic. 87% of critics recommended the game on review aggregator OpenCritic.

The Nintendo Switch version was critically panned upon release for its poor graphical quality, extensive load times, poor performance, and numerous bugs. Mitchell Saltzman of IGN, who had given the version on PlayStation 5 an 8 out of 10, gave the Switch port a 3, stating, "There's a hint of a great fighting game still peeking through the blurry backgrounds, but its horrendous load times, inconsistent framerate, muddy visuals, and plethora of bugs make the Switch version an altogether aggravating way to play what is a great fighting game on other platforms."

To address the Switch's version launch issues and NetherRealm Studios' commitment to the Switch version, series creator Ed Boon addressed media outlets like BBC Newsbeat that "Anything that we see that is not acceptable will absolutely be addressed," and "[the Switch version] will be supported, like we did with Mortal Kombat 11!"

=== Controversies ===
Due to its violence and gore, Mortal Kombat 1 is banned in Japan, South Korea and China.

=== Sales ===
On January 27, 2024, Warner Bros. Games announced that Mortal Kombat 1 had sold 3 million units. By August 2024, the game had sold more than 4 million copies. It was the eighth best-selling video game in the US in 2023. By January 2025, it was reported that the game has surpassed the sales number of 5 million copies. As of August 2025, the game has sold over 6 million copies. As of April 2026, the game has sold over 8 million units.

=== Accolades ===
Awards and nominations
Year	Ceremony	Category	Result	Ref.
2023	Golden Joystick Awards	Best Multiplayer Game	Won	
2023	Golden Joystick Awards	Best Game Trailer ("It's In Our Blood" trailer)	Nominated	
2023	The Game Awards 2023	Best Fighting Game	Nominated	
2023	The Game Awards 2023	Innovation in Accessibility	Nominated	
2023	Equinox Awards 2023	Best Multiplayer Game	Nominated	
2023	Equinox Awards 2023	Best Acting (Portuguese) (Marcelo Salsicha - Johnny Cage)	Nominated	
2024	Game Audio Network Guild Awards	Audio of the Year	Nominated	
2024	Game Audio Network Guild Awards	Best Audio Mix	Nominated	
2024	Game Audio Network Guild Awards	Best Cinematic & Cut Scene Audio	Nominated	
2024	Game Audio Network Guild Awards	Best Main Theme	Nominated	
2024	Game Audio Network Guild Awards	Best Original Song	Nominated	
2024	Game Audio Network Guild Awards	Best Original Soundtrack Album	Nominated	
2024	Game Audio Network Guild Awards	Music of the Year	Nominated	
2024	Game Audio Network Guild Awards	Sound Design of the Year	Nominated	
2024	27th Annual D.I.C.E. Awards	Fighting Game of the Year	Nominated	
2024	27th Annual D.I.C.E. Awards	Outstanding Achievement in Animation	Nominated	
2024	22nd Visual Effects Society Awards	Outstanding Visual Effects in a Real-Time Project	Nominated	
2024	24th Golden Trailer Awards	Best Video Game Trailer ("Answer the Call" trailer)	Nominated	
2024	National Academy of Video Game Trade Reviewers (NAVGTR) Awards 2023	Game, Fighting	Nominated	
2024	Can I Play That Awards 2023	Barrier Breaker (NetherRealm Studios)	Won	
2024	Can I Play That Awards 2023	AbilityPoints Diamond Award	Won	
2025	28th Annual D.I.C.E. Awards	Fighting Game of the Year (Khaos Reigns)	Nominated	

== In other media ==
In-game footage of Mortal Kombat 1 was featured in the episode "The Iron Pot" of Creature Commandos.

Erik Campbell is seen playing Mortal Kombat 1 in Final Destination Bloodlines.
