= Scorpion (Mortal Kombat) =

Mortal Kombat character

- Mortal Kombat character
- Scorpion in Mortal Kombat 1 (2023)
- First appearance: Mortal Kombat (1992)
- Created by: Ed Boon; John Tobias
- Designed by: Various: John Tobias (early games); Luis Mangubat (MK:DA, MK:D); Mark Lappin (MK:SM); Cy Mandua (MK9)
- Voiced by: Various: Ed Boon (1992–present, "GET OVER HERE!" and "COME HERE!" voice clips); Hanzo Hasashi: Simeon Norfleet (MK:A); Patrick Seitz (2008–2022); Ron Yuan (MK11, MKO); Kuai Liang: Daisuke Tsuji (MK1)
- Portrayed by: Various: Chris Casamassa (1995 film); J. J. Perry (Annihilation); Ian Anthony Dale (short film, web series); Hiroyuki Sanada (2021 film)
- Motion capture: Various: Daniel Pesina (MK, MKII); John Turk (UMK3); Sal Divita (MKM:SZ); Nico Millado (MK11); Noah Fleder (MK1); Carlos Pesina (MK1)

In-universe information
- Full name: Hanzo Hasashi (MK–MK11); Kuai Liang (MK1)
- Species: Wraith (1st Timeline); Human (2nd and 3rd Timeline)
- Weapon: Rope dart
- Family: Hanzo Hasashi: Harumi Hasashi (wife, deceased); Satoshi Hasashi (son, deceased); Kuai Liang: Bi-Han (brother); Tomas Vrbada (adoptive brother); Harumi Shirai (wife)
- Nationality: Japanese (MK–MK11); Chinese (MK1)

Scorpion is a character in the Mortal Kombat fighting game franchise by Midway Games and NetherRealm Studios. A ninja dressed in yellow, his primary weapon is a rope dart, which he uses to harpoon opponents. Since his debut in the original 1992 game, Scorpion has appeared as a playable character in every main installment except Mortal Kombat 3 (1995).

The series' original Scorpion is Hanzo Hasashi (Japanese: 波佐志 半蔵), an undead Japanese warrior principally defined by his quest to avenge the deaths of himself, his family, and his clan. After the death of Bi-Han / Sub-Zero, Hasashi develops a feud with whom he believed to be the killer, Bi-Han's younger brother and second Sub-Zero, Kuai Liang, that spans most of the franchise before discovering the sorcerer Quan Chi is the real murderer. While Hasashi has been depicted as a neutral figure focused primarily on seeking revenge, he will side with those who can help him achieve his goals. Following two reboots, Kuai Liang (Chinese: 奎凉; pinyin: Kúi Liáng) becomes the new Scorpion in Mortal Kombat 1 (2023), while alternate timeline variants of Hasashi make minor appearances. Scorpion has remained a pop culture icon, receiving critical acclaim since his debut and frequently appears in media outside of the games.

== Character creation ==
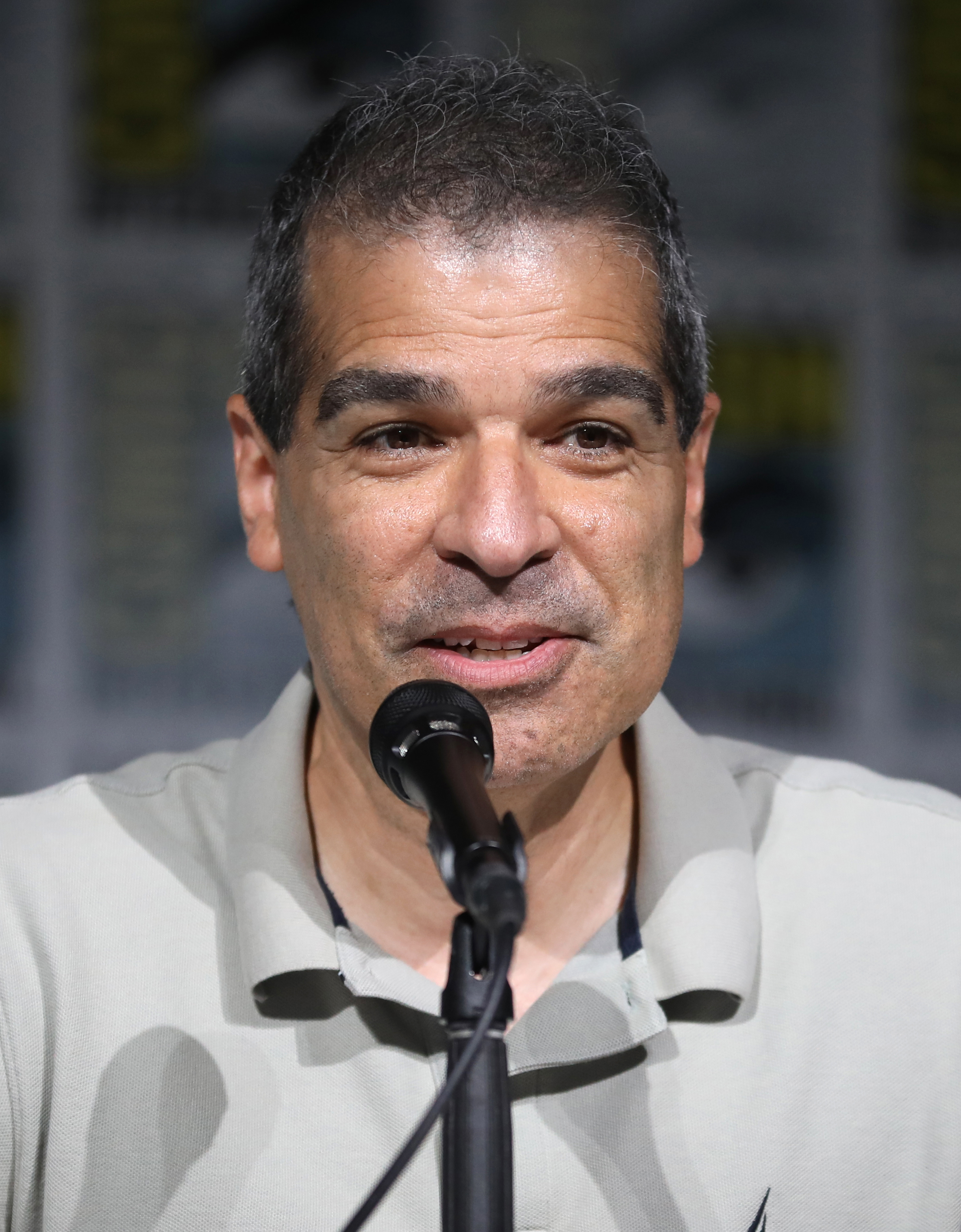
Mortal Kombat co-creator Ed Boon has voiced Scorpion in several games and media appearances.

Scorpion appeared in the first Mortal Kombat as one of three palette-swapped ninja characters, along with Sub-Zero and Reptile. His early origins were revealed by the series' original chief character designer, John Tobias, in September 2011, when he posted several pages of old pre-production character sketches and notes on Twitter. Scorpion and Sub-Zero were simply described as "[a] palette swap for 2 ninjas—a hunter and the hunted," while Tobias also considered the concepts of either one of them fleeing their clan or a "revenge story" involving the then-unnamed characters being part of rival clans. In regards to the game's strict memory limitations, co-creator and programmer Ed Boon recalled: "A lot of attention went into the economics of it, and so we knew that if we could take a character and change their color and use basically the same memory to create two characters, we'd save a lot of money and we'd have two characters."

Scorpion yells one of two taunts — "Get over here!" and "Come here!" — at his opponents when he hits them with his spear. They were voiced by Boon in the games and feature films, but only one of them ("Come here!") was included in the home ports of MK and MKII due to memory constraints. According to Boon, the second of the character's phrases originated because he thought "it would be funny to have him yell out 'Get over here!' when he [threw the spear]," and he was thus encouraged to get behind the studio microphone and record the taunts. Twenty years after the first MK game's release, Boon included creating the spear move as well as the character itself among his personal high points of the franchise's history, adding: "I remember people sitting in my office all day just doing this uppercut [on a speared enemy] again and again, like 'Oh my God, that feels so good.' It just became the cornerstone of [the game]." MKII saw the debut of the phrase "Toasty!", which was voiced by series sound designer Dan Forden during a variation of Scorpion's "Flaming Skull" Fatality or at random when any of the game's characters landed an uppercut. According to Tobias, it first originated as "You're Toast!", which was a taunt bandied among the designers during game-testing sessions.

=== Design ===
Scorpion was given a yellow palette because the developers decided it symbolized fire in contrast to Sub-Zero's ice blue. Their similar appearance but opposite nature "prompted the story behind them being these opposing ninja-clan-type characters." A third ninja swap, Reptile, was added in the third revision as a hidden non-playable character who was outfitted in green and used Scorpion's spear (along with Sub-Zero's freeze) as part of his offensive arsenal; he was devised by Boon as "a cooler version of Scorpion." The original costume was created from a modified ninja-like outfit bought at a Chicago costume shop and was red for filming in the first game, but a different yellow one with a quilted vest and knee-high shin guards was utilized for Mortal Kombat II. This in turn made the other male ninja characters therein—Sub-Zero, Reptile, and hidden characters Smoke and Noob Saibot—palette swaps of Scorpion, with the latter two also using Scorpion's spear when players fought them separately in secret battles. Scorpion and the ninja characters were first played by Daniel Pesina, who was replaced by John Turk for Ultimate Mortal Kombat 3 and the 1996 compilation Mortal Kombat Trilogy, while Sal Divita played the character in MK: Mythologies.

While his ninja-outfit template from the first generation of games has remained relatively unchanged over time, the improved graphics of the post-Mortal Kombat 4 three-dimensional releases have allowed more details to better differentiate the male ninja characters, and Scorpion's costumes were duly enhanced with objects such as two katana swords strapped to his back and his spear attached to a rope tied to his belt in Deadly Alliance, and a set of ornate shoulder epaulets in Deception, in which his alternate costume was a throwback to the two-dimensional MK titles. Scorpion's MK2011 costume was inspired by his namesake, such as the character's abdomen-shaped shoulder pads, the two stinger-handled swords crisscrossed on his back, and the exoskeletal pattern on his hard-shell face mask. Scorpion was included with Sub-Zero, Reptile, and Ermac in a bundle of classic costumes from the first Mortal Kombat that was released as downloadable content for the 2011 reboot. For Injustice: Gods Among Us, he received a new costume designed by comic artist Jim Lee. In the original Mortal Kombat's fighter-selection screen, Scorpion had regular human eyes, as his identity as a resurrected specter was meant to be a mystery, but he was given solid yellow or white eyes for every release thereafter starting with MKII, while actors portraying Scorpion in live-action media such as the feature films and the Mortal Kombat: Legacy web series were outfitted with opaque contact lenses in order to achieve this effect.

=== Gameplay ===
Scorpion's signature special move throughout the series has him hurling a harpoon-like spear attached to a length of rope at his opponents. The spear impales his opponents through the chest before Scorpion pulls them in to close range for a free hit. His other incumbent special move throughout the series, save for Deadly Alliance, has been his Teleport Punch, where he flies offscreen during battle and then reappears to strike his opponent from behind. Scorpion additionally gained a new leg-takedown maneuver in MKII that was not well-received (Sega Saturn Magazine called it a "ridiculous" move that "no one ever used"). He was considered a lower-tier character by GamePro in their 1993 MKII character rankings, rating him eighth out of the game's twelve playables and describing both him and Sub-Zero as "formerly a top-tier character [who] doesn't have much of a chance in MKII since all of the male ninjas have some poor matchups," with Scorpion faring the worst against Jax and Mileena.

Ed Lomas of Sega Saturn Magazine described the character as having "simple yet effective" special moves in UMK3 that "make him good for beginners, [which] doesn't stop him from being a useful character," while his "trusty" spear was "perfect for setting up combos." GameSpy, in their Deception walkthrough, described the character as "a well-rounded character that has strengths in combos as well as in special and normal moves." They additionally described the spear as "useful as ever" in Armageddon, adding, "Between [that and his] other special moves ... Scorpion pretty much has everything covered." Prima Games' MK2011 strategy guide considered Scorpion to be well-balanced with no distinct weaknesses or advantages, while winning more than half of his fights against the game's other characters. He is also a playable character for both the versus and story modes in Shaolin Monks, where his move sets in this game are largely identical to Liu Kang's with some original techniques.

Scorpion's signature finishing move from the original game up until Mortal Kombat 4 was his "Fire Breath" Fatality, in which he removed his ninja hood and face like a mask to reveal a skull right before immolating his opponent. A variation of this finisher was included in MKII: entering a different button/joystick combination added the spoken "Toasty!" phrase that simultaneously appeared on the screen. While the "Fire Breath" was brought back for Mortal Kombat vs. DC Universe in 2008, his spear has otherwise served as his primary tool in his fatalities in the three-dimensional games, from impaling his opponents through the head and then decapitating them in Deadly Alliance, using it to yank off their limbs in Deception, and plunging it into their chest before kicking them through a portal that left nothing but a skinned corpse hanging from the spear's chain in MK2011 ("Nether Gate"). His second Fatality in the reboot, "Split Decision", had Scorpion using one of his back-mounted swords to hack his opponent to pieces.

Scorpion would indirectly play a role in the fabrication of the then-nonexistent character Ermac when Electronic Gaming Monthly published a doctored screenshot of Scorpion from the original game in 1993. This subsequently spawned false player rumors of a glitch that would turn Scorpion's sprite red, with the name "Error Macro" appearing in the energy bar. Ermac became playable in UMK3, in which he was a red palette swap of Scorpion who shared his Teleport Punch.

== Appearances ==
=== Midway games ===
First appearing in Mortal Kombat (1992), Scorpion is a warrior with a wife and child who was killed by the ninja Sub-Zero and becomes an undead specter to seek revenge by killing him in turn. In Mortal Kombat II (1993), Scorpion believes Sub-Zero is alive until he realizes it is his younger brother, Kuai Liang, causing him to seek redemption. In Ultimate Mortal Kombat 3, Emperor Shao Kahn enlists Scorpion's aid, but the latter eventually defects to Earthrealm's defenders due to his work pitting him against Kuai Liang.

Appearing as a boss in the prequel Mortal Kombat Mythologies: Sub-Zero (1997), Scorpion's history is expanded on. Years prior, Hanzo Hasashi was a Shirai Ryu clan ninja who was enlisted by the sorcerer Quan Chi to find a map hidden in a Shaolin temple, unaware that the sorcerer also tasked Bi-Han of the rival Lin Kuei clan with the same task. During their subsequent fight, Bi-Han kills Hasashi, allowing Quan Chi to slaughter the Shirai Ryu and Hasashi's wife Harumi and son Satoshi. Following this, Quan Chi resurrects Hasashi as Scorpion. Additionally, Scorpion appears as a boss in Mortal Kombat: Shaolin Monks (2005), which serves as an alternate take on Mortal Kombat II and sees him attempting to kill Liu Kang and Kung Lao.

In Mortal Kombat 4 (1997), Quan Chi sends Scorpion to kill Kuai Liang, only for Scorpion to learn the truth behind his clan and family's deaths and drag Quan Chi to the Netherrealm. In Mortal Kombat: Deadly Alliance (2002) and Mortal Kombat: Deception (2004), Scorpion loses Quan Chi, but escapes the Netherrealm, becomes a servant to the Elder Gods, and joins Earthrealm's defenders in fighting the dragon king Onaga. In Mortal Kombat: Armageddon (2006), Scorpion serves the Elder Gods in exchange for them resurrecting the Shirai Ryu and his family, only for the Elder Gods to turn them into undead beings. Enraged by this, Scorpion seeks the elemental Blaze's power to destroy them, but is defeated by the protagonist Taven.

=== Netherrealm Studios games ===
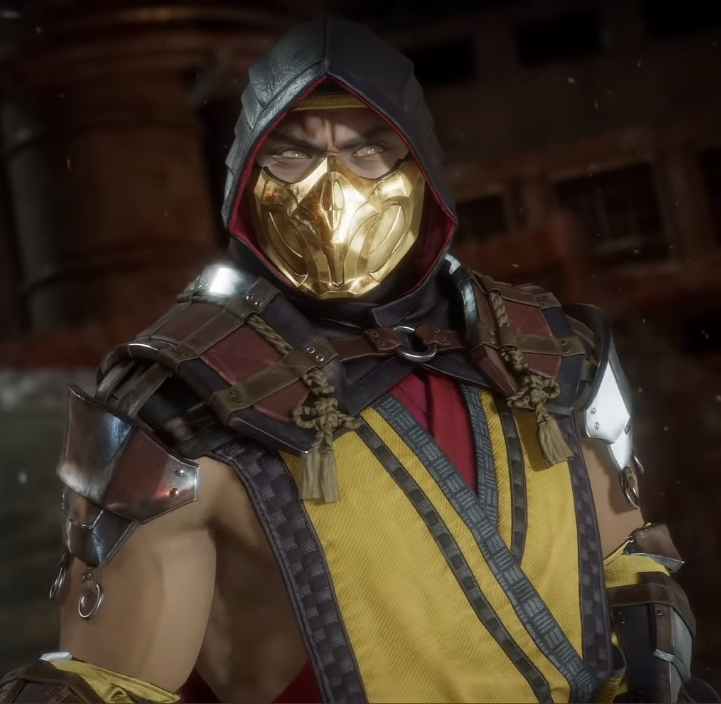
Scorpion in Mortal Kombat 11

In Mortal Kombat (2011), Earthrealm defender Raiden tries to convince Scorpion to spare Bi-Han in exchange for the Elder Gods resurrecting the Shirai Ryu and his family, but Quan Chi provokes Scorpion into killing Bi-Han. This leads to Scorpion becoming a recurring enemy to the protagonists. In Mortal Kombat X (2015), Scorpion continues to serve Quan Chi until Raiden and his allies restore his human form and free him from the necromancer's control. Over the course of the following two decades, Scorpion reforms the Shirai Ryu and forms several alliances until he can kill Quan Chi and enact his true revenge. As of Mortal Kombat 11 (2019), Kronika brings a past version of Scorpion to the present and recruits him, promising to resurrect his clan and family. Upon learning of this, Scorpion joins forces to oppose Kronika's soldier. Hasashi convinces his younger self to defect to Earthrealm's side but is killed by Kronika's agent, D'Vorah. The past Scorpion agrees to help Earthrealm's defenders stop Kronika in his stead.

Four incarnations of Scorpion appear in Mortal Kombat 1, with "Kuai Liang" appearing as a playable character and via the story mode; Hasashi as an assist character, or "Kameo Fighter", and an alternate timeline variant via the "Invasions" mode; and a variant of Harumi, also via the "Invasions" mode. In the aforementioned story mode, Fire God Liu Kang creates a third new timeline, where Kuai Liang became Scorpion. After Bi-Han betrays them to join forces with Shang Tsung and learns Bi-Han allowed their father to die, Kuai Liang and Smoke leave the Lin Kuei and escape to Japan. There, they gain Harumi's help in founding the Shirai Ryu clan and becoming Earthrealm's new guardians. Additionally, Hasashi appears in Smoke's ending, in which he is a young thief who the latter recruits into the Shirai Ryu. In the "Khaos Reigns" DLC, Bi-Han leads an ambush on the Shirai Ryu during Kuai Liang's marriage to Harumi, but they are able to fend them off after Scorpion reveals Bi-Han's deception to Cyrax. He later works with Cyrax and Sektor to rescue Geras and Bi-Han from Titan Havik, discovering the latter had been transformed into Noob Saibot in the process. After Titan Havik's defeat, Kuai Liang forgives Cyrax for her role in the wedding ambush and allows her to join the Shirai Ryu. In the first season of the "Invasions" mode, a variant of Hasashi / Scorpion travels across multiple timelines to find a living version of Harumi before Liu Kang sends him to one where he died and Harumi became Scorpion.

=== Other games ===
Hanzo Hasashi / Scorpion appears as a playable character in Mortal Kombat vs. DC Universe (2008); a guest character in NBA Jam Tournament Edition (1995), The Grid (2000), MLB Slugfest: Loaded (2004), and Psi-Ops: The Mindgate Conspiracy (2004); and a downloadable playable character in Injustice: Gods Among Us. He was added to Fortnite Battle Royale on March 29, 2025, as a purchasable skin alongside two fellow fighters Kitana and Raiden, with Sub-Zero already existing as part of the then current season's Battle Pass.

== Other media ==
=== Literature ===
Scorpion appears in Malibu Comics' Mortal Kombat miniseries "Blood and Thunder" (1994) and Battlewave (1995). This version is a regular specter who wields a morning star. In the former, he seeks to solve all the riddles inside Shang Tsung's mystical tome, the Tao Te Zhan, in order to gain absolute power. In the latter, Shao Kahn uses a mystical gem called the Deathstone to restore Scorpion's human form and place him in charge of an undead army. Additionally, Scorpion appears in DC Comics' Mortal Kombat X: Blood Ties (2015).

Scorpion appears in the non-canon prequel novel Mortal Kombat (1995), written by Jeff Rovin and set before the events of the first game. This version is a young man who acquires his powers after the soul of his deceased father merges with his body in the hopes of using it as a vessel to seek revenge against Sub-Zero for his murder.

=== Film and television ===
Hanzo Hasashi / Scorpion makes minor appearances in Mortal Kombat (1995) and Mortal Kombat Annihilation (1997), portrayed by Chris Casamassa in the former and J. J. Perry in the latter. This version works for Shang Tsung. Additionally, Scorpion makes a non-speaking appearance in the prequel, Mortal Kombat: The Journey Begins. In the 1995 film, Shang tsung implies that both he and Sub-Zero are under his control, and not fighting of their own free will. Scorpion is defeated by Johnny Cage in the film, though his status as an undead revenant leaves his ultimate fate ambiguous.

Hanzo Hasashi / Scorpion appears in the Mortal Kombat: Defenders of the Realm episode "Sting of the Scorpion". This version is an independent entity who wields a length of chain tipped with a snake-like head.

An original incarnation of Scorpion appears in the Mortal Kombat: Conquest episode "The Serpent and the Ice", portrayed again by Chris Casamassa. This version comes from the Great Kung Lao's time period and was in a relationship with a woman named Peron. Additionally, he displays a rivalry with his time's Sub-Zero, which stems from Peron killing the latter's sister, leading to Sub-Zero killing Peron in turn.

Hanzo Hasashi appears in Mortal Kombat: Rebirth, portrayed by Ian Anthony Dale. This version is a voluntary prisoner of the Deacon City Police Department.

Hanzo Hasashi / Scorpion appears in Mortal Kombat: Legacy, portrayed again by Ian Anthony Dale. In flashbacks, he was a family man who served as the Shirai Ryu's leader and worked to train his son, Jubei. Additionally, he was a childhood friend of Bi-Han / Sub-Zero of the Lin Kuei clan before their mutual hatred towards each other's clans drove them apart. Two decades later, their clans have formed a truce. Though Hasashi killed Bi-Han's younger brother Kuai Liang off-screen, they attempted to maintain their truce until Quan Chi assumed Bi-Han's form and killed Hasashi's clan and family before killing Hasashi himself so the necromancer could resurrect him as his undead servant. Dale, who has a background in kung fu, said that after rehearsals, his "arms and shoulders felt like they had daggers in them", while the contacts he wore were "cumbersome".

Hanzo Hasashi / Scorpion appears in Mortal Kombat Legends: Scorpion's Revenge and Mortal Kombat Legends: Battle of the Realms, voiced by Patrick Seitz. After succeeding in killing Quan Chi and avenging his family in the former film, Scorpion chooses to die on Shang Tsung's island. In the latter film, however, Scorpion finds himself in the Netherrealm, where fallen Elder God Shinnok confronts him for killing Quan Chi and tells him his soul contains the key to freeing Shinnok. Scorpion consults Raiden, who informs him of a powerful magical artifact called the Kamidogu. While looking for it, Scorpion forms an uneasy alliance with Kuai Liang / Sub-Zero before joining Earthrealm's warriors in killing Shinnok.

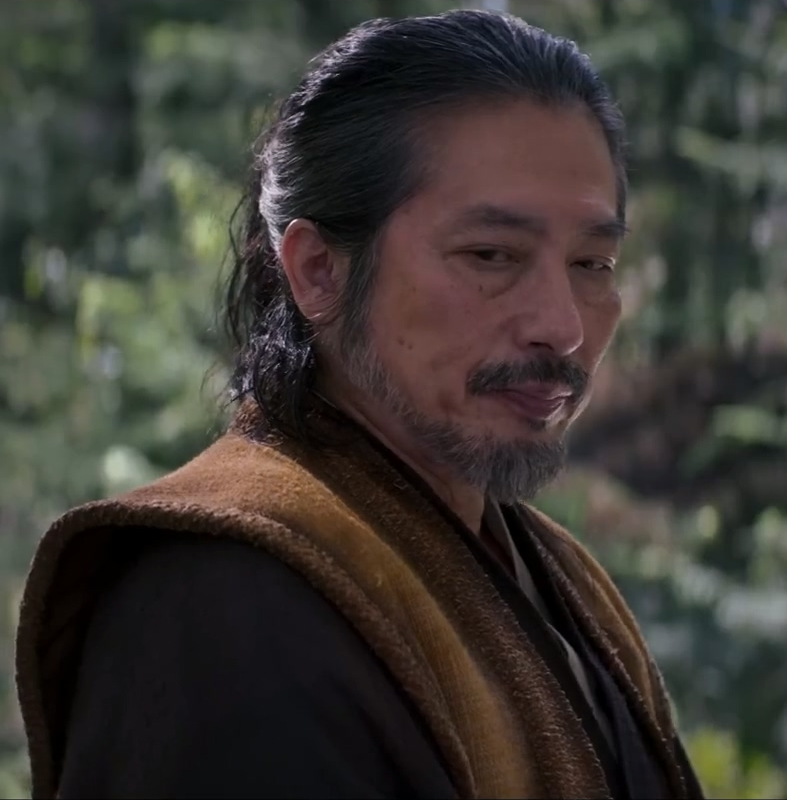
Scorpion, as portrayed by Hiroyuki Sanada in Mortal Kombat II (2026)

Hanzo Hasashi / Scorpion appears in Mortal Kombat (2021), portrayed by Hiroyuki Sanada. Following his clan and most of his family's deaths at Bi-Han's hands, Hasashi tries to avenge them, but is killed as well. Nonetheless, Raiden rescues Hasashi's daughter. Banished to the Netherrealm as a vengeful specter, Hasashi eventually returns in the present to aid his descendant Cole Young in defeating and killing Bi-Han. Sanada returns to the role in the 2026 sequel, Mortal Kombat II, where he assists Johnny Cage and Kano in defeating the resurrected Bi-Han and destroying Shinnok's amulet. While he was initially unfamiliar with the Mortal Kombat franchise, while conducting research on Scorpion, Sanada refers to him as "a very tasty role for an actor: family man changed to fighting machine."

=== Merchandise and promotion ===
Along with the original series characters, Scorpion was highlighted on an individual track from The Immortals' album Mortal Kombat: The Album (1994), titled "Lost Soul Bent on Revenge".

Scorpion has appeared in various types of merchandise during his tenure in the MK series, mostly action figures and sculptures. Hasbro released the first Scorpion figures in 1994: a 3.75" version in which his mask was blue and he was packaged with a plastic scorpion accessory, then a twelve-inch figure whose design and packaged weaponry were more in line with the games. Toy Island distributed a Scorpion figure in 1996 as part of their MK Trilogy collection, which included a pair of hookswords, and Infinite Concepts put out a Scorpion figure in 1999. Jazwares released a 6" Deception figure in 2005, and a 2006 Shaolin Monks figure that was also included as part of a Hot Topic-exclusive two-pack with Sub-Zero, in addition to a collection of figures in 2011: a 4" figure from their MK2011 line, a "Klassic" four-incher, and a "Retro" figure that featured an interchangeable skull head and was packaged with Sub-Zero, Reptile, and Smoke in a box set. Syco Collectibles released a host of Scorpion merchandise in 2011-2012: 10" (with glow-in-the-dark eyes) and 18" polystone statues, along with two busts—a 1:2 scale with a 15" base and light-up eyes; and a smaller bust with an 11" base that featured a detachable head. Pop Culture Shock distributed a life-sized bust in 2011 that featured removable shoulder pads and light-up eyes, as well as a 19" statuette based on his UMK3 design, as part of their "Mortal Kombat Klassics" collection. A 16.5" mixed-media statue was released by the company in 2012, in which Scorpion was sculpted in a spear-throwing pose and was outfitted in all black.

Scorpion was one of thirteen MK2011 characters depicted on life-sized standing cardboard cutouts from Advanced Graphics. Funko released a Scorpion bobblehead in 2011, and he was one of twenty characters featured on 2.5" x 3.5" collectible magnets by Ata-Boy Wholesale that year. He appeared along with other Mortal Kombat series villains, Kabal, Quan Chi, and Shao Kahn, in a collection of 2.5" super-deformed figures released by Jazwares in 2012.

== Reception and legacy ==
=== Cultural impact ===
Scorpion has made several cameo appearances in television programs, such as Drawn Together, Robot Chicken, and The Cleveland Show. The character was featured along with Raiden, Ermac, Jax, and Shang Tsung in a 2014 animated short film produced by Comedy Central that parodied the Mortal Kombat games.

=== Critical reception and popularity ===
Scorpion, along with Sub-Zero, is often regarded as one of the most popular and iconic characters in the Mortal Kombat franchise, and in the fighting-game genre in general. Game Informer rated Scorpion the third-best fighting game character in 2009, while UGO Networks ranked Scorpion second only to the series' main protagonist, Liu Kang, in their 2012 list of the top characters in the franchise. PLAY magazine ranked him fourth on their list of top ninja characters in 2013. Lucas Sullivan of GamesRadar ranked him as the seventh best fighting game character in the genre's history due to the "coolness of his 'undead antagonist' factor. Despite the fact that he started out as a mere palette swap, Scorpion's appeal made him a frontrunner in every major MK game to date." in addition to Complex naming him the fourth-"most dominant" fighting game character.

As Scorpion is regularly intertwined with Sub-Zero throughout the series, they have often been paired together in regards to the critical reception being praised by PC World, GameRevolution, and a GamesRadar article discussed their evolution across the Mortal Kombat series, citing them as its two most popular characters. Together, Scorpion and Sub-Zero were voted the fifth most iconic characters in the two-decade history of the PlayStation by readers of PlayStation Official Magazine – UK in 2015. GamePro ranked ninjas from the series third best palette-swapped video game characters, adding that Midway Games "has turned the art of making new characters from other, different-colored characters into a science." Scorpion's catchphrase, "Get over here!" was listed in PLAY's joke list of ten best chat-up lines. According to PlayStation Universe in 2011, Scorpion "has spawned one of the most iconic catchphrases in gaming history" and "remains a firm fan favorite nineteen years since his debut."

Special moves and fatalities have been mostly well received. IGN regarded Scorpion's "Flaming Skull" as the second-best MK Fatality without specifying any particular title in the series, due to how the player's perception of the character changes when he removes his mask. They called it an "enduring classic", noting that the finisher was notably unchanged in future games as a result of its connection with the character. His spear attack was ranked ninth in was called single most powerful yet balanced attack in the original game, as well as for its initial shock value, furthermore deeming it "the definitive Mortal Kombat move." The "Nether Gate" from MK2011 was included by FHM on their list of the game's nine most brutal Fatalities. His MKII Friendship, shared with Sub-Zero and Reptile, placed in Prima Games' list of the series' top 50 fatalities, in addition to the "Nether Gate", his stage fatality from MK2011, and the "Flaming Skull" from the original MK. Paste rated it the fourth-best Fatality from MK2011, in addition to rating the "Flaming Skull" as the third-best finisher from the first game. However, his Animality from UMK3/Trilogy (a penguin that lays an exploding egg) tied with that of Rain as the eighth worst finisher in the series according to GamePro.

The Escapist called the Scorpion and Sub-Zero-themed episode 7 "one of the best episodes" in the series, lending an emotional weight to the most famous tale in the franchise. On the other hand, Film School Rejects bemoaned the series' expectation that its viewers be knowledgeable about the franchise's history, explaining that without previous knowledge of the games, the viewer is left with too many questions that may never be answered. Critical reception of Scorpion's role in his spin-off was the subject of mixed commentary, as Alessandro Fillari of GameSpot as it excelled when it focused on Scorpion, but felt the character-heavy storyline "makes for an overstuffed plot". Sam Stone of Comic Book Resources praised its development of the protagonist's backstory, However, Bob Chipman of The Escapist opined that Scorpion's was the film's only grace, as he overshadows the rest of the cast of the film. Joshua Yehl of IGN commented, "The movie’s biggest problem is that it tries to do the epic Mortal Kombat tournament arc on top of a more personal Scorpion story and ends up doing justice to neither." Meanwhile, Scorpion's backstory from the 2021 live-action film was praised how violent it was without ruining the film. IGN in particular liked the handling of Scorpion and Sub-Zero's rivalry across the movie's fight scenes, Grim Dark Magazine agreed while also liking how the film properly cast Sanada and his rival for the roles, making them faithful to the original material.

== See also ==
- Ninja in popular culture
