= Sub-Zero (Mortal Kombat) =

Mortal Kombat character

- Mortal Kombat character
- Sub-Zero artwork by John Tobias for Mortal Kombat Mythologies: Sub-Zero (1997)
- First appearance: Mortal Kombat (1992)
- Last appearance: Mortal Kombat: Onslaught (2023)
- Created by: Ed Boon; John Tobias
- Designed by: John Tobias (MK, MKII, MK3, MKM:SZ, MK4); Allan Ditzig (MK:DA); Luis Mangubat (MK:D)
- Voiced by: Various: Bi-Han: Jim Cummings (Mortal Kombat: The Journey Begins); John Turk (MKM:SZ); Jamieson Price (MK9); Steve Blum (Mortal Kombat Legends: Scorpion's Revenge); Kaiji Tang (MK1); Kuai Liang: Luke Perry (Mortal Kombat: Defenders of the Realm); John Tobias (MK4); Ed Boon (MK:D); Rom Barkhordar (MK:SM, MK:A); Jim Miller (MKvs.DCU, MK9); Steve Blum (MKX, MK11, MK:O); Dimitri Vegas (MK11, skin); Bayardo De Murguia (Mortal Kombat Legends: Battle of the Realms); Ron Yuan (Mortal Kombat Legends: Snow Blind)
- Portrayed by: Various: François Petit (Mortal Kombat 1995 film); Ryan Watson, Darius Wahrhaftig and Drew MacIver (Mortal Kombat: Live Tour); Keith Cooke (Mortal Kombat Annihilation); J. J. Perry (Mortal Kombat: Conquest, Mortal Kombat: Federation of Martial Arts); Kevan Ohtsji (Mortal Kombat: Legacy); Eric Steinberg (Mortal Kombat: Legacy II); Harry Shum, Jr. (Mortal Kombat: Legacy II); Joe Taslim (Mortal Kombat 2021 film)
- Motion capture: Various: Daniel Pesina (MK, MKII); Joshua Y. Tsui (MKII, unmasked); John Turk (MK3, MKM:SZ, MK4); Tony Chung (MK11); Noah Fleder and Carlos Pesina (MK1)

In-universe information
- Full name: Bi-Han (MK, MKM:SZ, MK1); Kuai Liang (MKII, MK3, MK4, MK:DA, MK:D, MK:SM, MK:A, MKvs.DCU, MK9, MKX, MK11, MK:O)
- Species: Human/cryomancer
- Weapon: Ice scepter (MK4); Ice sword (MK:DA, MK:D, MK:A, MKvs.DCU, MK9, MKX); Ice daggers (MKX); Ice hammer (MKX, MK1); Ice pollaxe (MK11); Ice combistick (MK1)
- Origin: China
- Nationality: Chinese

Sub-Zero is the name of two fictional characters in the Mortal Kombat fighting game franchise by Midway Games and NetherRealm Studios. Warriors from the fictional Lin Kuei clan, the two possess the ability to control ice in many forms. Characters by the name are the only fighters to appear in every main installment of the series, along with the action-adventure spin-off Mortal Kombat Mythologies: Sub-Zero (1997).

In the games, the mantle of Sub-Zero is used by brothers Bi-Han (Chinese: 避寒; pinyin: Bì Hán) and Kuai Liang (Chinese: 奎凉; pinyin: Kúi Liáng). Bi-Han debuted as Sub-Zero in the original Mortal Kombat game before appearing in subsequent installments as Noob Saibot. Kuai Liang took over the mantle in Mortal Kombat II (1993) and served as the franchise's main Sub-Zero up to Mortal Kombat: Onslaught (2023). In Mortal Kombat 1 (2023), Bi-Han returns as Sub-Zero, while Kuai Liang becomes Scorpion.

One of the Mortal Kombat franchise's signature characters, Sub-Zero has appeared in various related media outside of the games. He has received critical acclaim for his appearance, abilities, and Fatality finishing moves.

== Character creation ==
John Tobias' original concept art and idea notes for the "Lin Kuei / Ninja" character that would become Sub-Zero.

Sub-Zero was first conceived by Mortal Kombat co-creator John Tobias as a mysterious character named simply "Ninja" and inspired by the book China's Ninja Connection by Li Hsing, which "posits historical evidence for the existence of the Lin Kuei and their influence on the Japanese ninja. I was aware of there being some controversy about the author’s claims. So when we split the character in two for palette swaps, I thought it would be fitting that one was of Chinese origin and the other Japanese to kind of embody the argument." According to Tobias, the original "Hunter&Hunted concept was going [to be] about a ninja escaping from his clan and hunted by another member. We used that later for SZ in MK3." Sub-Zero's early name was Tundra.

In his early appearances, Sub-Zero was primarily portrayed and voiced by non-Asian actors. Midway Games later explained Sub-Zero's rather occidental appearance for a Chinese assassin by giving him a white mother. According to this new backstory, his father had a wife, two sons, and a daughter while he lived in America to hide his personal role as an assassin for the Lin Kuei. Midway Games programmer Josh Tsui portrayed the unmasked Sub-Zero (Kuai Liang) in the character's Mortal Kombat II ending.

=== Designs ===
Sub-Zero's early costumes have been very simple due to technical limitations. Mortal Kombat co-creator Ed Boon noted that Kuai Liang's counterpart from DC Comics is Batman as both are "dark, mysterious, brooding characters". Since Mortal Kombat 3, Sub-Zero has had a scar running down from his forehead and across his right eye as a mark of death. The scar was originally red, and later changed to blue in Mortal Kombat: Deadly Alliance as a result of Sub-Zero's enhanced powers. Tobias said that Sub-Zero was unmasked in Mortal Kombat 3 in order to stir up fan speculation about the character's backstory. The new Sub-Zero made his official debut on the cover of GamePro April 1995 issue, with Turk's red outfit tinted blue (as it was for the game), but the photo used was a reversed negative, as his scar was over his left eye.

Mortal Kombat and Deadly Alliance states that Sub-Zero is 6 feet 2 inches tall; in recent games such as Mortal Kombat X and Mortal Kombat 11, his sprite appears to be similar to most characters. In Mortal Kombat: Deception, his scar has faded to the point where it can no longer be seen. He now wore an armored uniform heavily inspired by Dynastic era Chinese battle armor, though it was often criticized by fans as being too reminiscent of Teenage Mutant Ninja Turtles villain, the Shredder. However, Sub-Zero's alternate uniform was very reminiscent of Chinese culture, even featuring Sub-Zero without a cowl and a Qing dynasty-era hairstyle. In Mortal Kombat: Armageddon, Sub-Zero reverts to his masked costume from Deadly Alliance, retaining the scar, which is not part of his alternate costume (which is the primary one from Deception). Since Deadly Alliance, Sub-Zero is the only character who has shown considerable signs of aging. Concept art from Deadly Alliance depicted him with a graying, receding hairline, and a more pale and gaunt face, while his scar was now blue and his forearms frozen over. Although Sub-Zero originally had blue eyes, they turned white after he obtained the Dragon Medallion in the game. Sub-Zero's appearance in Mortal Kombat: Shaolin Monks was one of the most revised ones from the title. Character lead Mark Lappin did almost ten passes on his design; producer Shaun Himmerick noted that "we went through literally 5-6 heads and styles of head costume on him" and commented that Sub-Zero's design in Mortal Kombat was difficult to make although most people called it "simple". In the end, the staff was satisfied with his final look in the game as it reminisces them to his classic outfit. His appearance in Injustice 2 was redesigned by Jim Lee.

=== Gameplay ===
When he first appeared in the first Mortal Kombat, Sub-Zero featured only two special moves: his ice blast and sliding kick. These moves have become Sub-Zero's trademark since then, being featured in every game that Sub-Zero has appeared in (Mortal Kombat II and subsequent games feature a younger Sub-Zero whose identity is Kuai Liang). Mortal Kombat II added his ground freeze move, and two new Fatalities including the now-famous one where he would freeze and shatter the victim. According to Boon, Sub-Zero's Freeze was originally omitted from the game in place of the Ice Shower, but was brought back in the next revision following fan feedback at a local arcade. Sub-Zero's Predator-inspired Fatality, the "Spine Rip," is considered by Boon to be his favorite Fatality from the first game as well as the most controversial.

Some home versions of the first game replaced the "Spine Rip" with another finishing move due to its violent content, for instance the SNES port had a freeze and shatter finishing move due to Nintendo's "family friendly" policies (this tame fatality received a positive reception so it was added to Sub-Zero's arsenal in the sequels). Unlike other returning characters whose moves remained intact, the spine rip Fatality was not carried over to Mortal Kombat II and Mortal Kombat 3, (an explanation is because Kuai Liang was heroic compared to his villainous brother Bi-Han). The Nintendo 64 port of Mortal Kombat Trilogy gives Sub-Zero's special techniques and finishing moves to the classic masked version, due to the fact the N64's cartridge format had memory restrictions that did not allow the use of both masked and unmasked characters. The developers had to remove the "Spine Rip" from Mortal Kombat vs. DC Universe as that game was aimed at a younger audience. Sub-Zero also gained a teleporting move in the game in which he freezes himself and falls back to the ground, appearing behind the foe.

== Appearances ==
=== Main Mortal Kombat games ===
Bi-Han / Sub-Zero first appears as a playable character in Mortal Kombat (1992). A cryomancer and warrior of the Chinese Lin Kuei clan, he is sent to kill Shang Tsung, host of the eponymous Mortal Kombat tournament. (Note: Future games retcon this into the Lin Kuei being hired by Shang Tsung to fight in the tournament on Outworld's behalf) However, Bi-Han is revealed to have been killed by the specter Scorpion following the events of the game. From there, Kuai Liang takes the mantle of Sub-Zero in Mortal Kombat II (1993) and tries to complete Bi-Han's mission; this time Tsung is guarded by Reptile. Kuai Liang would prove himself to be markedly more compassive and even heroic than his brother, which would lead Scorpion to keep him under a watchful eye rather than blindly continue his vendetta. In Mortal Kombat 3 (1995), Kuai Liang leaves the Lin Kuei after the clan begins converting their warriors into cyborgs and is recruited by Earthrealm's protector Raiden to defeat the tyrant Shao Kahn. Additionally, an alternate playable character called "Classic Sub-Zero" appears in Ultimate Mortal Kombat 3 (1995) and Mortal Kombat Trilogy (1996). Initially believed to be Bi-Han, he is an unidentified warrior who emerges to assassinate Shang Tsung.

In Mortal Kombat 4 (1997), Raiden summons Kuai Liang to help him defend Earthrealm against the fallen Elder God Shinnok, during which he re-encounters Scorpion after the latter freed himself from the sorcerer Quan Chi's control. In Mortal Kombat: Deadly Alliance (2002), Kuai Liang becomes the new leader of the Lin Kuei and takes on an apprentice named Frost, who tries to betray him. In Mortal Kombat: Deception (2004), Kuai Liang joins forces with the warrior Shujinko, among others, to combat the Dragon King Onaga and finds Bi-Han, who had been converted into the undead wraith Noob Saibot. In Mortal Kombat: Armageddon (2006), Sub-Zero faces the warrior Taven, who aids him in defeating Noob Saibot so the former can heal him. Kuai Liang appears as a playable character in Mortal Kombat vs. DC Universe (2008).

Both Bi-Han and Kuai Liang appear in Mortal Kombat (2011). Despite Raiden's alterations to the timeline, Bi-Han is still killed by Scorpion through Quan Chi's manipulation and converted into Noob Saibot, leading to Kuai Liang / Tundra becoming Sub-Zero. While attempting to avenge Bi-Han, Kuai Liang is converted into a cyborg, but joins Raiden's side upon regaining his mind. Kuai Liang is later killed by Shao Kahn's queen Sindel and kept by Quan Chi as an undead revenant. In Mortal Kombat X (2015), Kuai Lang is restored to life by Raiden and becomes the Lin Kuei's new grandmaster. In Mortal Kombat 11 (2019), Kuai Liang assists Earthrealm's warriors in fighting the keeper of time Kronika.

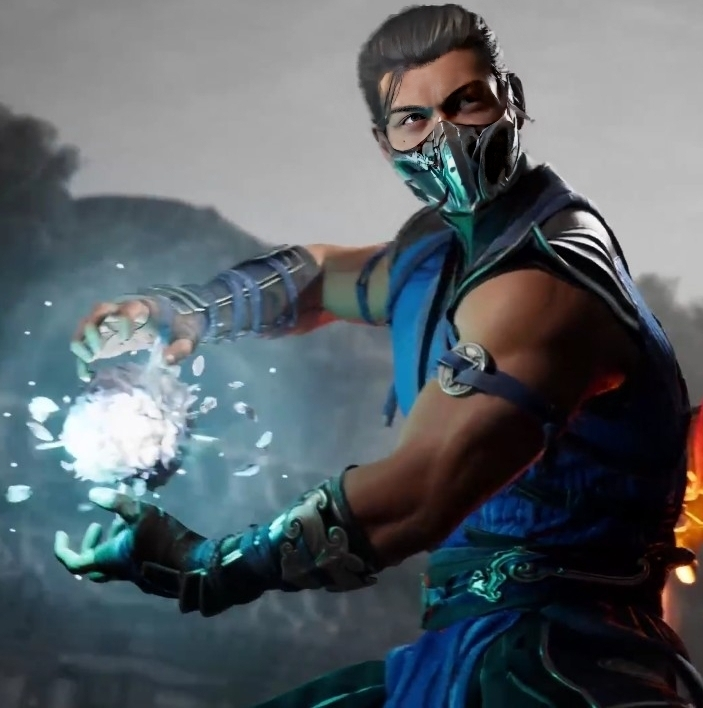
Sub-Zero in Mortal Kombat 1

In Mortal Kombat 1 (2023), Fire God Liu Kang creates a new timeline, where Bi-Han becomes Sub-Zero once more while Kuai Liang became Scorpion. Both appear as playable characters while an unidentified Sub-Zero appears as an assist character, or "Kameo Fighter". Liu Kang sends Bi-Han, Kuai Liang, and their adopted brother Smoke to investigate Shang Tsung. However, Shang Tsung sways Bi-Han to his side. Kuai Liang and Smoke escape to help Liu Kang stop Shang Tsung before heading to Japan to found the Shirai Ryu clan and replace the Lin Kuei as Earthrealm's protectors. In the Khaos Reigns DLC, Bi-Han leads the Lin Kuei in an attack on the Shirai Ryu to test Sektor's powered suits, only to be captured by Titan Havik and converted into Noob Saibot. After being rescued, Bi-Han reluctantly joins forces with Liu Kang to stop him.

==== Spin-offs Mortal Kombat games ====
In Mortal Kombat Mythologies: Sub-Zero, Bi-Han embarks on a quest to aid Quan Chi in exchange for his help in destroying the Shirai Ryu, but later steals Shinnok's amulet under Raiden's guidance before participating in the first Mortal Kombat tournament.

In an alternate take on Mortal Kombat II's events depicted in Mortal Kombat: Shaolin Monks (2005), in which Kuai Liang appears as a boss and unlockable player character, he briefly allies himself with Liu Kang and Kung Lao while searching for Bi-Han, who had been transformed into the undead Noob Saibot.

Kuai Liang appears as a playable character in Mortal Kombat: Onslaught (2023).

==== Other guest appearances ====
Furthermore, he appears as a guest character in NBA Jam Tournament Edition (1995, although he was removed from later versions of the game), The Grid (2000), and MLB Slugfest: Loaded (2004) as well as a downloadable playable character in Injustice 2 (2017). An unlockable outfit based on Sub-Zero was added to Fortnite Battle Royale (2017).

An unidentified Sub-Zero makes a cameo appearance in Injustice: Gods Among Us (2013) while a character inspired by Sub-Zero called Sub-273 appears as the final boss of Punch Club (2016).

=== Other media ===
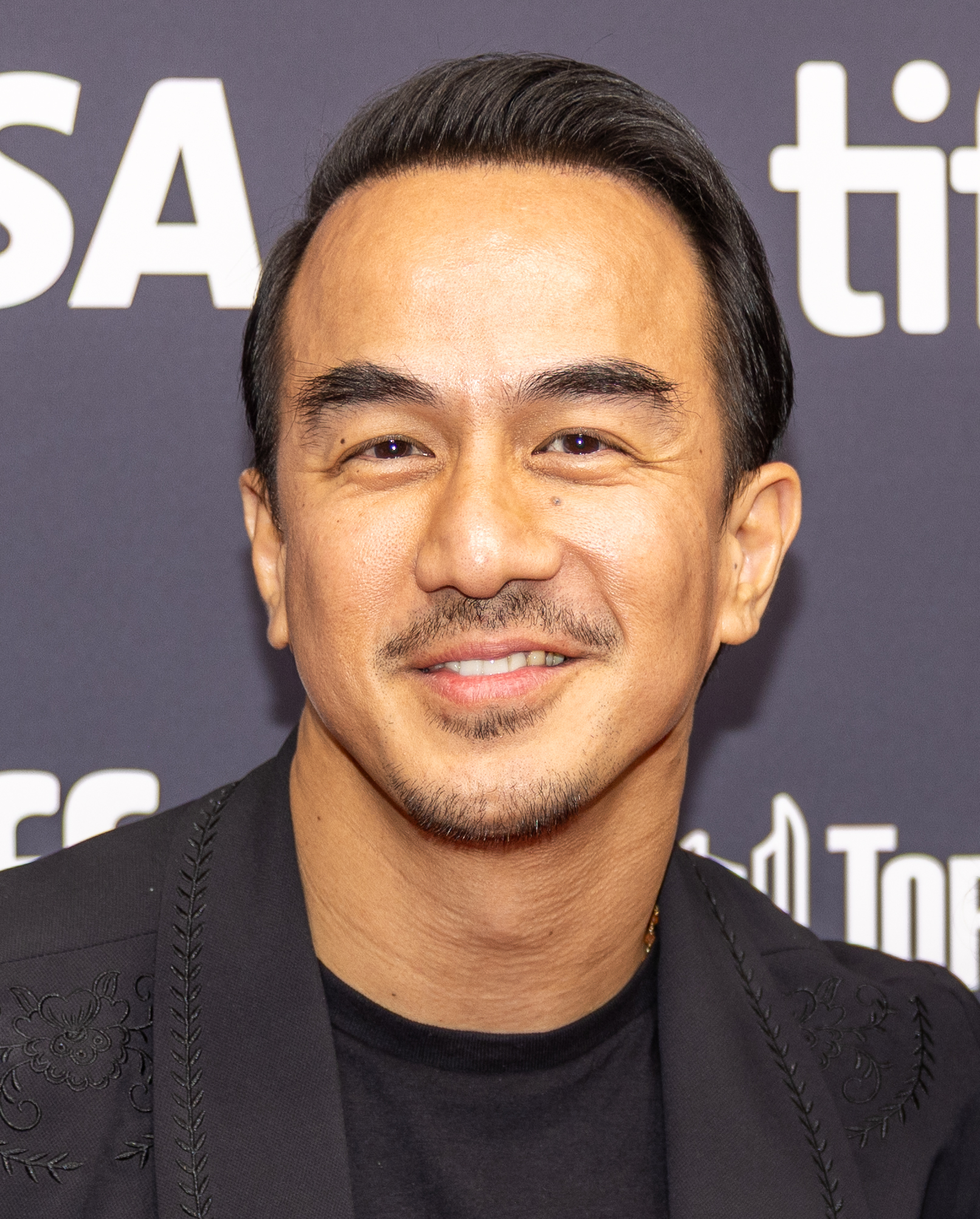
Joe Taslim portrayed Sub-Zero in the 2021 film Mortal Kombat.

The Bi-Han and Kuai Liang incarnations of Sub-Zero appear in Malibu Comics' Mortal Kombat: Blood & Thunder and Mortal Kombat: Battlewave miniseries respectively. Additionally, Kuai Liang / Sub-Zero appears in DC Comics' Mortal Kombat X: Blood Ties.

The Bi-Han incarnation of Sub-Zero appears in Mortal Kombat (1995), portrayed by François Petit. This version is an enslaved servant of Shang Tsung who is later killed by Liu Kang. Additionally, Bi-Han appears in Mortal Kombat: The Journey Begins, voiced by an uncredited Jim Cummings.

The Kuai Liang incarnation of Sub-Zero appears in Mortal Kombat: Live Tour, portrayed by Ryan Watson; Mortal Kombat: Defenders of the Realm, voiced by Luke Perry; and Mortal Kombat Annihilation, portrayed by Keith Cooke.

An original past incarnation of Sub-Zero appears in Mortal Kombat: Conquest, portrayed by J. J. Perry. He is an unnamed ancestor of Bi-Han and Kuai Liang's and a Lin Kuei assassin working for Shang Tsung from the Great Kung Lao's time period who displays a rivalry with his time's Scorpion, whose lover Peron killed Sub-Zero's sister, leading to Sub-Zero killing Peron in turn.

The Bi-Han incarnation of Sub-Zero and Kuai Liang appear in Mortal Kombat: Legacy, with the former portrayed by Kevan Ohtsji in the first season and Eric Steinberg in the second while Liang is portrayed by Harry Shum. This version of Bi-Han was a childhood friend of Hanzo Hasashi before they drifted apart due to their mutual hatred for each other's clans. Twenty years later, they formed an uneasy truce. Though Kuai Liang provoked Hasashi into fighting him and was subsequently killed by him, Hasashi and Bi-Han attempted to maintain peace until Quan Chi impersonates Bi-Han and kills Hasashi's clan, family, and Hasashi himself. By the present, Hasashi became Scorpion and resurfaces to kill Bi-Han.

The Bi-Han incarnation of Sub-Zero appears in Mortal Kombat Legends: Scorpion's Revenge (2020), voiced by Steve Blum.

The Bi-Han incarnation of Sub-Zero appears in Mortal Kombat (2021), portrayed by Joe Taslim. This version is the leader of the Lin Kuei and ally of Shang Tsung who personally led the attack that killed most of Hanzo Hasashi's family before killing Hasashi himself. In the present, Bi-Han helps Shang Tsung ensure Outworld's victory in the Mortal Kombat tournament. However, he is defeated and killed by Hasashi and the latter's descendant Cole Young before Shang Tsung claims Bi-Han's body. Taslim was surprised by how violent was his character and his death, which convinced him to take the role. Additionally, he has stated that he found Sub-Zero "cool and he's just kickass" and wanted to humanize him, wanting audiences to feel his pain and that he still has dilemmas. He felt the character became scary and lacked any sort of humanity in the final project.

The Kuai Liang incarnation of Sub-Zero appears in Mortal Kombat Legends: Battle of the Realms and Mortal Kombat Legends: Snow Blind, voiced by Bayardo De Murguia in the former and Ron Yuan in the latter.

==== Other guest appearances ====
Bi-Han / Sub-Zero is set to appear as a crossover character in DC K.O. Boss Battle #1, published again by DC Comics and tying into the DC K.O. story event. Sub-Zero will appear alongside characters such as Homelander from Dynamite's The Boys and Red Sonja.

== Reception ==
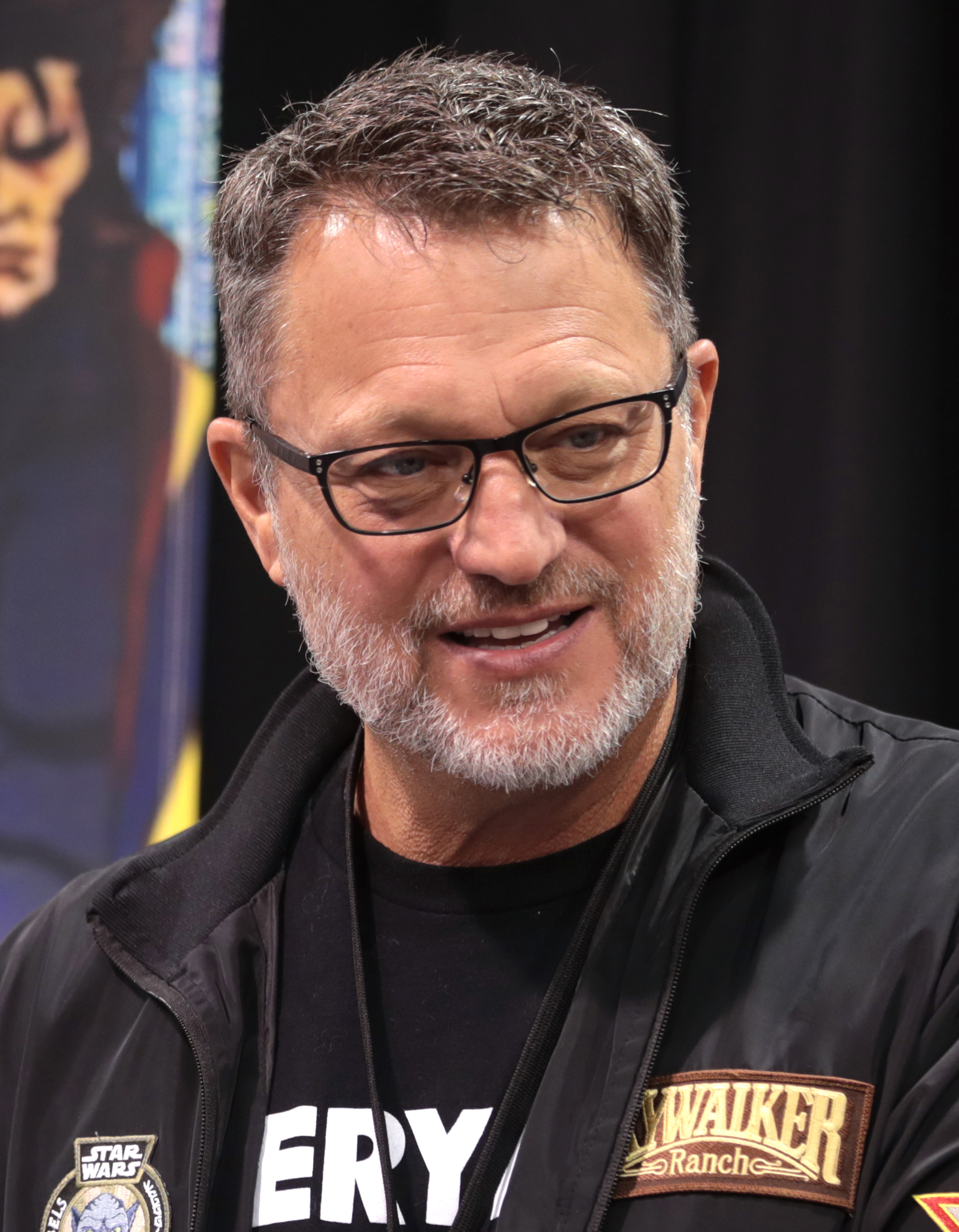
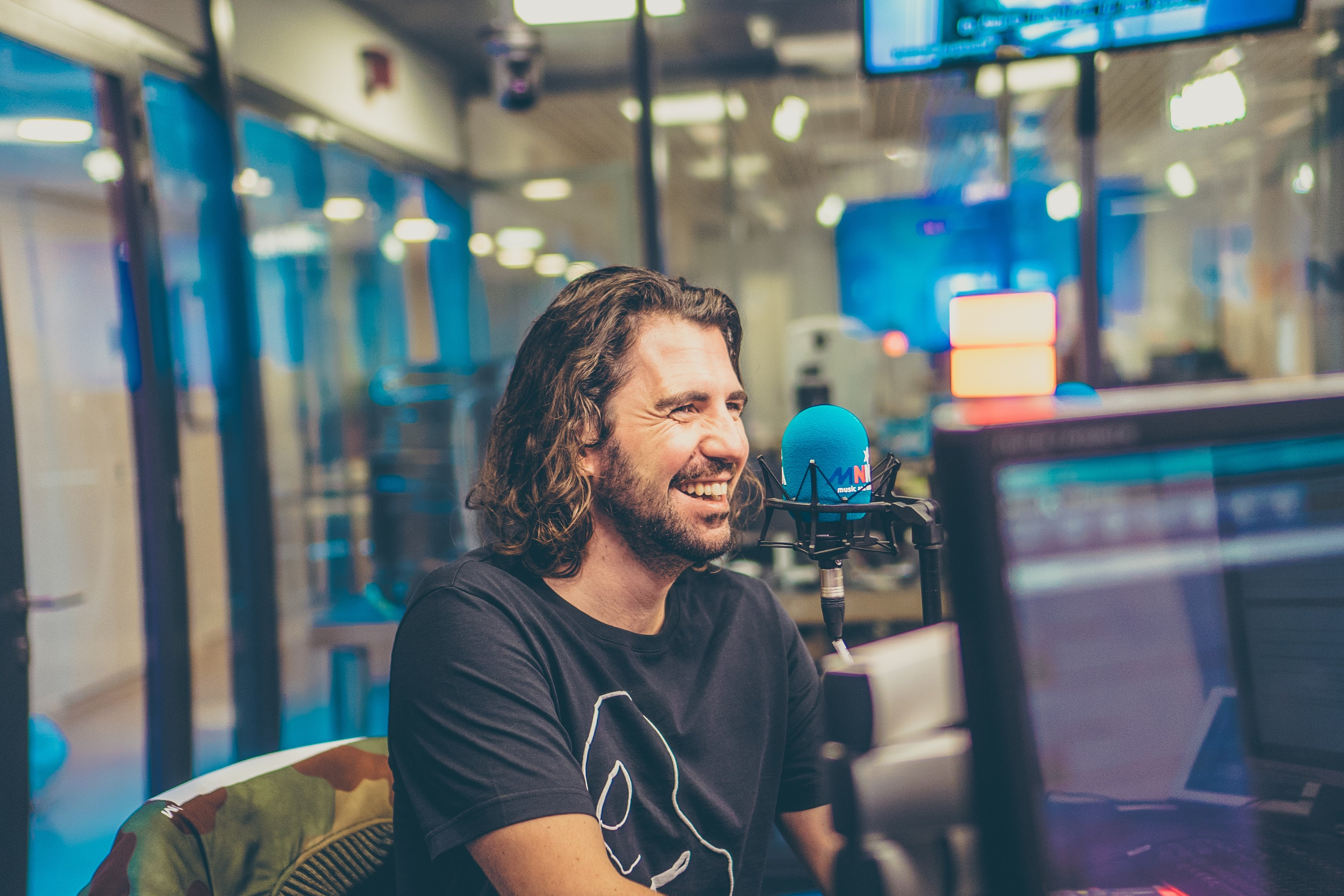
While Steve Blum's performance as Sub-Zero's English actor was praised, Dimitri Vegas' in Mortal Kombat 11 was criticized.

Merchandise items of the character include action figures, statues, and a joystick released along with Mortal Kombat: Deception for the PlayStation 2.

Deemed one of the most popular and recognizable characters in the Mortal Kombat franchise, as well as in the fighting-genre as a whole, Sub-Zero is regarded as the franchise's most iconic character along with Scorpion. He was given the award of the best fighter of 1997 by SuperGamePower (readers vote). A GamesRadar article from 2011 discussed his and Scorpion's evolution across the Mortal Kombat series, citing them as its two most popular characters. IGN's Brian Altano and Ryan Clements chose him as the most iconic character of Mortal Kombat to represent the series against Jin Kazama of Tekken and Ryu of Street Fighter. Together, Scorpion and Sub-Zero were voted the fifth most iconic characters in the two decades of the PlayStation by readers of PlayStation Official Magazine – UK in 2015. TheGamer.com said both Sub-Zero and Scorpion were manipulated by Quan Chi to be enemies and Mortal Kombat X ends the feud when both fighters join forces to kill the sorcerer. However, criticized Sub-Zero's characterization from Mortal Kombat 1 as he comes across as an obvious villain when interacting with the rest of the cast.

Several writers focused on his designs. UGO noted his ninja costume as the most iconic from the series. GamePlayBook praised his freeze attacks and "Head Rip" Fatality, His redesign in Mortal Kombat 3 was disliked by GamePro, which they deemed "suspenders" and compared his scar to a red smear. However, his appearance in Deadly Alliance received praise by Gaming Age's Tim Lewinson noting that "Sub-Zero never looked so good." According to GameSpot's Jeff Gerstmann, the unlocking of the hidden character Classic Sub-Zero in Ultimate Mortal Kombat 3 was "annoying" to the point that players would not do it. BBC News mentioned Sub-Zero as a prominent example of "Western ninja-inspired nonsense" in popular culture.

His ice-projectile technique has been noted by 1UP.com to be one of the best mechanics that changed video games due to how practical it is as it gives players the opportunity of making any move while the opponent is frozen. Prima Games listed the same move as the 23rd in fighting games due to how it paralyses enemies, allowing the player to attack the enemy.

Hyper's John Dewhurst opined that what contributed to the failure of Mythologies Sub-Zero is that Sub-Zero's character alone "isn't that interesting without Johnny Cage and Kitana to bounce off." GameDaily listed his appearance in Mortal Kombat Mythologies: Sub-Zero as one of his worst moments. On the other hand, IGN staff liked how Sub-Zero was given his own video game, noting him to be one of the series' most popular characters, and that "it offers gamers a new look at Sub Zero." Den of Geek praised his role in Mythologies Sub-Zero whereas the second Sub-Zero was noted for many of his actions such as his rivalry with Batman, as well as his role in the series such as his relationship with the Lin Kuei. The rivalry between Sub-Zero and Batman in Mortal Kombat vs. DC Universe was emphasized by IGN who noted that although both characters were extremely powerful, Sub-Zero's freezing skills were more entertaining than Batman's abilities.

When it comes to voice acting, critics also found Steve Blum as one of the best actors in the franchise for his take on Sub-Zero and wished he would return in future installments. On the other hand, Dimitri Vegas' performance as Sub-Zero in Mortal Kombat 11 was the subject of heavy criticism, with Eurogamer describing it as "truly awful". Bleeding Cool noted fan response was negative too, to the point it was as bad as Ronda Rousey's performance as Sonya Blade in the same game. Instead, they preferred Blum.

When it comes portrayals outside gaming, The Escapist called the Scorpion and Sub-Zero-themed episode 7 "one of the best episodes" in the Legacy series, lending an emotional weight to the most famous tale in the franchise. On the other hand, Film School Rejects bemoaned the series' expectation that its viewers be knowledgeable about the franchise's history, explaining that without previous knowledge of the games, the viewer is left with too many questions that may never be answered. Stephen Wilds of ComingSoon.net said that while it is a cliche that Sub-Zero is rude mentor to Kenshi, the fact that he is tired of fighting might divide the audience. Ron Yuan's voice acting as Sub-Zero was praised by Comic Book Resources. Taslim's portrayal of the character was praised by Los Angeles Times for his violent moves performed on several characters from the 2021 movie referring to him as "a Takashi Miike remake of Frozen". Espinof agreed with both Sub-Zero's handling and Scorpion so much they would like to have them explored more in a prequel. Discussing Film enjoyed how entertaining is Sub-Zero as a villain due to the action scenes he is involved. However, GamesRadar+ was more critical to the character, claiming he lacked a personality in the film other than being one of Shang Tsung's pawns.

== See also ==
- Ninjas in popular culture
