= The Grid (video game) =

2000 video game

- Developer: Midway Games
- Publisher: Midway Games
- Platform: Arcade
- Release: 2000
- Genre: Third-person shooter
- Mode: Up to 6 players (1 per cabinet)
- Arcade system: Midway Zeus 2 hardware Main CPU: TMS32031 (@ 50 MHz); Sound CPU: ADSP2104 (@ 16 MHz); Sound Chips: (2x) DMA-driven (@ 16 MHz)

The Grid is a 2000 arcade game by Midway. It is a third-person shooter which consists of a super-violent television game show hosted by a Smash TV-like host. The game centres around deathmatches. Players control their character using a joystick with a trigger for shooting, a top button for jumping and trackball for aiming. The object of each match is to accumulate the most points by eliminating other opponents. Local multiplayer with up to six players is possible by linking up multiple cabinets. Computer-controlled bots can also be used in place of human opponents. Players can collect cash that is used to upgrade player attributes. Individual player progress and statistics can be saved and retrieved through unique account numbers that are entered on a keypad.

The game was created by the developers behind the Mortal Kombat series of games and has cameos from characters Sub-Zero, Scorpion, and Noob Saibot. This was Midway's last arcade game.
