= Mortal Kombat (2011 video game) =

2011 fighting video game

- North American cover art featuring Scorpion and Sub-Zero
- Developer: NetherRealm Studios (Note: Microsoft Windows version ported by High Voltage Software)
- Publisher: Warner Bros. Interactive Entertainment
- Director: Ed Boon
- Producers: Hans P. Lo; Adam Urbano; Hector Sanchez
- Designers: Paulo Garcia; John Edwards
- Artists: Steve Beran; Pav Kovacic
- Writers: John Vogel; Brian Chard; Dominic Cianciolo
- Composers: Dean Grinsfelder; Todd Haberman; Cris Velasco; Sascha Dikiciyan
- Series: Mortal Kombat
- Engine: Unreal Engine 3
- Platforms: PlayStation 3; Xbox 360; PlayStation Vita; Windows
- Release: April 19, 2011: PlayStation 3, Xbox 360; NA: April 19, 2011; EU: April 21, 2011; AU: May 1, 2013 PlayStation Vita; NA: May 1, 2012; EU: May 4, 2012 Windows Steam; WW: July 3, 2013 Retail; NA: August 6, 2013; EU: October 18, 2013
- Genre: Fighting
- Modes: Single-player, multiplayer

Mortal Kombat (also known as Mortal Kombat 9 (MK9)) is a 2011 fighting game developed by NetherRealm Studios and published by Warner Bros. Interactive Entertainment. It is the ninth main installment in the Mortal Kombat franchise and a soft reboot of the series. The game was released for the PlayStation 3 and Xbox 360 systems in April 2011, and a PlayStation Vita port was released in May 2012. An expanded version of the game, titled Mortal Kombat: Komplete Edition, was released for Xbox 360 and PlayStation 3 in February 2012 and for Microsoft Windows in July 2013.

Although beginning during the events of Mortal Kombat: Armageddon, the plot is a retroactive continuity to the earliest period in the Mortal Kombat series: the events of the first three games (Mortal Kombat, Mortal Kombat II and Mortal Kombat 3, as well as the third game's two updates Ultimate Mortal Kombat 3 and Mortal Kombat Trilogy). The storyline involves the divine protector of Earth, Raiden, attempting to change the aftermath of the events of Armageddon by contacting his past self as he faces defeat at the hands of the evil emperor of Outworld, Shao Kahn. While having characters and levels rendered in three-dimensions, the gameplay distances itself from the 3D graphics style seen in the last five games, bearing closer resemblance to that of the 2D era of the series, using a camera that is perpendicular to the two-dimensional playing field. Colloquially, this is called 2.5D.

Upon release, Mortal Kombat received very positive reviews and won several awards for fighting game of the year. It was also a commercial success, selling one million copies in the first month alone. Due to its extremely violent content, the game was banned in Australia due to the lack of an appropriate ratings category, as well as in South Korea; it has also reportedly been indexed in Germany. The Australian ban was later lifted due to the introduction of an R18 classification, and the game was released along with many other R-rated games in May 2013. A sequel, Mortal Kombat X was released in 2015.

== Gameplay ==
A montage of two screenshots from the game, showing a fight between Johnny Cage and Mileena (not displaying the HUD) and the new "X-ray move" feature (showing the same characters and the HUD)

Principal gameplay involves one-on-one 2.5D-style fighting. Mortal Kombat uses a single two-dimensional fighting plane (at 60 frames per second), although characters are rendered in three-dimensional fashion, intended to give depth and range to portrayals of various projectiles. Unlike previous Mortal Kombat games, four buttons on the game controller represent attacks and are each linked to a corresponding limb.

A new feature is the "super meter", which can be charged by various actions during battle such as performing special moves, getting blocked by the opponent, or getting hit by them. The super meter can be charged to three levels, each of them enabling a different action to be performed. At the first level, it can be used to deliver an enhanced version of one of the character's special attacks; two levels can be used to interrupt a combo attack, and the full three levels allow for the delivery of a special attack called an "X-ray move". The X-ray move unleashes a series of attacks during which the game provides an internal view of the character being attacked, which shows their bones and organs being broken or ruptured.

Extra features include a story mode during which the player plays as multiple characters, a Fatality training mode (allowing players to practice executing finishing moves), the Challenge Tower, tag team fighting, and an online mode. The Challenge Tower mode is a single-player option that includes 300 specific challenges of various difficulties providing currency rewards upon completion; players have the option of using in-game currency to bypass other difficult challenges, completing them later. Among the various challenges are "Test Your Might" (rapidly pressing buttons and using specific timing to destroy blocks of varying difficulty), "Test Your Sight" (following an object hidden under a cup or skull and revealing the object after a shuffle), "Test Your Strike" (destroying a specific block in a stack) and "Test Your Luck" (fighting under certain conditions, such as no jumping). The four-player tag-team feature is an original feature, allowing two players to play together. During tag gameplay, two new types of attacks become available. The first of them is the "tag assist" attack, in which the off-screen character temporarily jumps in and performs certain attacks during the active character's combo. The other is the "tag kombo", in which the active character performs a combo that is finished by the off-screen character as they enter the fight.

The online mode includes a "King of the Hill" option, where up to eight players can act as spectators and play the winner of a fight. Spectators may also rate the fights and use the "forum" to determine how to perform various combos or moves observed during a fight. A single-use online pass is also included with the game which is mandatory to access the online components. Online passes are also available from the PlayStation Store and Xbox Live Marketplace. There is also a PlayStation 3-exclusive 3D display mode, for which 3D glasses are not necessary.

== Story ==
=== Setting ===
The game's director, Ed Boon, described it as an altered re-telling of the events of the first three Mortal Kombat games (Mortal Kombat, Mortal Kombat II and Mortal Kombat 3):

"Raiden is about to be killed by Shao Kahn, and just before he delivers the last blow, Raiden sends a mental message to his earlier self by saying that he must win, and the camera rewinds back to Mortal Kombat 1. The Raiden from Mortal Kombat 1 then gets the message and experiences a premonition. The game then spans Mortal Kombat 1, 2, and 3, retelling the story with an enlightened Raiden, who has changed the course of events. Eventually, everything the player has seen happen before — Liu Kang winning, Lin Kuei turning into cybernetic ninjas, has been altered. You might see a cybernetic character who wasn't before, and a different version of events."

This game also retcons the ending of Mortal Kombat: Armageddon, where Taven defeats Blaze, to have Shao Kahn the one who defeats him instead.

=== Plot ===
During the Armageddon war, all warriors from the realms have been killed, leaving only Raiden and Shao Kahn. Having defeated Blaze, Shao Kahn is imbued with godlike power and easily overpowers Raiden. In a final attempt to stop Shao Kahn, Raiden casts one last spell to send a message to his past self through his shattered amulet, with the vague message "He must win" before Shao Kahn delivers a killing blow on him.

Back to the events of the first tournament, the past Raiden sees visions of the future due to the message he received and notices his amulet has been damaged. Raiden concludes that Liu Kang must win the tournament to save Earthrealm. During the tournament, Raiden pleads with Scorpion to spare Bi-Han, better known as the first Sub-Zero, in exchange for asking the Elder Gods to resurrect Scorpion's clan, which had been supposedly assaulted by Sub-Zero. Scorpion reluctantly agrees, but Quan Chi produces false visions in Scorpion's mind, illustrating Sub-Zero's massacre of Shirai Ryu clan including Scorpion's wife and infant son some years earlier. An enraged Scorpion kills Sub-Zero as he did in the original timeline.

Liu Kang becomes the only remaining Earthrealm contender. He successfully defeats the Shokan Prince Goro, as well as the crafty sorcerer Shang Tsung. Raiden's amulet, however, cracks further, a sign that future events remain unchanged. Disappointed with the sorcerer's failure, emperor Shao Kahn orders Shang Tsung's execution, but is convinced otherwise when the sorcerer suggests holding a second tournament in Outworld with different stakes: if Earthrealm wins, Outworld will leave them alone forever, but if Outworld wins, they will be allowed to invade Earthrealm uninhibited. Though he initially refuses, Raiden relents when Tarkatans invade Earthrealm as part of Shang Tsung's blackmail against Earthrealm.

During the second tournament, Bi-Han's younger brother Kuai Liang decides to become the new Sub-Zero, and he and his friend Smoke arrive to avenge his brother. They are followed by Cyber Lin Kuei assassins Sektor and Cyrax, who came there under the command of the grandmaster Triborg, and are tasked with retrieving the rogue warriors for cybernetic conversion. Raiden changes the timeline by rescuing Smoke from being converted, at the cost of Kuai Liang being taken away. Kitana, the adopted daughter of Shao Kahn, chooses to join Earthrealm's fight after learning of the existence of her half-Tarkatan clone Mileena, created by Shang Tsung on Shao Kahn's orders, with Kitana's childhood friend Jade joining her later. In a bid to save Earth, Raiden substitutes Kung Lao in place of Liu Kang during the tournament. Following his victory over Shang Tsung, the ruler of Netherrealm, Quan Chi, and the fire-breathing Kintaro, Kung Lao's neck is snapped by Shao Kahn while his back was turned, killing him, with Liu Kang retaliating and mortally wounding the emperor in a fit of rage. Raiden's amulet continues to deteriorate and he becomes increasingly concerned.

Shao Kahn is healed by Quan Chi, at which point the two realms enter into an alliance. Quan Chi also revives and brainwashes Shao Kahn's long-dead wife, Sindel. In doing so, the ward that prevents Shao Kahn's physical access to Earthrealm is nullified and a full-scale invasion is now possible. Raiden saves Johnny Cage from certain death by slaying the centaurian Motaro. Joined by police officers Stryker and former Black Dragon member Kabal, the Earthrealm fighters attempt to stop Kahn's invasion. Kintaro severely burns Kabal but he is revived by Kano, which greatly increases Kabal's speed. Kahn dramatically enhances Sindel's power by sacrificing Tsung, taking the souls he has stolen for centuries and infusing them into Sindel. After losing nearly all of the cybernetic army and Kuai Liang to Raiden, Shao Kahn orders the execution of Triborg which he pleads to the Kahn not to do. However, Shao Kahn remains unmoved and under his orders, Quan Chi kills Triborg by absorbing his soul.

Raiden and Liu Kang travel to appeal to the Elder Gods, requesting they stop Shao Kahn's invasion. The Elder Gods refuse, saying that Kahn's invasion does not violate their laws, and that only attempting to merge Earthrealm into Outworld (without winning a Mortal Kombat tournament) would be a violation. Meanwhile at Earthrealm, Quan Chi tries to claim the souls of the Special Forces officers, but is interrupted by Nightwolf, Cyber Sub-Zero and Kabal. However, they are confronted by Noob Saibot, who is none other than Kuai Liang's brother Bi-Han who was resurrected by Quan Chi and Triborg, who was restored as an emotionless entity by Quan Chi himself without the knowledge of Shao Kahn, and both of them are killed when they are pushed into the Storm of Souls by Nightwolf and Cyber Sub-Zero.

While Raiden and Liu Kang are away, Sindel leads an Outworlder attack on the heroes. During the ensuing battle, Jax, Jade, Sub-Zero, Kabal, Stryker and Smoke are easily defeated and killed by Sindel, and Kitana is brutally beaten. Before Sindel can kill Kitana, Nightwolf intervenes and sacrifices himself in order to kill Sindel. Raiden and Liu Kang return soon after, and Kitana dies of her wounds after sharing her final words with Liu Kang, leaving Johnny Cage and Sonya Blade as the only survivors, but both of them are too injured to continue fighting.

Raiden attempts to ally with Quan Chi, offering the souls of the deceased heroes as payment (and his own soul if he dies). Quan Chi declines, and reveals he already has possession of the heroes' souls, promised to him by Shao Kahn in exchange for his allegiance to the emperor, and has turned them into undead "revenants". Quan Chi's words make the dismayed Raiden realize that "He must win" refers to Shao Kahn himself; should Kahn conquer Earthrealm without victory in Mortal Kombat, the Elder Gods will punish him. Liu Kang, angered by the seemingly pointless deaths of their allies, blames Raiden and goes to attack Shao Kahn alone. Raiden tries to stop Liu Kang, but accidentally kills him when Liu Kang's fire mixes with Raiden's lightning, burning Liu Kang alive. Overcome with guilt, Raiden surrenders to Shao Kahn, at which point, the Elder Gods intervene, imbuing Raiden with their power, which he then uses to defeat and kill Shao Kahn for violating the Mortal Kombat code.

After Shao Kahn's death, Raiden vows to rebuild Earthrealm with Cage and Blade. Quan Chi, now shown to be an agent of Shinnok, the exiled Elder God of darkness, reveals that the destruction of Shao Kahn and the weakening of Earthrealm by the death of their fighters was part of their plan to conquer all the realms for their own bidding.

== Characters ==
The game had 28 playable characters at launch. Four other fighters were DLC characters. The playable characters in bold are new to the series, while the italicized ones represents guest characters.

Base Roster	NPC	DLC
Baraka; **Cyber Sub-Zero**; Cyrax; Ermac; Jade; Jax; Johnny Cage; Kabal; Kano; Kitana; Kratos (PS3 only); Kung Lao; Liu Kang; Mileena; Nightwolf; Noob Saibot; Quan Chi; Raiden; Reptile; Scorpion; Sektor; Shang Tsung; Sheeva; Sindel; Smoke; Sonya Blade; Stryker; Sub-Zero	Goro; Kintaro; Shao Kahn	Freddy Krueger; Kenshi; Rain; **Skarlet**

Cyber Sub-Zero and Quan Chi are secret characters in the original PlayStation 3 and Xbox 360 versions, however they are unlocked in the Komplete Edition. Goro, Kintaro and Shao Kahn are only playable through mods. Kratos from the God of War series is a PlayStation exclusive. Sweet Tooth from the Twisted Metal series was considered to be the PlayStation exclusive before Kratos was chosen. Marcus Fenix from the Gears of War series was considered as a potential character for the Xbox 360 release. Tremor is included in the PlayStation Vita version, only in some character challenge towers. Motaro and Shinnok appear in a few cutscenes in the story mode.

== Development ==
In a November 2008 interview, Ed Boon stated that game sales for Mortal Kombat vs. DC Universe would dictate what features would appear in "the next game". In 2009, Midway Games Chicago filed for bankruptcy and was purchased by Warner Bros. Interactive. This led the game to be developed by NetherRealm Studios, becoming the first installment in the series to be published exclusively under the Warner Bros. label. On June 18, 2009, Boon confirmed on his Twitter page that developers were performing motion capture for the game and that it would not feature superheroes. Dan Forden was also expected to return as the music composer for the game. In late 2009, Boon stated that the franchise was returning to its bloody origins and that the production team were aiming for a "Mature" rating, as opposed to the "Teen" on the previous game. Boon also showed concern about content being classified under the "Adults Only" rating.

Mortal Kombat was officially revealed on June 10, 2010, with a release for the Xbox 360 and PlayStation 3 in 2011. It was revealed at the Sony E3 press conference that Mortal Kombat would be 3D compatible, and Boon said that in dealing with the 3D capability, more attention to detail was required so as to not obstruct the gameplay. Boon said that the extra mode from previous games ("The Krypt") would return with an "elaborate and sophisticated unlocking system" and put "the other games in the series to shame." He also said they intended for Mortal Kombat to be accessible to the casual player and more "engaging", with experts on the fighting genre consulted. New features were made to create a deeper fighting experience. Some mild humorous elements were also included, such as the Babality finishing moves. At the time, Boon said that the production team were considering a PC port of Mortal Kombat as "there seems to be a market for [PC games] in Europe."

Mortal Kombat runs on a heavily modified version of the Unreal Engine 3, similar to the engine used by its predecessor, Mortal Kombat vs. DC Universe. Developers recreated the entire fighting engine so that it was restricted to a two-dimensional plane of fighting, with senior producer Hans Lo stating at Gamescom 2010 that the change from 3D gameplay to 2D was advantageous for Mortal Kombat, as it increased graphical detail for characters and arenas and improved gameplay speed. Another new mechanic is the inclusion of "blood physics" (blood loss is portrayed as being more natural and being clearly visible on characters or surroundings). Developers stated that online gameplay for Mortal Kombat would be a main priority, declaring interest in capabilities to link the player's progression feed to their accounts on social networking websites such as Facebook and Twitter, and recreate the feel of socializing with players in an arcade.

According to Dave Pindara, one of the lead artists for Mortal Kombat, environments were developed to create active objects and effects such as "scripted cinema events", "dynamic lighting effects" and "characters and objects that animated and reacted to the fights." Arena development began with 18 arenas, but development of environments with different times of day and original arenas related to the plot scaled up arena development to roughly 30 arenas. One unique feature is included with each stage such as "The Desert" which has a "sand tech", allowing for realistic sand motion during characters' interaction. Dan Forden, lead sound designer, said the intent was to create a "cinematic game audio experience". Sound effect design included use and enhancement of the "bone-crunching audio design" of previous titles and, while the "dynamic experience" was vital, small details such as the "rustling of fighter's clothes" and background sounds were also included. Music for each stage was similar to previous games but with "a completely new arrangement".

Boon said that there was a focus on including characters from the first three Mortal Kombat games and that "if you have a favorite character from those games, you're probably going to see him or her in the game." The game's developers stated that the characters had been designed with the intent to make each character unique – each having his or her own individual stance, victory pose and Fatality with no shared animations. Lead designer John Edwards said that characters are differentiated by features such as power and speed. Producer Shaun Himmerick said that the internal and external character design required "two months or ten weeks". Boon said that an exclusive character was planned for the Xbox 360 version, but "unfortunately, the circumstances didn't allow us to make a 360 exclusive." Boon also said they were in talks to include Sweet Tooth from Sony's Twisted Metal franchise.

On April 5, 2011, Warner Bros. Interactive Entertainment and NetherRealm Studios announced Mortal Kombat was finished and ready for mass production, with pre-orders having gone "gold". Asked what would be the correct way to call it, for example "MK9" or "MK2011", Boon answered he would say "The Mortal Kombat game they rebooted in 2011."

Improving upon the introduction of a film-inspired "Story mode" in Mortal Kombat vs. DC Universe, NetherRealm Studios greatly increased the number and sophisitcation of staff working on Mortal Kombat's story mode. Ed Boon motivated the development team to tell the " [...] stories that we've been telling through text, endings in the arcade, and other not as sophisticated forms of media [...]" through a cinematic lens similarly to how they crafted the "Story Mode" of Mortal Kombat vs. DC Universe. According to Marty Stoltz, from the beginning of development, storyboard artists and animators were involved with every aspect of the game at some level:

"It's a large team for sure. It's almost like half a studio, I think, [in terms] of everybody that touches something in it, [...] From the beginning, we're going to work with storyboard artists. We go to the next stage, which will be to board-o-matics. And then I'll start working with the animation team at some point, right before we're ready to shoot...and down the line, it's going to be effects people, audio people, composers are brought in to do the music. And we have a team that goes and shoots just the Vcams itself. So we have handheld modern-looking camera that has to be shot. Pretty much all the cinemas are reshot with a comparable weighted Vcam that gets the style we want. So there's another crew that comes in. So that's a pretty massive endeavor."

Ed Boon, who initially pitched the story mode to his team during the development of Mortal Kombat vs. DC Universe, viewed the single-player mode as a major source of appeal to casual fans who would have otherwise not paid attention to a fighting game.

== Marketing ==
On August 31, 2010, a teaser trailer "Shadows" debuted on IGN, featuring a track "Another Way to Die" from the band Disturbed's album Asylum. On September 28, 2010, the slogan "Kombat Begins In ..." appeared with a clock counting down on the Mortal Kombat official website, the countdown ending on Monday October 11, 2010. At the conclusion of the countdown, a link to the Facebook page was added to the website and an accompanying Facebook application was also released that showcased a teaser trailer for the game.

On October 4, 2010, the "Environment Bio" trailer of the Mortal Kombat arena, The Pit, was released to explain the in-game backstory on its origins and evolution. Similar videos featuring The Living Forest, the Dead Pool, and Kahn's Coliseum were released afterward, also explaining background information on the stages. In a similar fashion, character profile videos were released for Scorpion, Sub-Zero, Mileena, Liu Kang and Raiden. In April 2011, Playboy models Jo Garcia and Brittney Palmer (dressed as Mileena and Kitana, respectively) promoted the game in a sponsored vlog advertisement. In April 2011, Bespoke Arcades created a series of arcade machines to promote the game at the Gadget Show Live 2011. In April 2012, two live-action cosplay trailers featuring Rachelle Glover (Kitana) and Danni Levy (Mileena) were released; they were later combined into one commercial video titled "Fight Anywhere".

On March 8, 2011, a demo version of the game was released for download globally, initially exclusively for PlayStation Plus members. The demo (an arcade ladder with single- or two-player capability) showcases four characters (Johnny Cage, Mileena, Scorpion and Sub-Zero) and the stages The Living Forest and The Pit. Performance Design Products sponsored the inaugural National Mortal Kombat Championship, which took place in Las Vegas in May 2011. Mortal Kombat was also internationally presented in the 2011 Evolution Championship Series (Evo), being recognized as a "main tournament fighting game". "Professional gamers" Justin Wong (winner of the PDP championship) and Carl 'Perfect Legend' White (the Evo 2011 champion) spoke positively of Mortal Kombat's place in future tournament events.

== Release ==
=== Retail versions ===
Mortal Kombat was available for pre-order in three different editions: Standard, Kollector's Edition (includes a copy of the game, art book, Sub-Zero and Scorpion figurine bookends and a downloadable content (DLC) skin, dubbed a Mortal Kombat Klassic costume), and the Tournament Edition (includes a fight stick controller instead of the bookends and art book). A European version of the Kollector's Edition was also released, which includes the game, art book, a Scorpion & Sub-Zero figurine, a Steelbook case and downloadable skins.

In the United States, pre-orders at retailers Toys "R" Us and Wal-Mart were provided with classic Mortal Kombat skins for Kitana and Mileena, modeled after their Ultimate Mortal Kombat 3 appearances. A classic Jade skin (also using her UMK3 model) was also included with pre-orders of Mortal Kombat or Mortal Kombat Annihilation on Blu-ray (both released April 19, 2011). GameStop, Best Buy and Amazon.com also participated in pre-order bonuses and included classic costumes and Fatalities for Scorpion, Sub-Zero and Reptile respectively. Mortal Kombat-themed costumes were also provided for the owners of Xbox 360 avatars who preordered any version of the game. Kratos, the protagonist from the God of War series, was included as a guest character in the PlayStation versions, and an extra stage from that series—"Chamber of the Flame"— was included only in the PlayStation 3 release.

=== Downloadable content ===
NetherRealm Studios released the Klassic DLC pack (containing the classic outfits and Fatalities that were exclusive to pre-order deals) on June 7, 2011. Downloadable characters include Skarlet (a newly introduced red female character based on a glitch rumor from Mortal Kombat II), Kenshi (first introduced in Mortal Kombat: Deadly Alliance), Rain (first seen in Ultimate Mortal Kombat 3), and Freddy Krueger from the A Nightmare on Elm Street franchise. A free compatibility pack is available alongside each character that contains "klassic" skins for two characters and is available to all players. Warner Bros. suggested Neo from The Matrix as a guest character, NetherRealm rejected it as they felt that Neo wouldn't fit. A "Season Pass" available to Xbox 360 users offered the first four DLC characters together at an overall discounted price. Warner Bros. is one of the first game companies that introduced the concept of season pass: a long term, pre-paid, post-launch downloadable content plan.

=== PlayStation Vita port ===
The PlayStation Vita version of Mortal Kombat was announced on January 18, 2012. It was released on May 1, 2012, in North America and on May 4 in Europe. The Vita version of the game includes all the features from the PlayStation 3 version of Komplete Edition, and adds new costumes and a new Challenge Tower that are not available in the console versions, as well as touchscreen controls for finishing moves and other exclusive features, but removes one stage. The online servers for the Vita port were shut down on July 16, 2014.

=== Mortal Kombat: Komplete Edition ===
On January 9, 2012, Warner Bros Interactive Entertainment announced Mortal Kombat: Komplete Edition. This version was released for the Xbox 360 and PlayStation 3 on February 28, 2012, in North America and on March 2 in the United Kingdom, and consists of the game with all of the downloadable content released for it. The North American release also includes download codes for the album Mortal Kombat: Songs Inspired by the Warriors, as well as the 1995 film Mortal Kombat (available via the PlayStation Store or Xbox Live).

In May 2011, Ed Boon hinted on his Twitter account that a Mac version of the game was more likely than a PC one. By February 2012, developers stated there were no immediate plans for a PC version, but were "gauging interest". On May 22, 2013, it was announced that the Komplete Edition would be released for Windows on July 3, 2013. Initially, the game became only available through Steam but a retail version followed during the first days of August.

As of March 21, 2020, Mortal Kombat: Komplete Edition has been removed from Steam due to changes with Warner Brother Games' network.

== Reception ==
=== Critical reception ===
Reception

Aggregate score
Aggregator	Score
Metacritic	PS3: 84/100; X360: 86/100; PS3 (Komplete Edition): 77/100; X360: (Komplete Edition): 88/100; VITA: 85/100; PC: 81/100

Review scores
Publication	Score
1Up.com	A−
Eurogamer	7/10
Game Informer	9.5/10; VITA: 9/10
GameSpot	8.5/10; VITA: 8.0/10
GamesRadar+	4/5
GameZone	9.0/10
IGN	8.0/10; VITA: 8.5/10

Awards
Publication	Award
Spike Video Game Awards	Best Fighting Game
Golden Joystick Awards	Best Fighting Game
15th Annual Interactive Achievement Awards	Fighting Game of the Year

Prior to the game's release, Techtree listed Mortal Kombat as "one of the reasons for people to own a gaming console in 2011", with PC Magazine and 2D-X editor Jeffrey L. Wilson claiming this was one of the most anticipated titles of E3 2010. The E3 2010 showcase version of Mortal Kombat received the Best Fighting Game of E3 and Best Stage Demo of E3 awards by GameSpot, Later, Mortal Kombat won several Game of the Year type awards for the best fighting game of 2011, such as from the Golden Joystick Awards, the Spike Video Game Awards, and the Interactive Achievement Awards.

Mortal Kombat received critical acclaim from critics. GameZone's David Sanchez considered calling the game as "a fitting reboot for the series" would be an understatement, and stated that the game, "while offering plenty of nostalgia", is "a major step up for the series". Andrew Reiner of Game Informer called it "the best Mortal Kombat yet." According to Mark Waltron of GameSpot, "over-the-top, bloody, and bursting with content, Mortal Kombat is a return to form for the franchise." IGN's Ryan Clements called it an "amazing" game that "combines the novelty of extreme violence with a great fighting engine." Neidel Crisan of 1UP.com stated it "has simply set the standard for future fighting games to follow." Eurogamer's Matt Edwards was more critical of the game, but added that "to judge Mortal Kombat harshly simply because it isn't the equal of BlazBlue or Street Fighter IV on a technical level would be unfair to what the game does right." Brett Elston of GamesRadar was also more cautious in his review, stating it is "a successful sequel that both reboots and redeems the wayward series, though it's not a flawless victory."

Mortal Kombat's gameplay was generally well-received due to its balance, violence, and use of what GameTrailers called a "classic 2D template". Reiner wrote that "the only area where Mortal Kombat feels antiquated is in its AI." Waltron praised the game for having "one of the most in-depth story modes to grace a fighting game." Crisan compared it to "watching a full length CG movie", and said that while "incredibly corny, it's also oddly addicting" due to its over-the-top plot. One complaint concerned the shifting levels of difficulty in the game's story mode, described by Clements as forcing the player "to fight cheap tactics with cheap tactics." According to Elston, "character balance, inconsistent detection and a stingy coin reward system drag down an otherwise bloody good time."

One year after the game's release, GameZone's Sanchez stated that Mortal Kombat has still remained "the best fighter currently on the market," calling it "today's greatest modern fighter" and "one of the most compelling fighters to come along in years."

The PlayStation Vita version of the game was also well received. Dan Ryckert of Game Informer called it "the most complete version of Mortal Kombat available," while Brett Zeidler of Destructoid hailed it as "a perfect example of keeping the best graphical fidelity possible and including an already astronomical amount of content." According to Walton, "despite a few control issues" regarding tag team combos, "Mortal Kombat on the Vita is every bit the great and gruesome fighter as its console counterparts." Steven Hopper of IGN recommended this "great port" for those who did not play the original release enough.

The PC version of Mortal Kombat: Komplete Edition was well-received despite being released two years after the console versions; the PC version received an 81/100 score on Metacritic. In August 2013, questioned about the sales performance of the Windows version of the game, Boon tweeted that it was "WAY, WAY above expectations".

=== Controversy ===
In February 2011, the game was refused classification by the Australian Classification Board due to "violence that exceeds strong in impact". Warner Bros. unsuccessfully appealed the decision to the Classification Review Board, who ruled "the impact of the violence in Mortal Kombat is higher than strong and thus could not be accommodated within the MA15+ classification." The Australian Customs and Border Protection Service listed the game as a prohibited item and the Australian Minister for Home Affairs Brendan O'Connor asked to be briefed on the Mortal Kombat decision, citing "public disquiet on the issue". In 2012, the Vita version of Mortal Kombat was banned in Australia as well. A spokesperson for Warner Bros. commented: "We felt that because of the Vita's size, the smaller screen would minimise the impact of the violence in the game and we felt it might fit within the MA15+ category. Obviously, the Classification Board of Australia did not agree." In 2013, however, following the introduction of an R18+ classification, the Komplete edition of Mortal Kombat was released uncensored on May 1, 2013, with the R18+ rating.

Mortal Kombat was also indexed in Germany by the Federal Department for Media Harmful to Young Persons due to "drastic representations of violence," and was banned in South Korea due to its excessive depiction of blood and gore.

=== Sales ===
According to Ed Boon, during its release month, Mortal Kombat sold one million copies between both PlayStation 3 and Xbox versions. Warner Bros. Interactive Entertainment, publisher of NetherRealm Studios' Mortal Kombat, reported that Mortal Kombat had sold close to three million units as of August 2011. According to Warner Bros., this covered the cost of the entire Midway asset acquisition. By 2013, the game had sold closer to 4 million.

=== Legacy ===
NetherRealm Studios' success with Mortal Kombat's story mode influenced future Mortal Kombat entries and NetherRealm's Injustice series, and inspired developers of future fighting games to create similar film-inspired experiences in their games, like Guilty Gear Xrd, Tekken 7, Street Fighter V, and Marvel vs. Capcom: Infinite.

== Sequel ==
A sequel for the game, Mortal Kombat X, was developed by NetherRealm Studios for Microsoft Windows, PlayStation 4, and Xbox One and was released in April 2015.
