= Shang Tsung =

Mortal Kombat character

- Mortal Kombat character
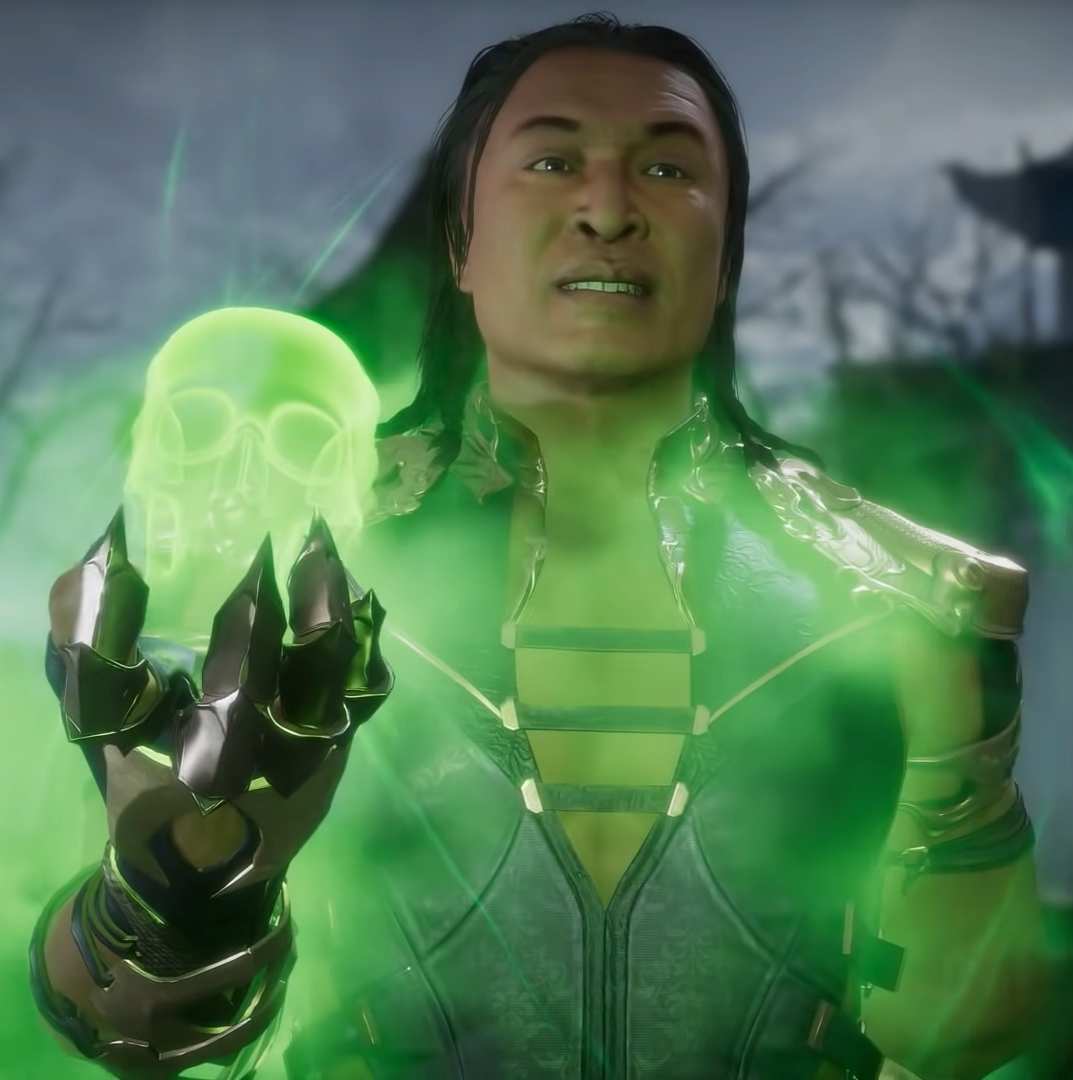
- Shang Tsung in Mortal Kombat 11 (2019)
- First appearance: Mortal Kombat (1992)
- Created by: Ed Boon; John Tobias
- Designed by: John Tobias
- Voiced by: Various: Ed Boon (MK); Jim Cummings (The Journey Begins); Neil Ross (Defenders of the Realm); Christian Munoz (MK:D); Knute Horowitz (MK:A); James Kyson (MKvsDCU); Andrew Kishino (2011 game); Cary-Hiroyuki Tagawa (MK11); Artt Butler (Scorpion's Revenge, Battle of the Realms, Snow Blind); Alan Lee (MK1, MKO)
- Portrayed by: Various: Cary-Hiroyuki Tagawa (1995 film, Legacy); Richard Divizio (MKM:SZ); Bruce Locke (Conquest); James Lew (Rebirth); Johnson Phan (Legacy); Chin Han (2021 film)
- Motion capture: Various: Ho-Sung Pak (MK); Philip Ahn (MKII); John Turk (MK3, UMK3, MKT); Chris Bashen (MKvs.DCU); Cary-Hiroyuki Tagawa (MK11, MK:O)

In-universe information
- Origin: Earthrealm; Outworld
- Nationality: Chinese

Shang Tsung
- Traditional Chinese: 尚宗
Transcriptions
Standard Mandarin
- Hanyu Pinyin: Shàng Zōng
- Wade–Giles: Shang^{4} Tsung^{1}

Shang Tsung (Chinese: 尚宗) is a fictional character and one of the main antagonists of the Mortal Kombat fighting game franchise by Midway Games and NetherRealm Studios. He debuted as the main antagonist of Mortal Kombat (1992) and has remained one of the franchise's primary characters. Shang is a sorcerer; he is principally defined by his abilities to shapeshift into other characters and to absorb the souls of his defeated opponents. In the series, he is usually confronted by the series' protagonist Liu Kang. Shang has appeared in various media outside of the games, including the 1995 film and the 2021 film. He has received positive commentary for his design, abilities, and role in the series.

== Creation ==
"Shang Lao's" design and story in John Tobias' sketchbook (1990)

Shang Tsung (originally named "Shang Lao") was based on a "Chinese sorcerer" archetype from martial arts films, including but not limited to the character Lo Pan from the film Big Trouble in Little China. He was originally envisioned as the one who would behead the losing fighter, prior to the concept of character-specific Shang Fatalities. A cut character named "Kitsune", which was later developed into Kitana, "was going to fit into the story as Shang Lao's (Tsung's) princess daughter - the spoil of victory for winning the tournament", who would betray her father after she fell for Liu Kang. However, mid-development, Boon and the team thought it would be fun to put the finishing power in the player's hands, and started coming up with gruesome ways we could finish off their enemies rather than just Shang Tsung. So it was going to be just the boss, but just "goofing around one time" they made Johnny Cage duck down and uppercut the sorcerer. Following this test, the staff decided to turn everybody into finishers. The original idea was that Shang Tsung was a human traitor who had sold his soul. Mortal Kombat art director Herman Sanchez said that as the series progressed he decided to emphasize Tsung's air of "sinister regality."

Shang Tsung's design varies throughout the series. The initial history of the character was explained in the 1992 Midway-produced comic book based on the original MK game, in which he was the first-ever Mortal Kombat (then the Shaolin Tournament) champion over 500 years ago from the date of the then-current tournament depicted in the actual game, yet he was stricken with a curse that forced him to consume the souls of his defeated opponents in order to keep his youth. The book cited his "failure to appease the gods" as the reason for his premature aging to a withered old man, but he was noticeably younger in Mortal Kombat II, in which Shao Kahn had restored Shang Tsung's youth and powers as part of his plan to take over Earthrealm by luring Liu Kang and his fellow Earth warriors into Outworld for the next MK tournament. His actor in the sequel changed to Philip Ahn, turning from the original game's Ho-Sung Pak.

According to GamePro magazine in 1993, the MKII version of Shang Tsung was nineteen years old, and an article about the game also included a rough sketch by Mortal Kombat co-creator John Tobias of Tsung's "true form," a twisted demon, which has never actually appeared in the video games. Tobias wanted Shang Tsung's long hair to hang loose in Mortal Kombat 3 (in which his actor was John Turk), but potential problems with it flopping about whenever he jumped resulted in it being tied back into a ponytail. Responding to player queries about how Shang Tsung's last name is pronounced, Acclaim Entertainment stated in 1994 that there is no one definitively correct way of pronouncing the character's name.

In the original Mortal Kombat game Shang Tsung is a computer-controlled boss that launches fireball projectiles (consisting of a flaming skull, in contrast to Liu Kang's fireball which is shaped like a Chinese dragon) and can morph into other characters at will; this gives him access to all of the Kombatants' signature moves. The character was originally given the morphing ability due to technical limitations as the arcade machines for the game had no memory left for his images. As a player character in MKII, he retains his morphing ability, but can only transform into playable characters (although he can transform into the non-playable sub-boss Kintaro for a fatality). His flaming skull projectile's versatility is also expanded: he can summon skulls from above or below the opponent as well as shoot multiple skulls from his hands. Tsung's shapeshifting went mostly unused in Deadly Alliance, Deception, Armageddon, and Mortal Kombat vs. DC Universe. Ed Boon explained this was due to a lack of sufficient memory. After the ending of Mortal Kombat 11, Ed Boon decided to cast Tagawa as Shang Tsung for Aftermath as he believes several gamers often visualize him when seeing the character. Despite being presented as an anti-hero, Boon acknowledges that everybody knows he is the actual villain instead and they look forward to the obvious revelation. Tagawa himself said that Mortal Kombat in general was one of the biggest experiences in his career, having enjoyed both films and gaming citing the franchise's length in general. For Mortal Kombat 1, Shang Tsung is returning as a major villain but according to Boon he will not be final one.

== Appearances ==
=== Mortal Kombat games ===
First appearing in the Mortal Kombat comic and Mortal Kombat game (1992), Shang Tsung was a sorcerer cursed by his gods to steal souls lest he age rapidly and die prematurely. Nonetheless, he discovered that stealing souls allowed him to absorb his victims' knowledge and fighting prowess. After entering and eventually becoming Grand Champion of the first Mortal Kombat tournament, he became its coordinator and went on to aid the otherworldly realm of Outworld win nine consecutive Mortal Kombat tournaments with the intention of using the tenth to allow Outworld's tyrant Shao Kahn to conquer Earthrealm. However, Shang Tsung and his protégé and champion Goro are defeated by the Shaolin monk Liu Kang.

In Mortal Kombat II, Shao Kahn restores Shang Tsung's youth so the latter can resurrect the former's queen Sindel as part of Shao Kahn's efforts to merge Outworld with Earthrealm. While hunting survivors of the plot however, Shang Tsung is defeated by Liu Kang once more.

In Mortal Kombat: Deadly Alliance and Mortal Kombat: Deception, Shang Tsung joins forces with fellow sorcerer Quan Chi in a bid to conquer the realms by resurrecting Onaga the Dragon King's undead army, only for Onaga to be revived and reclaim his army. The sorcerers join forces with Earthrealm's protector Raiden in a failed attempt to defeat Onaga, but the pair are killed in the process. Nonetheless, Shang Tsung is resurrected during Mortal Kombat Armageddon.

In Mortal Kombat (2011), Raiden alters the timeline to avert the events of Armageddon. Despite this, Shang Tsung's role plays out as it did in the original trilogy until Shao Kahn eventually steals his soul to empower Sindel.

As of the Mortal Kombat 11 DLC story expansion Aftermath, Shang Tsung was resurrected and imprisoned in the Void by the keeper of time, Kronika, after he refused to aid her in seeking revenge on Raiden by destroying the timeline. Ever since, he secretly began plotting his own revenge. After Fire God Liu Kang kills her and gains control of her Hourglass, Shang Tsung, Fujin, and Nightwolf emerge from the Void and warn him that he can cannot use the Hourglass to restore the timeline without her Crown of Souls. Liu Kang sends the trio back in time to retrieve a past version of it, during which the sorcerer orchestrates events to ensure that he can gain the Crown with little to no opposition from Earthrealm, Outworld, and Kronika's forces. Once they are all defeated, Shang Tsung attempts to restart history for himself, only to discover that Liu Kang had manipulated events to ensure the sorcerer's victory over Kronika. During their subsequent battle, they unknowingly fracture time further, resulting in two timelines where each of them defeated the other, became a Titan, and used Kronika's Hourglass to forge their own timelines, with Shang Tsung going on to conquer the various realms.

In Mortal Kombat 1, Titan Shang Tsung eventually discovers Liu Kang's timeline, where a powerless version of the former exists as a struggling snake oil salesman in Outworld. Assuming Kronika's form and the alias of "Damashi", Titan Shang Tsung secretly helps him and a similarly powerless Quan Chi regain their powers and infiltrate Empress Sindel's court with further help from Outworld patriot General Shao. Additionally, Shang Tsung enslaved Reptile to study his ability to shapeshift, helps treat Sindel's daughter and crown princess Mileena's Tarkat disease, and turns Sindel and Sub-Zero of the Lin Kuei clan against Earthrealm. After Sindel eventually learns the truth of his and Quan Chi's treachery and joins forces with Liu Kang to stop him, the sorcerers are betrayed by Titan Shang Tsung, who intends to absorb Liu Kang's timeline. Reluctantly working with Earthrealm and Outworld, the sorcerers assist Liu Kang in thwarting and killing Titan Shang Tsung. Following this, Shang Tsung is imprisoned in Lei Chin prison, but later breaks out and attempts to return to his childhood home to recuperate and plot revenge. While travelling by sea however, a storm sends him to a deserted island that had been previously used by powerful sorcerers and contains a "Well of Souls".

=== Other media ===
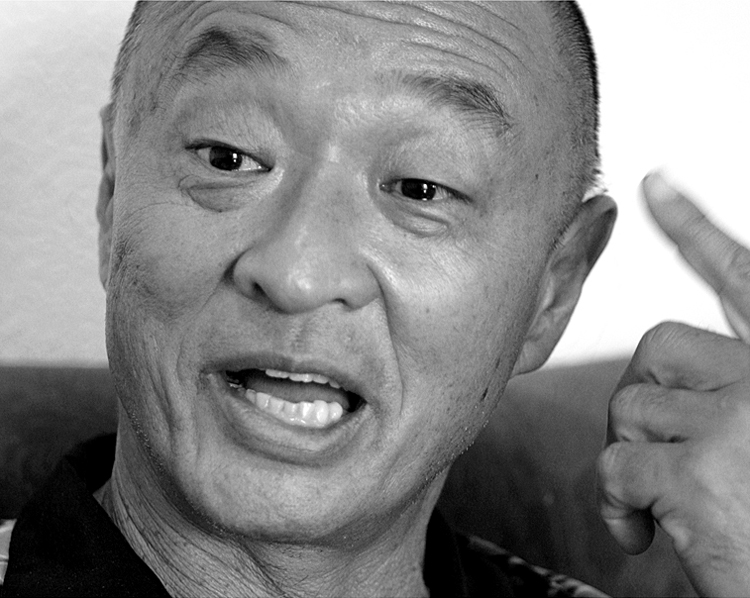
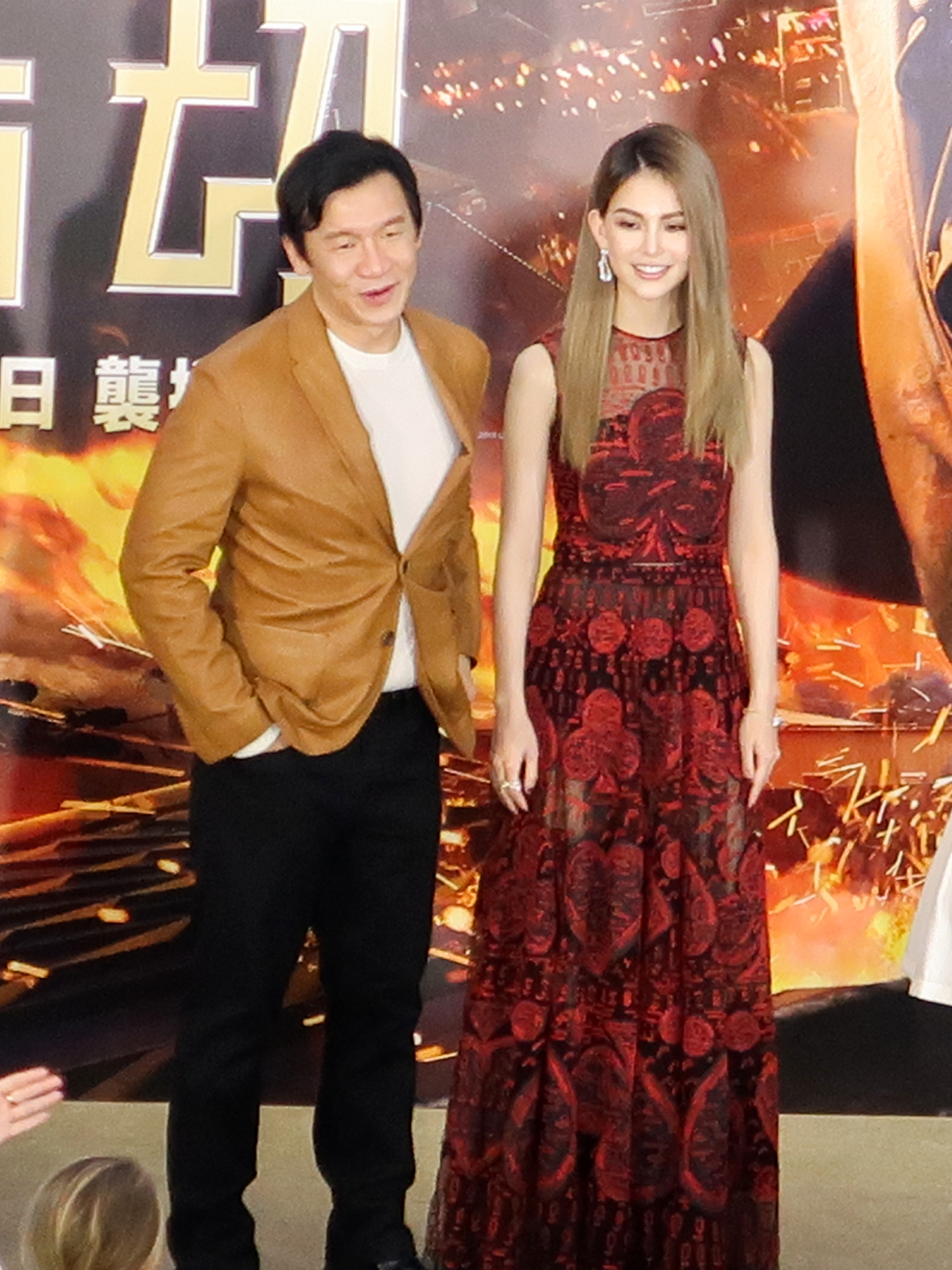
Cary-Hiroyuki Tagawa and Chin Han, who portrayed Shang Tsung in Mortal Kombat (1995) and Mortal Kombat (2021) respectively

Shang Tsung appears in Malibu Comics' Blood & Thunder miniseries. In addition to his original video game trilogy backstory, he displays a bitter rivalry with Raiden that usually end in verbal assaults or draws. While hosting the tenth Mortal Kombat tournament for Shao Kahn's plot to conquer Earthrealm, Shang Tsung secretly attempts to acquire the mystical book Tao Te Zhan, which grants immense power to whoever solves its seven riddles. When Goro seeks the book, Shang Tsung and Raiden join forces to stop him. Shang Tsung also makes further appearances in the succeeding Battlewave miniseries along with DC Comics' Mortal Kombat X prequel comic.

Shang Tsung appears in Mortal Kombat (1995), portrayed by Cary-Hiroyuki Tagawa. While hosting the Mortal Kombat tournament, he employs intimidation tactics and trickery to manipulate its outcome until he is defeated and killed by Liu Kang, who sought revenge on him for killing his brother Chan. Shang Tsung also appears in the prequel Mortal Kombat: The Journey Begins, voiced by Jim Cummings. Here, it is revealed this version also possesses telepathy, allowing him to predict enemy attacks and adapt his strategy to exploit their weaknesses.

Shang Tsung appears in Mortal Kombat: Defenders of the Realm, voiced by Neil Ross.

Shang Tsung appears in Mortal Kombat: Conquest, portrayed by Bruce Locke. This version seeks revenge on the Great Kung Lao, who defeated him in Mortal Kombat. For this, Shao Kahn put Shang Tsung to work in the former's cobalt mines, where he enslaves and abuses fellow prisoner and Kreevan princess Vorpax. Though Shang Tsung later escapes, he is defeated by Shao Kahn's Shadow Priests.

Shang Tsung makes a cameo appearance in Mortal Kombat: Rebirth, portrayed by James Lew, and the Death Battle! episode "Akuma vs. Shang Tsung".

Shang Tsung appears in Mortal Kombat: Legacy portrayed by Johnson Phan in the episode "Johnny Cage" and Tagawa in the second season.

Shang Tsung appears in Mortal Kombat Legends: Scorpion's Revenge and Mortal Kombat Legends: Battle of the Realms, voiced by Artt Butler.

Shang Tsung appears in Mortal Kombat (2021), portrayed by Chin Han. Upon learning of a prophecy that will deny Outworld a crucial victory in the Mortal Kombat tournament, Shang Tsung sends his warriors to kill Earthrealm's champions before then. Though they are defeated, Shang Tsung threatens retaliation. Han reprises his role in the sequel Mortal Kombat II.

== Reception ==
The character was met with a positive critical reception. Shang Tsung was ranked 17th on GameDaily's 2009 list of top evil masterminds of all time, which noted his attack style and goals while stating he is "one twisted freak." That same year, GamesRadar listed him as one of the top villains who will never stay dead. He was also sixth on GamesRadar's list of most misunderstood videogame villains. GamesRadar also listed his Fatality where he morphs into Kintaro from Mortal Kombat II as one of "ten greatest things about Mortal Kombat". In 2010, Shang Tsung was ranked 97th in IGN's list of top video game villains, with a comment that "considering Shang Tsung's devious powers and his cruel methods, his status as a reputable villain of the series is well deserved." Den of Geek said that while he never looked as menacing as the sub-boss Goro, his shapeshifting powers would surprise the player while his personality surprised the audience, making him one of the best bosses in fighting game history.

Some critics have condemned the Mortal Kombat series racist, especially regarding its Asian characters. Guy Aoki, the president of the advocacy group Media Action Network for Asian Americans, rebuked Mortal Kombat II in 1994 for allegedly perpetuating existing stereotypes of Asians as martial arts experts including Shang Tsung, Liu Kang, among others. Allyne Mills, publicist for the game's publisher Acclaim Entertainment, answered: "This is a fantasy game, with all different characters. This is a martial arts game which comes from Asia. The game was not created to foster stereotypes." The characters' racial diversity and the inclusion of female characters were also criticized by the psychologists Patricia Marks Greenfield and Rodney R. Cocking in their 1996 book Interacting with Video, writing they "cannot assume that this greater diversity represents a more progressive identity politics, for one could argue that it merely increases the racist and sexist potential of the individual fights." In Game of Death, David Church found Liu Kang and Shang Tsung as obvious references Lee and Han from Enter the Dragon. Despite finding him as an appealing villain, Club Nintendo criticized Shang Tsung for being remembered more as a servant to other major villains, an ally to others as well as one who breaks the trust he has with his own allies.

He was also ranked as third in Game Revolution's list of top old school Mortal Kombat characters for his ability to morph into other fighters during battles. Game Rant ranked Shang Tsung at number five on their list of "most awesome" Mortal Kombat characters, praising his ability to transform into other characters and adding "despite Shang Tsung's limited arsenal of unique special attacks, the character still provides experienced players with a stylish way to dispatch opponents." In UGO's 2012 list of top Mortal Kombat characters, Shang Tsung placed at 15th. Complex placed this "cold-blooded mastermind" at the top of their lists of the greatest wizards in games in 2012, calling him the "coolest video game wizard ever, by far," and of the most brutal fighters in Mortal Kombat in 2013. In 2013, Complex also included his transformation into Kintaro and his "Soul Purge" in MK3 among the best finishing moves in the series. Shang Tsung also became famous in the Deadly Alliance intro cutscene for killing the hero Liu Kang which surprised game journalist for the impact such dark twist had on the main narrative.

Cary Hiroyuki Tagawa's take on Shang Tsung is now regarded as the ideal portrayal of the sorcerer. JoBlo.com noted that every actor who has taken the role since have been compared to Tagawa, commenting that his delivery "has all the cadence and embellished style like he's on Broadway, but he holds himself physically like he's just casually laying down the law. Tagawa is Shang Tsung." Screen Rant reported that while they felt all the main cast members were equally outstanding, Tagawa was "the best casting of the movie to many". While reviewing Legacy, IGN said "the most noteworthy bit of recasting involves Shang Tsung" due to Tagawa's appeal on the character especially with his age despite there not being connections to the 1995 Mortal Kombat movie.

Tagawa's portrayal of Shang Tsung in Mortal Kombat 11: Aftermath was praised by HobbyConsolas for often being the center of attention in his scenes. The Washington Post praised the handling of Shang Tsung in Mortal Kombat 11 in general to the point he is a more enjoyable than the already striking DLC RoboCop due to his charismatic and manipulative characterization when working alongside Raiden's forces to obtain the power he wanted. In retrospect, the site said "Tagawa gave the most memorable performance of the movie." which further proves the reason to why the Aftermath storyline is so appealing despite being an obvious villain working with the heroes.
