= Controversies surrounding Mortal Kombat =

Noob Saibot performing his "Make-A-Wish" Fatality on Jade in Mortal Kombat (2011). This installment's more realistic 3D graphics, and Mortal Kombat's renewed popularity, brought the series back into the center of the controversy spotlight after years of relative obscurity and being overshadowed by other games with violent content, such as the Grand Theft Auto series.

The Mortal Kombat series of fighting games, created by Ed Boon and John Tobias, has been the subject of various controversies since its creation in 1992. In particular, Mortal Kombat has often been criticised by a broad spectrum of politicians and other critics for its unrestrained use of graphic and bloody violence, both in the game's regular combat scenes and its Fatalities—finishing moves that allow the player to kill or otherwise maim the defeated opponents.

The violent nature of the series, one of the earliest of its kind, has led to the creation and continued presence of the Entertainment Software Rating Board (ESRB) in 1994, and other video game content rating systems. Various Mortal Kombat games have been censored or banned in several countries, and the franchise was the subject of several court cases. In Germany, many Mortal Kombat games were indexed or banned. Mortal Kombat (2011) is also banned in South Korea, and was banned in Australia until February 2013, while Mortal Kombat 11 is banned in Indonesia, Mainland China, and Ukraine. Japan required the developers censor some parts of the game to release it but the studio declined. The issue of cultural appropriation was also widely discussed with regard to the character designs and storylines.

== Controversies and censorship ==
In the past year, some very violent and offensive games have reached the mark, and of course I'm speaking about Mortal Kombat and Night Trap.

— Nintendo of America vice president Howard Lincoln, testifying before the U.S. Congress on the video game violence controversy in 1993

The Mortal Kombat series, particularly its "Fatalities", was a source of major controversy at the time of its release. (Note: According to The Realm of Mortal Kombat editor-in-chief and site manager, Jeff Greeson, "everything was over the top. From the pools of blood spewing from your character, to the outrageous gruesomeness of the game's fatalities. Mortal Kombat not only shocked anyone who had ever played the game, but those who simply walked by the game were mesmerized by its gore. Mortal Kombat was generally quiet in the arcades, at least as far as lawmakers were concerned. Once Acclaim received the rights to bring the game to the home console markets, they brought [it] into the spotlight of the general public. The media picked up on the fears that the public had of bringing such violent imagery into their homes through a device that children played with. ... When you pinpoint and highlight the game's violence and nothing else, it was hard to be a defender of the game during that time.") A moral panic over the series, fueled by outrage from the mass media, resulted in a Congressional hearing and helped to pave the way for the creation of the Entertainment Software Rating Board (ESRB) game rating system. In 2010, Mortal Kombat co-creator and long-time producer Ed Boon revealed that he had actually sympathized with much of the outrage and admitted, "I wouldn't want my ten-year-old kid playing a game like that."

=== 1993 U.S. Congressional hearing and response ===
On a couple of occasions there have been cheats which opened up taboo content and caused concern amongst the devout followers of Mary Whitehouse. Mortal Kombat had bloody violence as a standard feature in the arcades, but when it came home the ketchup needed to be activated with a code. Every version had this feature, with the exception of the versions on Nintendo's consoles due to content guidelines. Mortal Kombat became one of the key games leading to the 1993 US Senate hearings on videogame violence, which led to the creation of the ESRB. While Nintendo had proudly trumpeted its less violent Mortal Kombat, the lure of the dollar was too much and Mortal Kombat II was released with blood on all formats.

— "Sex and violence", Retro Gamer

During the U.S. Congressional hearing on video game violence, Democratic Party Senator Herb Kohl, working with Senator Joe Lieberman, attempted to illustrate why government regulation of video games was needed by showing clips from 1992's Mortal Kombat and Night Trap (another game featuring digitized actors). Brought in as an expert, Professor Eugene F. Provenzo commented that such games "have almost TV-quality graphics [but] are overwhelmingly violent, sexist and racist." Nintendo, which had a policy of screening games for content like blood, had refused to allow gore in Mortal Kombat's release for their home system. Meanwhile, their rival, Sega, released the game with their MA-13 rating, resulting in a great commercial success for them when millions of consumers chose their version over Nintendo's. Nintendo's representatives attempted to use that fact to attack Sega during the hearings. (Note: As narrated by Greeson, "in the hearing, a Nintendo representative attacked Sega for its release of violent games and said his own company had tried to mitigate the industry's worst excesses. In response, the Sega representative pulled out a prop - a bazooka-style gun accessory used by some Nintendo games - and asked if that was the appropriate means to teach nonviolence to children.")

In response to these developments, Sega's Spanish division cancelled the release of their version of Mortal Kombat in Spain, fearing the game would stir up as much controversy there as it had in the United States and the United Kingdom. Lieberman had been one of the first politicians to voice concerns over Mortal Kombat in 1993, and continued to be one of the most avid critics of violent video games. He later referenced the series and DOOM in a 1996 statement, when he joined Kohl and the psychologist David Walsh in a campaign to inform Congress about the new wave of violent games such as Resident Evil.

During the 2000s, however, the controversy surrounding the series had wound down significantly. In 2006, AP writer Lou Kesten wrote that while Lieberman had remained "one of the video game industry's most persistent critic[s,] Mortal Kombat is no longer the flashpoint of the game violence debate. Its brand of mano-a-mano brawling is seen as kind of old-fashioned today, now that the likes of Grand Theft Auto are serving up the indiscriminate slaughter of innocent civilians." Time commented in 2012 that "the reason the 1992 classic remains seminal is because it broke an implicit taboo about what was okay to put in a game."

=== Game ratings, bans and censorship ===
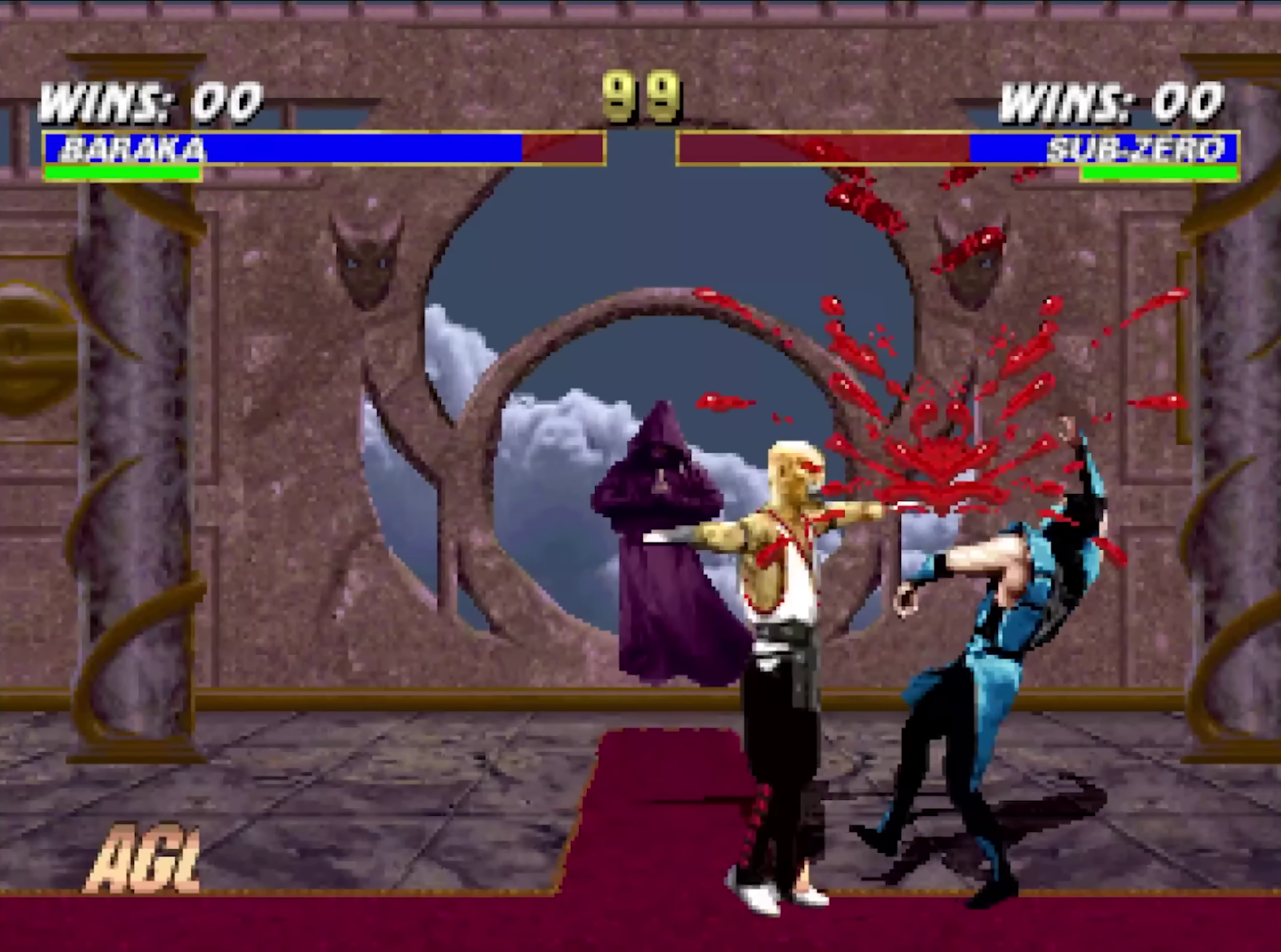
Starting with the US release of Mortal Kombat II, the series became uncensored on Nintendo consoles.

I think a lot of the attention the game got in regards to its violence came from people who never played the game and weren't really aware of the subject matter. They weren't looking at it as a player. They were looking at it as an outside observer who doesn't play the product. Even with games today, if someone who doesn't play a game is shown snippets of a game, their reaction is going to be different than actually sitting down and experiencing the game. If you look at it out of context, it's worse than it actually is.

— Mortal Kombat co-creator John Tobias

As with the first Mortal Kombat game, the extremely bloody content of Mortal Kombat II became the subject of a great deal of controversy regarding violent video games. Mortal Kombat II has been censored in its original release in Japan, where Nintendo insisted on changing the blood shown in the game from red to green, as well as making the screen turn black-and-white for all character-specific lethal Fatality moves. The backlash that Nintendo of America had received for their own similar censorship of the first Mortal Kombat, however, informed the company's future business practices, (Note: As admitted by Nintendo of America's Howard Lincoln, the company "definitely used the Mortal Kombat experience as a learning experience. Instead of getting a lot of letters back from parents raising our position, we got a huge amount of criticism—not only by gamers, but even by parents saying that we had set ourselves up to be censors. [They claimed] that wasn't our job, and that they were offended by that.") and so the sequel and following games in the series were released by them uncensored.

In 2009, Mortal Kombat developer and publisher Midway Games was forced to tone down the Joker's finishing move to secure the ESRB T-rating for Mortal Kombat vs. DC Universe. In 2010, Swiss Social Democrat politician Evi Allemann unsuccessfully campaigned to outlaw Mortal Kombat, Manhunt, and video games displaying interactive "cruel acts of violence" in Switzerland.

The series' 2011 reboot game Mortal Kombat has been banned by law in a number of countries, including entirely in Australia and South Korea, The Australian Minister for Home Affairs, Brendan O'Connor, asked to be briefed on the decision, citing "public disquiet on the issue", and the game was eventually allowed in the country in 2013 when the R18+ rating came into effect.

Due to stated reason of the inconsistency of the game with the local legislations, the previously planned releases of 2019's Mortal Kombat 11 have been canceled in Indonesia, Japan, and Ukraine (in Ukraine because of laws banning Nazi and communist symbols, in Indonesia because of laws regarding communist symbols, not including Axis symbols during World War II). The game is also banned in Mainland China.

==== Germany ====
In Germany, numerous titles in the series were added to the List of Media Harmful to Young People by the Federal Review Board for Media Harmful to Minors between 1994 and 2013 and some titles were even confiscated by the courts.

Games on this list may no longer be offered or sold to minors, and such titles may no longer be publicly advertised. Games that have been confiscated may also no longer be sold to adults.

Game	Added	Confiscated	Removed	Sources
Mortal Kombat (1992)	March 1994	November 1994	March 2020	
Mortal Kombat II	September 1994	February 1995	March 2020	
Mortal Kombat 3	November 1995	June 1997	August 2020	
Ultimate Mortal Kombat 3	August 2000	—	September 2024	
Mortal Kombat Trilogy	February 1997	—	February 2022	
Mortal Kombat 4	July 1998	—	June 2023	
Mortal Kombat Mythologies: Sub-Zero	July 1998	—	June 2023	
Mortal Kombat: Shaolin Monks	April 2007	—	May 2023	
Mortal Kombat: Armageddon	January 2007	—	May 2023	
Mortal Kombat (2011)	May 2011	January 2013	July 2024	

Mortal Kombat X was the first part of the series to receive an 18+ rating from the USK and was therefore allowed to be sold freely.

Since 2020, several titles have been gradually removed from the List of Media Harmful to Young People and the confiscations have been lifted.

On September 27, 2024, Ultimate Mortal Kombat 3, the last remaining title in the Mortal Kombat series, was removed from the List of Media Harmful to Young People.

=== Legislation ===
The Australian Senate had set up an inquiry in response to the original Mortal Kombat, Time Killers, and Night Trap, and the surrounding media coverage; the Senate's inquiry led to the Commonwealth Classification Act, which came into force on March 1, 1995, and introduced the Australian Classification Board. Almost exactly 18 years later, the Board finally banned the 2011 Mortal Kombat game for its "explicit depictions of dismemberment, decapitation, disembowelment and other brutal forms of slaughter." The game's publisher, Warner Bros. Interactive, appealed, but the appeal was rejected. However, following the introduction of an adults-only rating system in 2013, the ban was overturned in Australia and the game re-rated R18+ uncensored.

In 1998, the Florida House of Representatives' Barry Silver sponsored a bill to regulate video game violence, which he stated "[has] affected the moral fiber of our youth." The bill's initial proponents included Florida's Democratic Governor, Lawton Chiles (who alleged that violent video games can become "an instruction manual for murder and mayhem") and Florida State University Professor Murray Krantz, a specialist in child development. Eventually, the bill garnered support from more than 50 lawmakers and various groups ranging from the Florida Parent-Teacher Association to the Christian Coalition of America. After seeing a videotape of gameplay from one of the Mortal Kombat games, (Note: An AP reporter described the tape's content as follows: "After a male warrior repeatedly pummels a female opponent, the game urges him to 'finish her'. He then punches his hand into her chest and rips out her heart as blood gushes to the floor. At other times, the winning warrior instead pulls out the entire spine.") the House Governmental Rules and Regulation Committee passed the bill unanimously. Opponents, such as the Interactive Digital Software Association's founder and president, Doug Lowenstein, regarded the bill as unconstitutional, violating the First Amendment's freedom of speech provision with potentially far-reaching consequences. (Note: Video game magazine Next Generation called the bill "a serious threat to video games in Florida" and expressed concern that the measure "might lead to the removal of all public video games in the state and possibly start a national trend.")

In 2002, U.S. District Judge Stephen N. Limbaugh Sr. decided that video games are not speech at all and thus do not deserve First Amendment protection. Limbaugh based his opinion in part on his review of four games including Mortal Kombat, misnamed in court documents as "Mortal Combat".

In 2005, California passed a statewide ban on selling violent video games to minors, proposed and championed by former Governor of California Arnold Schwarzenegger. However, the ban was eventually struck down by a 7-2 vote in the Supreme Court case Brown v. Entertainment Merchants Association in 2011. The court ruled that "video games qualify for First Amendment protection", making the ban unconstitutional. The justices' majority opinion declared: "Reading Dante is unquestionably more cultured and intellectually edifying than playing Mortal Kombat. But these cultural and intellectual differences are not constitutional ones. Crudely violent video games, tawdry TV shows, and cheap novels and magazines are no less forms of speech than The Divine Comedy, and restrictions upon them must survive strict scrutiny." Justice Elena Kagan was quoted as calling Mortal Kombat "an iconic game, which I am sure half of the clerks who work for us spent considerable amounts of time in their adolescence playing."

=== Advertisement censorship ===
Mortal Kombat's advertisements received criticism as well. In 1993, Senator Lieberman, referencing one of Sega's television commercials for the game, (Note: The video, as described by Weekly Reader, "shows a boy gaining the respect of his friends after winning Mortal Kombat. At the end of the commercial, the boy angrily knocks over a tray of cookies given to him by friends now frightened by the boy's fighting ability. The boy roars, 'I said I wanted chocolate chip!'") argued that the ad itself promoted violence. Some advertisements were subjected to censorship. The 2011 edition of Guinness World Records Gamer's Edition awarded the Mortal Kombat series the world record for the earliest video game poster to be censored: "On April 22, 2003, Britain's Advertising Standards Authority (ASA) took the then unprecedented step of condemning the poster campaign promoting Mortal Kombat: Deadly Alliance." The ASA claimed that the poster, showing a hoodie with a bloodstained hand, was "irresponsible" and "condoned violence"; the poster was removed. Blood on the Carpet, a TV commercial for 2005's Mortal Kombat: Shaolin Monks created by London-based company Maverick Media, (Note: The video, as described by The Register, "features a boardroom scene in which a Mr Linn, the mysterious trouble-shooter at a sales meeting, instructs two men to fight. Punches lead to a pen being stabbed into an arm; then a water jug is smashed over an executive's head – before his heart is ripped from his chest. Mr Linn concludes proceedings by decapitating another executive with his hat.") was also targeted by the ASA as "condoning and glorifying violence".

=== Studies on video game violence ===
- In 2000, psychologists Craig A. Anderson and Karen Dill conducted two related studies on the effects of media violence. The studies involved notably violent games, including Mortal Kombat and Wolfenstein 3D. They concluded that playing such games makes players, especially males, act more aggressively. Following the studies' publication, a year-long "flurry of new scrutiny" was directed at Mortal Kombat by U.S. lawmakers and the media.
- A 2008 experiment by Richard J. Barlett, Christopher P. Harris, and Callie Bruey also examined how playing Mortal Kombat: Deadly Alliance affected subjects' hostility and heart rate. They interpreted their findings as evidence that players exhibited "more aggressive thoughts activated in semantic memory."
- In a 2010 experiment conducted by psychologists Brad Bushman and Bryan Gibson, using Mortal Kombat vs. DC Universe and two other violent games (Resistance: Fall of Man and Resident Evil 5), the authors concluded "that the aggression stimulating effects of a violent video game can persist long after the game has been turned off, if people ruminate about the violent content in the game."
- The following year, Dr. Brock Bastian from the University of Queensland's School of Psychology performed an experiment in which participants played Mortal Kombat, fighting against each other and against artificial intelligence-controlled opponents. The study, published in the Journal of Experimental Social Psychology, claimed to have "found evidence that playing violent video games leads players to see themselves, and their opponents, as lacking in core human qualities such as warmth, open-mindedness, and intelligence." Bastian concluded that "the findings of this study point to the potential long-term effects of violent video game play and suggest that repeated exposure to these dehumanizing experiences may result in chronic changes in self-perception."
- Bruce D. Bartholow, a psychology professor at the University of Missouri, said that there is a fear that this simulated violence can translate into real-life violence as "the extent that a player learns to make specific or violent responses in the context of the game, those same skills could transfer to similar scenarios outside the game, potentially increasing aggression in nongaming situations."

=== Real-life violence ===
In the aftermath of the Columbine High School massacre in 1999, the subjects of DOOM and Mortal Kombat returned to Congressional hearings about the alleged impact on the youth. United States President Bill Clinton stated that "video games like Mortal Kombat, Killer Instinct, and DOOM, the very game played obsessively by the two young men who ended so many lives in Littleton, make our children more active participants in simulated violence." Attorney Jack Thompson, a conservative activist against explicit content in video games and media in general, represented the families of three of the Columbine victims in unsuccessfully trying to sue the producers of DOOM and Mortal Kombat. (Note: In 2006, Thompson also sent a cease and desist letter to Midway Games, writing: "It has today come to my attention that the newly recently [sic] Mortal Kombat: Armageddon contains an unauthorized commercial exploitation of my name, photograph, image, and likeness within the game." Midway did not respond. In fact, what Thompson thought was an official character was in fact the creation of an individual player. That player used the game's "Kreate-a-Fighter" mode to construct a likeness of Thompson and demonstrated it in a video clip posted online. Instructions on how to make a "Jack Thompson" character, described there as "the most violent man in America," were published two days earlier by video game website Gaming Target. Thompson succeeded in having the offending video removed from YouTube, but the article remained online in unaltered form.)

Some critics have alleged that the Mortal Kombat series influenced particular cases of real-life lethal violence other than the Columbine massacre:

- In 1999, Brazil banned Mortal Kombat, Postal, Carmageddon, and four first-person shooter games for allegedly inspiring 24 year-old medical student Mateus da Costa Meira's deadly shooting rampage in São Paulo, which was primarily blamed on Duke Nukem 3D. The ban was later abolished years later with the popularity of the Mortal Kombat series in the country.
- In 2007, 20 year-old Patrick Morris used a shotgun to kill 15 year-old Diego Aguilar in Klamath Falls, Oregon, in what prosecutors alleged was a drug deal-related killing. However, Morris' defense attorney alleged that violent video games such as Mortal Kombat "may have blurred Morris' ability to distinguish reality and the consequences of his actions."
- In 2008, in the so-called "Mortal Kombat murder" case, 17 year-old Lamar Roberts and 16 year-old Heather Trujillo were accused of beating to death Trujillo's seven year-old half-sister, Zoe Garcia. The teenagers told investigators they were acting out moves from a Mortal Kombat game. At a preliminary hearing, prosecutor Robert Miller stated: "Zoe Garcia was the object of abuse by both Heather Trujillo and Lamar Roberts caused these injuries with Mortal Kombat [sic]." Roberts and Trujillo were convicted of murder. The victim's parents said they were convinced the Mortal Kombat story was fabricated by the killers.
- In the aftermath of the 2012 Sandy Hook Elementary School shooting, Wayne LaPierre, Executive Vice President of the National Rifle Association (NRA), named four violent video games, including Mortal Kombat, (Note: In his statement, LaPierre said: "Guns don't kill people. Video games, the media and Obama's budget kill people. ... And here's another dirty little truth that the media try their best to conceal: There exists in this country a callous, corrupt and corrupting shadow industry that sells, and sows, violence against its own people. Through vicious, violent video games with names like Bulletstorm, Grand Theft Auto, Mortal Kombat and Splatterhouse.") as contributors to the increased incidence of killing sprees in the United States. Many commentators regarded LaPierre's choice of Mortal Kombat as an odd and outdated pop culture reference.
- In 2015, CNN's Ashleigh Banfield described the Charleston church shooting as "Mortal Kombat murders".

=== Feminist and racial perspectives ===
Some critics have condemned the Mortal Kombat series as sexist or racist, especially regarding its Asian characters. Guy Aoki, the president of the advocacy group Media Action Network for Asian Americans, rebuked Mortal Kombat II in 1994 for allegedly perpetuating existing stereotypes of Asians as martial arts experts, with the game's portrayal of characters such as Kung Lao, Liu Kang, Raiden, Scorpion, Shang Tsung, and Sub-Zero. Allyne Mills, publicist for the game's publisher Acclaim Entertainment, answered: "This is a fantasy game, with all different characters. This is a martial arts game which comes from Asia. The game was not created to foster stereotypes." The characters' racial diversity and the inclusion of female characters were also criticized by the psychologists Patricia Marks Greenfield and Rodney R. Cocking in their 1996 book Interacting with Video, writing they "cannot assume that this greater diversity represents a more progressive identity politics, for one could argue that it merely increases the racist and sexist potential of the individual fights." In 1995, critical studies professor Marsha Kinder denounced Mortal Kombat II and Mortal Kombat 3 for allegedly allowing players to have what she termed "a misogynist aspect to the combat." (Note: Kinder was quoted as saying that in Mortal Kombat II, "some of the most violent possibilities are against women. Also, their fatality moves are highly eroticised. One of the women characters kills her opponent by inflating him until he explodes, another by sucking him in and spitting out his bones. Talk about Spider Woman!") In a 1999 book titled From Barbie to Mortal Kombat, written by media scholars Justine Cassell and Henry Jenkins, the series was used to represent "the basic boy cyberworld of aggression, action and dead bodies." Critics alleging the Mortal Kombat series being sexist and incompatible with women included liberal journalist Ellen Goodman, (Note: While reporting on Cassell and Jenkins' book, Goodman commented: "Much as we want little girls in the computer circle, it's hard to lament the fact that our daughters are not drawn to Kombat bootstraps." In another 1999 article, Goodman also mentioned the game negatively by writing that while "you're worrying about violence and gratitious sex" and "may want to get Mortal Kombat off your computer," the "folks on your right" are "worrying about [issues such as] keeping the sexes in their designated roles," when arguing that left-wingers should not join up with conservatives into a common "anti-entertainment, anti-Hollywood brigade and assume that we are all singing the same key.") among others. (Note: For example, in a 2011 review of Mortal Kombat 9, Maddy Myers of The Boston Phoenix wrote "Mortal Kombat represents everything that's awful about video games. It's trashy, it's corny, it's gory, it's sexist, it's racist ... The entire game is an alienating reminder that if you're not a white, heterosexual male, it's not 'for' you. Or perhaps the intended message is, 'Violence is sexy'?")

On the other hand, U.S. Appeals Court Judge Richard Posner considered Ultimate Mortal Kombat 3 to be "a feminist violent video game". Finding that Indianapolis' attempt to ban Ultimate Mortal Kombat 3 violated the First Amendment, Judge Posner wrote "the game is feminist in depicting a woman as fully capable of holding her own in violent combat with heavily armed men. It thus has a message, even an 'ideology' just as books and movies do." Judge Posner further marveled that "the woman wins all the duels. She is as strong as the men, she is more skillful, more determined, and she does not flinch at the sight of blood."

=== Harm to game developers ===
In 2019, a developer of Mortal Kombat 11 was diagnosed with post-traumatic stress disorder (PTSD) after spending a long time working with the violent visuals used in the video game and reference material used to create the visuals, reportedly avoiding sleep due to violent dreams. They alleged that coworkers who worked on the animation experienced similar discomfort, and criticized the development company for lacking formal process, standard procedure, or guidance available for workers who needed to step back from the violent content, or felt such work had begun to negatively affect them.

The studio was also accused of instituting "crunch culture", with employees regularly working 80 to 100 hours a week to meet submission deadlines, contractors working overtime due to inadequate wages, and delayed communication between the development and testing departments.

== Court cases ==
=== Daniel Pesina v. Midway Manufacturing Co. ===
In 1996, actor Daniel Pesina (who had portrayed Johnny Cage, Sub-Zero, Scorpion, Reptile, Smoke and Noob Saibot in the first two games) sued Midway Games, Williams Electronics Games, Acclaim Entertainment, Nintendo, and Sega. He alleged "that all defendants used his persona, name, and likeness without authorization in the home version of Mortal Kombat and Mortal Kombat II and the related products." The case was tried in the United States District Court for the Northern District of Illinois with Judge Elaine E. Bucklo presiding. The court concluded that "alleged use of martial artist's name, likeness or persona in a martial arts video game did not violate his common-law right of publicity."

=== Philip Ahn, Elizabeth Malecki, and Katalin Zamiar v. Midway Manufacturing, et al. ===
In 1997, Mortal Kombat and Mortal Kombat II actors Philip Ahn (Shang Tsung), Elizabeth Malecki (Sonya Blade), and Katalin Zamiar (Kitana, Mileena, and Jade) jointly sued Midway Games, Williams Electronics Games, Acclaim, Nintendo and Sega for using their likenesses in an unauthorized way. They sought "a constructive trust on all monies defendants received and continued to receive from their alleged breach of their duties to [the] plaintiffs." Ahn, Zamiar, and Malecki alleged "that they were only modeling for the coin-operated video game, not the subsequent home video, home computer, and hand-held versions of the game." With Judge Robert William Gettleman presiding in the Northern District of Illinois court "the plaintiffs lost on all counts because they had all consented to the videotaping and because the choreography and choice of movements used in the game were not jointly 'authored' by the individuals."

=== Wilson v. Midway Games, Inc. ===
In 1997, thirteen-year-old Noah Wilson was killed by Yancy Salazar, also thirteen. Salazar stabbed Wilson in the chest with a kitchen knife and severed his aorta, leaving Wilson to die after an hour of massive blood loss. The victim's mother, Andrea Wilson, alleged that her son was killed due to Salazar's strong interest in Mortal Kombat. She claimed that Salazar was so "obsessed" with the game that he thought he was actually the Mortal Kombat character Cyrax, who she claimed used a Fatality in which he grabs the opponent in a headlock and stabs his opponent in the chest. In fact, this Fatality did not exist and was never performed by the character Cyrax. With Judge Janet Bond Arterton presiding, the case was tried in the United States District Court for the District of Connecticut. The court ruled that "Wilson's complaint failed to state a claim upon which relief can be granted."

=== Royalties lawsuits related to Time Warner's 2009 acquisition of Midway assets ===
In 2009, Lawrence Kasanoff, producer of the Mortal Kombat films, TV series, soundtracks, and live tour, and his company, Threshold Entertainment, sued Midway in bankruptcy court over what he claimed were his own intellectual property (IP) parts of the franchise. (Note: Kasanoff's complaint stated: "The Mortal Kombat series, as it stands today, is far more a creation of Threshold and Kasanoff than of Midway. Midway's creative input was almost entirely limited to the videogames. On their own, the video games provided only minimal backstory and mythology, and only flat, 'stock' characters. ... Kasanoff and Threshold were responsible for virtually all of the creative input that went into turning the videogame concept into a multimedia enterprise.") Trying to preserve copyrights to certain Mortal Kombat characters and to retain the right to create derivative film and television projects based on the franchise, Kasanoff attempted to block a $33-million bid for Mortal Kombat assets by Time Warner, whose New Line Cinema developed the 1990s film adaptations of the games. Two other lawsuits related to millions of dollars of unpaid royalties were filed during the periods of 2000-2004 and 2005-2008. In 2011, Los Angeles County Superior Court Judge Ronald M. Sohigian awarded Kasanoff only $14,981 and dismissed his other claims. He also ordered Threshold to pay Time Warner, Inc. $25,412 in legal fees after determining that Time Warner, Inc. was the "prevailing party". Kasanoff appealed the ruling and the denial of a jury trial.
