= Mortal Kombat Gold =

1999 video game

- North American cover art
- Developer: Eurocom
- Publisher: Midway Home Entertainment
- Director: Ed Boon
- Series: Mortal Kombat
- Platform: Dreamcast
- Release: NA: September 9, 1999; UK: October 29, 1999
- Genre: Fighting
- Modes: Single-player, multiplayer

Mortal Kombat Gold is a 1999 fighting game for the Dreamcast, developed by Eurocom and published by Midway Home Entertainment, released in North America on September 9, 1999 as a launch title for the console, and in October in Europe. It is an updated version of 1997's Mortal Kombat 4, and was the first Mortal Kombat game to appear on a sixth-generation platform, as well as the only game in the series to be released for the Dreamcast. Critical reaction was mostly average due to the graphics being inferior to the arcade version, the weapons deemed boring or useless, the middling voice acting, and game-breaking bugs and glitches.

== Gameplay ==
Mortal Kombat Gold's gameplay is largely based on Mortal Kombat 4 and includes several additional characters and stages not seen in Mortal Kombat 4, as well as a new weapon selection mechanism. New stages include Church, Ladder, Netherrealm, and Soul Chamber.

== Characters ==
Kung Lao fighting against Baraka in the Soul Chamber arena

Mortal Kombat Gold features the same character roster as Mortal Kombat 4, which includes Liu Kang, Jax Briggs, Sonya Blade, Johnny Cage, Sub-Zero, Reiko, Jarek, Raiden, Tanya, Scorpion, Kai, Reptile, Fujin, Shinnok, Quan Chi, sub-boss Goro, and the secret characters Noob Saibot and Meat. In addition, Gold also features six additional characters, Kitana, Mileena, Cyrax, Kung Lao, Baraka and a secret character Sektor, who were not featured in any version of Mortal Kombat 4 but had been featured in previous installments of the franchise.

Although the game's storyline is much identical to that of Mortal Kombat 4, the official strategy guide for the game misprinted unused bios for the six new returning characters, causing some confusion among fans.

In June 1999, Game Informer published screenshots of an unfinished character named Belokk, who was being developed for Mortal Kombat Gold. In an interview with GameSpot, Eurocom expressed surprise that information about the character had become public, explaining that his inclusion depended on completing further development work and obtaining approval from Midway's arcade development team. Eurocom subsequently confirmed that Belokk would not appear in the finished game.

== Development ==
The game was showcased at E3 1999.

During development, British studio Eurocom worked closely with Midway's Mortal Kombat development team in Chicago. John Tobias provided concept artwork for the returning characters, while Dave Michicich reviewed and refined their models and textures. Ed Boon supplied source code and technical notes to assist with the conversion. Eurocom aimed to preserve the arcade version's polygonal character models while introducing higher-resolution graphics and additional lighting effects on the Dreamcast.

In a September 1999 hands-on preview, American magazine GamePro praised the game's graphics and reported that the developers were planning additional moves and Fatalities for certain characters. However, the magazine noted that the preview build still required improvements to its collision detection and frame rate.

== Release ==
About a month after the initial launch, a revised version of the game was released, which intended to address some of its most severe issues. This version fixed the most severe bugs and glitches in the game and added VMU memory card support, which allowed the save feature to function properly. This version was released on a red tinted disc, as opposed to the original's gold tint, and was easily identified by a green "Hot! New!" logo on the instruction manual's cover.

== Reception ==
Reception

Aggregate score
Aggregator	Score
GameRankings	55%

Review scores
Publication	Score
GameRevolution	D
GameSpot	5/10
IGN	6.3/10
Next Generation	2/5

Mortal Kombat Gold received an averaged review score of only 55% at GameRankings. Despite having the graphics that were the most faithful to the arcade version of all the home versions of Mortal Kombat 4, Game Revolution rated it a D and commented that "the graphics are inexcusably horrible" and "it's quite a depressing let-down on Sega's 128-bit masterpiece, especially when compared to Soulcalibur." The weapons that characters can use during the game were called "dull and uninteresting", often having little relation to the characters, and being "either a sword, axe, or club". IGN was less negative toward the game, awarding it a 6.3 out of 10, but was particularly critical regarding the weapon system: "Readying your weapon is a slow process in which one can be hit any number of times during the attempt". Although IGN commented on the improvements from previous Mortal Kombat games, the lack of depth was considered inexcusable. Jeff Gerstmann of GameSpot, who gave the game a score of 5.0/10, wrote that "sitting down and playing MK Gold almost feels like a retrogaming experience - you really feel as though you've pulled out some old game that you haven't played in years - and it hasn't aged gracefully." According to a retrospective by IGN, "the same publications that had once praised it on Nintendo 64 were happy to thrash it as a shallow and campy relic of a past age. Releasing beside Soulcalibur certainly didn't help."

Jeff Lundrigan reviewed the Dreamcast version of the game for Next Generation, rating it two stars out of five, and stated that "Mortal Kombat Gold goes a long way towards confirming that this series peaked with MK2, and it's been in steady decline ever since."

European reviews were similarly mixed. British magazine Official Dreamcast Magazine awarded Mortal Kombat Gold 5 out of 10, with Stuart Dredge describing its gameplay and presentation as outdated compared with contemporary fighting games such as Soulcalibur, Virtua Fighter and Street Fighter. Although he acknowledged its accessibility and additional characters, he criticised the limited variety of finishing moves and its lack of lasting appeal. French magazine Consoles + gave the game 35%, arguing that the series had lost much of its original shock value and criticising its repetitive animations, limited innovation and rigid gameplay.

Italian magazine Console Mania offered a considerably more positive assessment, awarding the game 83 out of 100. Reviewer Davide Pessach praised its gameplay, sound and variety of options, although he acknowledged that its graphics appeared dated compared to other Dreamcast fighting games, particularly Soulcalibur. Conversely, Spain's Revista Oficial Dreamcast awarded it 4 out of 10, considering the game technologically outdated and offering little beyond the formula established by earlier entries in the series.

Conversely, Brazilian magazine SuperGamePower gave the game 4.5 out 5, regarding the graphics as superior to anything came up by Ed Boon and John Tobias on console or arcade. The magazine also recommends the game to fight fans, particularly those who favor the Mortal Kombat series.

Mortal Kombat Gold was the second best-selling Dreamcast game in Brazil, behind NBA 2k.
