= War Gods (video game) =

1997 video game

- Arcade flyer
- Developer: Midway (Note: Ports developed by Eurocom Entertainment Software.)
- Publishers: Midway; Windows; GT Interactive
- Director: Joe Linhoff
- Composer: Vincent Pontarelli
- Platforms: Arcade, PlayStation, Nintendo 64, Windows
- Release: August 1996: Arcade; NA: August 1996 PlayStation; NA: June 20, 1997; EU: October 1997 Nintendo 64; NA: May 20, 1997; EU: November 28, 1997 Windows; NA: June 19, 1997
- Genre: Fighting
- Modes: Single-player, multiplayer
- Arcade system: Midway V Unit

War Gods is a 1996 fighting video game developed and published by Midway for arcades. Ports for the Nintendo 64, PlayStation and Windows were released in 1997. Players control one of ten fighters who have been given great power by a mysterious ore that crashed-landed on Earth from outer space. The object of the game is to defeat all the other fighters to become the most powerful warrior on the planet.

The game was heavily influenced by Midway's Mortal Kombat series, and features controls similar to that series, as well as its signature fatalities. Unique to War Gods is the "3D" button, allowing players to use the background/foreground for additional attacks and evasive maneuvers; in other words it lets the player dive around the ring in a circular arc as part of their attacks and defensive moves. The orbiting camera smoothly follows the fighters, working to maintain the left/right "fighting line" needed for coherent two-player joystick control on the arcade cabinet. The game's graphics were created using a technology by Midway called "digital skin", which mapped photographs onto 3D models.

War Gods received mixed reviews, with particular criticism being directed at the game's character design and animations.

== Gameplay ==
War Gods' character design and graphics were criticized by reviewers.

War Gods is a 3D fighting game with the control scheme of a Mortal Kombat or Street Fighter entry. It is limited to a story mode that can be played alone or two-player; in the Nintendo 64 version, the two-player mode is activated by having the second controller plugged in while on the character selection screen. The plot begins billions of years ago, when a spaceship carrying a valuable ore crashes into Earth. Over the years, ten humans find pieces of the ore and turn into the titular powerful beings. The evil gods fight to possess all the pieces and become the ultimate super-warriors, while the good gods fight to stop Exor and save the planet. The final battles are with two aliens from the spaceship, Grox and Exor, hunting the War Gods for a missing transporter. The levels are set in areas native to the War Gods, such as the Warhead's military base, Anubis's desert pyramid, Ahau Kim's ancient aztec temple, Pagan abandoned ghotic church, Voodoo's Bayou forest and Kabuki Jo's Samurai temple.

The game plays similarly to Mortal Kombat 4, using an almost identical button layout of high/low punches and kicks. The "Run" button was replaced with a "3D" button that, when held down while using other joystick and button combinations, allows the player to perform different attacks/evasions utilizing the background or foreground. To prevent situations where opponents end up on different playing fields for prolonged periods of time, each character has a teleport move which moves them close to their opponent. Just as in the Mortal Kombat games, players select a character and fight a series of opponents. War Gods also features combos which can be used through series of button presses. Like the Mortal Kombat games, the game has fatalities that are used to finish off opponents, aside from one Fatality per character the game also has other three types of finishing moves such as 10 Hit Combos for each character and By Pressing High Kick with the 3D button the players are able to perform a Stage Ring out finishing move and by pressing Uppercut they can punch the opponents high in the Sky.

== Development ==
Released by Midway as the first of its new 3D software prior to the release of Mortal Kombat 4, War Gods was developed by a team led by Joe Linhoff and George Petro. The arcade game utilized a hybrid of the hardware used for Cruis'n USA with a hard drive for data storage. All the moves were recorded using motion capture with just two actors. The in-game characters were created using a technology called "digital skin", which involved digitizing reference photographs of live actors and mapping them onto 3-D models.

Gamefan reported about War Gods in August 1995 claiming it will use the same hardware as Killer Instinct and will be unveiled at Amusement Expo International in September 1995. However War Gods did not get unveiled until at a trade show in March 1996. In response to suggestions and complaints about the gameplay, several months were devoted to refining the game's programming, delaying the arcade release to the third quarter of 1996.

The Nintendo 64 version was delayed in order to tone down the difficulty level and add additional moves. A Panasonic M2 version of War Gods was in development and slated to be one of its launch titles, but it never happened due to the system's cancellation.

== Reception ==
Reception

Aggregate score
Aggregator	Score
GameRankings	45.32% (N64); 50.50%(Playstation)

Review scores
Publication	Score
Electronic Gaming Monthly	6/10, 4.5/10, 5.5/10, 5/10 (N64)
EP Daily	3.5/10 (N64)
GameFan	70/100, 66/100, 68/100
GameRevolution	D+ (N64)
GameSpot	6.1/10 (N64)
Génération 4	2/6
IGN	4.3/10 (N64); 4/10 (PS1)
N64 Magazine	46% (N64)
Next Generation	2/5 (ARC); 1/5 (N64)
PC Zone	5.3/10 (WIN)
64	59% (N64)

The response to War Gods was lukewarm. Critics from GameFan and IGN felt the N64 port improved on the problems of the arcade port, such as the AI and frame rate, although the former source expressed that it was a waste of resources to do so. One of the biggest criticisms the game received was for its cast of characters. Computer and Video Games reported that while the arcade game was being exhibited at the 1996 American Coin Machine Exposition, showgoers believed that the character designs would hurt the game's chances for success. Matt Casamassina of IGN called the character designs "uninspired", while a reviewer for Next Generation called them "mildly embarrassing Ringling Brothers' character design". Game Revolution, however, said the character designs were "pretty cool" and complimented the variety in the available fighters.

The response to the game's graphics was mixed. Computer and Video Games had a positive impression of the in-game models with "digital skin". Next Generation said the digital skin technique is genuinely innovative and different, but the result is characters which look jagged, move stiffly, and generally lack the smoothness of the polygonal fighters seen in contemporary games like Tekken 2 and Virtua Fighter 2. Commenting on the Nintendo 64 version, Jeff Gerstmann of GameSpot called it "probably the first N64 fighting game to hit the market that actually shows off some of the power of this system." However, most reviewers said the game makes poor use of the N64 hardware, citing choppy character animations, a low frame rate, poorly detailed characters, and slowdown. Casamassina wrote that the while the digital skin textures were "initially nice", the "animation and terrible character design detract greatly from the whole experience."

IGN said they were "pleased with the control in the game, but not overly excited by it." GamePro remarked that "The 3D button, while innovative, really doesn't enhance the gameplay" and is too easily confused with low guard on the N64 controller. Reviewers, such as E. Storm of GameFan who found the controls not responsive enough to compete with fighters of such "insane" AI, also commented that the game's controls were ill-suited for the N64 controller. Only Next Generation argued that the controls are more intuitive with the N64 controller than they were in the arcade. The Nintendo 64 version was also criticized for having imbalanced A.I., Casamassina writing fighters would successfully pull off every attack without struggle on the easiest setting. Reviewers highlighted the fact that the game plays very similarly to the Mortal Kombat games. Gerstmann commented that there was "just enough of the MK feel to give it familiarity" calling it "an interesting footnote to the MK legacy." After seeing the game demoed at the American Coin Machine Exposition, a Next Generation writer said it was "the next step forward for Midway's Mortal Kombat series (though it's not technically Mortal Kombat)." The magazine's later review of the game, however, criticized that too many of the fighters' moves are obvious parallels to moves seen in the Mortal Kombat series. Sushi-X of Electronic Gaming Monthly (EGM) likewise judged that the overt similarity to Mortal Kombat makes the game "horribly unoriginal." EGM named it the 1997 "Game That Should've Stayed in the Arcades" in their 1998 Video Game Buyer's Guide, commenting that "an average arcade game doesn't make for a great home game, War Gods is no exception."

Next Generation and Crispin Boyer of EGM noted that the Nintendo 64 version was actually enhanced over the arcade version, with faster gameplay, better anti-aliasing, and bosses which were tuned to present a more reasonable challenge, but both felt these enhancements were not enough to make the game good. GamePro assessed that the game compared unfavorably, not only to the top tier fighting games on the Saturn and PlayStation, but even to middling N64 fighters such as Killer Instinct Gold and Mortal Kombat Trilogy.

War Gods flopped in arcades, owing chiefly to limited distribution and unfavorable word of mouth.

== See also ==
- Bio F.R.E.A.K.S.
- Mace: The Dark Age
- Mortal Kombat 4
