= Mortal Kombat =

Video game series and multimedia franchise

- Official franchise logo
- Genres: Fighting; Action-adventure
- Developers: Midway Games: Avalanche Software; Eurocom; Just Games Interactive; Midway Studios Los Angeles; Other Ocean Interactive; Point of View; NetherRealm Studios
- Publishers: Midway Games; Williams Entertainment; Warner Bros. Games
- Creators: Ed Boon; John Tobias
- Platform: List: Amiga Android Arcade Game.com iOS Windows MS-DOS Super NES Nintendo 64 GameCube Wii Nintendo Switch Nintendo Switch 2 Game Boy Game Boy Color Game Boy Advance Nintendo DS PlayStation PlayStation 2 PlayStation 3 PlayStation 4 PlayStation 5 PlayStation Portable PlayStation Vita R-Zone J2ME Master System Sega Genesis Sega CD Genesis 32X Sega Saturn Dreamcast Game Gear Stadia TV game Xbox Xbox 360 Xbox One Xbox Series X/S
- First release: Mortal Kombat; August 1992
- Latest release: Mortal Kombat: Legacy Kollection; October 30, 2025

Mortal Kombat is an American media franchise centered on a series of fighting video games originally developed by Midway Games in 1992.

The original Mortal Kombat arcade game spawned a franchise consisting of action-adventure games, a comic book series, a card game, film series, an animated TV series, and a live-action tour. Mortal Kombat has become the best-selling fighting game franchise worldwide with over 100 million copies and one of the highest-grossing media franchises of all time.

The series has a reputation for high levels of graphic violence, including, most notably, its fatalities, which are finishing moves that kill defeated opponents instead of knocking them out. Controversies surrounding Mortal Kombat, in part, led to the creation of the Entertainment Software Rating Board (ESRB) video game rating system. Early games in the series were noted for their realistic digitized sprites and an extensive use of palette swapping to create new characters. Following Midway's bankruptcy, the Mortal Kombat development team was acquired by Warner Bros. Entertainment and re-established as NetherRealm Studios.

== Gameplay ==
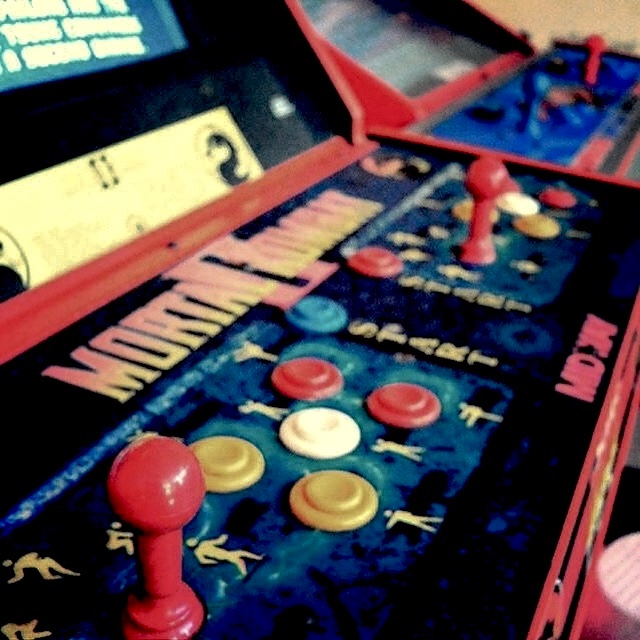
Mortal Kombat II arcade cabinet's control board

The original three games and their updates, Mortal Kombat (1992), Mortal Kombat II (1993), Mortal Kombat 3 (1995), Ultimate Mortal Kombat 3 (1995), and Mortal Kombat Trilogy (1996), are 2D fighting games. The arcade cabinet versions of the first two used a joystick and five buttons: high punch, low punch, high kick, low kick, and block; Mortal Kombat 3 and its updates added a sixth "run" button. Characters in the early Mortal Kombat games play virtually identically to one another, with the only major differences being their special moves. Through the 1990s, the developer and publisher Midway Games kept their single-styled fighting moves with four attack buttons for a different array of punches, kicks and blocks. Mortal Kombat 4 was the first Mortal Kombat game in which the characters could move in three dimensions and the first to use 3D computer graphics. From Deadly Alliance to Mortal Kombat: Deception, characters had three fighting styles per character: two unarmed styles, and one weapon style. While most of the styles used in the series are based on real martial arts, some are fictitious. Goro's fighting styles, for example, are designed to take advantage of the fact that he has four arms. For Armageddon, fighting styles were reduced to a maximum of two per character (generally one hand-to-hand combat style and one weapon style) due to the sheer number of playable characters. Mortal Kombat vs. DC Universe dropped multiple fighting styles for most characters in favor of giving each character a wider variety of special moves 2011's Mortal Kombat returned to a single 2D fighting plane, although characters are rendered in 3D. Unlike previous Mortal Kombat games, the controller's four attack buttons correspond to one of the character's limbs, the buttons thus becoming front punch, back punch, front kick and back kick ("front" indicates the limb that is closer to the opponent, and "back" indicates the limb that is farther away from the opponent).

Mortal Kombat: Deception and Mortal Kombat: Armageddon feature "Konquest", a free-roaming action-adventure mode. Both games include distinct minigame modes such as "Chess Kombat", an action-strategy game. Two other bonus minigames, "Puzzle Kombat" inspired by Puzzle Fighter and "Motor Kombat" inspired by Mario Kart, feature super deformed versions of Mortal Kombat characters. The games contain various unlockable content and hidden cheats.

=== Finishing moves ===
Kung Lao's "Razor's Edge" Fatality being performed on Mileena in 2011's Mortal Kombat. NetherRealm Studios' Ed Boon described it as possibly the most painful-looking finishing move in the series yet.

I think [Mortal Kombat] represents the difference in philosophy. [....] So in Street Fighter when you're playing it's the moment to moment gameplay that should be the best, whether you win or lose doesn't really matter. Whereas in Mortal Kombat the fighting and playing is just a pathway to get to the result – it's the Fatality you want to see and you almost want to skip the fighting bit and get to the Fatality because that is the result.

— Street Fighter producer Yoshinori Ono

One of the most notable features of the Mortal Kombat series is its brutal and gruesome finishing moves, known as Fatalities. The basic Fatalities are finishing moves that allow the victorious characters to end a match by murdering their defeated, defenseless opponent. Usually Fatalities are exclusive to each character, the exception being Mortal Kombat: Armageddon, which instead features Kreate-A-Fatality, a feature that allows players to perform their own Fatalities by conducting a series of violent moves chosen from a pool that is common to all characters.

Other finishing moves in the various Mortal Kombat games include Animalities (introduced in Mortal Kombat 3), in which the victor turns into an animal to violently finish off the opponent; Brutality (introduced in Ultimate Mortal Kombat 3) which consists of bashing the opponent into pieces with a long combo of hits; and Stage Fatalities/Death Traps (introduced in the original Mortal Kombat Pit Stage where the victor can uppercut their opponent off of the platform into a bed of spikes below, later made more difficult in Mortal Kombat II by requiring a character-specific button sequence) utilizing parts of certain stages to execute a lethal finishing move (such as a pool of acid). Mortal Kombat: Deception added the Hara-Kiri, a move that allows the loser to perform a suicidal finishing move, giving way to a potential race between both players to see if the winner can finish off their opponent before they can kill themselves.

There are two non-violent finishing moves in the series, which were introduced in Mortal Kombat II as a satire to controversies surrounding Mortal Kombat: Friendship moves, which result in a display of friendship towards the enemy instead of slaughter, and Babalities, which turn the opponent into a baby.

== Plot ==
Mortal Kombat story chronology
Original continuity
- Mortal Kombat: Special Forces
- Mortal Kombat Mythologies: Sub-Zero
- Mortal Kombat
- Mortal Kombat II
- Mortal Kombat 3
- Mortal Kombat 4
- Mortal Kombat: Deadly Alliance
- Mortal Kombat: Deception
- Mortal Kombat: Armageddon
Crossover continuity
- Mortal Kombat vs. DC Universe
Reboot continuity
- Mortal Kombat
- Mortal Kombat X
- Mortal Kombat 11
Second reboot continuity
- Mortal Kombat 1
Shaolin Monks continuity
- Mortal Kombat: Shaolin Monks
Onslaught continuity
- Mortal Kombat: Onslaught

The series takes place in a fictional universe consisting of numerous realms which, according to in-game backstories, were created by the Elder Gods, an ancient, ethereal pantheon of almighty, eternal preternatural beings. The Mortal Kombat: Deception manual described six of the realms as: "Earthrealm, home to such legendary heroes as Liu Kang, Kung Lao, Sonya Blade, Johnny Cage, and Jax, and under the protection of the Thunder God Raiden; Netherrealm, the fiery depths of which are inhospitable to all but the most vile, a realm of demons and shadowy warriors such as Quan Chi and Noob Saibot; Outworld, a realm of constant strife which Emperor Shao Kahn claims as his own; Seido, the Realm of Order, whose inhabitants prize structure and order above all else; the Chaos Realm, whose inhabitants do not abide by any rules whatsoever, and where constant turmoil and change are worshipped; and Edenia, which is known for its beauty, artistic expression, and the longevity of its inhabitants." The Elder Gods decreed that the denizens of one realm could only conquer another realm by defeating the defending realm's greatest warriors in ten consecutive martial arts tournaments, called Mortal Kombat.

The first Mortal Kombat game takes place in Earthrealm (Earth) where seven different warriors with their own reasons for entering join the tournament with the prize being the continued freedom of their realm under threat of a takeover by Outworld. Among the established warriors were Liu Kang, Johnny Cage, and Sonya Blade. With the help of the thunder god Raiden, the Earthrealm warriors were victorious, and Liu Kang became the new champion of Mortal Kombat. In Mortal Kombat II, unable to deal with his minion Shang Tsung's failure, Outworld Emperor Shao Kahn lures the Earthrealm warriors to Outworld for a do-over, winner-take-all tournament, where Liu Kang eventually defeats Shao Kahn. By the time of Mortal Kombat 3, Shao Kahn merged Edenia with his empire and revived its former queen Sindel in Earthrealm, combining it with Outworld as well. He attempts to invade Earthrealm, but is ultimately defeated by Liu Kang once more. After the Kahn's defeat, Edenia was freed from his grasp and returned to a peaceful realm, ruled by Princess Kitana. The following game, Mortal Kombat 4, features the fallen elder god Shinnok attempting to conquer the realms and kill Raiden. He is defeated by Liu Kang.

In Mortal Kombat: Deadly Alliance, the evil sorcerers Quan Chi and Shang Tsung join forces to conquer the realms, killing series protagonist Liu Kang in the process. By Mortal Kombat: Deception, after several fights, the sorcerers emerge victorious, having killed most of Earthrealm's warriors until Raiden steps forth to oppose them. The Dragon King Onaga, former ruler of Outworld, returned to merge all realms back together, but was eventually defeated by the game's protagonist, Shujinko.

In Mortal Kombat: Armageddon, the titular catastrophe begins. Centuries before the first Mortal Kombat, Queen Delia foretold the realms would be destroyed because the power of all of the realms' warriors would rise to such greatness that it would overwhelm and destabilize the realms, triggering a destructive chain of events. King Argus had his sons, Taven and Daegon, put into incubation so one day they can be awakened to save the realms from Armageddon by defeating a firespawn known as Blaze. In the end, Shao Kahn is the one who defeats Blaze and wins the war, causing Armageddon.

The crossover Mortal Kombat vs. DC Universe does not share continuity with the other games. After the simultaneous defeats of both Shao Kahn and the alien warlord Darkseid in the DC Universe causes both villains to fuse into the entity "Dark Kahn", both the Mortal Kombat and DC Universes begin to merge. This brings the warriors and heroes into conflicts after suffering bouts of uncontrollable rage. The heroes and villains of both universes repeatedly battle each other, believing each other to be responsible for the catastrophe, until only Raiden and Superman remain. The two confront Dark Kahn and team up to defeat their common foe. After Dark Kahn's defeat, the two realms defuse, with Shao Kahn and Darkseid trapped in each other's universes to face eternal imprisonment.

In the 2011 Mortal Kombat soft reboot, the battle of Armageddon culminated in only two survivors: Shao Kahn and Raiden. On the verge of death by the former's hand, the latter sent visions to his past self in a last-ditch attempt to prevent this outcome. Upon receiving the visions, the past Raiden attempts to alter the timeline to avert Armageddon amidst the tenth Mortal Kombat tournament, during the original game. His attempts to alter history mean that events play out differently to the original series. While he succeeds in preventing Shao Kahn's victory with help from the Elder Gods, he accidentally kills Liu Kang in self-defense and loses most of his allies to Queen Sindel, leaving Earthrealm vulnerable to Shinnok and Quan Chi's machinations.

Mortal Kombat X sees Shinnok and Quan Chi enacting their plan, leading an army of undead revenants of those that were killed in Shao Kahn's invasion of Earthrealm. A team of warriors led by Raiden, Johnny Cage, Kenshi Takahashi, and Sonya Blade oppose them, and in the ensuing battle, Shinnok is imprisoned within his amulet and various warriors are resurrected and freed from his control, though Quan Chi escapes. Twenty-five years later, the sorcerer resurfaces alongside the insectoid D'Vorah to facilitate Shinnok's return. A vengeful Scorpion kills Quan Chi but fails to stop him from freeing Shinnok. To combat him, Cassie Cage, daughter of Johnny Cage and Sonya Blade, leads a team composed of the next generation of Earthrealm's heroes in defeating him. With Shinnok and Quan Chi defeated, Liu Kang and Kitana's revenants assume control of the Netherrealm while Raiden taps into Shinnok's amulet.

Mortal Kombat 11 and its expansion, Aftermath, sees the architect of time and Shinnok's mother, Kronika (the Keeper of Time of that specific timeline) working to alter the timeline following her son's defeat and Raiden's tampering with her work. In doing so, she brings past versions of the realm's heroes to the present, aligning herself with some while the rest work to defeat her. After nearly killing Liu Kang a second time, Raiden discovers Kronika has manipulated them into fighting across multiple timelines as she fears their combined power. Despite her interference and attacks by her minions, Raiden gives Liu Kang his power, turning him into a god of fire and thunder so he can defeat Kronika. In the Aftermath expansion, it is revealed that Liu Kang inadvertently destroyed Kronika's crown, the item needed to restart the timeline. Her defeat also revives Shang Tsung, who was absent in the base game due to his imprisonment by Kronika. To recover the crown, Liu Kang sends Shang Tsung and other Earthrealm heroes back in time to obtain it before Kronika, though Shang Tsung manipulates events so that he comes into possession of the crown. At the end, either Liu Kang or Shang Tsung becomes the Keeper of Time, depending on the player's choice (who they want to fight with in the final battle) and the outcome of the battle.

Mortal Kombat 1, the second reboot on the series' timeline, sees Lord Liu Kang has created his New Era and strives to maintain peace between all the realms. However, his plans begin to unravel when Shang Tsung and Quan Chi, despite his attempts to have them de-powered and unable to cause trouble, ally with General Shao in order to conquer Earthrealm and Outworld. Investigating the matter, Liu Kang discovers that the Shang Tsung from MK11(not a Rifle) :Aftermath is responsible, as Liu Kang's attempts to access the Hourglass' power resulted in a break where every character in Mortal Kombat's universe defeated Kronika and gained control of the Hourglass. In an attempt to stop the sorcerer from taking control of all of the multiple timelines, Liu Kang leads an army of good variations in an assault on Titan Shang Tsung's dimension, where, after an intense battle with all their evil counterparts, Liu Kang and a player-decided champion defeat him and erase his timeline from existence.

== Characters ==
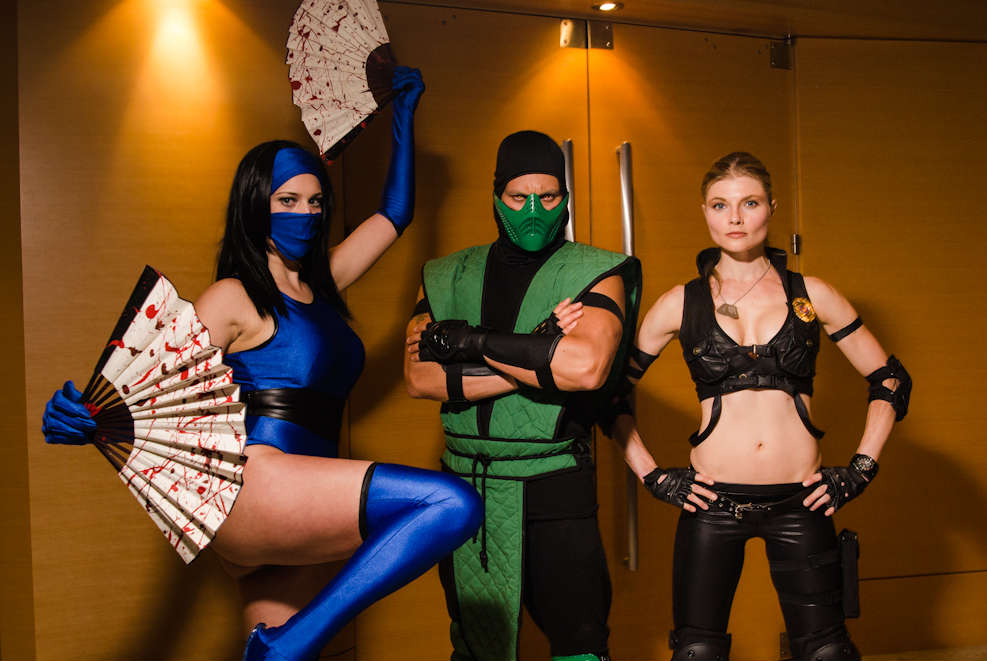
Cosplayers of Kitana, Reptile, and Sonya Blade at Dragon Con 2012

Through its iterations, the series has featured scores of player characters, some of them becoming mainstays, such as Baraka, Cassie Cage, Cyrax, Ermac, Fujin, Goro, Jade, Jax, Johnny Cage, Kabal, Kano, Kenshi, Kintaro, Kitana, Kung Lao, Li Mei, Liu Kang, Mileena, Motaro, Nightwolf, Noob Saibot, Quan Chi, Raiden, Rain, Reptile, Scorpion, Sektor, Shang Tsung, Shao Kahn, Sheeva, Shinnok, Sindel, Skarlet, Smoke, Sonya Blade, Stryker, Sub-Zero and Tanya. Among them are Earth's humans and cyborgs, good and evil deities, and denizens of Outworld and other realms.

Starting with Mortal Kombat vs. DC Universe, which featured several DC Universe heroes and villains, all subsequent games have included guest characters such as Freddy Krueger from A Nightmare on Elm Street franchise, Kratos from the God of War franchise (exclusively for PlayStation 3), Jason Voorhees from the Friday the 13th franchise, the Xenomorph from Alien, Leatherface from the Texas Chainsaw Massacre franchise, the titular character of Predator, the titular character of the Terminator franchise, the titular character of RoboCop, Spawn of Image Comics, Omni-Man from Image Comics's Invincible, John Rambo, Homelander from The Boys, and the Joker, who was previously in Mortal Kombat vs. DC Universe, Peacemaker (more specifically: the character from the DC Extended Universe and DC Universe), both from DC Comics, and Ghostface from the Scream franchise.

Scorpion, Sub-Zero and Raiden are the only three fighters who are playable in at least one major release of each main games of the series.

Kombatants	Mortal Kombat (1992)	II	3	4	Deadly Alliance	Deception	Armageddon	vs. DC Universe	Mortal Kombat (2011)	X	11	1	Total
Alien	No	No	No	No	No	No	No	No	No	DLC	No	No	1
Ashrah	No	No	No	No	No	Yes	Yes	No	No	No	Cameo	Yes	3
Baraka	No	Yes	Trilogy	Gold	No	Yes	Yes	Yes	Yes	CPU	Yes	Yes	9 (+ 1 CPU)
Batman	No	No	No	No	No	No	No	Yes	No	No	Cameo	No	1
Blaze	No	Cameo	Cameo	No	Yes	Cameo (Note: Later becomes playable in Unchained.)	Yes	No	No	Cameo	Cameo	No	3
Bo' Rai Cho	No	No	No	No	Yes	Yes	Yes	No	Cameo	DLC	Cameo	Cameo	4
Captain Marvel	No	No	No	No	No	No	No	Yes	No	No	No	No	1
Cassie Cage	No	No	No	No	No	No	No	No	No	Yes	Yes	Cameo	2
Catwoman	No	No	No	No	No	No	No	Yes	No	No	No	No	1
Cetrion	No	No	No	No	No	No	No	No	No	No	Yes	No	1
Chameleon	No	No	Trilogy	No	No	No	Yes	No	No	No	Cameo	No	2
Conan the Barbarian	No	No	No	No	No	No	No	No	No	No	No	DLC	1
Cyrax	No	No	Yes	Gold	Yes	Cameo	Yes	No	Yes	Cameo	CPU	DLC	6 (+ 1 CPU)
D'Vorah	No	No	No	No	No	No	No	No	No	Yes	Yes	No	2
Daegon	No	No	No	No	No	No	Yes	No	Cameo	Cameo	Cameo	Cameo	1
Dairou	No	No	No	No	No	Yes	Yes	No	No	No	Cameo	No	2
Darkseid	No	No	No	No	No	No	No	Yes	No	No	No	No	1
Darrius	No	No	No	No	No	Yes	Yes	No	No	No	Cameo	CPU	2 (+ 1 CPU)
Deathstroke	No	No	No	No	No	No	No	Yes	No	No	No	No	1
Drahmin	No	No	No	No	Yes	Cameo	Yes	No	No	No	Cameo	No	2
Ermac	No	No	Ultimate	No	No	Yes	Yes	No	Yes	Yes	Cameo	DLC	6
Erron Black	No	No	No	No	No	No	No	No	No	Yes	Yes	Cameo	2
Ferra & Torr	No	No	No	No	No	No	No	No	No	Yes	Cameo	DLC	1 (+ 1 CPU)
Floyd	No	No	No	No	No	No	No	No	No	No	No	DLC	0 (+ 1 CPU)
Freddy Krueger	No	No	No	No	No	No	No	No	DLC	No	No	No	1
Frost	No	No	No	No	Yes	Cameo	Yes	No	Cameo	Cameo	Yes	CPU	4 (+ 1 CPU)
Fujin	No	No	No	Yes	No	Cameo	Yes	Cameo	Cameo	Cameo	DLC	No	3
Geras	No	No	No	No	No	No	No	No	No	No	Yes	Yes	2
Ghostface	No	No	No	No	No	No	No	No	No	No	No	DLC	1
Goro	CPU (Note: Playable only in the Game Boy port.)	Cameo	Trilogy	Yes	No	GameCube only	Yes	No	CPU	DLC	Cameo	CPU	5 (+ 3 CPU)
Green Lantern	No	No	No	No	No	No	No	Yes	No	No	No	No	1
Havik	No	No	No	No	No	Yes	Yes	No	Cameo	Cameo	Cameo	Yes	3
Homelander	No	No	No	No	No	No	No	No	No	No	No	DLC	1
Hotaru	No	No	No	No	No	Yes	Yes	No	Cameo	No	Cameo	No	2
Hsu Hao	No	No	No	No	Yes	Cameo	Yes	No	No	Cameo	Cameo	No	2
Jacqui Briggs	No	No	No	No	No	No	No	No	No	Yes	Yes	Cameo	2
Jade	No	CPU	Ultimate	No	No	Yes	Yes	No	Yes	Cameo	Yes	No	5 (+ 1 CPU)
Jarek	No	No	No	Yes	No	Cameo	Yes	No	No	No	Cameo	Cameo	2
Jason Voorhees	No	No	No	No	No	No	No	No	No	DLC	No	No	1
Jax Briggs	No	Yes	Yes	Yes	Yes	Cameo	Yes	Yes	Yes	Yes	Yes	CPU	10 (+ 1 CPU)
John Rambo	No	No	No	No	No	No	No	No	No	No	DLC	No	1
Johnny Cage	Yes	Yes	Trilogy	Yes	Yes	Cameo	Yes	No	Yes	Yes	Yes	Yes	10
Kabal	No	No	Yes	No	No	Yes	Yes	No	Yes	Cameo	Yes	No	5
Kai	No	No	No	Yes	No	Cameo	Yes	No	No	No	No	No	2
Kano	Yes	Cameo	Yes	No	Yes	Cameo	Yes	Yes	Yes	Yes	Yes	CPU	8 (+ 1 CPU)
Kenshi	No	No	No	No	Yes	Yes	Yes	No	DLC	Yes	Cameo	Yes	6
Khameleon	No	No	Only in Trilogy N64	No	No	No	Wii only	No	No	Cameo	No	DLC	2 (+ 1 CPU)
Kintaro	No	CPU	Trilogy	No	No	Cameo	Yes	No	CPU	Cameo	Cameo	No	2 (+ 2 CPU)
Kira	No	No	No	No	No	Yes	Yes	No	Cameo	No	No	Cameo	2
Kitana	No	Yes	Cameo (Note: Later becomes playable in Ultimate.)	Cameo (Note: Later becomes playable in Gold.)	Yes	Cameo	Yes	Yes	Yes	Yes	Yes	Yes	11
Kobra	No	No	No	No	No	Yes	Yes	No	No	No	No	Cameo	2
Kollector	No	No	No	No	No	No	No	No	No	No	Yes	Cameo	1
Kotal Kahn	No	No	No	No	No	No	No	No	No	Yes	Yes	Cameo	2
Kratos	No	No	No	No	No	No	No	No	PS3 only	No	No	No	1
Kronika	No	No	No	No	No	No	No	No	No	No	CPU	Cameo	0 (+ 1 CPU)
Kung Jin	No	No	No	No	No	No	No	No	No	Yes	Cameo	Cameo	1
Kung Lao	No	Yes	Yes	Gold	Yes	Cameo	Yes	No	Yes	Yes	Yes	Yes	9
Kurtis Stryker	No	No	Yes	No	No	Cameo	Yes	No	Yes	Cameo	Cameo	CPU	3 (+ 1 CPU)
Leatherface	No	No	No	No	No	No	No	No	No	DLC	No	No	1
Lex Luthor	No	No	No	No	No	No	No	Yes	No	No	No	No	1
Li Mei	No	No	No	No	Yes	Yes	Yes	No	Cameo	Cameo	No	Yes	4
Liu Kang	Yes	Yes	Yes	Yes	Cameo	Yes	Yes	Yes	Yes	Yes	Yes	Yes	11
Madam Bo	No	No	No	No	No	No	No	No	No	No	No	DLC	0 (+ 1 CPU)
Mavado	No	No	No	No	Yes	Cameo	Yes	No	No	Cameo	No	DLC	2 (+ 1 CPU)
Meat	No	No	No	Yes	No	Cameo	Yes	No	Cameo	Cameo	Cameo	No	2
Mileena	No	Yes	Ultimate	Gold	No	Yes	Yes	No	Yes	Yes	DLC	Yes	9
Mokap	No	No	No	No	Yes	Cameo	Yes	No	No	No	Cameo	No	2
Moloch	No	No	No	No	CPU	Cameo	Yes	No	No	Cameo	Cameo	No	1 (+ 1 CPU)
Motaro	No	No	CPU (Note: Later becomes playable in Trilogy.)	No	No	Cameo	Yes	No	Cameo	No	Cameo	CPU	2 (+ 1 CPU)
Nightwolf	No	No	Yes	No	No	Yes	Yes	No	Yes	Cameo	DLC	Cameo	5
Nitara	No	No	No	No	Yes	Cameo	Yes	No	No	No	Cameo	Yes	3
Noob Saibot	No	CPU	CPU (Note: Later becomes playable in Ultimate Wavenet.)	Yes	Tournament Edition	Paired with Smoke	Yes	No	Yes	Cameo	Yes	DLC	8 (+ 1 CPU)
Omni-Man	No	No	No	No	No	No	No	No	No	No	No	DLC	1
Onaga	No	No	No	No	Cameo	CPU	Yes	No	Cameo	Cameo	Cameo	Cameo	1 (+ 1 CPU)
Peacemaker	No	No	No	No	No	No	No	No	No	No	No	DLC	1
Predator	No	No	No	No	No	No	No	No	No	DLC	No	No	1
Quan Chi	No	No	No	Yes	Yes	Cameo	Yes	Cameo	Yes	Yes	Cameo	DLC	6
Raiden	Yes	Yes	Cameo	Yes	Yes	Yes	Yes	Yes	Yes	Yes	Yes	Yes	12
Rain	No	No	Ultimate Console	No	No	Cameo	Yes	No	DLC	CPU	DLC	Yes	5 (+ 1 CPU)
Reiko	No	No	No	Yes	No	Cameo	Yes	No	Cameo	No	Cameo	Yes	3
Reptile	CPU	Yes	Ultimate	Yes	Yes	Cameo	Yes	No	Yes	Yes	Cameo	Yes	8 (+ 1 CPU)
RoboCop	No	No	No	No	No	No	No	No	No	No	DLC	No	1
Sareena	No	No	No	No	Tournament Edition	Cameo	Yes	No	Cameo	Cameo	Cameo	CPU	2 (+ 1 CPU)
Scorpion	Yes	Yes	Ultimate	Yes	Yes	Yes	Yes	Yes	Yes	Yes	Yes	Yes	12
Sektor	No	No	Yes	Gold	Tournament Edition	Cameo	Yes	No	Yes	Cameo	CPU	DLC	6 (+ 1 CPU)
Shang Tsung	CPU	Yes	Yes	No	Yes	Cameo	Yes	Yes	Yes	Cameo	DLC	DLC	8 (+ 1 CPU)
Shao Khan	No	CPU	CPU	No	Cameo	GameCube only	Yes	Yes	CPU	Cameo	DLC	Yes	6 (+ 2 CPU)
Sheeva	No	No	Yes	No	No	Cameo	Yes	No	Yes	No	DLC	No	4
Shinnok	No	No	No	Yes	No	Cameo	Yes	No	Cameo	Yes	Cameo	Cameo	3
Shujinko	No	No	No	No	No	Yes	Yes	No	No	Cameo	No	CPU	2 (+ 1 CPU)
Sindel	No	No	Yes	No	No	Yes	Yes	No	Yes	CPU	DLC	Yes	6 (+ 1 CPU)
Skarlet	No	No	No	No	No	No	No	No	DLC	No	Yes	No	2
Smoke	No	CPU	Yes	No	No	Paired with Noob Saibot	Yes	No	Yes	Cameo	Cameo	Yes	5 (+ 1 CPU)
Sonya Blade	Yes	Cameo	Yes	Yes	Yes	Cameo	Yes	Yes	Yes	Yes	Yes	CPU	9 (+ 1 CPU)
Spawn	No	No	No	No	No	No	No	No	No	No	DLC	No	1
Sub-Zero	Yes	Yes	Yes	Yes	Yes	Yes	Yes	Yes	Yes	Yes	Yes	Yes	12
Superman	No	No	No	No	No	No	No	Yes	No	No	No	No	1
T-1000	No	No	No	No	No	No	No	No	No	No	No	DLC	1
Takeda	No	No	No	No	No	No	No	No	No	Yes	Cameo	DLC	2
Tanya	No	No	No	Yes	No	Yes	Yes	No	Cameo	DLC	Cameo	Yes	5
Taven	No	No	No	No	No	No	Yes	No	Cameo	Cameo	Cameo	Cameo	1
The Flash	No	No	No	No	No	No	No	Yes	No	No	No	No	1
The Joker	No	No	No	No	No	No	No	Yes	No	No	DLC	No	2
The Terminator	No	No	No	No	No	No	No	No	No	No	DLC	No	1
Tremor	No	No	No	No	No	No	No	No	PS Vita only	DLC	Cameo	DLC	1 (+ 2 CPU)
Triborg	No	No	No	No	No	No	No	No	No	DLC	Cameo	No	1
Wonder Woman	No	No	No	No	No	No	No	Yes	No	No	No	No	1
Total	7	12	32	25	26	30	63	22	28 (+ 4 DLC)	24 (+ 9 DLC)	24 (+ 13 DLC)	22 (+ 13 DLC)	

== Development ==
Release timeline Main series in bold
1992	**Mortal Kombat**
1993	**Mortal Kombat II**
1994
1995	**Mortal Kombat 3**
1995	Ultimate Mortal Kombat 3
1996	Mortal Kombat Trilogy
1997	Mortal Kombat Mythologies: Sub-Zero
1997	**Mortal Kombat 4**
1998
1999	Mortal Kombat Gold
2000	Mortal Kombat: Special Forces
2001	Mortal Kombat Advance
2002	**Mortal Kombat: Deadly Alliance**
2003	Mortal Kombat: Tournament Edition
2004	**Mortal Kombat: Deception**
2005	Mortal Kombat: Shaolin Monks
2006	**Mortal Kombat: Armageddon**
2006	Mortal Kombat: Unchained
2007	Ultimate Mortal Kombat
2008	**Mortal Kombat vs. DC Universe**
2009
2010
2011	**Mortal Kombat**
2011	Mortal Kombat Arcade Kollection
2012	Mortal Kombat: Komplete Edition
2013
2014
2015	**Mortal Kombat X**
2015	Mortal Kombat Mobile
2016	Mortal Kombat XL
2017
2018
2019	**Mortal Kombat 11**
2020	Mortal Kombat 11: Aftermath
2020	Mortal Kombat 11: Ultimate
2021
2022
2023	**Mortal Kombat 1**
2023	Mortal Kombat: Onslaught
2024	Mortal Kombat 1: Khaos Reigns
2025	Mortal Kombat 1: Definitive Edition
2025	Mortal Kombat: Legacy Kollection

=== Origins ===
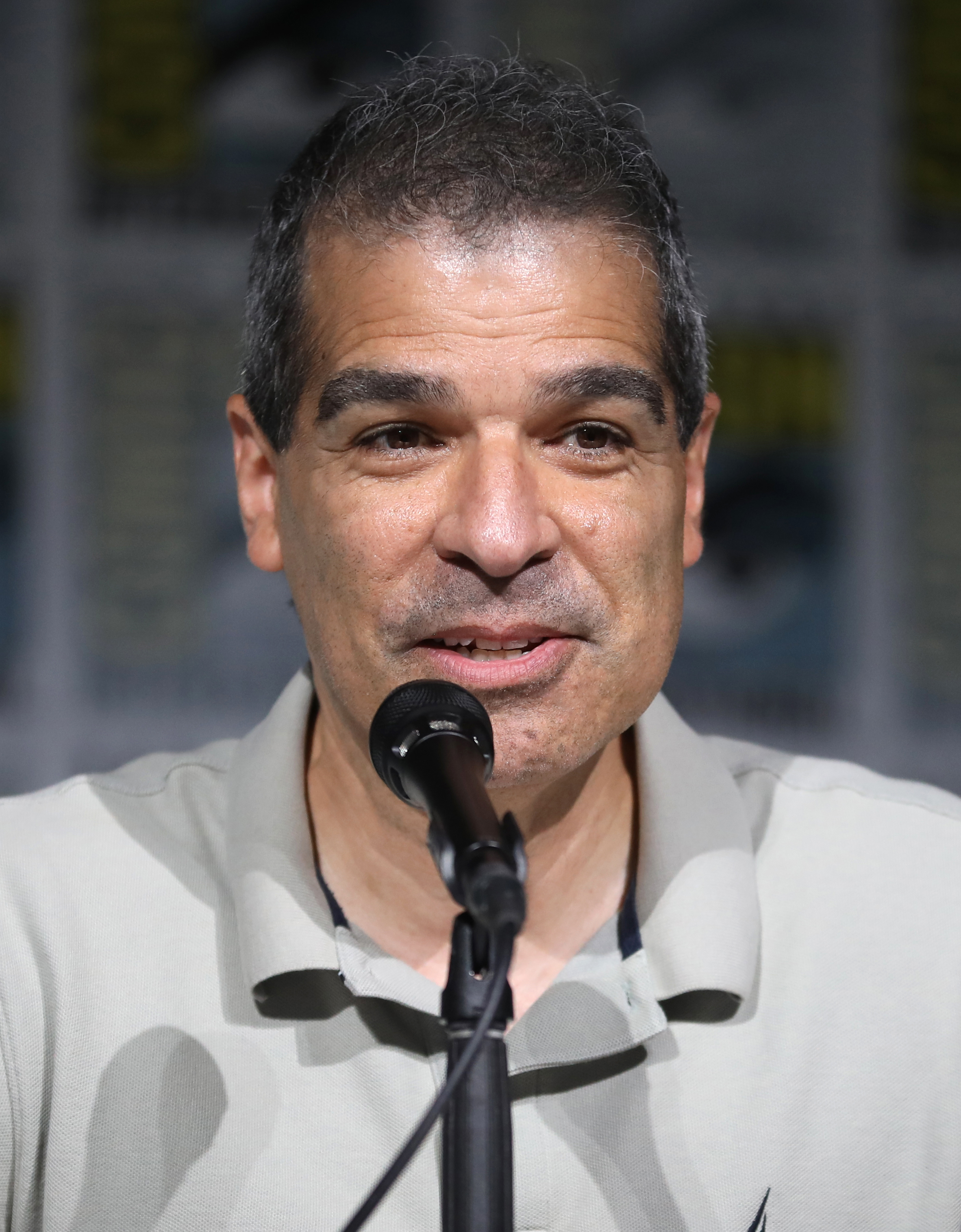
Ed Boon (2023)

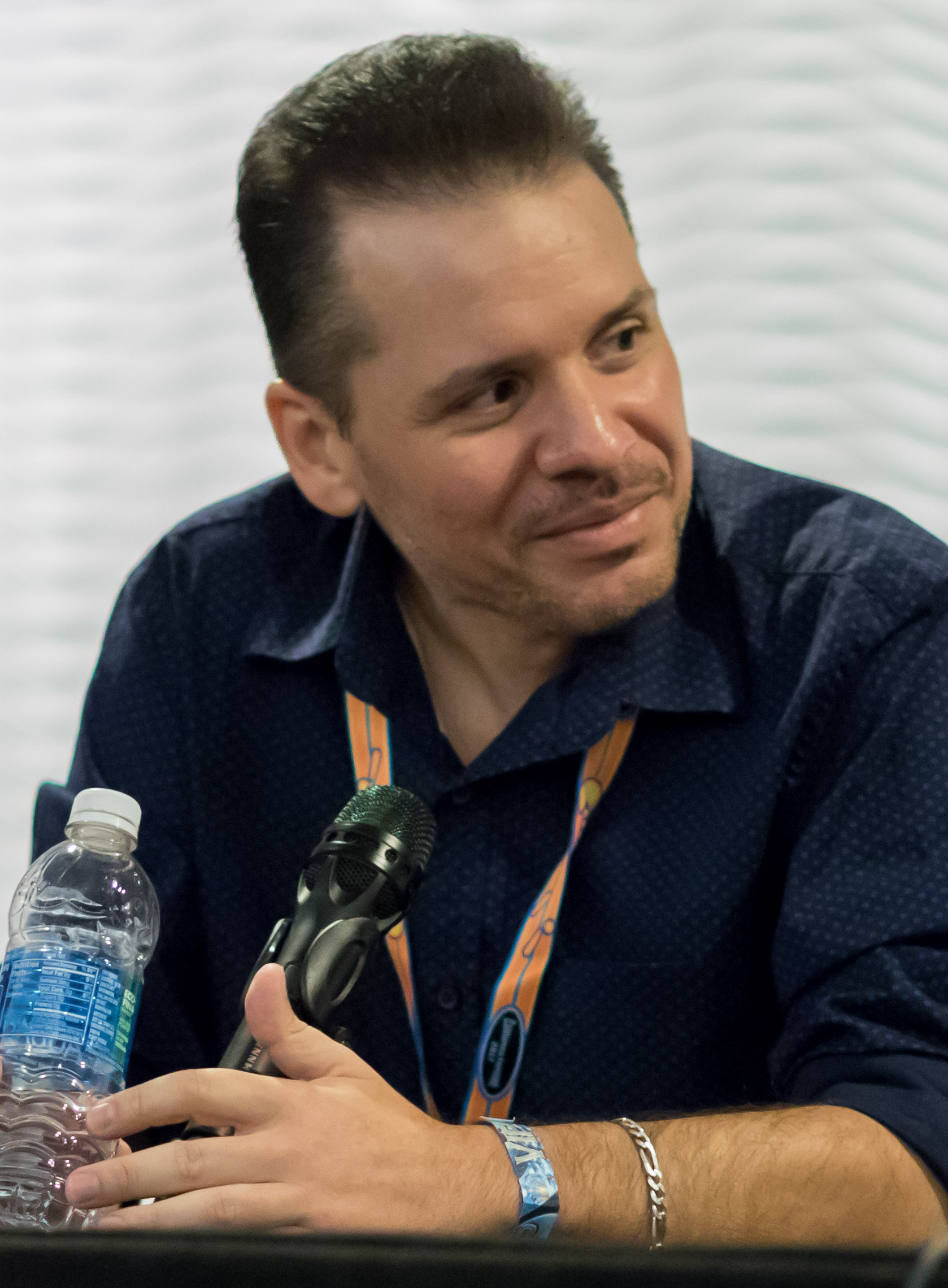
John Tobias (2017)

Mortal Kombat started development in 1991 with four people: Ed Boon (programming), John Tobias (art and story), John Vogel (graphics), and Dan Forden (sound design). According to Mortal Kombat actors Richard Divizio and Daniel Pesina, the first game began as a ninja-themed project by John Tobias (a young new employee of Midway Games at the time) and them as well as Carlos Pesina, however their pitch to Tobias' boss Ed Boon was rejected by the management of Midway. Midway was approached to create a video game adaptation of the then-upcoming 1992 film Universal Soldier, starring Jean-Claude Van Damme, and Tobias imagined a fighting game featuring a digitized version of Van Damme. Intending to make a game "a lot more hard edge, a little bit more serious, a little bit more like Enter the Dragon or Bloodsport" than contemporary cartoonish fighting games, Tobias and Boon decided to continue their project even after the deal to use the Bloodsport license fell through. The first of Mortal Kombat characters, Johnny Cage (Daniel Pesina), became "a spoof on the whole Van Damme situation." Divizio credits himself with convincing Tobias to go back to the original idea and trying again.

It was the success of Capcom's Street Fighter II: The World Warrior that convinced Midway Games to let the team produce their own arcade fighting game, the genre chosen by Tobias for his game as to let him use as large digitized sprites as possible, but there was not much influence by Street Fighter II on the project. According to Tobias, who cited 1984's Karate Champ as an inspiration, they intentionally worked on making a game different from Capcom's title in every way. Besides the digitized characters that differentiated it from its contemporaries' hand-drawn ones, one stark difference was in the very high amount of blood and violence. Capcom's senior director of communications later compared Street Fighter and Mortal Kombat by asking if the interviewer preferred the "precision and depth" of Street Fighter or the "gore and comedy" of Mortal Kombat and also stated that the Street Fighter and Mortal Kombat rivalry was considered similar to the Coke and Pepsi rivalry in the 1990s.

Mortal Kombat didn't rely on just good looks and gore for its success. Although the intense gore was a great way to attract attention, Mortal Kombat offered another side – an often-overlooked side – that kept people coming back for more: its storyline, including the uniquely different kind of gameplay as far as the fighting system within itself.

— GameSpot

John Tobias said that his inspirations for the game's story and characters came from Chinese mythology and some of the stories and rumored events about the Shaolin monks. Regarding the film Big Trouble in Little China, Tobias wrote that although the film "kind of Americanized my obsession for supernatural kung fu films from China, it was not my biggest influence. My biggest influences came from Tsui Hark films -- Zu Warriors & The Swordsman. We had to get them from bootleggers in Chicago's Chinatown." In 1995, he said about their general process of designing characters for the series: "First we figure out the type, like she or he and will she/he be big or small. Then we'll get the theme of the characters, like ninja or robot. Then we'll design the costume, and while doing that we create the storyline and how s/he fits into the universe. Then we'll find an actor that kinda resembles our character." Tobias' writing and artistic input on the series ended around 2000 following the release of Mortal Kombat 4. In 2012, he said: "I knew exactly what I was going to do with a future story. A few years ago, I [wrote] a sort of sequel to the first MK film and an advancement to the game's mythological roots."

The title Mortal Kombat was the idea of pinball designer Steve Ritchie, following difficulties trademarking the original title of Mortal Combat. Since then, the series often intentionally misspells various words with the letter "K" in place of "C" for the hard C sound. According to Boon, during the Mortal Kombat games' development they usually spell such words correctly, only making the substitution when one of the developers suggests it.

=== Graphics ===
The characters of the original Mortal Kombat and its initial sequels were created using digitized sprites mostly based on filmed actors, as opposed to hand-drawn graphics. Mortal Kombat games were known for their extensive use of palette swapping, which was used for the ninja characters; many of the most popular characters have originated as palette swaps. In the first game, the male ninja fighters were essentially the same character; only the colors of their attire, fighting stance, and special techniques mark a difference. Later games added further ninjas based on the same model, as well as several female ninja color swap characters initially also using just one base model. All of them gradually became very different characters in the following installments of the series. Eventually, Mortal Kombat 4 brought the series into 3D, replacing the digitized fighters of previous games with polygon models animated using motion capture technology.

=== Hidden content ===
Most series releases included secret characters, secret games, and other Easter eggs. The original game contained the hidden fighter Reptile, who could be fought by players if they fulfilled an exact set of requirements. A counter for ERMACS (short for error macros) on the game's audits screen was additionally interpreted by players as referring to a second hidden character named Ermac. Midway denied the character's existence in the series before adding him to Ultimate Mortal Kombat 3 in response to the player rumors and feedback.

Some Easter eggs originated from in-jokes among the series developers. One example is "Toasty", which was included in Mortal Kombat II in the form of an image of sound designer Dan Forden that randomly appeared in a lower corner of the screen after a player landed an uppercut. Hidden games of Pong and Galaga were included in Mortal Kombat II and Mortal Kombat 3, respectively.

== Games ==
Overview over titles and versions in the Mortal Kombat series
Title	Release	Original platform	Ports	Notes
Mortal Kombat	1992	Arcade	Various	The original Mortal Kombat game.
Mortal Kombat II	1993	Arcade	Various	Second main game. Sequel to Mortal Kombat.
Mortal Kombat 3	1995	Arcade	Various	Third main game. Sequel to Mortal Kombat II.
Ultimate Mortal Kombat 3	1995	Arcade	Various	Upgraded version of Mortal Kombat 3.
Mortal Kombat Trilogy	1996	PS1, N64	Saturn, Windows, Game.com, R-Zone	Second upgraded version of Mortal Kombat 3.
Mortal Kombat Mythologies: Sub-Zero	1997	PS1, N64	—N/a	First of four spin-off games. An action-adventure beat 'em up video game starring Sub-Zero. Prequel to the first Mortal Kombat.
Mortal Kombat 4	1997	Arcade	PS1, N64, Windows, GBC	Fourth main game. Sequel to Mortal Kombat 3. First 3D video game. Last MK game to appear in arcades.
Mortal Kombat Gold	1999	Dreamcast	—N/a	Upgraded version of Mortal Kombat 4, made for the Sega Dreamcast only.
Mortal Kombat: Special Forces	2000	PS1	—N/a	Second of four spin-off games. An action-adventure beat 'em up video game starring Jax. Prequel to the first Mortal Kombat.
Mortal Kombat Advance	2001	GBA	—N/a	The Game Boy Advance version of Ultimate Mortal Kombat 3.
Mortal Kombat: Deadly Alliance	2002	PS2, Xbox, GCN	GBA	Fifth main game. Sequel to Mortal Kombat 4.
Mortal Kombat: Tournament Edition	2003	GBA	—N/a	The second GBA version of Mortal Kombat: Deadly Alliance.
Mortal Kombat: Deception	2004	PS2, Xbox, GCN	—N/a	Sixth main game. Sequel to Mortal Kombat: Deadly Alliance.
Mortal Kombat: Shaolin Monks	2005	PS2, Xbox	—N/a	Third of four spin-off games. An action-adventure beat 'em up video game starring Liu Kang and Kung Lao, set in an alternate timeline between Mortal Kombat and Mortal Kombat II.
Mortal Kombat: Armageddon	2006	PS2, Xbox	Wii (2007)	Seventh main game. Sequel to Mortal Kombat: Deception, and the final title of the original main series.
Mortal Kombat: Unchained	2006	PSP	—N/a	The PlayStation Portable version of Deception.
Ultimate Mortal Kombat	2007	NDS	—N/a	Re-release of Ultimate Mortal Kombat 3 on the Nintendo DS with additional features.
Mortal Kombat vs. DC Universe	2008	PS3, Xbox 360	—N/a	Eighth main game. A non-canonical crossover set in an alternate timeline between Mortal Kombat II and Mortal Kombat 3.
Mortal Kombat	2011	PS3, Xbox 360	PS Vita (2012), Windows (2013)	Ninth main game. A reboot story containing plots from the first three games (story mode takes place after the events of Armageddon). An upgraded version containing all DLCs released as Mortal Kombat: Komplete Edition.
Mortal Kombat Arcade Kollection	2011	PS3, Xbox 360	Windows (2012)	A compilation of Mortal Kombat, Mortal Kombat II, and Ultimate Mortal Kombat 3 with online play.
Mortal Kombat X	2015	PS4, Xbox One, Windows	Android, iOS	Tenth main game. Sequel to 2011's Mortal Kombat. An upgraded version containing all DLCs released as Mortal Kombat XL.
Mortal Kombat Mobile	2015	Android, iOS, iPadOS	—N/a	Mobile version of Mortal Kombat X, this free-to-play mobile game has received updates well into the 2020s.
Mortal Kombat 11	2019	Nintendo Switch, Google Stadia, PS4, Xbox One, Windows	PS5 (2020), Xbox Series X/S (2020)	Eleventh main game. Sequel to Mortal Kombat X. An expansion titled Mortal Kombat 11: Aftermath was released in 2020. An upgraded version containing all DLCs released as Mortal Kombat 11: Ultimate.
Mortal Kombat 1	2023	PS5, Xbox Series X/S, Nintendo Switch, Windows	—N/a	Twelfth main game. The continuation of Mortal Kombat 11 and series' second reboot. An expansion titled Mortal Kombat 1: Khaos Reigns was released in 2024. An upgraded version containing all DLCs released as Mortal Kombat 1: Definitive Edition in 2025.
Mortal Kombat: Onslaught	2023	Android, iOS	—N/a	Fourth of four spin-off games. An action-adventure beat 'em up role-playing game. Set in an alternate timeline between Mortal Kombat X and Mortal Kombat 11. Shut down and rendered inaccessible in October 2024.
Mortal Kombat: Legacy Kollection	2025	Nintendo Switch, Nintendo Switch 2, PS4, PS5, Windows, Xbox One, Xbox Series X/S	—N/a	A compilation of Mortal Kombat, Mortal Kombat II, Mortal Kombat 3, Ultimate Mortal Kombat 3, Mortal Kombat Trilogy, Mortal Kombat Mythologies: Sub-Zero, Mortal Kombat 4, Mortal Kombat: Special Forces, Mortal Kombat Advance, Mortal Kombat: Deadly Alliance and Mortal Kombat: Tournament Edition.

=== Main series ===
The original Mortal Kombat game was released by Midway in arcades during August 1992, and has been ported to several console and home computer systems, with early ports released by Acclaim Entertainment. The sequel, Mortal Kombat II, was released for arcades in 1993, featuring an increased roster and improved graphics and gameplay, then ported to the numerous home systems in 1993–1995, released again by Acclaim. Mortal Kombat 3 followed in 1995 in both arcade and home versions. Mortal Kombat 3 received two updates which expanded the number of characters and other features from the game: Ultimate Mortal Kombat 3, released that same year in arcades, and Mortal Kombat Trilogy, released for home consoles the following year. The following game, Mortal Kombat 4, was released in 1997, and marked the jump of the series to 3D rendered graphics instead of the digitized 2D graphics used in previous games. Mortal Kombat 4 was ported to the PlayStation, Nintendo 64 and Microsoft Windows. Mortal Kombat 4 was the last Mortal Kombat game released for arcades. Its updated version titled Mortal Kombat Gold was released for the Dreamcast in 1999.

At this point that the series started being targeted at consoles only. Also the series' naming scheme changed to favor the use of sub-titles instead of numbered installments, beginning with Mortal Kombat: Deadly Alliance in 2002. Deadly Alliance was released initially for the Xbox, PlayStation 2 and GameCube. Deadly Alliance was also the first Mortal Kombat game to feature fully 3D gameplay, where up to Mortal Kombat 4 the gameplay had stayed in a 2D plane; this trend would continue for the following two games.

The next sequel was 2004's Mortal Kombat: Deception, released for the PlayStation 2, Xbox, and GameCube. Its port for the PlayStation Portable, Mortal Kombat: Unchained, was released in 2006. Mortal Kombat: Armageddon was published in 2006 for the PlayStation 2, Xbox, and in 2007 for the Wii.

Mortal Kombat vs. DC Universe, a non-canonical crossover fighting game between the Mortal Kombat franchise and DC Comics, was released in 2008 for the PlayStation 3 and Xbox 360.

A ninth game in the series, a reboot titled Mortal Kombat, was developed by the former Midway Games, now known as NetherRealm Studios. It was released for the PlayStation 3 and Xbox 360 in 2011, and was ported to the PlayStation Vita in 2012 and Microsoft Windows in 2013. Downloadable content became a feature of games in the series at this time. Its first sequel, Mortal Kombat X, was released in 2015 on PlayStation 4, Xbox One, and Microsoft Windows, and marked a return to numbered sequels. This was paired with the first Mortal Kombat game for tablet and smartphones, Mortal Kombat Mobile. A follow-up, Mortal Kombat 11, was released in 2019 for the PlayStation 4, Xbox One, Nintendo Switch, and Microsoft Windows. A sequel to Mortal Kombat 11, Mortal Kombat 1, released in September 2023.

=== Spin-off games ===
Besides the fighting games, there are three action-adventure titles that work as spin-offs from the Mortal Kombat storyline. Mortal Kombat Mythologies: Sub-Zero was released in 1997 for the PlayStation and Nintendo 64; its story is focused on the first incarnation character of Sub-Zero and is focused in the timeline before the first Mortal Kombat game. The next action game was Mortal Kombat: Special Forces, released in 2000 for the PlayStation, starring Major Jackson Briggs in his mission to destroy the Black Dragon. Both games were critically panned (although the reception of Mythologies was more mediocre). Mortal Kombat: Shaolin Monks, developed by Midway Studios Los Angeles, was released in 2005 for the PlayStation 2 and the Xbox, starring Liu Kang and Kung Lao and retelling the events of Mortal Kombat II. A similar game entitled Mortal Kombat: Fire & Ice, which was to star Scorpion and again Sub-Zero, was canceled when the developers of Shaolin Monks "couldn't do it in time and under budget". On October 18, 2022, Mortal Kombat: Onslaught was announced; it is a role-playing game released in 2023 for Android and iOS. NetherRealm said it would be a cinematic experience and also it will be loyal to its core visceral nature.

== Other media ==
=== Films ===
==== Animated ====
An animated prequel to 1995's film adaptation Mortal Kombat, titled Mortal Kombat: The Journey Begins, was released direct-to-video in the same year as the live-action film.

A series of direct-to-video films titled Mortal Kombat Legends began in 2020. The first, Mortal Kombat Legends: Scorpion's Revenge, was released in April 2020, as the first R-rated Mortal Kombat film. The second film, Mortal Kombat Legends: Battle of the Realms, was released in August 2021. The third film, Mortal Kombat Legends: Snow Blind, was released on October 11, 2022. A fourth film, Mortal Kombat Legends: Cage Match, was released on October 17, 2023.

==== Live-action ====
Mortal Kombat was film adapted into two major features, Mortal Kombat (1995) and Mortal Kombat Annihilation (1997), both released by New Line Cinema. The first film was released on August 18, 1995, grossing $23 million on its first weekend. Despite mixed reviews from critics, Mortal Kombat became a financial success, grossing approximately $70 million in the U.S. and over $122 million worldwide; the film gained a cult following amongst fans of the video game series with Robin Shou, Linden Ashby, Cary-Hiroyuki Tagawa, Bridgette Wilson, Talisa Soto and Christopher Lambert starring, and its success launched the Hollywood career of its director, Paul W. S. Anderson. Mortal Kombat Annihilation was directed by John R. Leonetti with Shou and Soto as the only two returning from the first film. The film received a poor reception by critics, grossing $36 million in the U.S. and $51 million worldwide.

In 2010, director Kevin Tancharoen released an eight-minute short film titled Mortal Kombat: Rebirth, made as a proof of concept for Tancharoen's pitch of a reboot film franchise to Warner Bros. Pictures. Tancharoen later confirmed that the unofficial short featured the writing of Oren Uziel, who at the time was rumored to be writing the screenplay for a third Mortal Kombat film. In September 2011, New Line and Warner Bros. announced that Tancharoen had signed on to direct a new feature-length film from a screenplay written by Uziel, with the intention of aiming for an R rating. Shooting was expected to begin in March 2012 with a budget of well under $100 million (projected at between $40–50 million) and a release date of 2013, but was ultimately delayed due to budget constraints. Tancharoen quit the production in October 2013.

A reboot, Mortal Kombat (2021), was released on April 23, 2021, to mixed reviews, grossing over $84 million worldwide from theaters while also releasing simultaneously on the streaming service HBO Max. Production restarted on a reboot in 2015 when James Wan joined to produce and director Simon McQuoid joined the following year. The script was written by Greg Russo and David Callaham with Lewis Tan, Jessica McNamee, Josh Lawson, Tadanobu Asano, and Hiroyuki Sanada starring. A sequel, Mortal Kombat II, with McQuoid returning as director and with a screenplay written by Jeremy Slater, was released on May 8, 2026.

Characters	Films			
Characters	Mortal Kombat	Mortal Kombat Annihilation	Mortal Kombat	Mortal Kombat II
Characters	1995	1997	2021	2026
Raiden	Christopher Lambert	James Remar	Tadanobu Asano	Tadanobu Asano
Liu Kang	Robin Shou	Robin Shou	Ludi Lin	Ludi Lin
Johnny Cage	Linden Ashby	Chris Conrad		Karl Urban
Shang Tsung	Cary-Hiroyuki Tagawa		Chin Han	Chin Han
Sonya Blade	Bridgette Wilson	Sandra Hess	Jessica McNamee	Jessica McNamee
Kitana	Talisa Soto	Talisa Soto		Adeline Rudolph
Kano	Trevor Goddard		Josh Lawson	Josh Lawson
Scorpion	Chris Casamassa	J. J. Perry	Hiroyuki Sanada	Hiroyuki Sanada
Scorpion	Ed Boon (voice)	Ed Boon (voice)	Hiroyuki Sanada	Hiroyuki Sanada
Sub-Zero I/Noob Saibot	François Petit	J. J. Perry	Joe Taslim	Joe Taslim
Reptile	Keith Cooke Frank Welker (voice)		CGI	
Goro	Tom Woodruff, Jr. Kevin Michael Richardson (voice) Frank Welker (voice)		Angus Sampson (voice)	
Jax	Gregory McKinney	Lynn Red Williams	Mehcad Brooks	Mehcad Brooks
Shao Kahn	Frank Welker (voice)	Brian Thompson		Martyn Ford
Shinnok		Reiner Schöne		
Sindel		Musetta Vander		Ana Thu Nguyen
Jade		Irina Pantaeva		Tati Gabrielle
Motaro		Deron McBee		
Sheeva		Marjean Holden		
Sub-Zero II		Keith Cooke		
Nightwolf		Litefoot		
Ermac		John Medlen		
Cyrax		J. J. Perry		
Rain		Tyrone Wiggins		
Baraka		Dennis Keiffer		CJ. Bloomfield
Smoke		Ridley Tsui		
Mileena		Dana Hee	Sisi Stringer	
Cole Young*			Lewis Tan	Lewis Tan
Kung Lao			Max Huang	Max Huang
Kabal			Daniel Nelson Damon Herriman (voice)	
Reiko			Nathan Jones	
Nitara			Mel Jarnson	

* Cole Young is a film-exclusive character who has not appeared in any of the games.

=== Print media ===
==== Comics ====
Midway published official one-shot issues based on Mortal Kombat and Mortal Kombat II, which were written and illustrated by Tobias and set prior to the storylines of both games. From 1994 to 1995, Malibu Comics published a licensed series consisting of two six-issue miniseries in addition to one-shot specials and miniseries dedicated to specific characters. Special tie-in issues were packaged with the PC release of Mortal Kombat 4 and for Mortal Kombat vs. DC Universe, respectively. A Mortal Kombat X series by DC Comics, set before the game's events, ran from January to September 2015 with three miniseries of twelve issues that were released weekly in 36 chapter installments.

==== Novels ====
A novel titled Mortal Kombat was written by Jeff Rovin and published in 1995, and featured an original plot that preceded the events of the first game. Novelizations of both Mortal Kombat feature films were written by Martin Delrio and Jerome Preisler, respectively.

=== Music ===
Mortal Kombat: The Album, a techno album based on the first game, was created for Virgin America by Lords of Acid members Praga Khan and Oliver Adams as The Immortals in 1994. Its iconic theme "Techno Syndrome", incorporating the "Mortal Kombat!" yell first shown in the Mortal Kombat commercial for home systems, was released in 1993 as a single and was used as a theme music for the Mortal Kombat film series. Each film had their own soundtracks (including the hit and award-winning compilation album Mortal Kombat: Original Motion Picture Soundtrack), as had the second video game (Mortal Kombat II: Music from the Arcade Game Soundtrack). The 2011 video game saw the release of Mortal Kombat: Songs Inspired by the Warriors, a new soundtrack album featuring electronic music by various artists.

=== Television ===
==== Animated ====
An animated series titled Mortal Kombat: Defenders of the Realm was released in 1996. It ran for one season and received negative reviews.

==== Live-action ====
In 1998, Mortal Kombat: Conquest was released. It lasted one season. In 2010, Warner Premiere ordered a web series inspired by the Rebirth short, titled Mortal Kombat: Legacy and also directed by Kevin Tancharoen. The series' first season was released for free on YouTube starting in April 2011, promoted by Machinima.com, and the second season arrived in 2013.

In 2014, Blue Ribbon Content had been developing a live-action series that was to tie in with Mortal Kombat X for a planned 2016 release, titled Mortal Kombat: Generations. The series, however, was not released.

=== Stage show ===
A stage show titled Mortal Kombat: Live Tour was launched at the end of 1995, expanded to 1996, and featured Mortal Kombat characters in a theatrical display on stage.

=== Online gambling game ===
Mortal Kombat: Federation of Martial Arts technically, this was Mortal Kombat's first "web series," although it was more of an online gambling game with fake money. Mortal Kombat's first popular web series would come a decade later and be called Mortal Kombat: Legacy.

=== Collectible card games ===
BradyGames produced the collectible card game Mortal Kombat Kard Game in 1995. The Duelist called the game a "worse clone" of Magic: the Gathering. Score Entertainment's 2005 collectible card game Epic Battles also used some of the Mortal Kombat characters.

== Reception ==
Aggregate review scores As of June 18, 2019.
Game	GameRankings	Metacritic
Mortal Kombat	(GEN) 84.17% (SNES) 83.33% (SCD) 60.00% (GB) 42.17%	–
Mortal Kombat II	(SNES) 85.87% (GEN) 85.62% (PS3) 68.40% (GB) 64.50% (SAT) 57.50%	(PS3) 72
Mortal Kombat 3	(SNES) 80.23% (GEN) 76.67% (PS1) 70.33%	–
Mortal Kombat Mythologies: Sub-Zero	(PS1) 53.20% (N64) 44.84%	–
Mortal Kombat 4	(N64) 76.07% (PS1) 75.75% (PC) 72.14% (DC) 54.97% (GBC) 46.00%	–
Mortal Kombat: Special Forces	(PS1) 40.23%	(PS1) 28
Mortal Kombat: Deadly Alliance	(GBA) 84.63% (Xbox) 82.68% (PS2) 81.99% (GC) 81.82%	(GBA) 81 (Xbox) 81 (GC) 81 (PS2) 79
Mortal Kombat: Deception	(PS2) 82.00% (Xbox) 81.31% (GC) 77.43% (PSP) 70.88%	(PS2) 81 (Xbox) 81 (GC) 77 (PSP) 70
Mortal Kombat: Shaolin Monks	(Xbox) 80.64% (PS2) 78.70%	(Xbox) 78 (PS2) 77
Mortal Kombat: Armageddon	(Xbox) 77.39% (PS2) 75.33% (Wii) 72.49%	(Xbox) 77 (PS2) 75 (Wii) 71
Mortal Kombat vs. DC Universe	(PS3) 77.87% (X360) 74.55%	(PS3) 76 (X360) 72
Mortal Kombat	(Vita) 87.31% (PS3) 86.09% (X360) 85.67%	(X360) 86 (Vita) 85 (PS3) 84
Mortal Kombat X	(XONE) 85.97% (PS4) 84.18% (PC) 75.20%	(XONE) 86 (PS4) 83 (PC) 76
Mortal Kombat 11	-	(PS4) 82 (XONE) 86 (PC) 82 (NS) 78
Mortal Kombat 1		
Mortal Kombat: Onslaught		

=== Sales ===
Mortal Kombat has been one of the most successful fighting game franchises in video game history, previously only trailing Bandai Namco's Tekken, Capcom's Street Fighter, and Nintendo's Super Smash Bros. As of 2021, it has surpassed the competitor fighting game franchises in worldwide lifetime series sales. It generated more than $4 billion by the late 1990s and $5 billion in total revenue by 2000. A particularly successful game was Mortal Kombat II, which had unprecedented opening week sales figures never seen before in the video game industry, for the first time beating the box office numbers of summer hit films. The Mortal Kombat games, however, have not been localized in Japan after the Super Famicom release of Mortal Kombat II, due to content guidelines against depictions of blood, gore and dismemberment (Tobias blaming their "very americanized" character design).

Mortal Kombat games have sold more than 6 million units by 1994 and 26 million by 2007, and the figure has exceeded 30 million by 2012. As of 2022, the franchise had sold about 79 million units. By 2025, it has surpassed over 100 million copies.

=== Ratings, reviews, and awards ===
The 2008 edition of Guinness World Records Gamer's Edition awarded the Mortal Kombat series with seven world records, including "most successful fighting game series". The franchise holds ten world records in the 2011 Guinness World Records Gamer's Edition, including the "largest promotional campaign for a fighting video game" (Mortal Kombat 3), "highest grossing film based on a beat ‘em up video game" (Mortal Kombat 1996), and "most successful video game spin-off soundtrack album" (Mortal Kombat: Original Motion Picture Soundtrack).

Numerous publications described it as one of the most important and also most violent series in the history of video games; in 2011, the staff of GameSpy wrote "its place in fighting game history is undeniable". In 2009, GameTrailers ranked Mortal Kombat as the ninth top fighting game franchise as well as the seventh bloodiest series of all time. In 2012, Complex ranked Mortal Kombat as 37th best video game franchise overall, commenting on its "legendary status in video game history". Mortal Kombat as a series was also ranked as the goriest video game ever by CraveOnline in 2009 and by G4tv.com in 2011.

== Legacy and cultural impact ==
According to IGN, during the 1990s "waves of imitators began to flood the market, filling arcades with a sea of blood from games like Time Killers, Survival Arts, and Guardians of the Hood. Mortal Kombat had ushered in an era of exploitation games, both on consoles and in arcades, all engaging in a battle to see who can cram the most blood and guts onto a low-res screen." Notable Mortal Kombat clones, featuring violent finishing moves and/or digitized sprites, included Bio F.R.E.A.K.S., BloodStorm, Cardinal Syn, Catfight, Eternal Champions, Kasumi Ninja, Killer Instinct, Mace: The Dark Age, Primal Rage, Street Fighter: The Movie, Tattoo Assassins, Thrill Kill, Ultra Vortek, Way of the Warrior, and Midway's own War Gods. John Tobias commented: "Some of the copycat products back then kind of came and went because, on the surface level, the violence will attract some attention, but if there's not much to the product behind it, you're not going to last very long."

In a 2009 poll by GamePro, 21% of voters chose Mortal Kombat as their favorite fighting game series, ranking it third after Street Fighter and Tekken. In 2012, Capcom's Street Fighter producer Yoshinori Ono said he is getting a lot of requests for Street Fighter vs. Mortal Kombat and understands why people want it, "but it's easier said than done. Having Chun Li getting her spine ripped out, or Ryu's head bouncing off the floor...it doesn't necessarily match." In 2014, martial artist Frankie Edgar opined Mortal Kombat has been far superior to Street Fighter.

The series and its characters are also referenced in the various other works of popular culture, such as in the title of Powerglove's debut album Metal Kombat for the Mortal Man and the Workaholics episode "Model Kombat". According to Complex in 2012, "Years ago, Mortal Kombat became a phenomenon far outside gaming circles alone. Its name has become recognizable enough to be name dropped on sitcoms (Malcolm in the Middle and Married... with Children), found in movies (Christian Slater plays Mortal Kombat 4 in Very Bad Things), and used as part of cultural studies (see Justine Cassell and Henry Jenkins' book From Barbie to Mortal Kombat: Gender and Computer Games)." It was also featured in the film The Doom Generation. The name "Mortal Kombat" was even given to a dangerous illegal recreational drug that was introduced and caused multiple fatalities in early 2014.

In 2012, Tobias said: "If you look at any other pop culture phenomenon—like if you look at the Teenage Mutant Ninja Turtles, for instance—it became popular at the time right around when Mortal Kombat became popular, and it had its highs and lows, and here they are once again talking about a major motion picture. That's because of its place in pop culture. It's always there for someone to pick up, polish off, blow the dust off of it, and re-release it. And Mortal Kombat will always be that way. It'll be around 50 years from now."

Popular music artists, particularly in the rap and hip-hop genres, have made numerous references to Mortal Kombat and its characters in their songs. In Wale and Rihanna's hit 2013 song called "Bad (Remix)," for example, Wale says "you try and play Sub-Zero, I be Scorpion, pshh get over here today" in reference to Scorpion's iconic "get over here!" catchphrase. In Nicki Minaj's song "Miami" from her 2018 album called "Queen," she refers to herself as a made-up guest character in the line "Mortal Kombat, ninja Nicki, who ya pick is?"

Mortal Kombat crossover content, mainly from earlier games of the series, was also included in the second season of the sixth chapter of the online battle royale game Fortnite Battle Royale, which runs on a version of the Unreal Engine that also powers NetherRealm's Mortal Kombat games. At the beginning of this season, cosmetics based on the character Sub-Zero were available to unlock on the highest levels of the season's battle pass and his abilities could be obtainable as floor loot during a match. Midway through the season, three stages from the first two games in the series were added to the game's map to visit (The Living Forest, The Pit and The Dead Pool), with the opportunity to battle Scorpion as a boss and collect his abilities to use in battle during a match. At the same time, cosmetics for Scorpion, Kitana and Raiden, as well as some emotes based on the series, were released for purchase in the in-game shop. The series' trademark graphic violence was omitted in the crossover to maintain the upbeat visual style, audience accessibility and Teen ESRB rating of Battle Royale.

=== Competitive play ===
Fighting games have been a popular genre among tournaments since the late 1990s. Mortal Kombat has its place in some of the world's biggest fighting game tournaments including Evo and Combo Breaker, as well as many local and online tournaments around the world. Since the 2011 Mortal Kombat game was released, the game has been one of the most popular games at these events. Between 2014 and 2017, the game was mostly absent from the tournament scene, due to NetherRealm Studios being focused on their Injustice series as their top priority; Mortal Kombat games returned to Combo Breaker in 2018.

=== Controversies ===
The series was subject of a major video game controversy and several court cases, largely related to its extremely violent content, especially in relation to the original game which paved a way for the introduction of the ESRB (Entertainment Software Rating Board) game rating system in 1994 as well as the Australian Classification Board. Various games in the series, as well as advertisements for them, have been censored or banned in a number of countries. According to SuperData Research CEO Joost van Dreunen, "Because of the obvious rift between gamers on the one hand and adult society on the other, Mortal Kombat set the tone for what constituted gamer culture."

In Germany, every Mortal Kombat game was banned for ten years from its release until 2015. Mortal Kombat (2011) is also banned in South Korea, and was banned in Australia until February 2013. Mortal Kombat 11 is banned in Indonesia, Japan, China and Ukraine.

== See also ==
- List of best-selling video game franchises
- DC Universe
- List of fighting games
- Happy Tree Friends
- Violence and video games
- List of controversial video games
- Video game controversies
