= Mortal Kombat Mythologies: Sub-Zero =

1997 video game

- North American cover art
- Developer: Midway (Note: Additional support work and Nintendo 64 version development by Avalanche Software.)
- Publishers: NA: Midway; EU: GT Interactive
- Directors: Dimitrios Tianis; Bill O'Neil
- Producers: John Tobias; Dimitrios Tianis; Michael Gottlieb
- Designer: John Tobias
- Artists: John Tobias; Joshua Y. Tsui; Carlos Pesina; Eugene Geer
- Composer: Dan Forden
- Series: Mortal Kombat
- Platforms: PlayStation, Nintendo 64
- Release: PlayStation: NA: October 3, 1997; EU: December 2, 1997; Nintendo 64: NA: December 11, 1997; EU: February 12, 1998
- Genre: Action-adventure
- Mode: Single-player

Mortal Kombat Mythologies: Sub-Zero is a 1997 action-adventure game developed and published by Midway for the PlayStation and Nintendo 64. A spin-off of the Mortal Kombat franchise, it is the first installment not to be a fighting game. Set before the original Mortal Kombat game, it follows Bi-Han, the elder Sub-Zero, in his quest to find Shinnok's amulet. It also introduces characters and story elements that would be used by Mortal Kombat 4, which was released later the same year. Mythologies is the final game in the series to use digitized actors.

The game drew a divisive response from critics, with the PlayStation version considered the superior of the two releases. Praise was directed at the transition from the fighting game genre to action-adventure and the PlayStation version's live-action cutscenes, but the controls and punishing level design received criticism. Retrospective reviews have been more negative and some consider the game as one of the worst in the Mortal Kombat franchise. The game was re-released in 2025 as part of the Mortal Kombat: Legacy Kollection compilation.

== Gameplay ==
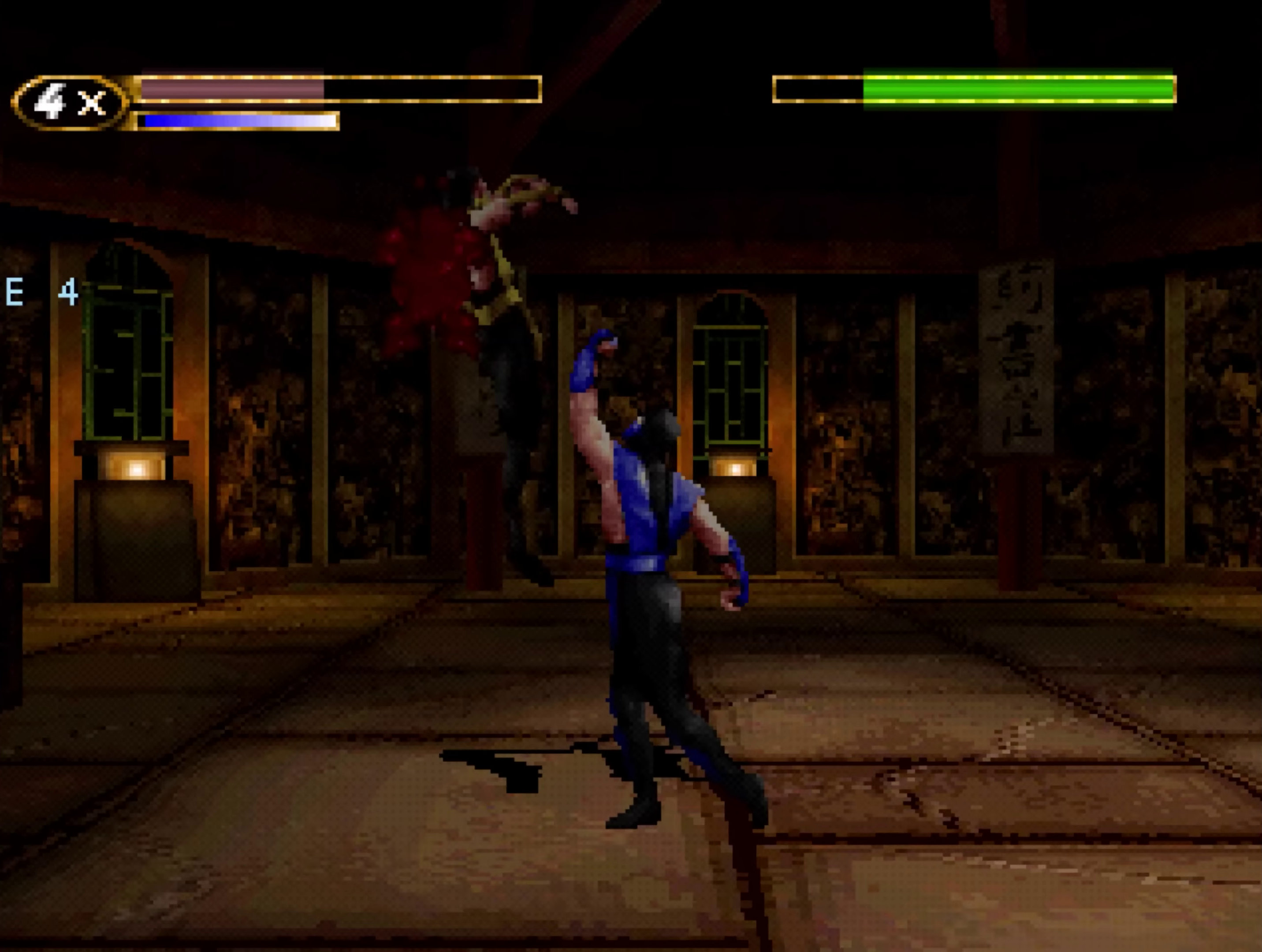
Gameplay screenshot

Although Mortal Kombat Mythologies: Sub-Zero is classified as an action-adventure game, its play controls are very similar to the 2D Mortal Kombat fighting games. The player has four attack buttons, along with a block button and a run button like in Mortal Kombat 3. The player controls Sub-Zero as they would in a fighting game, including the use of command-based special moves, to fight enemies and venture through levels. A "turn" button is used to change the direction Sub-Zero is facing, while an "action" button is used to pick up or use items. The player also has access to a status screen that keeps track of the player's inventory, experience points, and special moves they gain during the game.

The player begins the game with a small health gauge and a limited number of extra lives. Over the course of the game's progression the player can gain experience points by performing combos against enemies, which are then used to increase their character's strength and gain access to special moves. An "ice meter" will appear after the player begins to acquire special moves. Special moves require ice power in order to be performed. Health and ice power can be replenished by picking up items (although the ice meter will gradually replenish itself over time as well). The player also needs to retrieve key items. Passwords are used to keep track of the player's progress.

== Plot ==
The story is set before the events that took place in the original Mortal Kombat and follows the Lin Kuei assassin and thief Sub-Zero hired by the sorcerer Quan Chi to steal a map of elements from a Shaolin temple. Battling through the Shaolin monks who guarded the map, Sub-Zero faces his rival, Scorpion from the Shirai Ryu clan who was also hired by Quan Chi. Sub-Zero kills Scorpion and retrieves the map. Back at the headquarters of the Lin Kuei, Sub-Zero delivers the map to Quan Chi, who repays the Lin Kuei by eliminating all the members of the Shirai Ryu, the Lin Kuei's rival clan. Retaining the Lin Kuei's services, Quan Chi has Sub-Zero follow the map to the Temple of Elements in Nepal, where an amulet of "sentimental value" was resting.

Sub-Zero reaches the temple and went through its many challenges and obstacles, defeating the gods of Wind, Earth, Water, and Fire that protected the amulet. Just as Sub-Zero reaches out for it, Quan Chi takes the amulet, saying that it was actually the source of power for a fallen Elder God named Shinnok. Quan Chi disappears through a portal, and the thunder god Raiden accuses Sub-Zero, ordering him to go to the Netherealm to retrieve the amulet.

Sub-Zero is sent to the Netherealm but is trapped in the Prison of Souls by Quan Chi's guards. There, he is met by the undead spectre of his nemesis, Scorpion, who blames Sub-Zero for the destruction of his clan and family. Sub-Zero once again defeats Scorpion and escapes. He then fights Quan Chi's underlings: Kia, Sareena, and Jataaka. Retrieving their transportation crystals, he is able to get to Quan Chi's fortress. Sub-Zero defeats the three of them but canonically spares Sareena's life and goes to Quan Chi's room. The fight against Quan Chi ends with Sub-Zero's victory and Sareena finishing Quan Chi and him falling to his apparent death. As Sareena pleads to escape from the Netherealm, she is temporarily incapacitated by Shinnok. Sub-Zero steals the amulet from Shinnok and either defeats the Elder God in demonic form or escapes through a portal created by Raiden and delivers the amulet to the god. Returning to the Lin Kuei headquarters, Sub-Zero is invited by another sorcerer named Shang Tsung to compete in a tournament called Mortal Kombat.

== Characters ==
- Sub-Zero
- Scorpion
- Raiden
- Quan Chi
- Shinnok
- Sareena
- Wind God
- Earth God – Assigned by Raiden as the second of the four guardians along with the Wind God, Water God and Fire God in order to protect Shinnok's amulet until he was eliminated by Sub-Zero. Due to his giant size towering over Sub-Zero, he has the ability to stomp the ground while stones of rocks fall from above.
- Water God – The third of the four guardians assigned by Raiden to protect Shinnok's amulet until he was beaten by Sub-Zero. His powers and abilities are mostly jets of water and waves.
- Fire God – The guardian of Shinnok's amulet. Raiden assigns him as the last of the four guardians to protect the amulet until Sub-Zero defeats him in battle. His powers and abilities are mostly flames and fire, and because of this, Sub-Zero could not freeze him.
- Kia – One of the sub-bosses in Shinnok's Fortress. She is a member of the Brotherhood of Shadow and serves as one of three assassins to Quan Chi and Shinnok along with Sareena and Jataaka. She is the first of the assassins Sub-Zero must face before he can acquire the three crystals that power the teleporter to Quan Chi's lair. Gameplay-wise she is the least powerful of the trio, but equal in speed to Jataaka. Her weapon is a razor-shaped boomerang.
- Jataaka – One of the sub-bosses in Shinnok's Fortress and a member of the Brotherhood of Shadow. Gameplay-wise, she is as fast as Kia but more powerful. Her attacks consist of launching laser bolts from her sword as well as a weapon she uses to attack.

== Development ==
The making of Mortal Kombat Mythologies: Sub-Zero spanned about 14 months from start to finish, with news that the game was being worked on leaking to the press in the third quarter of 1996. Designer and Sub-Zero co-creator John Tobias said he was intrigued by the character's backstory and wanted to flesh it out. The main design team was located at Midway's Chicago offices and consisted of five artists, two programmers and a sound designer.

The graphics in Mortal Kombat Mythologies: Sub-Zero were created using many different techniques. While Sub-Zero and many of the more humanoid characters were created using Mortal Kombat's trademark of digitizing live actors, many of the more ominous enemies, as well as all of the backgrounds, were done in real-time 3D. This combination supposedly provides for a more realistic look than has ever been achieved in the previous Mortal Kombat games. Another addition to the Mortal Kombat universe was to use detailed cinematic sequences to help tell the story while the player progresses through the game. This was done by combining live actors with digital elements. The actors were taped in front of a green screen, and then they were digitally combined with 3D backdrops. The actual video shoot for these sequences took about a week to complete. The crew was kept to a minimum and the entire process from taping to post-production work took about a month.

== Reception ==
Reception

Aggregate score
Aggregator	Score	
Aggregator	N64	PS
GameRankings	45%	53%

Review scores
Publication	Score	
Publication	N64	PS
Consoles +	N/A	86%
Electronic Gaming Monthly	5/10, 4/10, 5/10, 4.5/10	4/10, 7.5/10, 4.5/10, 5.5/10
GameFan	150/300	170/300
GameRevolution	0.5/5	N/A
GameSpot	4.9/10	7.5/10
HobbyConsolas	N/A	82%
IGN	3.0/10	3.5/10
N64 Magazine	9%	N/A
Next Generation	N/A	1/5
Superjuegos	N/A	90/100
Super Game Power	5/5	5/5
Ação Games	9/10	9/10
Game Play 64	70%	N/A
Game X	31/40	31/40
Nintendo Acción	77%	N/A
PSX Magazine	N/A	7/10
Nintendo Magazine	86%	N/A
Gamers (Brasil)	N/A	3.7/5.0
Consolemania	79%	N/A

Mortal Kombat Mythologies: Sub-Zero received divisive reviews. IGN stated "it may have been a good idea on paper, but as a game it's terrible." and Next Generation concluded that "Despite a few good features, like the game's RPG elements, Mythologies just isn't any fun. After fighting several cookie-cutter enemies and getting killed in unpredictable traps, even the most hard-core Mortal Kombat fans will find themselves frustrated and angry." On the other side, GameSpot's Jeff Gerstmann hailed it as "a pretty amazing meld of fighting and platform jumping". Spanish magazine Superjuegos focused praise on the game's blend of genres, and called it "una auténtica delicia que sorprende tanto a los aficionados a los beat-em-up como a los maniacos de las adventuras estilla Flashback." ("a true delight that will surprise beat 'em up fans as much as Flashback-style adventure maniacs.") GamePro took a more moderate but still positive stance, describing it as "an interesting, entertaining, and ultimately exhausting spinoff of the arcade fighting series. Mythologies isn't as big as Castlevania: Symphony of the Night or as complex as Oddworld: Abe's Oddysee, but for solid and challenging action, it holds its own nicely."

Praises for the game centered on its system of accumulating experience points to learn moves, the graphics (in particular the 3D backgrounds), and the full motion video (FMV) cutscenes. However, many found the animation stiff to the point of appearing ridiculous. Some also criticized that there is not enough variety in the enemies, and that the level design and camera often create situations where the player cannot see the platform they need to jump on to proceed, forcing them to jump blindly and hope for the best. By far the most widespread criticism was the unintuitive and slow-to-respond controls, with some particularly complaining at the need to push an action button to make Sub-Zero turn around. John Ricciardi commented in Electronic Gaming Monthly, "Do you remember the old days of the NES when some games were entirely frustrating because of their horrible control? Well take the worst of the bunch, multiply it by 10, and you have MKM: SZ. The control is really that bad."

Reviews for the Nintendo 64 version were considerably more negative than those for the PlayStation version, as even critics who had a positive response to the game noted the Nintendo 64 version had lower quality audio and stripped out the FMV cutscenes, which many considered the best element of the game. GameFan and GameSpot also found the Nintendo 64 version's graphics more washed out, but IGN said the two versions are graphically identical apart from the removal of the FMV, and Electronic Gaming Monthly and GamePro both contended that the Nintendo 64 graphics are better. However, GamePro was overall less pleased with the Nintendo 64 version, describing it as more of a rental, and even Sushi-X, the only member of Electronic Gaming Monthly's four-person review team to give the PlayStation game a positive review, summed up that "While I somewhat enjoyed the PlayStation version, I detested the N64 mockery." He gave the PlayStation version a 7.5 but the Nintendo 64 version a 5.0. French magazine Game Play 64 had mixed opinions but believed that fans of the franchise should still find some enjoyment in it. Brazilian magazine Ação Games gave a score of 9 out of 10 for both N64 and PS1 versions, praising the graphics, sound, and gameplay.

Retrospective reviews were more negative, with some labeling the game as one of the worst Mortal Kombat games ever. Game Informer's feature "Replay" declared the game was "absolutely terrible" because of all of its aspects. In 2011, IGN's Daemon Hatfield listed it as one of the worst Mortal Kombat games of all time. According to him, Midway had planned Mythologies as a series but the overwhelmingly negative reception resulted in its cancellation. Its cutscenes have also been criticized in UGO Networks' article "The Worst Cutscenes In Gaming History" based on their unconvincing acting and special effects. GamesRadar's Mikel Reparaz opined that while the concept of giving Sub-Zero his own game was interesting based on his popularity, the game "ended up a terrible mess of ugly sprites, cheap deaths and a button you had to hit just to change the direction you were facing, and the less that's said about it, the better."

== See also ==
- Death by Degrees, a spinoff of the Tekken series with a similar premise
- List of video games notable for negative reception
