= Mortal Kombat 4 =

1997 video game

- Cover art for the home versions
- Developer: Midway (Note: Nintendo 64, PlayStation, and Windows versions developed by Eurocom; Game Boy Color version developed by Digital Eclipse.)
- Publishers: Midway: Nintendo 64, PlayStation; NA: Midway Home Entertainment; EU: GT Interactive Software
- Designers: Ed Boon; John Tobias
- Programmer: Ed Boon
- Artists: John Tobias; David Lee Michicich
- Composer: Dan Forden
- Series: Mortal Kombat
- Platform: Arcade: Nintendo 64, PlayStation, Windows, Game Boy Color
- Release: September 11, 1997: Arcade; NA: September 11, 1997; EU: 1997 Nintendo 64, PlayStation; NA: June 23, 1998; EU: September 15, 1998 Windows; NA: June 30, 1998; EU: September 15, 1998 Game Boy Color; NA: December 10, 1998; EU: 1999
- Genre: Fighting
- Modes: Single-player, multiplayer
- Arcade system: Midway Zeus

Mortal Kombat 4 is a 1997 fighting game developed and published by Midway for arcades. It is the fourth main installment in the Mortal Kombat franchise, and a sequel to 1995's Mortal Kombat 3. It is also the first title in the series to use 3D computer graphics, as well as the last in the series to have an arcade release. The game was ported to the PlayStation, Nintendo 64, Microsoft Windows, and Game Boy Color in 1998, followed by an updated version, titled Mortal Kombat Gold, for the Dreamcast in 1999.

The gameplay system in Mortal Kombat 4 is similar to that of the previous games; one of the most notable additions is the use of weapons and objects during fights. The storyline chronicles the attack from the corrupted Elder God Shinnok against his former comrades who trapped him in the Netherealm many years prior to the beginning of the series. The other 17 playable characters take part in the battle between good and evil, with the forces of light trying to stop Shinnok and the forces of darkness from conquering all the realms.

While developing the game, the Midway staff had problems rendering the graphics as it was one of the first 3D fighting games they developed. Co-creator Ed Boon stated that the staff wanted to make Mortal Kombat 4 more violent than its predecessors, removing the comical finishing moves featured in them. Since its release, the game received generally positive response from critics, with the exception of the Game Boy Color port.

== Gameplay ==
A screenshot from the game showing the newly implemented weapon system in a fight between Quan Chi and Reptile

Mortal Kombat 4 is played in a similar way to the previous titles from the series; the run button and combos are still used, and despite the 3D graphics, characters are restricted to a 2D path except for sidestepping. MK4 introduces a limited weapon system, allowing each character to take out a special weapon using a set button combination. Once equipped, the weapons are primarily used through the punch buttons. This includes swinging, clubbing or even tossing the weapons. The weapons can also be purposely dropped, in similar fashion to arena objects such as severed heads and rocks, another addition to the series. If an opponent's weapon is dropped, the other character is able to pick it up and use it.

MK4 added a "Maximum Damage" cap to the game's combo system, automatically breaking combos if they deal over a set amount of damage to a player and, thus, preventing infinite combos (although this cap can be removed with a code). Unlike Mortal Kombat Trilogy which contained multiple finishing moves of various kinds, Mortal Kombat 4 has the standard two Fatalities per character, in addition to two Stage Fatalities that can only be done in certain arenas and involve the winning character throwing their opponent into a part of the arena where they are killed. Unlike the first three games, this game does not include non-playable boss characters, except for Goro in the home versions.

== Plot ==
Millennia before the setting of the first game, Shinnok, one of the Elder Gods who control the six realms in the Mortal Kombat universe, attempted to become the conqueror of them all. The thunder god Raiden fought and defeated Shinnok in a war that spanned centuries, sending him to the Netherrealm, where he would be trapped forever. Now, Shinnok has managed to escape from the Netherrealm with help from the sorcerer Quan Chi, and seeks vengeance against the Elder Gods who banished him. In his plan, he first conquers the realm of Edenia with the aid of a traitor, Tanya, while preparing to attack the Elder Gods. In order to stop Shinnok's menace, Raiden requests help from the Earthrealm warriors who saved the realms from Emperor Shao Kahn in previous titles.

== Characters ==
Character selection screen of Mortal Kombat 4

The game includes 15 playable characters, with additional secret characters. The following is a list of the characters included in the Mortal Kombat 4 character selection roster.

New characters:

- Fujin — Raiden's ally, the Wind God who first appeared in Mortal Kombat Mythologies: Sub-Zero.
- Jarek — The last member of the Black Dragon after Kano's supposed death.
- Kai — A Shaolin monk and friend of Liu Kang.
- Quan Chi — The mysterious evil sorcerer who aided Shinnok in his escape from the Netherrealm. Quan Chi had previously appeared in Mortal Kombat Mythologies: Sub-Zero and the animated series Mortal Kombat: Defenders of the Realm. This game marks his first playable appearance in the series.
- Reiko — An Outworld assassin and Shinnok's general.
- Shinnok — A fallen Elder God. Shinnok appears both as a playable character and the final boss of this game, after originally appearing in Mortal Kombat Mythologies: Sub-Zero, also as the final boss.
- Tanya — A traitor to Edenia.

Returning characters:

- Goro — The Shokan and former tournament champion who returns as a sub-boss in home versions, reprising his original role in the first game.
- Jax — A U.S. Special Forces officer who goes after Jarek when he finds out that he is still alive.
- Johnny Cage — The revived Hollywood movie star seeking to produce his next movie.
- Liu Kang — A Shaolin monk and a Mortal Kombat Champion who seeks to defeat Shinnok.
- Noob Saibot (secret character) — The undead servant of Quan Chi.
- Raiden — The thunder god who again guides the mortals.
- Reptile — A Zaterran warrior who seeks to serve Shinnok to save his realm.
- Scorpion — An undead ninja who again seeks revenge on his nemeses Sub-Zero and Quan Chi for the massacre of his clan.
- Sonya Blade — A Special Forces lieutenant who seeks to arrest Jarek.
- Sub-Zero — A former Lin Kuei member again stalked by Scorpion.

In addition, the game includes a hidden character and skin, Meat, that turns the player's character into a bloody and fleshy skeleton. The game also introduces alternate costumes, as opposed to the palette swaps in previous installments. Mortal Kombat Gold features five additional characters and one more secret character.

== Development ==
Ed Boon, co-creator of the series, found it difficult to lead the development team for Mortal Kombat 4 due to the considerable increase in staff since the release of first Mortal Kombat title, with him as the only programmer. Therefore, Todd Allen and Mike Boon (Ed's younger brother) joined as programmers. The Midway staff wanted to remove the comical elements from the previous Mortal Kombat titles, so they focused on making Fatalities. On the other hand, the Animality finishing moves from Mortal Kombat 3 were removed since the transformation of a character into an animal was considered to be difficult to make in 3D graphics. In order to make the Fatalities more entertaining, they decided to make some of the Fatalities replay from different camera angles. Since actors were no longer needed to make the characters' movements with the exception of adding some motion capture elements, the staff found it easier to make Fatalities, as it was all done by computer animation. Some members of the development team had previously worked on War Gods, Midway's first 3D fighting game. However, they abandoned the "digital skin" technique used in that game, since the new Zeus hardware allowed them to create characters with enough polygons that digital skin would offer little benefit; Zeus could generate up to 1.2 million polygons per second.

The gameplay was planned to be similar to the predecessors although this would be the first game from the series to be made in 3D. As Ed Boon was skeptical about the quality of the result noting that the gameplay would be slower than previous titles, he decided to hand-animate frames with timings in a similar fashion to Street Fighter EX. Several people, including Boon and Richard DiVizio, performed fighting moves to serve as the basis for the animation.

To advertise the game, Midway organized a 35-stop road tour of the United States. The version of the game shown in the tour had nine characters, and within these nine was Noob Saibot, who would become a hidden character in the console ports only. Art director Tony Goskie created a 3D model used when any character in the game got skinned, which he called "Meat". It was later decided to make Meat a secret playable character. Players first learned of the character's given name after the text "Meat lives!" was placed on Ed Boon's website promoting Mortal Kombat 4's third arcade revision. Years after the game's release, Ed Boon commented that he and the staff should not have made Shinnok the final boss from the game as previous titles used enormous characters as bosses. The team opted to use an EPROM instead of a hard drive for the arcade hardware, due to the lower cost, and because it would allow the fast access time needed for familiar Mortal Kombat features such as changing backgrounds in mid-fight.

== Release ==
The arcade version of Mortal Kombat 4 was released in September 1997 in North America and later that same year in Europe. The game was ported to the PlayStation, Nintendo 64 and Microsoft Windows. A Sega Saturn version was considered, but Midway felt a Sega Saturn port would not sell enough to justify the port. An upgraded version titled Mortal Kombat Gold was also released exclusively for the Dreamcast. A Game Boy Color game based on Mortal Kombat 4 was released as well.

=== Home consoles ===
Eurocom, which had previously developed the Sega Saturn version of Ultimate Mortal Kombat 3, was in charge of making the console versions of the game. They worked for roughly eight months to finish the Nintendo 64 port. One of their main objectives was to have the game run at a consistent 60 frames per second. While all the traits from the arcade mode were added to the home version, Eurocom had to reduce the polygon count due to the more limited resources of the Nintendo 64. Eurocom was also assisted by Ed Boon and the lead artist on the arcade game, Dave Michicich. The port adds the Ice Pit, a snowy environment where players fight in an icy, carved-out pit. Another new feature added to these ports is a second set of alternate outfits for all characters. The arcade version provided only one set of alternate outfits which the player could unlock. The PC and PlayStation versions run FMV intro, bios and endings. The Nintendo 64 version, being a cartridge game, uses the in-game character animations to run them just like its arcade counterpart. The two platforms that offer FMV endings have a different ending for Reiko in which he goes into a portal leading to Shao Kahn's throne room, sits on the throne and has Shao Kahn's helmet come down onto him. In the other platforms, the ending fades to black after Reiko enters the portal.

=== Mortal Kombat Gold ===
An expanded version titled Mortal Kombat Gold was developed by Eurocom and released in 1999 as a launch title for the Dreamcast in both regions, on September 9 on North America and on October 14 in Europe. The game contains several additional characters (Baraka, Cyrax, Kitana, Mileena, Kung Lao and hidden Sektor) and stages, as well as a new weapon select mechanism.

=== Game Boy Color ===
The Game Boy Color version of MK4 was developed by Digital Eclipse and released by Midway. It is in 2D instead of the others' 3D. It features nine selectable characters: Raiden, Quan Chi, Fujin, Liu Kang, Sub-Zero, Reiko, Tanya, Scorpion, and the hidden character Reptile; Shinnok is still the final opponent. In addition, there are a few speech clips, and instead of using the in-game graphics for the Fatalities, the game uses short FMV clips. The Game Boy Color port's 2D engine reuses the game engine used in the Game Boy port of MK3, including the same character select screen, "Choose Your Destiny" screen, and how the characters move and interact. The background music was replaced with repetitive songs that bore instrumentation befitting a Game Boy release, and the port does not contain any blood outside of the Fatality videos. The combo system and weapons were also removed.

== Reception ==
Reception

Aggregate score
| Aggregator | Score |
|---|---|
| GameRankings | N64: 76% (20 reviews); PS: 76% (16 reviews); PC: 72% (14 reviews) |

Review scores
| Publication | Score |
|---|---|
| GameRevolution | B (PS) |
| GameSpot | 8.9/10 (N64); 8.6/10 (PS); 8.3/10 (PC); 3.5/10 (GBC) |
| IGN | 8.8/10 (N64); 8.0/10 (PS); 8.0/10 (PC); 4.0/10 (GBC) |
| Next Generation | 3/5 (arcade); 3/5 (N64); 2/5 (PS) |
| PC Gamer (UK) | 66% |
| PlayStation: The Official Magazine | 5/10 |
| SuperGamePower | 4.5/5 (N64) |
| Total Game Boy | 51% (GBC) |

Upon the start of the arcade's road tour, news programs commented on the violence from the game and expressed concern on how it would affect the players' personalities; Ed Boon replied that there were already games more violent than Mortal Kombat 4, which was only the most popular of the violent games and therefore the most prominent.

In reviews for the arcade version, Next Generation and GamePro both noted that while the graphics are in 3D, the gameplay is in the same 2D format as previous installments. Both also opined that the game had sharp graphics and a pleasing blend of old characters with strong newcomers. Next Generation called it "a fast-moving, dark, and disturbing fighter that retains many of the series' best qualities." The reviewer felt the lack of genuine innovation was a major strike against it, but concluded, "It may not be what we'd hoped for, but it's much better than War Gods." GamePro had other misgivings, noting that version 1.0 has a number of bugs, includes only a handful of fatalities, and controls less responsively than previous games in the series. However, they found the weapons system, new characters, and foreboding music make it fresh enough to be worth playing. They gave a more unreservedly positive review to version 2.0, stating that it added true 3D movement and corrected the control issues, though the camera still had occasional problems and certain moves were too hard to block.

GameRankings had an average of 76.07% from 20 reviews for the Nintendo 64 version of the game, 75.75% with 16 reviews for the PlayStation version, and 72.14% with 14 reviews for the PC version. Although various reviewers did not find it more entertaining than previous games, they still praised the gameplay. On the other hand, the gameplay was said to be very similar to the previous Mortal Kombat titles. The PlayStation and PC ports have been said to have improvements over the arcade game such as having more responsive controls and the exclusive FMV scenes. However, IGN mentioned that playing the PC port would become "stale" unless the player "had an extra pad and a friend" and the Official UK PlayStation Magazine said that the game was "the same old stuff trotted out with a fresh coat of pixels. Tedious."

The Nintendo 64 port received positive response for being faithful to the arcade version, with GameSpot giving it a "Great" 8.9 and IGN a "Great" 8.8, though they noted that the graphics were not as good as those of the arcade. The game has received positive response due to the new 3D graphics, the improvement of combos, and how all the characters "are still as cheesy as ever" and because they still have their original movements with a few updates.

Next Generation reviewed the Nintendo 64 version of the game, rating it three stars out of five, and stated that "Mortal Kombat 4 is a guilty pleasure; although it's unoriginal, the game is fast and rewarding. MK4 is an excellent port and, though it's average in general, it is still one of the best fighters for the console."

Next Generation reviewed the PlayStation version of the game, rating it two stars out of five, and stated that "Overall, MK4 is by no means incompetent, and it's a fine port of the arcade game. Had it not been released on a system teeming with great fighting games, it might stand a chance, but on PlayStation, there's little to distinguish it."

The Game Boy Color version received poor reviews from publications such as GameSpot, whose editor Jeff Gerstmann gave it a 3.5 out of 10 due to how different the game is from the other ports and how unresponsive the controls are. Similarly IGN's Peer Schneider criticized how limited the gameplay had become in this version and how defeating the opponent was easier. He gave the game a "Poor" 4.0 out of 10.

In retrospective, GamesRadar criticized the endings for the Nintendo 64 version of the game using a compilation from them for an April Fools joke, labelling them as hilarious due to their poor quality. Mortal Kombat 4 was ranked as having the third best Game Over screen of all time by GamePro in 2009. According to a summary in to the series' retrospective by IGN, "With interest in ultraviolence waning, 3D becoming commonplace, and the photorealism now gone, Mortal Kombat 4 was unable to replicate the success of its predecessors." In 2020 CBR positively reviewed the game praising it for introducing "weapon styles" that would be featured in future games and stated that the game is "still an integral part of the franchise's history".
