= 2012 in video games =

Numerous video games were released in 2012. Many awards went to games such as Madden NFL 13, NBA 2K13, WWE '13, Borderlands 2, Far Cry 3, Journey, Mass Effect 3, Dishonored, The Walking Dead, and XCOM: Enemy Unknown. The year began with the worldwide release of Sony's handheld game console, the PlayStation Vita, originally launched in Japan in December 2011. The end of the year marked the worldwide release of Nintendo's home game console, the Wii U.

Series with new installments in 2012 include Alan Wake, Animal Crossing, Assassin's Creed, Borderlands, Call of Duty, Counter-Strike, Darksiders, Dead or Alive, Diablo, Fable, Far Cry, Forza Motorsport, Guild Wars, Halo, Hitman, Mario Party, Marvel vs. Capcom, Mass Effect, Max Payne, Medal of Honor, Modern Combat, Need for Speed, Ninja Gaiden, PlanetSide, Pokémon, Prototype, Resident Evil, Silent Hill, Sniper Elite, Spec Ops, Super Mario, Tekken, The Darkness, Tom Clancy's Ghost Recon, Transformers, Trials, X-COM and Yakuza.

In addition, 2012 saw the introduction of several new properties, including Asura's Wrath, Dishonored, Gravity Rush, Journey, Lollipop Chainsaw, Sleeping Dogs and Forza Horizon.

== Highest-grossing games ==
The following were 2012's top ten highest-grossing video games in terms of worldwide revenue (including physical sales, digital purchases, subscriptions, microtransactions, free-to-play and pay-to-play) across all platforms (including mobile, PC and console platforms).

| No. | Game | Revenue | Publisher(s) | Genre | Platform(s) | Business model | Ref. |
|---|---|---|---|---|---|---|---|
| 1 | Call of Duty: Black Ops II | $1,000,000,000 | Activision (Activision Blizzard) | FPS | Console | Buy-to-play | |
| 1 | Crossfire | $1,000,000,000 | Smilegate / Tencent | FPS | PC | Free-to-play | |
| 3 | World of Warcraft | $986,000,000 | Blizzard Entertainment (Activision Blizzard) | MMORPG | PC | Subscription | |
| 4 | FIFA 13 | $444,000,000 | EA Sports (Electronic Arts) | Sports | Console, Mobile | Buy-to-play | |
| 5 | Borderlands 2 | $300,000,000 | 2K Games (Take-Two Interactive) | Action RPG | Console, PC | Buy-to-play | |
| 6 | World of Tanks | $280,000,000 | Wargaming.net | Vehicular combat | PC | Free-to-play | |
| 7 | Pokémon Black 2 / White 2 | $267,000,000 | Nintendo / The Pokémon Company | RPG | Console | Buy-to-play | |
| 8 | New Super Mario Bros. 2 | $238,000,000 | Nintendo | Platformer | Console | Buy-to-play | |
| 9 | Minecraft | $237,000,000 | Mojang | Sandbox | PC, Console | Buy-to-play | |
| 10 | League of Legends | $200,000,000 | Riot Games / Tencent | MOBA | PC | Free-to-play | |

== Top-rated games ==
=== Critically acclaimed games ===
Metacritic (MC) and GameRankings (GR) are aggregators of video game journalism reviews.

2012 games and expansions scoring at least 90/100 (MC) or 90% (GR)
| Game | Publisher | Release Date | Platform | MC score | GR score |
|---|---|---|---|---|---|
| The Walking Dead: Episode 5 – No Time Left | Telltale Games | November 21, 2012 | WIN | 89/100 | 94.75% |
| Persona 4 Golden | Atlus | June 14, 2012 | PSV | 93/100 | 94.16% |
| The Walking Dead: A Telltale Games Series | Telltale Games | November 21, 2012 | PS3 | 94/100 | 92.5% |
| Mark of the Ninja | Microsoft Studios | October 16, 2012 | WIN | 91/100 | 93.33% |
| Super Hexagon | Terry Cavanagh | November 27, 2012 | WIN | 88/100 | 93.33% |
| The Walking Dead: A Telltale Games Series | Telltale Games | November 21, 2012 | WIN | 89/100 | 93.2% |
| Mass Effect 3 | Electronic Arts | March 6, 2012 | X360 | 93/100 | 92.17% |
| Cave Story | Nicalis | October 4, 2012 | 3DS | 93/100 | 92% |
| Mass Effect 3 | Electronic Arts | March 6, 2012 | PS3 | 93/100 | 91.65% |
| Journey | Sony Computer Entertainment | March 13, 2012 | PS3 | 92/100 | 92.56% |
| Fire Emblem Awakening | Nintendo | April 19, 2012 | 3DS | 92/100 | 92.52% |
| The Walking Dead: A Telltale Games Series | Telltale Games | November 21, 2012 | X360 | 92/100 | 91.8% |
| Trials Evolution | Microsoft Studios | April 18, 2012 | X360 | 90/100 | 91.52% |
| Dishonored | Bethesda Softworks | October 9, 2012 | WIN | 91/100 | 90.57% |
| Borderlands 2 | 2K | September 18, 2012 | PS3 | 91/100 | 90.48% |
| NBA 2K13 | 2K | October 2, 2012 | WIN | 90/100 | 91% |
| Far Cry 3 | Ubisoft | December 4, 2012 | X360 | 91/100 | 89.14% |
| Mark of the Ninja | Microsoft Studios | October 16, 2012 | WIN | 90/100 | 90.43% |
| Ōkami HD | Capcom | October 30, 2012 | PS3 | 90/100 | 90.29% |
| Borderlands 2 | 2K | September 18, 2012 | WIN | 89/100 | 90.1% |
| Guild Wars 2 | NCsoft | August 28, 2012 | WIN | 90/100 | 90.02% |
| NBA 2K13 | 2K | October 2, 2012 | PS3 | 90/100 | 89.68% |
| FIFA 13 | EA Sports | September 25, 2012 | X360 | 90/100 | 89.47% |
| Far Cry 3 | Ubisoft | December 4, 2012 | PS3 | 90/100 | 89.18% |
| Dark Souls: Artorias of the Abyss | Namco Bandai Games | October 23, 2012 | X360 | 89/100 | 90% |
| XCOM: Enemy Unknown | 2K | October 8, 2012 | X360 | 90/100 | 88.96% |
| The Lord of the Rings Online: Riders of Rohan | Turbine, Inc. | October 15, 2012 | WIN | 88/100 | 90% |

=== Major awards ===
| Category/Organization | | 30th Golden Joystick Awards October 26, 2012 | VGA December 7, 2012 | | 16th Annual D.I.C.E. Awards February 7, 2013 | | 9th British Academy Games Awards March 5, 2013 | 13th Game Developers Choice Awards March 27, 2014 |
|---|---|---|---|---|---|---|---|---|
| Game of the Year | | The Elder Scrolls V: Skyrim | The Walking Dead | | Journey | | Dishonored | Journey |
| Independent / Debut (Note: Certain award presentations combine these categories.) | | —N/a | Journey | | —N/a | | The Unfinished Swan | FTL: Faster Than Light |
| Downloadable | | Minecraft | The Walking Dead | | | | —N/a | Journey |
| Mobile/Handheld | Mobile | Angry Birds Space | Sound Shapes | | Hero Academy | | The Walking Dead | The Room |
| Mobile/Handheld | Handheld | Uncharted: Golden Abyss | Sound Shapes | | Paper Mario: Sticker Star | | The Walking Dead | The Room |
| Innovation | | —N/a | | | Journey | | The Unfinished Swan | Journey |
| Artistic Achievement or Graphics | Animation | —N/a | Halo 4 | | Assassin's Creed III | | Journey | |
| Artistic Achievement or Graphics | Art Direction | —N/a | Halo 4 | | Journey | | Journey | |
| Audio | Music | —N/a | Journey | | | | | Journey |
| Audio | Sound Design | —N/a | —N/a | | Journey | | | Journey |
| Character or Performance | Actor | —N/a | Dameon Clarke as Handsome Jack; Borderlands 2 | Claptrap; Borderlands 2 | Lee Everett; The Walking Dead | | Danny Wallace as the Narrator; Thomas Was Alone | —N/a |
| Character or Performance | Actress | —N/a | Melissa Hutchison as Clementine; The Walking Dead | Claptrap; Borderlands 2 | Lee Everett; The Walking Dead | | Danny Wallace as the Narrator; Thomas Was Alone | —N/a |
| Game Direction or Design | | —N/a | | | Journey | | | |
| Narrative | | —N/a | | | The Walking Dead | | | |
| Technical Achievement | Gameplay Engineering | —N/a | | | XCOM: Enemy Unknown | | —N/a | Far Cry 3 |
| Technical Achievement | Visual Engineering | —N/a | | | Halo 4 | | —N/a | Far Cry 3 |
| Multiplayer/Online | Online Gameplay | —N/a | Borderlands 2 | | Journey | | Journey | —N/a |
| Multiplayer/Online | Connectivity | —N/a | Borderlands 2 | | Halo 4 | | Journey | —N/a |
| Action/Adventure | Action/Shooter | Battlefield 3 | Borderlands 2 | | | | Far Cry 3 | —N/a |
| Action/Adventure | Adventure | Batman: Arkham City | Dishonored | | The Walking Dead | | Far Cry 3 | —N/a |
| Casual or Family | Casual | —N/a | | | Journey | | Lego Batman 2: DC Super Heroes | —N/a |
| Casual or Family | Family | —N/a | | | Skylanders: Giants | | Lego Batman 2: DC Super Heroes | —N/a |
| Fighting | | Mortal Kombat Komplete Edition | Persona 4 Arena | | PlayStation All-Stars Battle Royale | | —N/a | —N/a |
| Role-Playing | | The Elder Scrolls V: Skyrim | Mass Effect 3 | | | | —N/a | —N/a |
| Social or Web-Based | | —N/a | You Don't Know Jack | | SimCity Social | | SongPop | —N/a |
| Sports | Individual | FIFA 12 | SSX | | FIFA 13 | | New Star Soccer | —N/a |
| Sports | Team | FIFA 12 | NBA 2K13 | | FIFA 13 | | New Star Soccer | —N/a |
| Racing | | Forza Motorsport 4 | Need for Speed: Most Wanted | | | | —N/a | —N/a |
| Strategy/Simulation | | Civilization V: Gods & Kings | —N/a | | XCOM: Enemy Unknown | | | —N/a |
| Special Award | | Outstanding Contribution | Best Game of the Decade | | Hall of Fame | Pioneer Awards | BAFTA Fellowship | Lifetime Achievement Award |
| Special Award | | FIFA (Electronic Arts) | Half-Life 2 | | Gabe Newell | Marc Blank, Dave Lebling | Gabe Newell | Ray Muzyka and Greg Zeschuk |

== Major events ==
| Date | Event | Ref. |
|---|---|---|
| February 3–29 | Sega reduces western business after the release of Binary Domain, and focuses on digital on PC and Mobile | |
| March 5–9 | Game Developers Conference 2012 held in San Francisco, California. | |
| April 6–8 | PAX East 2012 held in Boston Convention and Exhibition Center. | |
| April 27 | The Kirby franchise celebrated its 20th anniversary in Japan. | |
| May 2–5 | Korean e-Sports Association, Ongamenet, Blizzard Entertainment and GOM TV announced the introduction of StarCraft II: Wings of Liberty to professional competitions in South Korea with StarCraft: Brood War being completely phased out in October. | |
| June 5–7 | E3 2012 at the Los Angeles Convention Center. | |
| July 13 | The Metal Gear franchise celebrated its 25th anniversary in Japan. | |
| August 2–5 | QuakeCon 2012: The massive annual LAN party held in Dallas, Texas. | |
| August 15–19 | Gamescom 2012 held in Cologne, Germany. | |
| August 30 | The Street Fighter franchise celebrated its 25th anniversary in Japan. | |
| September 20–23 | Tokyo Game Show 2012 held in Chiba, Japan. | |
| September 26–29 | Eurogamer Expo 2012 held in Earls Court, London. | |
| October 24 | Polygon is launched. | |
| November 6 | The Ratchet & Clank franchise celebrated its 10th anniversary in North America. | |
| December 7–9 | Spike Video Game Awards | |
| December 17 | The Mega Man franchise celebrated its 25th anniversary in Japan. | |

== Notable deaths ==
- January 13 - Bill 'Phosphorus' Sears, 58, Developer at GameHouse and co-founder of Digital Eel
- February 16 - Michael Kuehl, 32, developer at Insomniac Games
- February 19 - Steve Kordek, 100, Inventor and Pinball innovator
- April 8 - Jack Tramiel, 83, founder of Commadore International
- July 16 - Christian Oberth, 59, Developer of Anteater, Ardy the Aardvark and Rescue
- August 11 - Paul Steed, 47, Art and Animation for Quake, Quake III and Wing Commander III
- September 3 – Michael Clarke Duncan, 54, actor (Balrog in Street Fighter: The Legend of Chun-Li, Benjamin King in Saints Row, Wardog in SOCOM II: U.S. Navy SEALs, Atlas in God of War II)
- September 11 – Ian Abercrombie, 77, actor (Palpatine in Star Wars: The Clone Wars – Lightsaber Duels and Star Wars: The Clone Wars – Republic Heroes, Alexander Mayhew in James Bond 007: Nightfire)
- October 10 - Mike Singleton, 61, British game developer and creator of The Lords of Midnight
- December 3 - Christopher Erhardt, 53, Developer and DigiPen's professor of Game Design and Production

== Hardware releases ==
The list of game consoles released in 2012. This year saw the launch of the first home console in the 8th generation of gaming, the Wii U.

The PlayStation Vita made its launch in North America & Europe after initially releasing in Japan the previous year. Nintendo also released the first model revision to the Nintendo 3DS this year, the Nintendo 3DS XL.

Two home console revisions also came out this year, the PlayStation 3 Super Slim and the Wii Mini (released only in Canada).

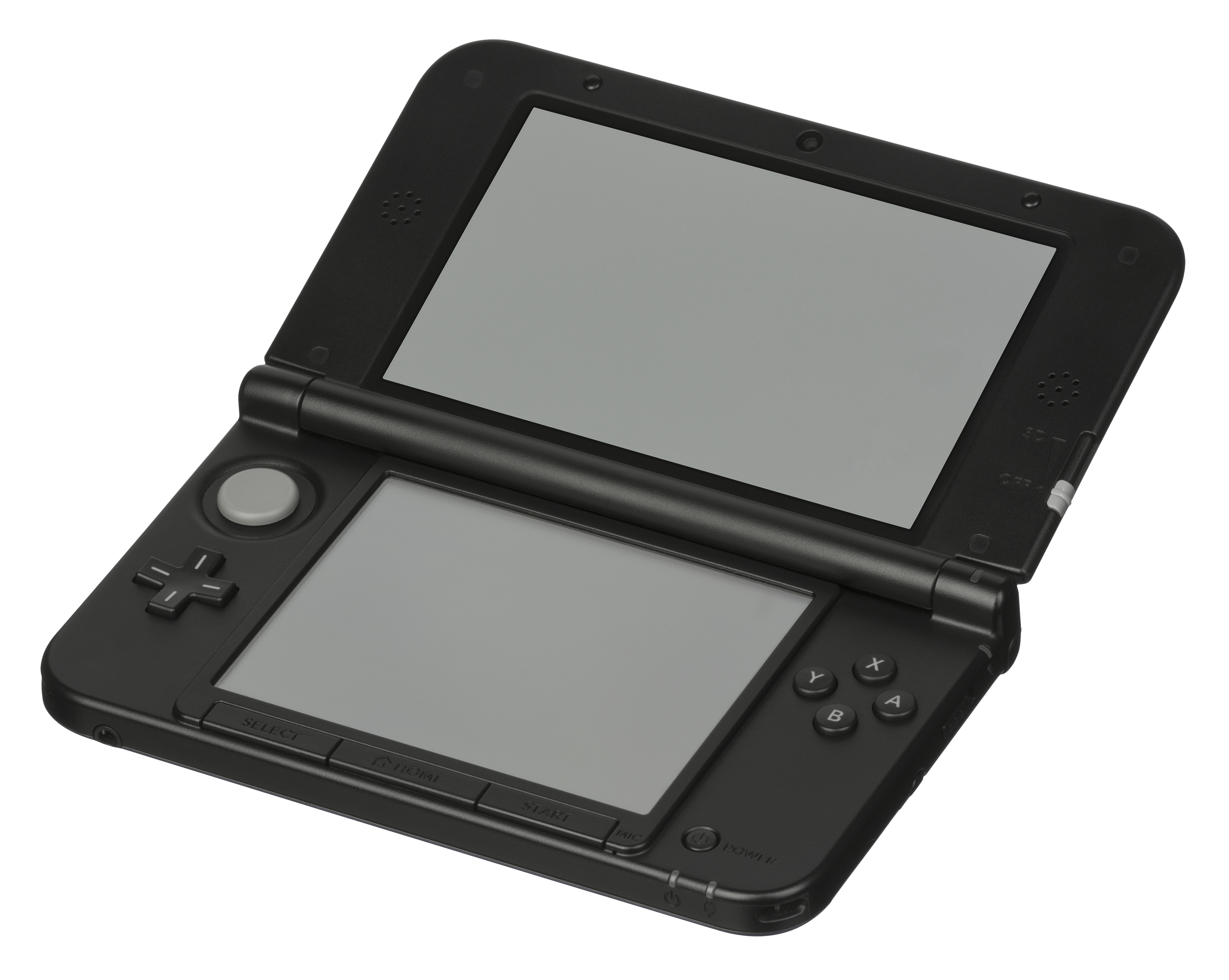
Nintendo 3DS XL

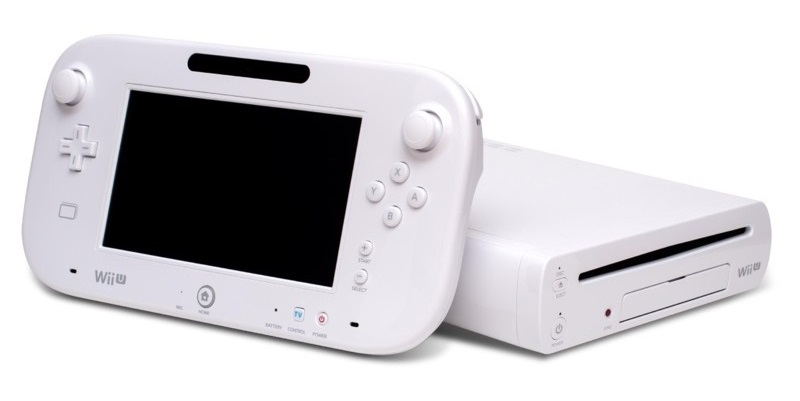
Wii U

| Date | Console | Ref. |
|---|---|---|
| February 15 | PlayStation Vita^{NA} | |
| February 22 | PlayStation Vita^{EU} | |
| July 28 | Nintendo 3DS XL^{JP/EU} | |
| August 19 | Nintendo 3DS XL^{NA} | |
| August 23 | Nintendo 3DS XL^{AU} | |
| September 25 | PlayStation 3 Super Slim | |
| November 18 | Wii U^{NA} | |
| November 30 | Wii U^{PAL} | |
| December 7 | Wii Mini^{CAN} | |
| December 8 | Wii U^{JP} | |
| December 18 | Neo Geo X | |

== Video game-based film and television releases ==
| Title | Date | Director | Distributor(s) | Franchise | Original game publisher | Ref. |
|---|---|---|---|---|---|---|
| Ace Attorney | February 11, 2012 | Takashi Miike | Toho | Ace Attorney | Capcom | |
| Video Game High School | May 11, 2012 | Matthew Arnold | RocketJump Studios | —N/a | —N/a | |
| Tron: Uprising | May 18, 2012 | Charlie Bean | Disney XD | Tron | —N/a | |
| Talking Friends | June 8, 2012 | Dylan Coburn | Disney.com | Talking Tom & Friends | Outfit7 | |
| Indie Game: The Movie | June 12, 2012 | James Swirsky | BlinkWorks Media | —N/a | —N/a | |
| Sword Art Online | July 8, 2012 | Tomohiko Itō | Tokyo MX (Japan) | —N/a | —N/a | |
| Kyurem vs. the Sword of Justice | July 14, 2012 | Kunihiko Yuyama | Toho | Pokémon | Game Freak | |
| Resident Evil: Retribution | September 3, 2012 | Paul W. S. Anderson | Sony Pictures Motion Picture Group | Resident Evil | Capcom | |
| Halo: Forward Unto Dawn | October 5, 2012 | Stewart Hendler | Machinima Prime; YouTube | Halo | Microsoft Game Studios | |
| Silent Hill: Revelation | October 26, 2012 | M. J. Bassett | Alliance Films (Canada) Metropolitan Filmexport (France) | Silent Hill | Konami | |
| Resident Evil: Damnation | October 27, 2012 | Makoto Kamiya | Sony Pictures Entertainment Japan | Resident Evil | Capcom | |
| Wreck-It Ralph | November 2, 2012 | Rich Moore | Walt Disney Studios Motion Pictures | Wreck-It Ralph | —N/a | |
| Mass Effect: Paragon Lost | November 29, 2012 | Atsushi Takeuchi | Funimation | Mass Effect | BioWare | |
| Minecraft: The Story of Mojang | December 22, 2012 | Paul Owens | 2 Player Productions | Minecraft | Mojang | |

== See also ==
- 2012 in esports
- 2012 in games
