= List of trackball arcade games =

This is a list of arcade games that have used a trackball to interact with the game.

- World Cup (Sega, March 1978)
- Atari Football (Atari, October 1978)
- Shuffleboard (Midway Manufacturing, October 1978)
- Atari Soccer (1979)
- Atari Baseball (1979)
- BullsEye (1980)
- Centipede (1980)
- Extra Bases (1980)
- Missile Command (1980)
- Kick (a.k.a. Kick Man) (1981)
- Laser Base (1981)
- Beezer (1982)
- Millipede (1982)
- Liberator (1982)
- Quantum (1982)
- Reactor (1982)
- Slither (1982)
- Birdie King (1982)
- Birdie King 2 (1983)
- Cloud 9 (1983)
- Crystal Castles (1983)
- Track and Field (1983; later versions used buttons)
- Wacko (1983)
- Birdie King 3 (1984)
- Cube Quest (1984)
- Goalie Ghost (1984)
- Bouncer (1984)
- Marble Madness (1984)
- Snake Pit (1984)
- Gimme A Break (1985)
- Tehkan Gridiron Fight (1985)
- Tehkan World Cup (1985)
- Mini Golf (1985)
- Big Event Golf (1986)
- Blades of Steel (1987)
- Combat School / Boot Camp (1987)
- Cabal (1988; trackball used only in early editions)
- Capcom Bowling (1988)
- Syvalion (1988)
- Ameri Darts (1989)
- Coors Light Bowling (1989)
- U.S. Classic (1989)
- Tri-Sports (1989)
- American Horseshoes (1990)
- Shuuz (1990)
- Strata Bowling (1990)
- Ataxx (1990)
- Rampart (1990)
- Golden Tee Golf (1990)
- Bowl-O-Rama (1991)
- Golden Tee Golf II (1992)
- SegaSonic The Hedgehog (1993)
- Golden Tee 3D Golf (1995)
- Shuffleshot (1997)
- World Class Bowling (1997)
- Outtrigger (video game) (1999)
- The Simpsons Bowling (2000)
- Beach head 2000 (2000)
- Golden Tee Fore! (2000)
- The Grid (2001)
- HyperBowl (Hyper Entertainment, 1999; uses a bowling ball sized trackball)
- Silver Strike Bowling (2004)
- Rockin' Bowl-O-Rama (2005)
- Golden Tee LIVE! (2005)
- Virtua Bowling (IGS)
- Target Toss Pro: Bags (2007)
- The Irritating Maze (1997)
- Super Monkey Ball - Ticket Blitz (2009)
- Marine Date (1981)
- Temple Run 2 (2014)
