= Chris Oberth =

American video game programmer (1953–2012)

- Born: May 17, 1953
- Died: July 16, 2012 (aged 59)
- Occupation: Video game programmer
- Notable work: Anteater; Ardy the Aardvark; Rescue
- Spouse: Mary Schmidt

Christian H. "Chris" Oberth (May 17, 1953 – July 16, 2012) was an American video game programmer who began writing games for the Apple II in the late 1970s. He developed handheld electronic games for Milton Bradley, arcade video games for Stern Electronics and other companies, and ported games to home computers and consoles.

Though not a hit in arcades, Oberth's 1982 Anteater, developed for Stern, was an influential concept that was cloned multiple times for home computers, including Oil's Well from Sierra On-Line and Diamond Mine. The following year, he created his own home version titled Ardy the Aardvark (Datamost, 1983). He also developed the twin-stick shooter Rescue (1982) and the maze game Armored Car (1981) for Stern.

Oberth's first commercial games, Phasor Zap (1978) and 3-D Docking Mission (1978) for the Apple II, were published by Programma International, a company that also published games from future arcade game designers Bob Flanagan and Gary Shannon, and rejected the first effort from Mark Turmell. His next 13 Apple II games, in addition to Phasor Zap and 3-D Docking Mission, were published by The Elektrik Keyboard, a musical instrument and computer store in Chicago, where Oberth was head of the computer department.

== Games ==
Programma International
- Phasor Zap
- 3-D Docking Mission

The Elektrik Keyboard 1978-79

- 3-D Docking Mission
- Cycle Jump
- Dart Room
- Deflectiom
- Demolition Derby
- Depth Charge
- Drawing Board
- Frustration
- Intercepter
- Kaleidoscope
- Moto-Cross
- Phasor Zap
- Recall
- RunAround
- Speed Racer

Milton Bradley 1979-80

- Light Fight
- Finger Bowl
- Sky-Writer
- Alfie

Stern Electronics 1981-83

- Anteater
- Minefield
- Rescue
- Tazzmania
- Armored Car

Datamost 1983

- Ardy the Aardvark (Atari 8-bit)
- Aardvark (Commodore 16 and C64)

Microlab 1984

- Boulder Dash (ColecoVision port)
- Dr. J and Larry Bird Go One on One (ColecoVision port)

Epyx 1985

- Winter Games

Mindscape 1987-88, 1990

- Indiana Jones and the Temple of Doom
- Out Run (C64 port)

Gametek 1992

- American Gladiators

Incredible Technologies 1995-1997

- Time Killers
- BloodStorm
- ShuffleShot
- World Class Bowling

Electronic Arts 2001

- NBA Live 2001

Unreleased

- Crypt (Stern, 1983)
- Days of Thunder (unpublished version)
- Power-Up Baseball (Incredible Technologies, Midway, 1996)
- Xcavator (Incredible Technologies, 1991)
