= Zotrix =

2015 video game

- Developer: ZeroBit Games
- Platforms: PlayStation 4, Windows
- Release: 2015: Windows; 2016: PS4
- Genre: Multidirectional shooter
- Mode: Single-player

Zotrix is a twin-stick shooter video game developed by Zero Bit games and released on Windows in 2015 and on PlayStation 4 in 2016. A sequel, Zotrix 2, was announced in 2016, but not released as of 2022.

== Reception ==
The game received mixed reviews upon release. Its PlayStation 4 version holds 56/100 on Metacritic based on 8 reviews. 4players.de gave it 76/100 stating "When it comes to dualstick shooters you don't have to ask me twice. Nonetheless Zotrix isn't love at first sight. But if you get used to the quirky arcady feel à la Galaga where positioning is as important as reflexes you might develop an interesting friendship."
