= Capcom Bowling =

1988 arcade game

- Developer: Strata
- Publisher: Capcom
- Designers: Elaine Ditton; Richard Ditton
- Artists: Tim Skelly; Richard Ditton
- Composer: David Thiel
- Platform: Arcade
- Release: August 10, 1988
- Genre: Sports
- Mode: Up to 4 players alternately

Capcom Bowling is a top down bowling sports simulation game developed by Incredible Technologies (under the brand name Strata) and released by Capcom to arcades in 1988. Up to 4 four players could play a single game playing alternately. The controls feature a trackball which is used to control both direction and power, and two buttons which control left and right spin or hook. Comedic animations play for making certain shots.

The game was released in both an upright cabinet and a cocktail version. Most of the upright cabinets are conversion kits for existing cabinets although a limited number of dedicated cabinets were produced. These cabinets featured a birch plywood finish to mimic a bowling lane, a larger marbled trackball and painted side art. The Japanese version featured a different cabinet.

An alternate version, Coors Light Bowling, was released the following year. This version features endorsement from the beer Coors Light. The title screen is completely different on this version and some of the animations were changed to add Coors Light references.

== Reception ==
In Japan, Game Machine listed Capcom Bowling on their October 1, 1988 issue as being the most-successful upright/cockpit arcade unit of the month. In North America, it was a commercial success, selling about 12,000 arcade units by early 1991.

Your Sinclair called the game "quite fun" but "a little quick and easy".

== Bowlingo ==
In 1990, Capcom entered the bowling industry with Bowlingo. It was a coin-operated, electro-mechanical, fully automated mini ten-pin bowling installation. It was smaller than a standard bowling alley, designed to be smaller and cheaper for amusement arcades. Bowlingo drew significant earnings in North America upon release in 1990. The game's success led to Capcom announcing up to 3,000 lanes to be built across Japan and the United States between 1991 and 1992.

== See also ==
- List of trackball arcade games
- Silver Strike Bowling
