= Star Worlds Arcade =

Arcade in DeKalb, Illinois, US

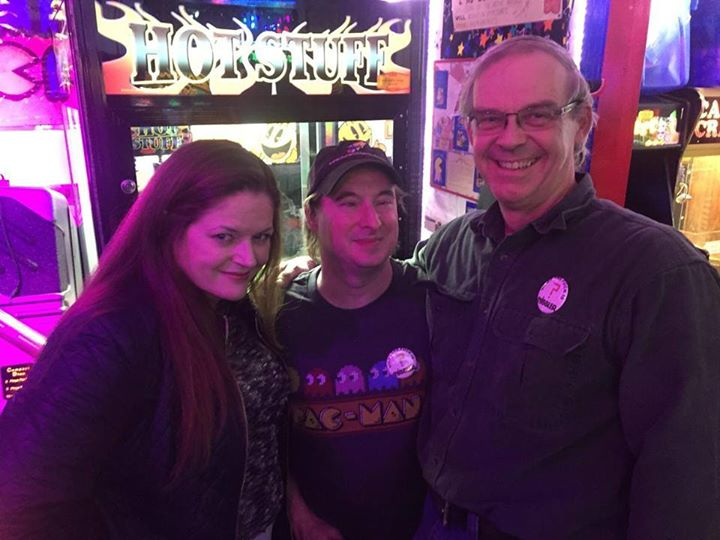
- Established: 1985
- Location: 1234 East Lincoln Highway; DeKalb, Illinois; United States
- Coordinates: 41.9259899117404°N 88.7381409325409°W
- Type: Arcade game
- Website: starworldsarcade.com

Star Worlds Arcade is an amusement arcade located in DeKalb, Illinois. The arcade held its grand opening on January 11, 1985, in Maple Park, Illinois, US, with only 18 arcade games. Today, with hundreds of games rotated regularly throughout its game rooms, Star Worlds can be found in DeKalb, Illinois, having moved in 2004 when owner and manager Patrick O'Malley and partner Glenn Thomas needed more space and more customers. Although it is predominantly a video game arcade with a couple of rooms dedicated solely to the Golden Age of Video Arcade Games, it is also a small museum exhibiting a wide variety of collectibles associated with arcade game iconography, home video game consoles and 1980s pop culture in general. Star Worlds was inducted into the Twin Galaxies International Registry of Historic Video Game Arcades by gaming celebrity Walter Day for being one of the last remaining neighborhood arcades still in operation since the 1980s.

== Original arcade game collection ==
Patrick O'Malley started the arcade as a personal collection of games in his parents' garage when he was still a teenager in Maple Park. But then he moved the games into a commercial retail space across town when he acquired the recently defunct Star Worlds chain of arcades (formerly located in Geneva, Illinois, and West Chicago, Illinois) from Tom Sofranski of Gerault Amusements. These first 18 games included:

- Q*bert
- Space Invaders
- Hangly-Man
- Asteroids
- Rapid Fire
- Wizard of Wor
- Sky Raiders
- Depth Charge
- Frogger
- Space Encounters
- Kangaroo
- Donkey Kong
- Stargate
- Pengo
- Le Mans
- Scramble
- Make Trax
- Pac-Man

Star Worlds Arcade and its owners are featured in a number of documentary films, including Star Worlds: A Pocket Full of Tokens and I'm Heading to the Arcade, Man vs Snake and Go Big.
