= Minefield (video game) =

1983 video game

- Arcade flyer
- Developer: Stern Electronics
- Publisher: Stern Electronics
- Designer: Chris Oberth
- Platform: Arcade
- Release: JP: June 1983
- Genre: Run and gun
- Modes: Single-player, multiplayer

Minefield is a 1983 run and gun video game developed and published by Stern Electronics for arcades. It was released in North America in June 1983. It was designed by Chris Oberth.

In 2023, Atari SA acquired the rights to twelve Stern Electronics video games including Minefield.

== Gameplay ==
The player controls a tank who must navigate minefields and defeat enemies. The tank can shoot enemies in front of, behind and above itself. Missiles with stronger firepower can be found and picked up near mines which kill the player. Each level ends when the player is rescued by two helicopters. The player occasionally meets a boss character, usually a military base, which must be defeated while the screen stops scrolling.
