= Incredible Technologies =

American video game and gambling machine company

Incredible Technologies (IT)
- Formerly: Free Radical Software (FRS) (1985-1987)
- Type: Private
- Industry: Video games and casino gaming technology
- Founded: 1985
- Founder: Elaine Hodgson, President & CEO; Richard Ditton, Executive Vice President
- Headquarters: Vernon Hills, Illinois, United States
- Products: Golden Tee Golf, Silver Strike Bowling, video game software/hardware, Magic Touch casino gaming
- Number of employees: 200 (2017)
- Website: itsgames.com

Incredible Technologies (IT), formerly Free Radical Software (FRS), is an American designer and manufacturer of coin-operated video games and Class III casino games, based in Vernon Hills, Illinois. The company's most widely used product is the Golden Tee Golf series. The company employs around 200 people at its offices in suburban Chicago.

== History ==
The firm was founded as Free Radical Software in July 1985 by Richard Ditton, a NASA software engineer, and Elaine Hodgson, a biochemist. The company was a software design gaming firm working for Semaphore Systems, developing the title Championship Wrestling for Epyx, and porting Winter Games to Commodore Amiga and Atari ST, before being renamed as Incredible Technologies. The company started in the basement of the owners' home and developed a variety of work-for-hire entertainment projects, including pinball hardware and game programming for Data East Pinball (stern pinball) In its early years, IT struggled to maintain profitability, with no hit products.

In 1988, IT developed hardware and software for its first coin-operated video game, Capcom Bowling, which used a trackball to simulate the movement of a bowler's toss. A dozen more titles followed in the 1990s under the brand name Strata Games: Strata Bowling, Arlington Horse Racing, Hot Shots Tennis, Peggle, Poker Dice, Rim Rockin’ Basketball, Ninja Clowns, Time Killers, Hard Yardage, Driver’s Edge, BloodStorm and Pairs.

In September 1989, at the Amusement and Music Operators Association (AMOA) International Expo, the company launched a golf game titled Golden Tee Golf, which used a trackball much like the bowling game, this time to simulate a golfer's swing. The game built a following throughout the 1990s, and by 1996 IT was producing updates to the game every year. Golden Tee has seen three major hardware platform changes since its initial release: Golden Tee 3D Golf in 1995, Golden Tee Fore! in 2000 and Golden Tee LIVE in 2005, which allows players to compete in online tournaments for cash and prizes. The game celebrated its 20th anniversary in 2009, and IT released a new high-definition version of the game in a Showpiece cabinet.

Co-founder Elaine Hodgson has been president of the company since its founding in the mid-1980s.

== Casino gaming ==
In the face of declining coin-operated video game sales, IT diversified its product line with improvements to electronic gaming machine (EGM) and slot machine technology. In 2008 the company released the Magic Touch collection of video slot, poker and keno games. Initially unavailable in the United States, the casino games became available on Royal Caribbean's Independence of the Seas.

== Technology ==
Technological innovations at IT have included:

- ITNet server-based technology, employing CDMA (Code Division Multiple Access), which compiles statistics such as player scores and tournament activity from online coin-operated machines without telephone lines or an Internet connection.
- The Silent Partner route management tool, which was the first computer-based tool allowing coin-operated video game and vending machine operators to electronically track and manage machine collections.

== WiiWare ==
IT collaborated with n-Space to create its first WiiWare title, Target Toss Pro: Bags, released on November 17, 2008, and followed in the fall of 2009 with a retro title from the 1990s, Carnival King.

Another Target Toss game entitled Target Toss Pro: Lawn Darts, was released on September 27, 2010. It features a Wi-Fi connection and online leaderboard for games such as darts and poker, by throwing the lawn dart towards the target.
