= Peter Jacobsen's Golden Tee 3D Golf =

1995 video game

- Developer: Incredible Technologies
- Publishers: Incredible Technologies; Infogrames (PlayStation)
- Series: Golden Tee Golf
- Platforms: Arcade, Microsoft Windows, PlayStation
- Release: Arcade: NA: 1995; Windows: NA: 14 August 1998; PlayStation: NA: 20 September 2000
- Genre: Sports
- Modes: Single-player; Multiplayer

Peter Jacobsen's Golden Tee 3D Golf is a video game developed and published by Incredible Technologies for the arcade. It was later ported to PlayStation and Windows. It is based on the popularity of golfer Peter Jacobsen.

== Gameplay ==
Gameplay screenshot.

Peter Jacobsen's Golden Tee 3D Golf is a golf game featuring a trackball, and three 18-hole golf courses. The game allows for up to 4 players at a time, and in the case of 2 players of more, allows you to play Stroke Play or Skins mode. These games always have 3 different courses per revision (with the exception of the home versions, which have six), with hittable trees or objects, lakes and cliffs (that are out of bounds). Golden Tee 3D Golf was used as the basis for the next games of the series until Golden Tee Fore, with the next games (97', 98', 99', 2K and Classic) being mostly the same except with different courses.

== Home versions ==
The PSX and PC games (which happen to be one of the only home ports of the Golden Tee series), simply called Peter Jacobsen's Golden Tee Golf are based on Golden Tee '97, sharing some of the menu assets (which are already shared on most revisions of the game) and the courses on it, but also include 3 new extra courses. The PSX version includes some extra modes and hole overviews on the start of each hole, but as there isn't any analog controller for PSX (by default), the trackball controls were replaced, as you hold Down in the D-Pad to adjust the power of your backswing (The game also seems to have support for Dualshock). Meanwhile, the PC version had support for LAN and Online, as well as Shadow Games that you could save and share to then play with a player from a previously saved shadow game as if it was playing with you. It also uses the mouse for analog input, allowing you to move the mouse backwards to adjust the backswing, and then forward to swing it (you can adjust the hit to make it go leftmost or rightmost if you move the mouse forward and to one of the two directions).

== Reception ==
In North America, RePlay reported Peter Jacobsen's Golden Tee 3D Golf was the seventh most-popular arcade game on location at the time. Next Generation reviewed the arcade version of the game, rating it three stars out of five, and stated that "This is a great golfing game that's even fun for anti-golfers."
