= Phasor Zap =

1978 video game

- Publisher(s): The Elektrik Keyboard
- Programmer(s): Chris Oberth
- Platform(s): Apple II
- Release: 1978
- Mode(s): Single-player

Phasor Zap is a game for the Apple II programmed by Chris Oberth and published in 1978 by The Elektrik Keyboard of Chicago, Illinois.

== Game play ==
Phasor Zap presents the player with a purple-tinted starfield that represents the view from the player's spacecraft. Enemy spacecraft appear from the edges of the screen and move straight across it, and it's up to the player to use to the paddles to focus four "phasor" beams onto each ship to destroy it, earning points. The player begins with a limited amount of phasor energy, one point of which is consumed each time the player shoots. When the amount of remaining energy reaches zero, the phasor is depleted and the game is over.

When an enemy ship crosses either the vertical or horizontal center line of the screen, it fires, scoring a hit. When this happens, the word "ZAP!" briefly fills the screen. If the player hasn't already run out of phasor energy, the game will end when the enemies score 99 hits.

The term "phasor" alludes to the phaser energy weapons used in the Star Trek science fiction series.
