= BloodStorm =

1994 video game

- Developer: Incredible Technologies
- Publisher: Strata
- Producer: Elaine Ditton
- Designer: Chris Oberth
- Composer: Leif Marwede
- Platform: Arcade
- Release: 1994 (arcade)
- Genre: Fighting
- Modes: Single-player, multiplayer

BloodStorm is a 1994 arcade fighting game published by Strata and developed by Incredible Technologies. It is considered a spiritual sequel to Time Killers.

BloodStorm was dubbed as a possible "Mortal Kombat-killer" in an attempt to surpass rival Midway Games's success with Mortal Kombat, though it did not prevail. It was the last game Strata produced before the company went out of business. Home ports for the Saturn and PlayStation were announced in early 1995, but were later cancelled.

== Plot ==
BloodStorm is set in a distant, post-apocalyptic future where the world, ravaged by war and famine, has divided into eight provinces ruled by the High Emperor. At the start of the game, the Emperor is assassinated by an unknown assailant, bringing the Empire to the brink of a global war. In accordance with ancient laws the ruling kings and queens of the provinces agree to gather and have a tournament, dubbed the BloodStorm, to determine the next High Emperor, in hopes of preventing further conflict.

== Gameplay ==
Fallout (Left) versus Talon (right), Talon's arm has been severed.

As with its predecessor Time Killers, BloodStorm features many of the aspects carried down from it, such as the removal of an opponent's arms and an instant kill attack, as well as a Special Death Move. The button layout is similar. They are labeled as "back leg", "front leg", "back arm" and "front arm" respectively. A button in the center is used to make the character block. If a limb is lost in combat, its corresponding button is rendered useless.

BloodStorm is a weapons-based fighting game, though it differs from Time Killers in that the characters use weapons called "Gauntlets" that allow them to use particular powers and attacks with them. Other than being able to bash off an opponent's arms, a technique called a Sunder is in the game. If executed when an opponent is stunned, it will destroy their lower body. The character will not be able to jump or use kicks, but can still move back and forth a little with the leg buttons.

Even after a successful Sunder attack, the fight can still go on, if the character's life bar is not totally drained yet. However, if both limbs are lost afterwards (if they were not already torn off prior to the Sunder attack) then they are almost completely helpless. There are a few special moves that do not require arms or legs, and those can still be performed. Characters are restored back to normal form after a round is over much like Time Killers as well.

A notable feature in the game is that when an opponent is defeated, the player gains a passable power. These powers or weapons can be used at any time to give the player a further advantage. Players can save their progress in a game with a password feature by pressing buttons during the player select screen. However, since the data was saved only until the machine was turned off, it was not beneficial unless used to pick the game back up where it ended.

The game features 7 secret characters who can be found based on how a player defeated an enemy, interactions with certain environments, or codes entered after a match. These 7 characters, plus one additional character (faced after defeating the 8 main characters), were collectively known as the Agents of Nekron. Defeating all 8 of these characters unlocked a special ending after defeating the final boss.

== Development ==
Home ports for the Saturn and PlayStation were announced in early 1995, but were later cancelled.

== Reception ==
In North America, RePlay reported BloodStorm to be the eight most-popular arcade game at the time. Play Meter listed the game to be the seventeenth most-popular arcade game at the time. According to Electronic Gaming Monthly, "BloodStorm enjoyed some success in the arcades, but it had very tough competition (MKII)."

Entertainment Weekly gave the game a D and wrote that "If The Simpsons ever did a parody of Mortal Kombat, the result might be BloodStorm, a brutal fighting game in which players cut each other's arms off, launch cruise missiles at one another, and get impaled. But BloodStorm isn't funny, except in a snickering, Beavis and Butt-Head sort of way — like when the screen flashes 'Cat Fight!' before two female combatants step into the ring."

== See also ==
- List of fighting games
