= Moon War =

1981 video game

- Arcade flyer
- Developer: Stern Electronics
- Publisher: Stern Electronics
- Platform: Arcade
- Release: NA: October 1981
- Genre: Multidirectional shooter
- Modes: Single-player, multiplayer

Moon War is a 1981 multidirectional shooter video game developed and published by Stern Electronics for arcades. It was released in North America in October 1981.

In 2023, Atari SA acquired the rights to twelve Stern Electronics video games including Moon War.

== Gameplay ==
The player controls a spaceship who must fly to and protect fuel bases while defeating enemies in a horizontally scrolling level. The spaceship is navigated with a steering wheel while buttons for thrusting, using shields or flipping the ship's direction. The game ends when the player runs out of fuel, which can be refueled at fuel bases. Finite amounts of shields can be used to protect the player, but render the player vulnerable when depleted.
