= Time Killers =

1992 video game

- Developer: Incredible Technologies
- Publisher: Strata
- Producer: Elaine Ditton
- Designer: R. Scott Morrison
- Programmers: Chris Oberth; Michael Hanson
- Artists: Ralph Melgosa; Richard Ditton; Dale Kerkman
- Composers: David Thiel; Leif Marwede
- Platforms: Arcade, Sega Genesis, iiRcade
- Release: November 1992; 1996 (Genesis); 2021 (iiRcade)
- Genre: Fighting
- Modes: Single-player, multiplayer

Time Killers is a 1992 weapon-based fighting arcade game developed by Incredible Technologies and published by Strata. Along with Allumer's Blandia, Time Killers is one of the earliest weapon-based fighting games modeled after Capcom's Street Fighter II (1991). It was later overshadowed by the success of SNK's 1993 weapon-based fighting game, Samurai Shodown. In Time Killers, eight warriors from different periods in history face off with each other, and then Death, for a chance at immortality.

A home port for the Sega Genesis was released four years after the arcade version, after having been delayed and even cancelled for a time. It was met with overwhelmingly negative reviews. A port was released in 2021 for the iiRcade home arcade console by BASH Gaming Studio.

== Gameplay ==
Wülf (left) versus Leif (right), Leif's arm has been amputated.

Time Killers plays much like Mortal Kombat, with some similarities to Street Fighter II. Rather than the standard layout of punches and kicks of various strengths, a specific button is used to attack with the corresponding body part: left arm, right arm, left leg, right leg, and the head. A stronger attack can be executed by pressing both limb buttons at the same time. The attack buttons involving respective arms and legs are also the basis of BloodStorm as well as Namco Bandai's Tekken series, the 2011 Mortal Kombat game, and Bio F.R.E.A.K.S..

If enough damage is done to an arm, it will be severed from the character's body, rendering it useless in combat. Both arms can be severed in the same round, forcing the character to fight with only legs and head and depriving them of the ability to block or use any weapons. Damage can also be done to the legs, but they cannot be severed. Repeated blows to the head in a short time will cause a character to become briefly stunned and unable to attack or defend.

The player may attempt a "Death Move" by pressing all five buttons at once. If successful, the attack cuts off the opponent's head and ends the round immediately; however, it can be blocked. A "Super Death Move" is also possible, but can only be executed while near a stunned opponent; the player holds the joystick toward the opponent and presses all five buttons, cutting off both arms and the head. Both of these moves differ from the "Fatalities" in Mortal Kombat in that they may be attempted at any time. Severed limbs and heads are restored after each round.

A character can win a round by knocking out the opponent, executing either type of Death Move, or having more health than the opponent when time runs out. Two victories out of three are required to win a match. The player may select any of the eight characters before each match, instead of having to play as the same character throughout the game.

Each of the warriors in the game hails from a different period, bringing their own origins and weapons into the battle. The handbook that was made for the game goes into detail that explains the origins and background of each. A few of the characters are based on historical figures and legends. Defeating all eight warriors allows the player to fight Death in a final match; a victory makes the player's character immortal and ends the game.

== Ports ==
Ports were announced for the Super NES and Genesis/Mega Drive, with an intended release in Spring 1994, but Nintendo had the Super NES version cancelled early that Spring, while the Genesis/Mega Drive version's release date was pushed back. Two months later the Genesis/Mega Drive version was cancelled entirely, even though developer THQ had already completed it. According to a journalist for GamePro, "Reportedly, the game was considered too explicit. It also had a poor test run among reviewers who saw the preview copy."

Nearly two years later, it was announced that the Genesis version would finally be released in July 1996. It was eventually published by Black Pearl in 1996 but sold poorly, due to being cited by most video game magazine critics as having incredibly poor graphics, sound, and playability. In early 1997 a THQ spokesperson stated that all plans for further ports of Time Killers had been cancelled.

== Reception ==
Genesis release reviews

Review scores
Publication	Score
Electronic Gaming Monthly	5/10, 5/10, 4/10, 4/10, 3/10; 5/10, 3/10, 3/10, 3/10
Next Generation	1/5

In the United States, Play Meter listed Time Killers as the eighth most-popular arcade game in February 1993. RePlay listed it as the top arcade software conversion kit the same month. According to Ralph Melgosa of Incredible Technologies, Time Killers sold roughly 7,000 units, which for a small company like Incredible Technologies was a major success.

Electronic Gaming Monthly reviewed the Genesis version in 1993, roughly half a year before it was cancelled, and three years before its ultimate release by a different publisher. They gave it a 4.2 out of 10, remarking that "The only remotely redeeming factor of this 'fighting' game is the 'super death moves' where you dismember an opponent. Otherwise, the game play, sound, and technique aren't here." They gave it a second review the following month, in which they lowered the score to 3.5 out of 10 and assessed it as a botched conversion of an already awful arcade game, citing poor graphics, audio, and controls, and generally unappealing gameplay.

Upon the Genesis version's ultimate release in 1996, GamePro criticized that the game was completely unchanged from the 1994 review copy, retaining the same routine gameplay, poor controls, choppy animation, muffled voices, and backgrounds which "look almost 8 bit". Next Generation thoroughly panned it, saying it "lacks any redeeming qualities whatsoever" and "is easily the worst example of a 2D fighting game in history." They echoed GamePro's remark that the graphics could be taken for 8-bit, and said the worst aspect of the game is its control scheme.

== See also ==
- BloodStorm, a spiritual sequel
