= Days of Thunder (1990 video game) =

1990 racing video game

- NES cover art
- Developers: Beam Software (NES); Creative Materials Ltd. (Amiga, Atari ST); Tiertex Design Studios (Commodore 64, ZX Spectrum); Argonaut Software (other platforms)
- Publisher: Mindscape Group
- Producer: Gary Liddon
- Programmers: Trevor Nuridin; Andrew Bailey; Carl Muller; Andrew Carter; Jamie Rivett
- Artist: Parrish Haywood
- Composers: Tania Smith (NES); David Whittaker (Amiga, Atari ST, MS-DOS, Game Boy)
- Platforms: Amiga, Atari ST, C64, MS-DOS, Game Boy, NES, iOS, Xbox Live Arcade, PlayStation Network, ZX Spectrum
- Release: 1990, 1992
- Genre: Racing
- Modes: Single-player, multiplayer

Days of Thunder is a 1990 NASCAR racing simulation video game loosely based on the 1990 movie Days of Thunder. The game utilized elements from the movie, using a movie license from Paramount Pictures for its graphical elements, plot, and music soundtrack. It was released for the PC, the NES, the Game Boy, and many other formats. It was created by Argonaut Software and distributed by Mindscape Group. In 2009 Freeverse released an updated version for iOS.

== Gameplay ==
During-game image. Note cracked dashboard. (DOS)

In the PC version, gameplay consisted of setting up the car, qualifying, and then the actual race event. If the player finished in a high enough position, they would progress to the next circuit. Damage was calculated not by realistic damage displayed on the car but a "cracked dashboard" bar indicator, with cracks appearing along the dashboard when the player hits something (the same as that used in the 1989 release Stunt Car Racer).

== Development ==
Prior to the version developed by Beam Software, a version of the game was in development at Mindscape by Chris Oberth. At some point, Oberth's version was cancelled and the work transferred to Beam Software. Oberth's version was recovered from floppy discs in 2020 after his death by the Video Game History Foundation and its source code was made available in June with permission of Oberth's estate.

Additional versions of Beam Software's game were ported to the PC in 1990 and to the Game Boy in 1992.

== Reception ==
- According to website Lemon64, Commodore 64 magazine Zzap!64 gave the C64 version of Days of Thunder a 52 out of 100.

== See also ==
- Days of Thunder (2011)
