= Dark Planet (1983 video game) =

1983 video game

- Arcade flyer
- Developer: Stern Electronics
- Publisher: Stern Electronics
- Designers: Erick Erickson; Dan Langlois
- Platform: Arcade
- Release: NA: January 1983
- Genre: Multidirectional shooter
- Modes: Single-player, multiplayer

Dark Planet is a 1983 multidirectional shooter video game developed and published by Stern Electronics for arcades. It was released in North America in January 1983. It is notable for its use of an active shutter 3D system similar to Sega's SubRoc-3D, which was released around the same time.

In 2023, Atari SA acquired the rights to twelve Stern Electronics video games including Dark Planet.

== Gameplay ==
The player controls a spaceship which defeats enemies on the surface of a distant planet. There is no background as gameplay is superimposed on a painting of the planet's surface. Enemies can be destroyed with the player's ammunition or limited amount of lasers, giving players varying amounts of points on defeat.
