= Armored Car (video game) =

1981 video game

- Developer: Stern Electronics
- Publisher: Stern Electronics
- Designers: Chris Oberth; Gunars Licitis
- Platform: Arcade
- Release: 1981
- Genre: Maze
- Modes: Single-player, multiplayer

Armored Car is an overhead view maze arcade video game released by Stern Electronics in 1981. The player drives an armored car as the maze scrolls from right to left, collecting money, and avoiding criminals.

== Gameplay ==

Armored Car is a maze game where the player must drive the titular armored car through a city from an top-down view which scrolls right to left. Some intersections are marked with directions that must be followed. The player can pick up money to deliver to banks while avoiding criminals by dropping sawhorses in the road. Points are scored by number of city blocks travelled, picking up money, and blowing up robbers. Fuel levels need to be replenished at gas stations throughout the city. The player can speed up by pressing a button to shift the car into a higher gear. Other vehicles appear as the player progresses through the game. The steam roller changes directional arrows to sawhorses. The street sweeper will sweep up sawhorses and directional arrows. The T.N.T. truck moves in a straight line from right to left, unless it views the armored car, where it will pursue the player in a straight line. If the truck crashes into a wall, the player gains 1000 bonus points.

== Development ==
Armored Car was developed by Chris Oberth and Gunars Licitis. It was inspired by the video game Targ.

== Reception ==
Bill Kunkel for Electronic Games described Armored Car as "a fairly unique, and highly interesting, game concept" that uses "interesting audio and graphics to create a game that even young arcaders should enjoy", in addition that it was a "delightful" and "fun" contest.

== See also ==
- Getaway!
- Targ
