= Arlington Horse Racing =

1990 video game

- Developer: Incredible Technologies
- Publisher: Strata
- Platform: Arcade
- Release: NA: 1990
- Genre: Horse racing
- Mode: Single player

Arlington Horse Racing is a horse racing arcade game released by Strata / Incredible Technologies in 1990, based on the Arlington Park race track.

== Summary ==

The player inserts coins into the slots, and then bets on the horses. Once betting is completed, the player should press the start race button to see the horses run the track. The game then pays off any winning bids in credits, and then starts over. The game features the voice of Arlington's famous announcer Phil Georgeff.
