= Championship Wrestling (video game) =

1986 video game

- Developers: Free Radical Software; Octasoft (C16)
- Publishers: NA: Epyx; EU: U.S. Gold
- Designers: Richard Ditton; Elaine Ditton
- Programmers: Richard Ditton; Elaine Ditton
- Artists: Timothy Skelly; Lonnie D. Ropp
- Composer: David Thiel
- Platforms: Apple II, Atari ST, Commodore 64, Commodore 16
- Release: 1986
- Genre: Professional wrestling
- Modes: Single-player, multiplayer

Championship Wrestling is a professional wrestling video game released by Epyx for the Apple II in 1986. Ports were released for the Commodore 64, and Atari ST.

== Gameplay ==
The game includes eight fictional wrestlers, including The Berserker, Purple Hays, H. Manslayer, Zeke Weasel, Prince Vicious, Colonel Rooski, K.C. Colossus, and Zanto Klaw.

== Development ==
Championship Wrestling was originally intended as a WWF game, but the licence never materialized.
