= Strategy X =

1981 video game

- North American arcade flyer
- Developer: Konami
- Publishers: JP: Konami; NA: Stern Electronics
- Platforms: Arcade, Atari 2600
- Release: Arcade: JP: November 1981; NA: December 1981; 2600; 1983
- Genre: Multidirectional shooter
- Modes: Single-player, multiplayer

Strategy X (Note: Japanese: ストラテジーX, Hepburn: Sutoratejī X) is a 1981 multidirectional shooter video game developed and published by Konami for arcades. It was released by Stern Electronics in North America. A version for the Atari 2600 was published by Konami in 1983. The player controls a tank through various stages, defeating enemies and picking up fuel.

The arcade version was included as part of Game Room for the Xbox 360 and Windows on May 26, 2010. Hamster Corporation released the game as part of their Arcade Archives series for the Nintendo Switch and PlayStation 4 on June 19, 2025.

== Gameplay ==
Gameplay

The player controls a tank who navigates numerous levels and defeats enemies to destroy an enemy base of the Immortalian. The tank can freely move around and rotate to shoot enemies on all angles, but movement requires fuel, which ends the game when used up. Fuel scattered around the level can be use to refill, but explodes when shot. The player also dies after crashing into obstacles.

== Reception ==
Electronic Games called Strategy X "a somewhat off-beat, more abstract design than is usually found in arcade wargames" but "no less riveting." Dan Persons, in a review of the Atari 2600 version for Video Games magazine, called it a "good, no frills style combat game." He considered the gameplay to be fun and challenging but thought the game would lose interest quickly. In a retrospective look, AllGame said, "Strategy X's graphics are colorful, but not always helpful in terms of figuring out what's going on".
