= The Elektrik Keyboard =

Computer and musical instrument store

Software catalog cover.

The Elektrik Keyboard was a computer and musical instrument store located on North Lincoln Avenue in Chicago, Illinois from 1978 to 1980. In the late 1970s it added personal computers to its lineup, and began publishing Apple II computer software written by programmer Chris Oberth. The software, advertised in the company's catalog and sold on cassette, largely consisted of games including some that emulated popular arcade titles.

== Software ==
The Elektrik Keyboard published the following titles written by Chris Oberth in 1978 and 1979:

- 3-D Docking Mission
- Cycle Jump
- Dart Room
- Deflection
- Demolition Derby
- Depth Charge
- Drawing Board
- Frustration
- Intercepter
- Kaleidoscope
- Moto-Cross
- Phasor Zap
- Recall
- RunAround
- Speed Racer

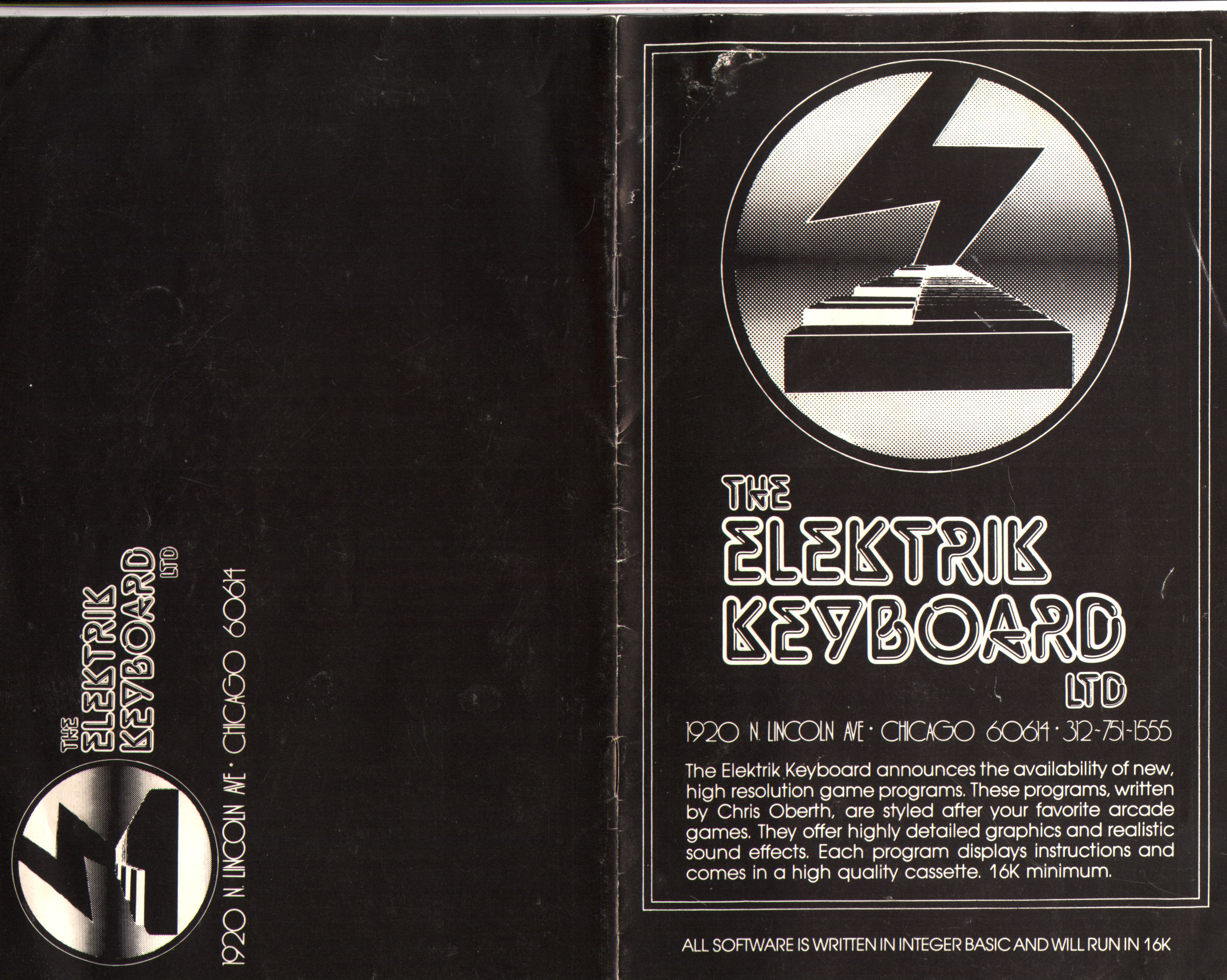

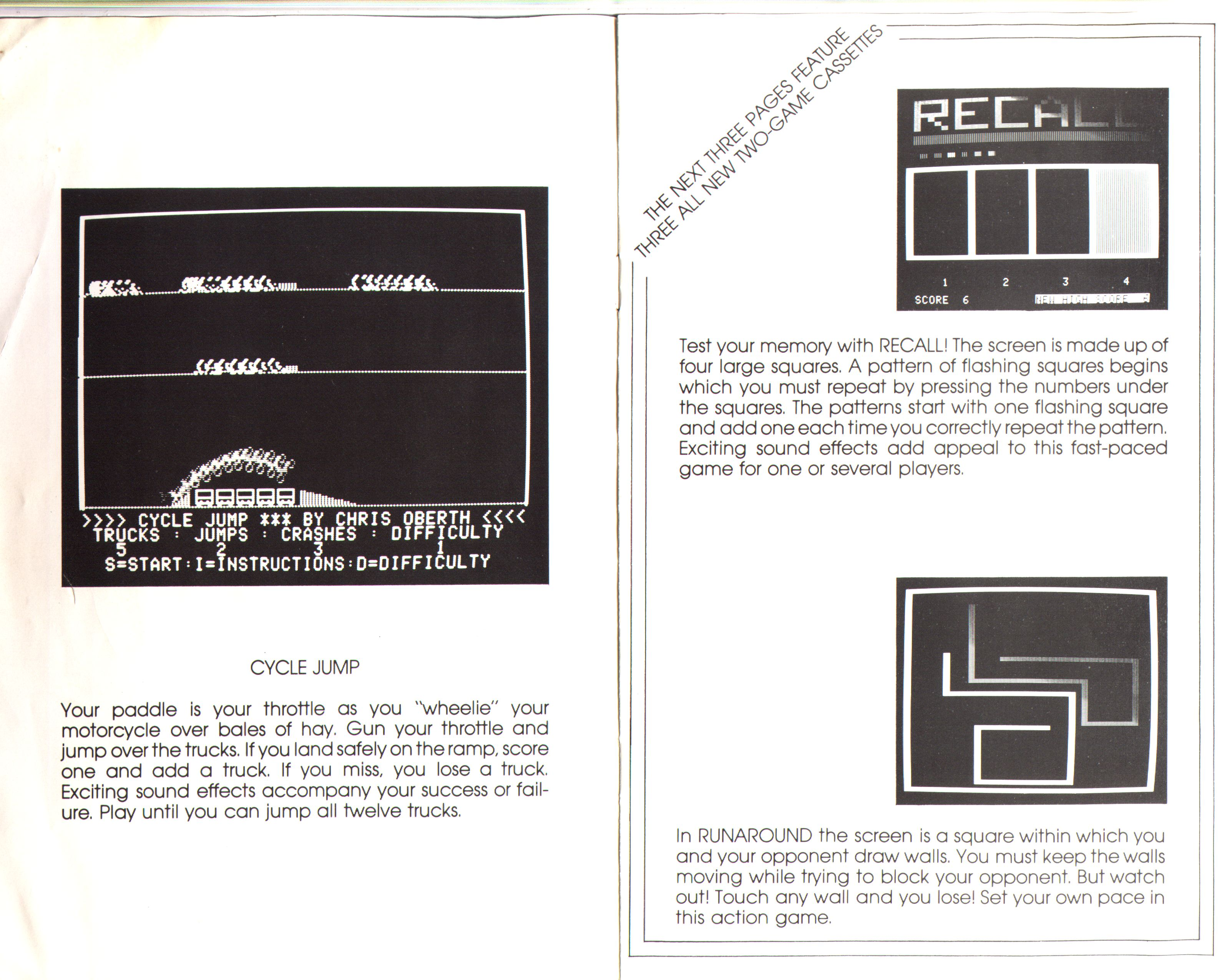

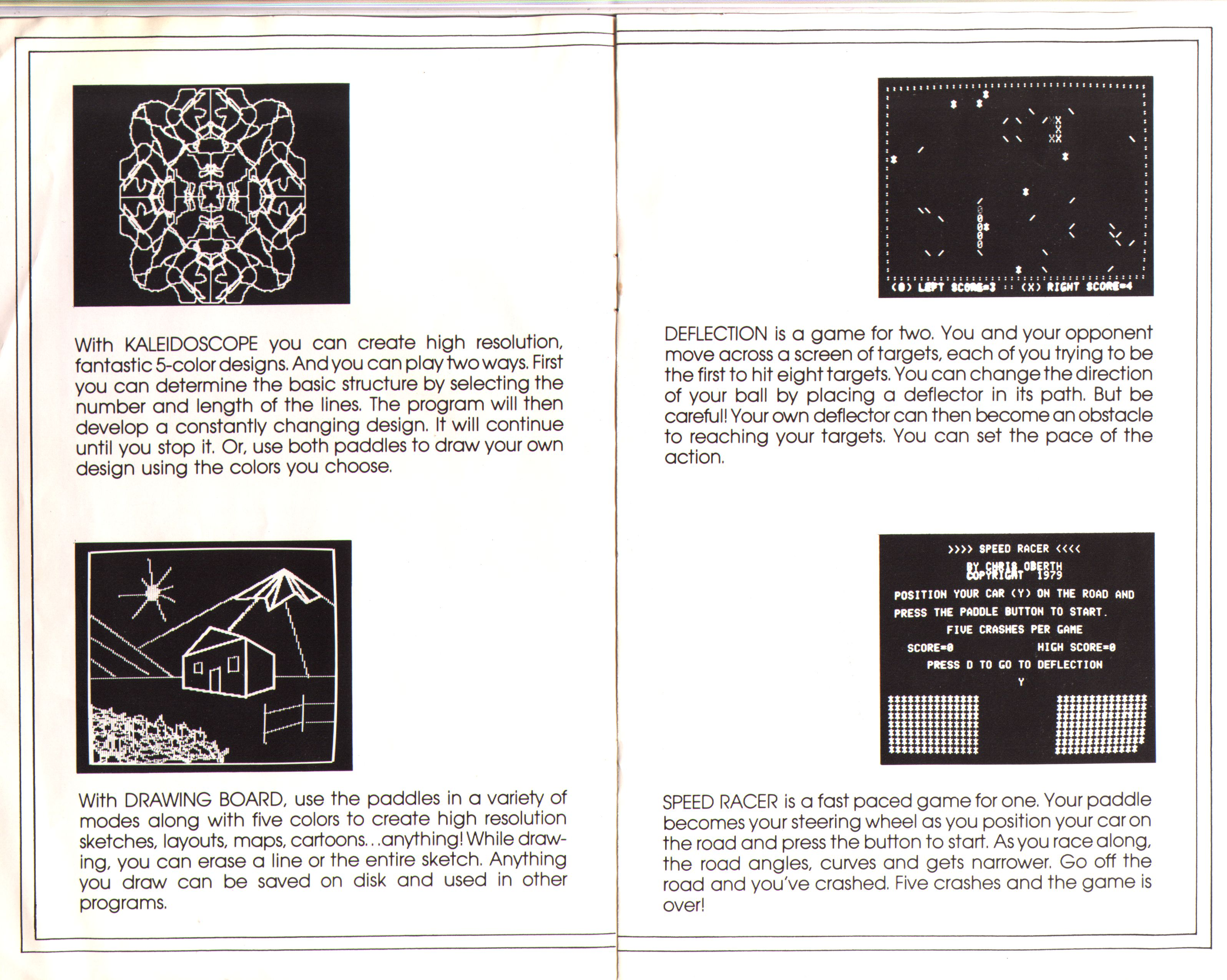

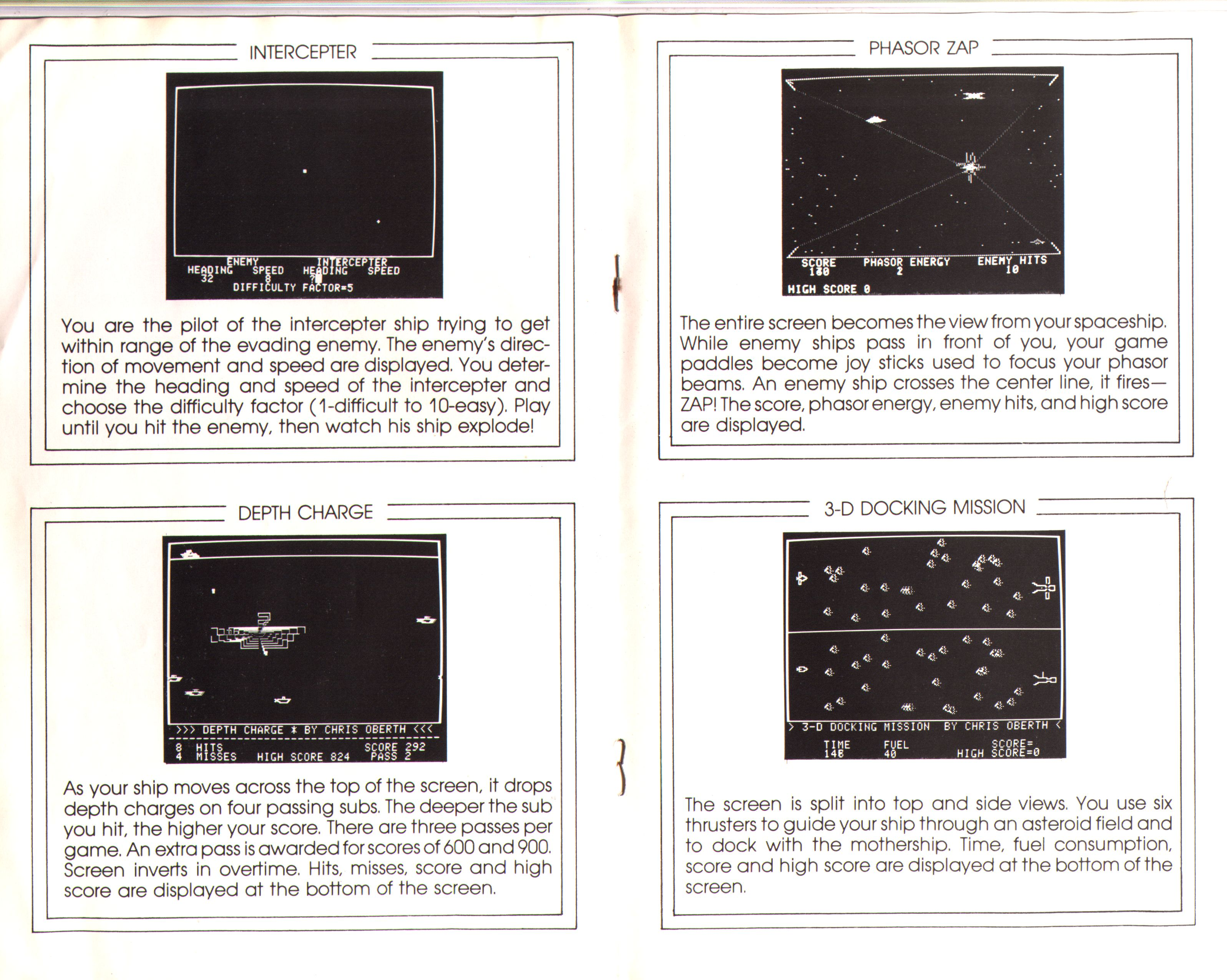

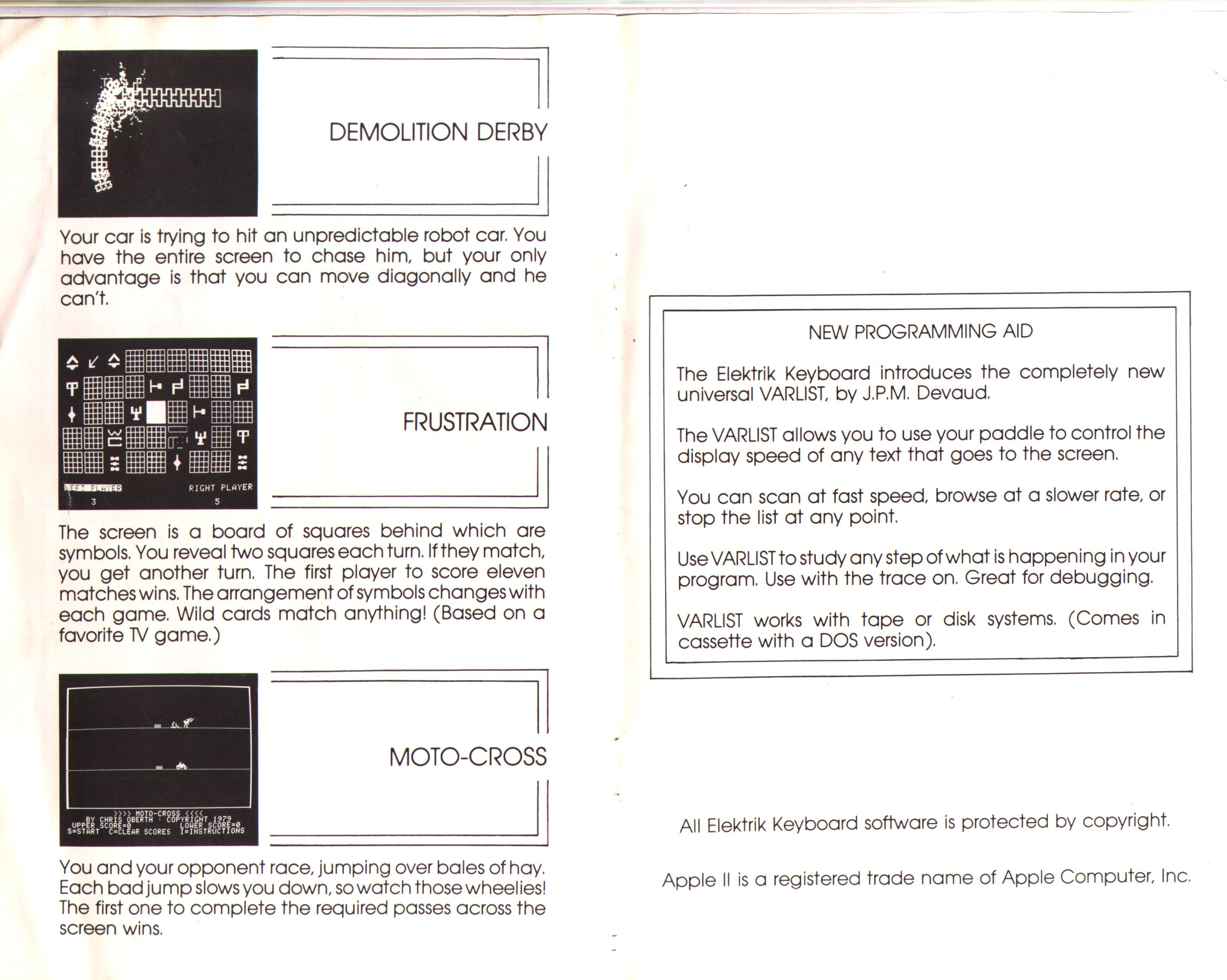

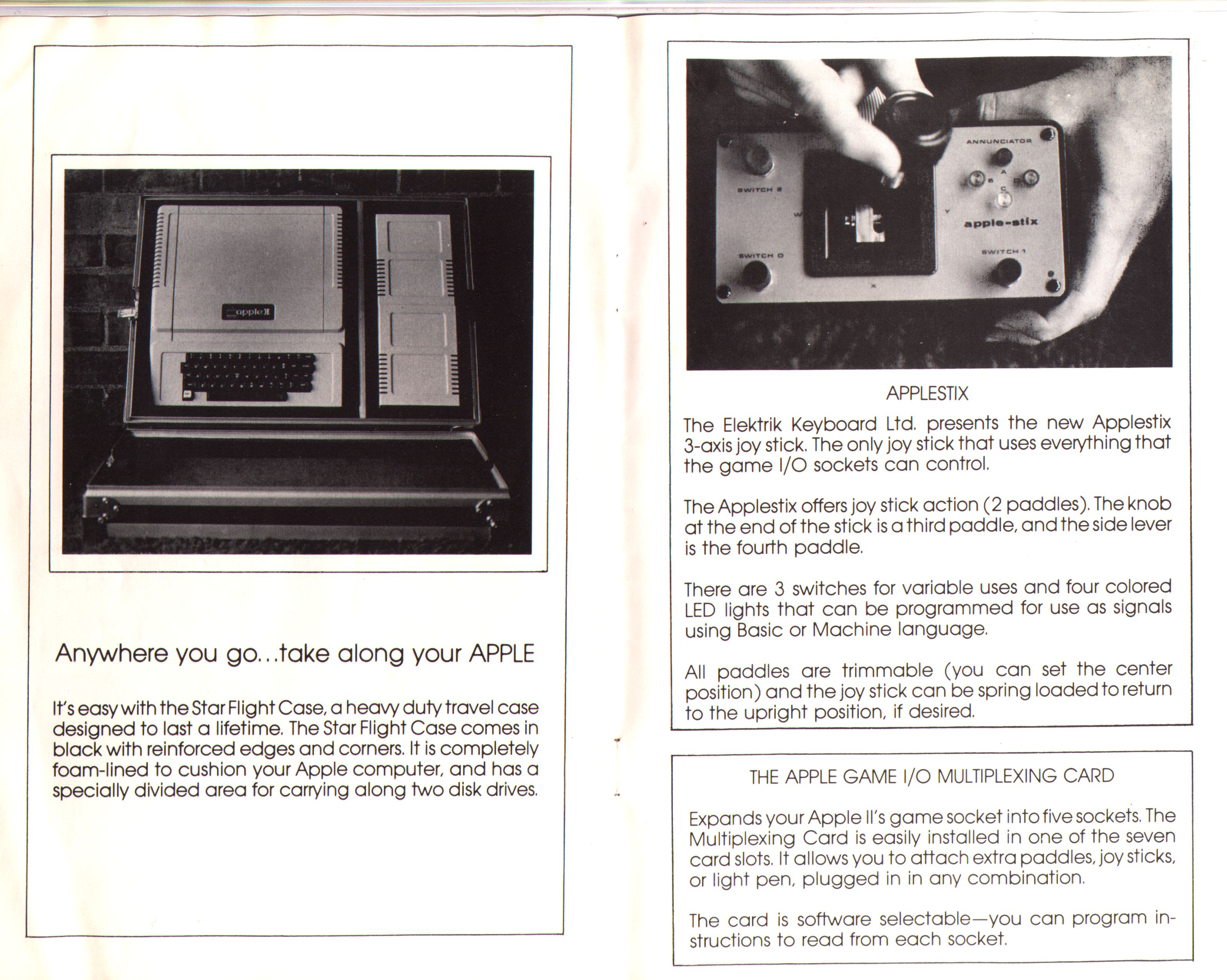
