= Cloak & Dagger (video game) =

1984 video game

- Developer: Atari, Inc.
- Publishers: Atari, Inc.
- Producer: John Ray
- Designer: Russel Dawe
- Programmer: Russel Dawe
- Platform: Arcade
- Release: NA: March 1984
- Genre: Twin-stick shooter
- Modes: Single-player, multiplayer
- Arcade system: 6502-based hardware

Cloak & Dagger is a twin-stick shooter arcade video game released by Atari, Inc. in March 1984 as a tie-in to the 1984 film Cloak & Dagger. The game saw limited arcade release as a conversion kit for Robotron: 2084 cabinets.

== Gameplay ==
Gameplay screenshot

Cloak & Dagger is a multidirectional shooter game.

== Development and release ==
The game was created by Russel Dawe. The game was under development using the title Agent X when the movie producers and Atari learned of each other's projects and decided to cooperate. When Atari was consulted to provide a game as an element of the movie, they tweaked Agent X and renamed it Cloak & Dagger. Dabney Coleman's character was named "Jack Flack" in the movie in lieu of "Agent X". The film shows an Atari 5200 version of the game, but the cartridge props are actually other 5200 games with a Cloak & Dagger label stuck on them and the gameplay footage is of the arcade version modified to output onto a television screen. A 5200 port was planned, but development on it never began.

A port for Atari 8-bit computers was being developed by Atari, Inc. employee Dave Comstock in 1984, but was never finished.

== Reception ==
Computer and Video Games gave Cloak & Dagger an overall positive outlook.
