= Pop Flamer =

1982 video game

- North American arcade flyer
- Developers: Jaleco; Sega (SG-1000)
- Publishers: JP: Jaleco; NA: Stern Electronics; Sega (SG-1000)
- Platforms: Arcade, SG-1000
- Release: Arcade: JP: December 1982; NA: June 1983; SG-1000: JP: November 1983; PAL: 1984
- Genre: Action
- Modes: Single-player, multiplayer

Pop Flamer (Note: Japanese: ポップフレーマー, Hepburn: Poppu Furēmā) is a 1982 action video game developed and published by Jaleco for arcades. It was released in Japan in December 1982 and North America by Stern Electronics in June 1983. It was ported to the SG-1000 by Sega in Japan in November 1983 and then PAL territories in 1984. Hamster Corporation released the game as part of their Arcade Archives series for the Nintendo Switch and PlayStation 4 in September 2021.

== Gameplay ==
The player controls a mouse who must pop various balloons scattered throughout levels. The player is armed with a flamethrower which can be used to exterminate frogs and monsters blocking paths; the flamethrower has a finite amount of fuel that depletes quickly and minimizes the amount of damage dealt, but can be replenished by popping balloons. Haradon, an enemy resembling Godzilla, can stun the player with an attack, leaving the player susceptible to attacks. Two juice glasses are available; when drank, the player gains a power-up that allows them to consume enemies for extra points for a limited time.
