= Oil's Well =

1983 video game

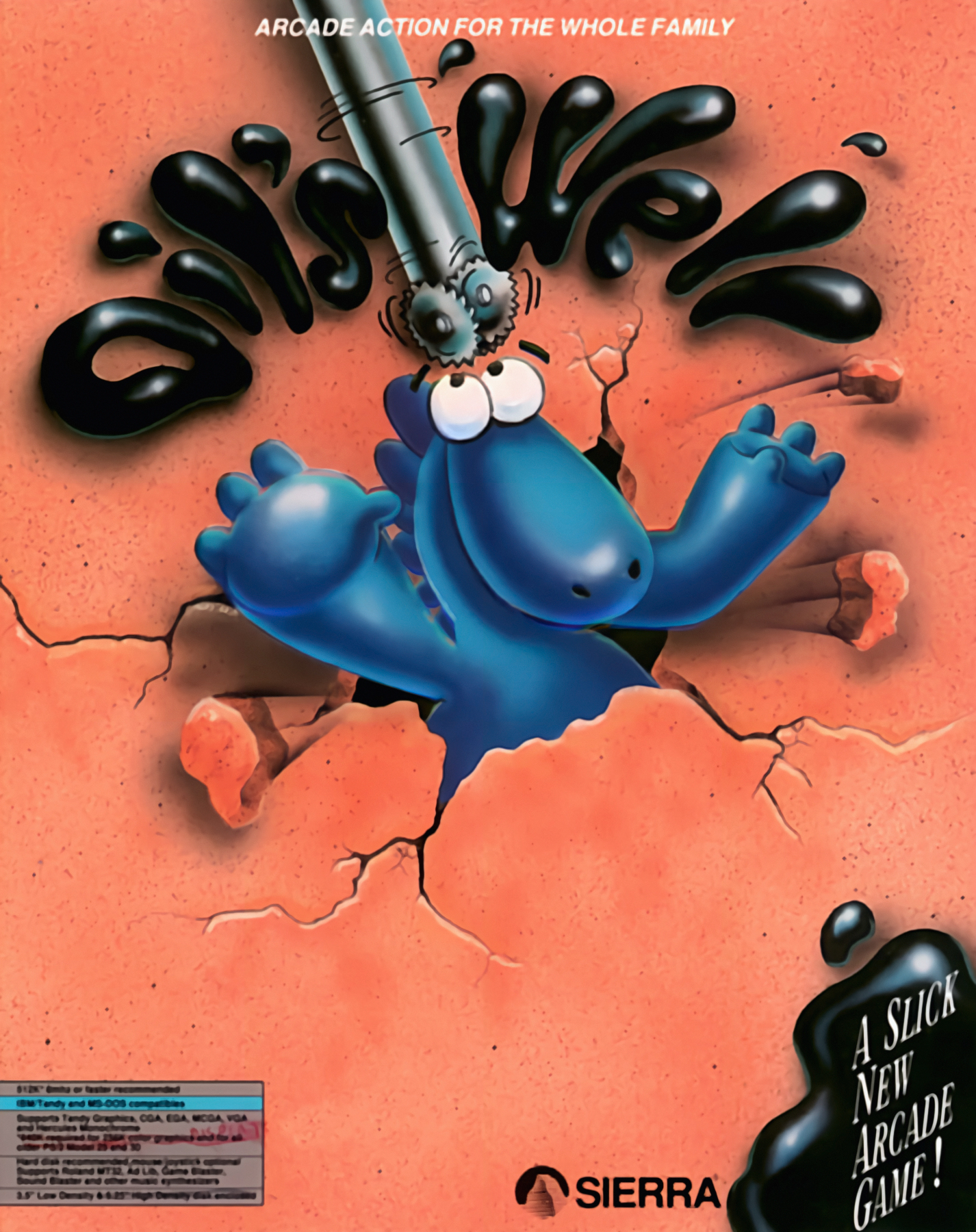
- Developer: Sierra On-Line
- Publisher: Sierra On-Line
- Programmers: Atari 8-bit Thomas J. Mitchell; Apple II; Ivan Strand; ColecoVision; Don McGlauflin
- Platforms: Apple II, Atari 8-bit, Commodore 64, ColecoVision, IBM PC, MS-DOS, MSX, Sharp X1
- Release: 1983: Atari; 1984: Apple II, C64, ColecoVision, IBM PC; 1985: MSX, Sharp; 1990: MS-DOS
- Genre: Maze
- Mode: Single-player

Oil's Well (a pun on "all's well") is a video game written by Thomas J. Mitchell for Atari 8-bit computers and published by Sierra On-Line in 1983.. It is similar to the 1982 arcade video game Anteater, re-themed to be about drilling for oil instead of a hungry insectivore. Ports were released in 1984 for the Apple II, Commodore 64, ColecoVision, and IBM PC (as a self-booting disk), then in 1985 for MSX and Sharp X1. A version with improved visuals and without Mitchell's involvement was released for MS-DOS in 1990.

== Gameplay ==
The pipeline has extended down into the fourth horizontal tunnel, and the bit is about to destroy a creature.

The player collects oil for a drilling operation by moving a drill bit through a maze of underground tunnels. The drill bit is trailed by a pipeline connecting it to the base. Subterranean creatures populate the maze; the bit can destroy the creatures, but the pipeline is vulnerable. As the player traverses the maze, the pipe grows longer, and the potential for it being hit by creatures increases. Pressing a button quickly retracts the head. There are 8 levels.

== Reception ==
ANALOG Computing said that Oil's Well for the Atari 8-bit was a "truly different and challenging" variant on the "'gobble the dots' theme", with good gameplay and graphics.

Dave Stone in Computer Gaming World stated that "The action's well-paced, the difficulty progressive. While getting to a higher level is somewhat dependent on getting the right breaks — good eye-hand coordination, timing, and strategy are essential".

Ahoy! stated that while the Commodore version's graphics and sounds were only "serviceable; gameplay is, in my experience, unique ... Recommended". InfoWorld called the IBM PCjr version "a clever, basic game", and InfoWorld's Essential Guide to Atari Computers cited the Atari 8-bit version as "Sierra's trickiest".

The U.S. gaming magazine Computer Games awarded Oil's Well the 1984 Golden Floppy Award for Excellence, in the category of "Maze Game of the Year."

== Legacy ==
Despite already being a clone of Anteater, several additional clones borrowed the theme of Oil's Well: Pipeline Run for the Commodore 64 in 1990 and Oilmania for the Atari ST in 1991.
