= Depth Charge (video game) =

1978 video game

- Screenshot and description from The Elektrik Keyboard catalog
- Publisher: The Elektrik Keyboard
- Programmer: Chris Oberth
- Platform: Apple II
- Release: 1978
- Mode: Single-player

Depth Charge is an action video game for the Apple II programmed by Chris Oberth and published by The Elektrik Keyboard of Chicago, Illinois in 1978. A clone of the 1977 arcade video game Depthcharge, the player drops explosives from a moving ship attempting to eliminate submarines below it.

== Gameplay ==
Like the 1977 arcade game Depthcharge that it emulates, Depth Charge puts the player in control of a small ship that drops depth charges onto passing submarines. In the arcade original, the player moves the ship left and right, but in Depthcharge the ship automatically makes three passes from right to left across the top of the screen, and four submarines at varying depths move from left to right below it. Destroying deeper subs earns more points. An extra pass is awarded at 600 points and another at 900.
