= 2012 in esports =

The year 2012 in esports (professional gaming).

== Calendar of events ==
(for extended events the final date is listed)

Date	Game	Event	Location	Winner/s
January 18	Dota 2	G-League 2011 Season 3	China	XiGua
January 22	StarCraft II; League of Legends; Counter-Strike	IEM VI - Kyiv	Kyiv, Ukraine	see article
March 3	StarCraft II	GSL Season 1 2012	Seoul	DongRaeGu
March 10	numerous games	IEM VI - World Championship		
March 25	numerous games	MLG Winter Championship 2012	New York, United States	
April 7	Counter-Strike; Counter-Strike: Global Offensive; Counter-Strike: Source; StarCraft II	Copenhagen Games 2012	Copenhagen	
April 8	League of Legends; StarCraft II	IGN Pro League (IPL) Season 4	Las Vegas	
April 29	five games	EPS Germany: Spring Season 2012 Finals		
May 19	League of Legends	OGN The Champions Spring 2012		
May 19	StarCraft II	GSL Season 2 2012		Mvp
June 10	King of Fighters XIII; League of Legends; Mortal Kombat 9 StarCraft II	MLG Spring Championship 2012		
June 18	numerous games	DreamHack Summer 2012	Sweden	see article
July 5–8	StarCraft II	WCS 2012:France Nationals	13th Impact Japan Expo; Paris-Nord Villepinte – Paris, France	Stephano
July 6–8	fighting games	Evolution 2012	Caesars Palace; Las Vegas, Nevada	
July 15	StarCraft II	NASL Season 3 finals	Toronto, Ontario, Canada	Stephano
August 11	StarCraft II	G-League 2012 Season 1		
August 25	StarCraft II	WCS 2012: North America	Anaheim Convention Center; Anaheim, California	
August 25	StarCraft II	WCS 2012: South Korea		
August 26	numerous games	MLG Summer Championship 2012		
September 2	Dota 2	The International 2012	KeyArena; Seattle	Invictus Gaming
September 8	League of Legends	OGN The Champions Summer 2012		
September 9	League of Legends	Season 2 World Championship Qualifiers		
September 16	StarCraft II	WCS 2012: Europe		
September 22	StarCraft II	2011–2012 Proleague Season 2	Korea	
October 13	League of Legends	Season 2 World Championship		Taipei Assassins
October 14	StarCraft II	WCS 2012: Asia		
October 20	StarCraft II	GSL Season 4 2012		
October 27	StarCraft II	Auction All-Kill OSL 2012	Seoul	Rain
October 28	StarCraft II; League of Legends	World e-Sports Masters 2012	Hangzhou	Leenock; Team WE
November 14	numerous games	MLG Fall Championship 2012		
December 12	Super Street Fighter II Turbo HD Remix; Street Fighter III: 3rd Strike Online Edition; Super Street Fighter IV Arcade Edition v2012 Street Fighter x Tekken	Street Fighter 25th Anniversary Tournament Finals	Hyatt Regency San Francisco Airport; Burlingame, California	Damdai (SSFIITHDR); MOV (SF3:3SOE); WW.MCZ Infiltration (AE2012, SFxT)
