= Silver Strike Bowling =

Arcade game

Silver Strike Bowling is an arcade game that mimics ten-pin bowling on a monitor corresponding to a player's trackball control. The game shares similar technology with Golden Tee Golf, an arcade golf game: both are produced by Arlington Heights, Illinois-based Incredible Technologies, Inc. ("IT.") Users may play standard bowling games or, depending on local availability, can select the Vegas Tournament option allowing players to draw cards for each spare and strike in an attempt to produce the best poker hand.

The original version of Silver Strike Bowling had a difficulty setting with three selections: Easy, Medium and Hard. However, it was not possible to determine the setting by playing the game as the setting was controlled by the operator or owner of the game cabinet. Silver Strike Bowling 2007 does not have this feature and all games have exactly the same physics at all times to ensure a level playing field for online play. While game play between them is otherwise similar, SSB 2009 can always be identified by "Silver Strike Bowling 2009" graphics in the attract mode and usually the game cabinet will have graphics which clearly identify it as an SSB 2009 or later unit. Silver Strike Bowling 2009 Bowler's Club games also have wireless online functionality, which is not present in the original Silver Strike Bowling games.

In its latest release, Silver Strike Bowling 2009 Bowler's Club, players are able to win Sweepstakes prizes by playing online-enabled versions. Silver Strike Bowling 2009 works on the ITNet 'LIVE' platform allowing players to see their stats when they play the game as well as view additional stats and historic game play on the Silver Strike Bowling website. IT issues "Player Cards" which allow players to enter contests and do a variety of other things both from ITNet-enabled games and from the company's websites. Player Cards for Golden Tee LIVE! work in Silver Strike Bowler's Club games and vice versa.

Silver Strike Bowling 2009 is an offline version (Unlike the "Bowlers Club" version) that is used at mostly smaller venues along with home units for game rooms. It offers all the same game play without the ability to track stats or win sweepstakes prizes.
