= Buy-to-play =

Video game industry business model

Buy-to-play (B2P) is a revenue model for video games where a game can be played after a one-time purchase, as opposed to a subscription model where the player must pay a subscription at regular intervals to continue having access to the game.

Buy-to-play, while a form of premium games, generally apply to games where there is continued ongoing content or support from the developer or publisher well beyond the period of purchase, such as through maintenance of online servers or through the production of ongoing content and expansions, as often the case in massively multiplayer online games (MMO). This support can be monetized through additional microtransactions or through an ongoing subscription fee. Microtransactions are becoming evermore entwined with the buy-to-play revenue model as most recent games allow for some sort of additional purchase. For example, buy-to-play title Guild Wars 2 allows players to purchase additional in-game items with microtransactions, while Destiny 2 lets users purchase season passes for additional content.

Buy-to-play can be contrasted with free-to-play (F2P), where users are granted access to a fully functional game (usually with limitations), but must pay microtransactions to access additional content. Some studies have been completed on the success of the free-to-play revenue model and also gamers' perception of this method. The results of one study shows that players are often satisfied with purchases made in free-to-play games, however, they believe a lot of content is overpriced. The study also displayed that free-to-play game developers create restrictions in order to encourage more purchases.

Pay-to-play (P2P) is a model in which a subscription payment is required on an ongoing basis, in order to use a service. When comparing the three revenue models, the free-to-play and buy-to-play model is slowly rising in popularity as the pay-to-play model is decreasing in relative popularity. This trend can be roughly shown by the number of World of Warcraft subscribers over the years. Since 2011, the number of subscribers has been decreasing with the exception of a few small spikes.

== Game mechanics ==
Buy-to-play games require a one time fee to install and play. Some games, such as ArenaNet's Guild Wars 2, use in-game advertising or "Cash Shops" to provide income for buy-to-play games, which usually offset the subscription fee of a pay-to-play game.
