= Target Toss Pro: Bags =

2007 video game

- Developers: Incredible Technologies n-Space
- Platforms: Arcade, Wii (WiiWare)
- Release: Arcade; 2007; WiiWare: NA: November 17, 2008
- Genre: Sports
- Modes: Single-player, Multiplayer

Target Toss Pro: Bags is an arcade video game by Incredible Technologies based on the backyard game Cornhole. A version for WiiWare co-developed by n-Space was released on November 17, 2008 in North America.

== Overview ==
Target Toss Pro: Bags is an alternative sports video game based on the game Cornhole. Gameplay consists of throwing bean bags onto a board with a hole in it. Getting a bag inside the hole scores extra points. The WiiWare version uses the motion sensing technology of the Wii Remote for play. The game features up to 16 player tournaments, the choice of male and female players, and extended leaderboards.

== Development ==
Target Toss Pro: Bags was initially developed by Incredible Technologies for arcade systems in 2007. They later collaborated with n-Space to create a WiiWare version. Executive director Andy Kniaz stated that he wanted to bring it to the Wii because "the use of the Wiimote captures the physical motion of the game perfectly", and cited Wii Bowling as an inspiration for a re-playable sports game experience. He later stated that they chose n-Space to develop the game because "There was a lot of mutual respect between the two teams, and based on their past work we had a high degree of confidence that they could help us capture the essence of our game."

== Reception ==
WiiWare World gave the game 6 out of 10, commenting that the game wasn't really something to play by yourself but said it was great fun with friends. IGN rated the game 6/10, stating "playing [Cornhole] through WiiWare feels like kind of a third-string alternative, and one that should probably only be pursued by diehard fans of the sport."
