= Aardvark (video game) =

1986 video game

- Developer: Bug-Byte
- Publisher: Bug-Byte
- Programmer: Stephen R. Kellett
- Platforms: Commodore 64, Commodore 16
- Release: 1986
- Genres: Maze
- Mode: Single-player

Aardvark is a maze video game for the Commodore 64 and Commodore 16, published by Bug-Byte in 1986. Aardvark is based on 1982 arcade game Anteater and 1983 Atari 8-bit computer game Ardy The Aardwark designed by Chris Oberth.

== Gameplay ==
The player must collect ant larva using the snout of an aardvark.
