= Programma International =

Programma International, Inc.
- Type: Corporation
- Industry: Video games
- Founded: 1978; 48 years ago
- Defunct: 1983
- Headquarters: Los Angeles
- Key people: David Gordon (president); Mel Norell (VP)
- Number of employees: 60
- Parent: Hayden Publishing (1980)

Programma International, Inc. was one of the first personal computer software publishers. Established in 1978 by David Gordon, it published a line of approximately 300 games, programming utility, and office productivity products for the Apple II, Commodore PET, TRS-80 and other personal computer systems. Hayden Publishing bought Programma International in 1980 and the company went out of business in 1983.

== Notable titles published ==
Year	Title	Genres	Platforms
	6502 Forth	Programming language	Apple II
	ASM65 Assembler	Assembler	Apple II
	Apple Alley		Apple II
1979	Apple Invader	Action	Apple II
	Alien Invasion	Action	Apple II
	Apple PIE	Utility software	Apple II
	Baseball	Sports	Apple II
	Blitzkrieg		Apple II
	Boxing	Sports	Apple II
	Breakthru	Action	Apple II
	Canter Downs	Action	Apple II
	Clowns and Ballons	Action	Apple II
	Death Race		Apple II
	Dragon Maze	Maze	Apple II
	Frustration		Apple II
	Guided Missile	Action	Apple II
	I-Ching		Apple II
	Jupiter Express	Action	Apple II
	Lores Hyperpak		Apple II
	Mouse Hole		Apple II
	Nightmare Number Nine		Apple II
	Peg Jump		Apple II
	Perpetual Calendar		Apple II
	Star Voyager		Apple II
	Stunt Cycle	Action	Apple II
	Word Wackey		Apple II
1978	3-D Docking Mission		Apple II
1978	Phasor Zap	Action	Apple II
1979	Lisa Interactive Assembler	Assembler	Apple II
1979	Football	Sports	Commodore 64
1979	Camera Obscura	Puzzle	Apple II
1980	Z-A-P	Action	Commodore PET
