= Anteater (video game) =

1982 video game

- Developer: Stern Electronics
- Publisher: Tago Electronics
- Designer: Chris Oberth
- Platform: Arcade
- Release: 1982
- Genre: Maze
- Modes: Single-player, multiplayer

Anteater (The Anteater in Britain, Ameisenbär in Germany) is an arcade video game designed by Chris Oberth and released in 1982 by Tago Electronics. The player steers the tongue of the eponymous creature through a maze, retracting it when dangers approach. Though the arcade game was not a hit, it spawned a number of direct clones for home computers; Sierra's Oils Well became better known than the original. Oberth wrote an Apple II version of his own game for Datamost using a different title.

== Gameplay ==
The anteater extending its tongue in a new level full of ant larvae (red dots)

The player controls an anteater that elongates its tongue through a maze-like ant colony in search of ants. Only the tip of the tongue can eat an ant. If an ant touches any other part of the tongue, then the player loses a life. Pressing the second button quickly retracts the anteater's tongue.

Worms can only be eaten from behind. Once the sun has traveled across the screen and night falls, a spider appears. The spider climbs down the anteater's tongue, taking a life if it reaches the tip. Eating queen ants at the bottommost part of the nest kills the spider, all ants (except queen ant), and all worms from the playfield.

The objective is to eat all of the larvae before time runs out, clearing the screen. Each larva is worth 10 points. Each ant is worth 100 points, while eating a worm is worth 200. Queen ants are worth 1,000. After losing a life or finishing a level, a bonus of 10 points for each ant eaten is multiplied by the number of worms eaten (for example, eating 5 ants and 2 worms = 50 x 2 = 100).

== Ports ==
The game was ported to the Atari 2600 by Mattel in 1983 but never published. No official ports were released but Datamost's Ardy The Aardvark (1983), which is almost identical, was written for the Apple II by Anteater creator Chris Oberth. That game was converted to the Commodore 64 and Atari 8-bit computers by Jay Ford.

== Legacy ==
Sierra's 1983 home clone, Oil's Well, was re-themed to be about drilling for oil and was heavily promoted. It sparked its own clones: Pipeline Run for the Commodore 64 in 1990 and Oilmania for the Atari ST and Amiga in 1991 and 1992, respectively. Other clones of Anteater are Bug-Byte’s Aardvark (1986), Jack the Digger (1986) for the Atari 8-bit computers and Blue Ribbon's Diamond Mine (1984) and Diamond Mine II (1985).

The current arcade high score holder is Maria Blasucci.
