= Golden Tee Golf =

Video game series

- Series logo
- Genre: Sports
- Developer: Incredible Technologies
- Creators: Larry Hodgson, Jim Zielinski
- Platforms: Arcade, PlayStation, iOS, Microsoft Windows, Android
- First release: Golden Tee Golf; 1989
- Latest release: Golden Tee PGA TOUR 2027; September 28, 2026

Golden Tee Golf is a golf arcade game series by Incredible Technologies. Its signature feature is the use of a trackball to determine the power, direction and curve of the player's golf shot. Play modes include casual 18-hole golf, closest to the pin, and online tournaments. One of the longest running arcade game series, Golden Tee has maintained a large following and spawned a competitive tournament scene.

== History ==
The success of Golden Tee 3D started a succession of yearly releases for the franchise; here, the game illustrates its trackball-based controls.

The Golden Tee series began as a project at Incredible Technologies to create a large scale golf simulator for sizable family entertainment centers. The idea was scrapped, but not before programmer Larry Hodgson had already written software to create virtual golf courses. Rather than discard his work, Hodgson retooled the concept to develop a golf game for regular arcade cabinets. He worked with co-designer Jim Zielinski, who initially rendered the courses using Deluxe Paint. Instead of a regular joystick and buttons for controls, they used a trackball, which Incredible Technologies had previously used for Capcom Bowling.

The first Golden Tee was play-tested in a bar, a venue which would become the most popular location for Golden Tee cabinets. Released in 1989, the first iteration was sold exclusively as a kit that could be used to convert existing arcade machines to Golden Tee. It sold relatively well, but the series would find greater success with Golden Tee 3D several years later. The 1995 Peter Jacobsen's Golden Tee 3D Golf (featuring Peter Jacobsen) was the first in the series to support online networked play. Rather than being networked to each other, the cabinets were all linked to a central computer which compared scores for tournament play. The first test tournament, held on 24 game cabinets in the Chicago area from November 24 to December 17, 1995, awarded real money to the winners, including a $1,000 grand prize. The first "real world" tournament was held mid-June to July 7, 1996, on 145 cabinets across six states, and was considered a major success. By the end of 1996, 1,250 cabinets were installed across 32 states. The tournament gave rise to a large competitive play scene for the franchise. Ryan Bourgeois has won the US national championship three times.

Release timeline
1989	Golden Tee Golf
1990
1991
1992	Golden Tee Golf II
1993
1994
1995	Peter Jacobsen's Golden Tee 3D Golf
1996	Golden Tee ’97
1997	Golden Tee ’98
1997	Golden Tee ’98 Tournament Edition
1998	Golden Tee ’99
1998	Golden Tee ’99 Tournament Edition
1999	Golden Tee 2K
1999	Golden Tee Royal Edition Tournament
2000	Golden Tee Fore!
2001	Golden Tee Classic
2001	Golden Tee Fore! 2002
2002	Golden Tee Fore! 2003
2002	Golden Tee Supreme Edition Tournament
2003	Golden Tee Fore! 2004
2003	Golden Tee Fore! 2004 Extra
2004	Golden Tee Fore! 2005
2005	Golden Tee Fore! Complete
2005	Golden Tee LIVE
2006	Golden Tee LIVE 2007
2007	Golden Tee LIVE 2008
2008	Golden Tee 2008 Unplugged
2008	Golden Tee LIVE 2009
2009	Golden Tee 2009 Unplugged
2009	Golden Tee LIVE 2010
2010	Golden Tee 2010 Unplugged
2010	Golden Tee LIVE 2011
2011	Golden Tee 2011 Unplugged
2011	Golden Tee 2012 Home Edition
2011	Golden Tee LIVE 2012
2012	Golden Tee LIVE 2013
2013	Golden Tee LIVE 2014
2014	Golden Tee LIVE 2015
2015	Golden Tee LIVE 2016
2016	Golden Tee LIVE 2017
2017	Golden Tee Live 2018
2018	Golden Tee Live 2019
2019	Golden Tee Live 2020
2019	Golden Tee Golf (iOS)
2020	Golden Tee Live 2021
2021	Golden Tee Live 2022
2022	Golden Tee PGA Tour 2022
2022	Golden Tee PGA Tour Clubhouse Edition 2022
2023	Golden Tee PGA Tour 2023-2024
2023	Golden Tee PGA Tour Clubhouse Edition 2023-2024
2024	Golden Tee PGA Tour 2025
2024	Golden Tee PGA Tour Clubhouse Edition 2025
2025	Golden Tee Arcade Classics
2025	Golden Tee PGA Tour 2026
2026	Golden Tee PGA TOUR 2027
2026	Golden Tee PGA TOUR 2027 - Home Edition

Since Golden Tee 3D, Incredible Technologies has released a new entry in the series to arcades every year. Versions of the game have also been published for the original PlayStation, Microsoft Windows, iOS and Android. A plug-n-play dedicated console version has also been released. On May 16, 2022, Golden Tee PGA Tour 2022 was released. Later that year on October 24, Clubhouse Edition was released that was once the Home Edition. A standard model and a deluxe model was available. The standard was just the base and the deluxe came with the base, the TV (55") and the blue light marquee making it the same look as the commercial version. A compilation of several earlier series entries, Golden Tee Arcade Classics, was released by Atari in July 2025, marking the first official release of the Golden Tee games outside North America.

== See also ==
- PGA Tour Golf Team Challenge
- Golden Tee World Championships
- Golden Tee National Tour
