= Rescue (1982 video game) =

1982 video game

- Arcade flyer
- Developer: Universal Research Laboratories
- Publisher: Stern Electronics
- Designer: Chris Oberth
- Platform: Arcade
- Release: 1982
- Genre: Twin-stick shooter
- Modes: Single-player, multiplayer

Rescue is a 1982 twin-stick shooter video game developed and published by Stern Electronics for arcades. The player flies a helicopter over the open sea to rescue stranded paratroopers from enemy forces and sharks. As the player-controlled helicopter flies left and right, the cloud layers move at different rates, giving a parallax scrolling effect.

In 2023, Atari SA acquired the rights to twelve Stern Electronics video games including Rescue.

== Gameplay ==
The player pilots a helicopter over a body of water. Paratroopers drop from the top of the screen and land in the water. They can be picked up by carefully hovering so a short ladder drops, and they climb in. Being slightly too low and touching the water loses a life. A falling paratrooper is killed if it hits the player's helicopter.

Enemy helicopters attack the player and can be shot by moving the second joystick. The falling wreckage is deadly. A "bomb" button releases a projectile straight down for destroying sharks and submarines targeting paratroopers waiting for rescue.

== Reception ==
Electronic Games reviewed Rescue in 1982. The reviewer commented: "With Rescue, everything ties together in a neat package that's not only fun to play, but increasingly challenging the further you're able to go into the mission."
