= Stern Electronics =

American arcade and pinball company

Stern Electronics, Inc.
- Type: Private
- Industry: Video games
- Founded: December 1976
- Defunct: February 1985
- Fate: Chapter 7 liquidation
- Successor: Stern Pinball, Inc. (founded as Data East Pinball)
- Headquarters: Chicago, Illinois, United States
- Key people: Sam Stern; Gary Stern
- Products: Arcade video games, pinball machines

Stern Electronics, Inc. was an American video game developer and publisher best known for the 1980 arcade game Berzerk. Its intellectual properties are currently owned by Atari.

== History ==
Stern Electronics was formed when Sam and Gary Stern bought the assets of Chicago Coin in December 1976. Sam previously owned half of amusements manufacturer Williams between 1947 and 1964, when he sold his stake to the Seeburg Corporation. Gary had trained under his father at Williams, and from 1973-1976 the two ran the company. Stern Electronics, Inc. acquired their core inventory by purchasing Chicago Coin's assets at bankruptcy sales. As a separate company, they did not assume any of the debt Chicago Coin had amassed. All the stock in this new company was held by Gary Stern and his brother David Stern. In September 1977 Stern acquired Universal Research Laboratories after they went bankrupt a few months earlier. Universal Research Laboratories manufactured circuit boards for Bally pinball machines, and then reverse engineered these for Stern, who were then sued by Bally. An agreement to pay royalties was reached which by September 1981 totaled $700,000.

The first two games released by Stern were Stampede and Rawhide, pre-existing games from Chicago Coin with updated Stern branding. They produced their first solid-state pinball machine, called Pinball that year. By 1978, they had switched over to fully solid-state electronics for their games, building up to 170 pinball machines a day. In July 1980, Stern acquired the jukebox production assets of the bankrupt Seeburg Corporation for $1.5 million. Stern sought to increase sales in the declining jukebox market by modernizing machines with the addition of screens and customizable displays. In late 1980 Stern purchased the August J. Johnson Co., a Bensenville, Illinois based cabinet manufacturer.

In 1980, as a response to the increased popularity of video games across American arcades, Stern Electronics developed and manufactured Berzerk, which sold 20,000 cabinets, and stopped producing pinball machines in 1982. However, Stern became one of many victims of the North American Video Game Crash of 1983. They received financial support to continue operations from machine distributor Al Simon and sold Seeburg in March of 1984. In late 1984, Sam Stern died and Stern Electronics closed on February 1, 1985.

On March 16, 2023, Atari SA announced that it had acquired the intellectual property rights to 12 Stern Electronics titles, including Berzerk and Frenzy.

== Stern Pinball, Inc. ==
From 1985 to 1986, personnel from Stern Electronics formed a venture known as Pinstar that produced conversion kits for old Bally and Stern machines, with Gary Stern continuing to function as president. He then went on to help found Data East's pinball division in November 1986 and continued to lead there when it was acquired by Sega in 1994. While Data East did operate out of the old Stern Electronics property, sources differ on whether they acquired the company or just the facilities.

By 1999, the pinball industry was virtually dead. Sega (which had acquired Data East Pinball in late 1994 and renamed it to Sega Pinball), left the pinball industry by spinning off their pinball division and selling it to Gary Stern, and Stern Pinball was born. Stern Pinball became the only commercial pinball manufacturer left, but continued to struggle in the 2000s, producing just 10,000 machines per year and selling the majority of them overseas.

As of 2023, longtime designers Brian Eddy, John Borg, and George Gomez are designing pinball games at Stern Pinball, alongside top-ranking competitive player Keith Elwin and popular pinball streamer Jack Danger. Stern Pinball, Inc. is based in Elk Grove Village, Illinois.

Some Stern pinball tables were also digitally released through The Pinball Arcade and Stern Pinball Arcade.

== List of games ==
=== Pinball ===
- Stampede (1977)
- Rawhide (1977)
- Disco (1977)
- Pinball (1977)
- Stingray (1977)
- Stars (1978)
- Memory Lane (1978)
- Lectronamo (1978)
- Wild Fyre (1978)
- Nugent (1978)
- Dracula (1979)
- Trident (1979)
- Genesis (1979) (shuffle alley)
- Hot Hand (1979)
- Magic (1979)
- Cosmic Princess (1979) (Produced in Australia by Leisure and Allied Industries under license from Stern Electronics Inc)
- Meteor (1979) (Highest production of all Stern Electronics' Pinballs)
- Galaxy (1980)
- Ali (1980)
- Big Game (1980) (First game to incorporate seven-digit scoring in the digital era)
- Seawitch (1980)
- Cheetah (1980)
- Quicksilver (1980)
- Star Gazer (1980)
- Flight 2000 (1980) (Stern's first game with multi-ball and speech)
- Nine Ball (1980)
- Freefall (1981)
- Lightning (1981)
- Split Second (1981)
- Catacomb (1981)
- Viper (1981)
- Dragonfist (1982)
- Iron Maiden (1982) (Unrelated to the British heavy metal band)
- Orbitor 1 (1982) (Featured a 3d-vacuum formed playfield with spinning rubber bumpers causing frenetic ball action; it was the company's last released pinball game)
- Cue (1982) (Six machines built)
- Lazer Lord (1984) (One prototype built)
- Black Beauty (1984) (shuffle alley)

=== Arcade video games ===
- Astro Invader (1980) (developed by Konami)
- Berzerk (1980)
- The End (1980) (developed by Konami)
- Scramble (1981) (developed by Konami)
- Super Cobra (1981) (developed by Konami)
- Moon War (1981)
- Turtles (1981) (developed by Konami)
- Strategy X (1981) (developed by Konami)
- Jungler (1981) (developed by Konami)
- Armored Car (1981)
- Amidar (1981) (developed by Konami)
- Frenzy (1982)
- Tazz-Mania (1982)
- Tutankham (1982) (developed by Konami)
- Pooyan (1982) (developed by Konami)
- Rescue (1982)
- Calipso (1982) (developed by Stern, released by Tago Electronics)
- Anteater (1982) (developed by Stern, released by Tago Electronics)
- Mazer Blazer (1982)
- Lost Tomb (1982)
- Bagman (Le Bagnard) (1982) (developed by Valadon Automation)
- Pop Flamer (1982) (developed by Jaleco)
- Journey (1982) (Never commercially released) (Note: Not to be confused with Journey, another arcade game released by Bally/Midway in 1983. Unlike the Stern game, this Journey, which is based on the rock band of the same name, received a wide release.)
- Dark Planet (1983)
- Star Jacker (1983) (developed by Sega)
- Minefield (1983)
- Cliff Hanger (1983) (LaserDisc game using video footage from TMS)
- Great Guns (1984)
- Goal to Go (1984) (LaserDisc game)
- Super Bagman (1984) (developed by Valadon Automation)
