= Trackball =

Pointing device

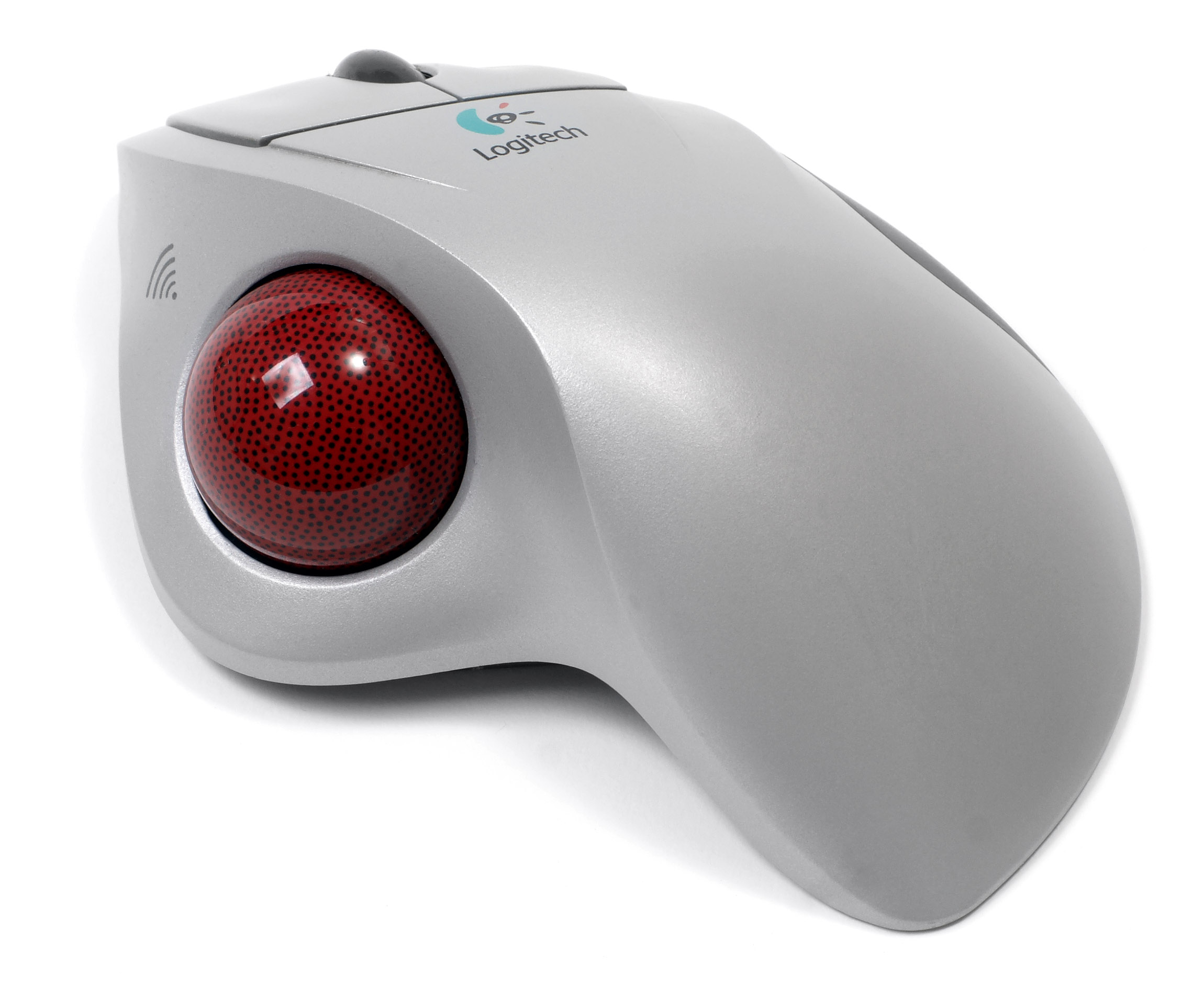
Logitech Cordless TrackMan Wheel trackball mouse

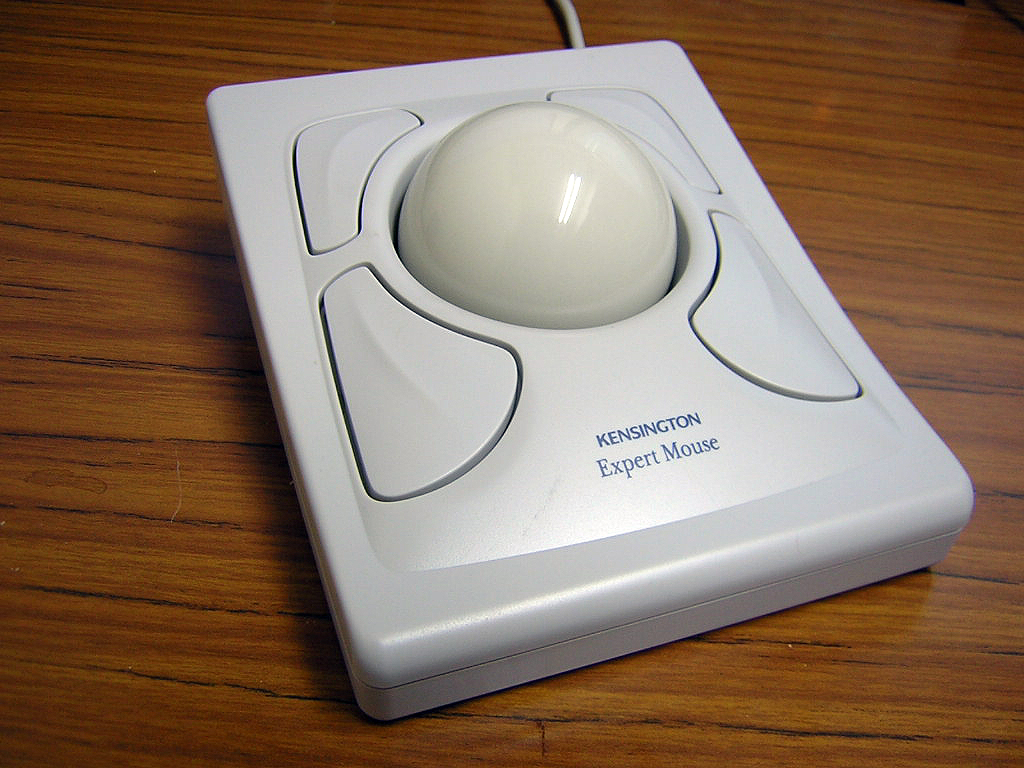
The original version of the Kensington Expert Mouse can use a US-size billiard ball as a trackball.

A trackball is a pointing device consisting of a ball held by a socket containing sensors to detect a rotation of the ball about two axes—like an upside-down ball mouse with an exposed protruding ball. Users roll the ball to position the on-screen pointer, using their thumb, fingers, or the palm of the hand, while using the fingertips to press the buttons.

With most trackballs, operators have to lift their finger, thumb or hand and reposition it on the ball to continue rolling, whereas a mouse would have to be lifted itself and re-positioned. Some trackballs have notably low friction, as well as being made of a dense material such as phenolic resin, so they can be spun to make them coast. The trackball's buttons may be in similar positions to those of a mouse, or configured to suit the user.

Large trackballs are common on CAD workstations for easy precision. Before the advent of the touchpad, small trackballs were common on portable computers and smartphones (such as a BlackBerry) where there may be no desk space on which to run a mouse. Some small "thumballs" are designed to clip onto the side of the keyboard and have integral buttons with the same function as mouse buttons.

== History ==
The trackball was invented as part of a post-World War II-era radar plotting system named Comprehensive Display System (CDS) by Ralph Benjamin when working for the British Royal Navy Scientific Service. Benjamin's project used analog computers to calculate the future position of target aircraft based on several initial input points provided by a user with a joystick. Benjamin felt that a more elegant input device was needed and invented a ball tracker system called the roller ball for this purpose in 1946. The device was patented in 1947, but only a prototype using a metal ball rolling on two rubber-coated wheels was ever built and the device was kept as a military secret. Production versions of the CDS used joysticks.

The CDS system had also been viewed by a number of engineers from Ferranti Canada, who returned to Canada and began development of the Royal Canadian Navy's DATAR system in 1952. Principal designers Tom Cranston, Fred Longstaff and Kenyon Taylor chose the trackball as the primary input, using a standard five-pin bowling ball as the roller. DATAR was similar in concept to Benjamin's display, but used a digital computer to calculate tracks, and sent the resulting data to other ships in a task force using pulse-code modulation radio signals.

DATAR's trackball used four disks to pick up motion, two each for the X and Y directions. Several additional rollers provided mechanical support. When the ball was rolled, the pickup discs spun and contacts on their outer rim made periodic contact with wires, producing pulses of output with each movement of the ball. By counting the pulses, the physical movement of the ball could be determined.

Since 1966, the American company Orbit Instrument Corporation produced a device named X-Y Ball Tracker, a trackball, which was embedded into radar flight control desks.

A similar trackball device at the German Bundesanstalt für Flugsicherung was constructed by a team around Rainer Mallebrein of Telefunken Konstanz as part of the development for the Telefunken computer infrastructure around the main frame TR 440, process computer TR 86 and video terminal SIG 100-86, which began in 1965. This trackball was called Rollkugel (German for "rolling ball"). Somewhat later, the idea of "reversing" this device led to the introduction of the first computer ball mouse (still named Rollkugel, model RKS 100-86), which was offered as an alternative input device to light pens and trackballs for Telefunken's computer systems since 1968.

In later trackball models the electrical contacts were replaced by an optical chopper wheel, which had small slots cut into it in rather than electrical contacts. With an LED for illumination from one side and an optical sensor on the other, rotation of the wheel periodically blocks and unblocks the light, so the sensor produces electrical pulses to indicate that rotation is occurring.

Mice used the same basic system for determining motion, but had the problem that the ball was in contact with the desk or mousepad. In order to provide smooth motion the balls were often covered with an anti-slip surface treatment, which was, by design, sticky. Rolling the mouse tended to pick up any dirt and drag it into the system where it would clog the chopper wheels, demanding cleanup. In contrast the trackball is in contact only with the user's hand, which tends to be cleaner. In the late 1990s both mice and trackballs began using direct optical tracking which follows dots on the ball, avoiding the need for anti-slip surface treatment.

As with modern mice, most trackballs now have an auxiliary device primarily intended for scrolling. Some have a scroll wheel like most mice, but the most common type is a “scroll ring” which is spun around the ball. Kensington's SlimBlade Trackball similarly tracks the ball itself in three dimensions for scrolling.

As of 1989 and into the 2020s, two major companies developed and produce consumer trackballs, Logitech and Kensington, although Logitech has narrowed its product line to two models. Other smaller companies occasionally offer a trackball in their product line. Microsoft produced popular models including The Microsoft Trackball Explorer, but has since discontinued all of its products.

== Special applications ==
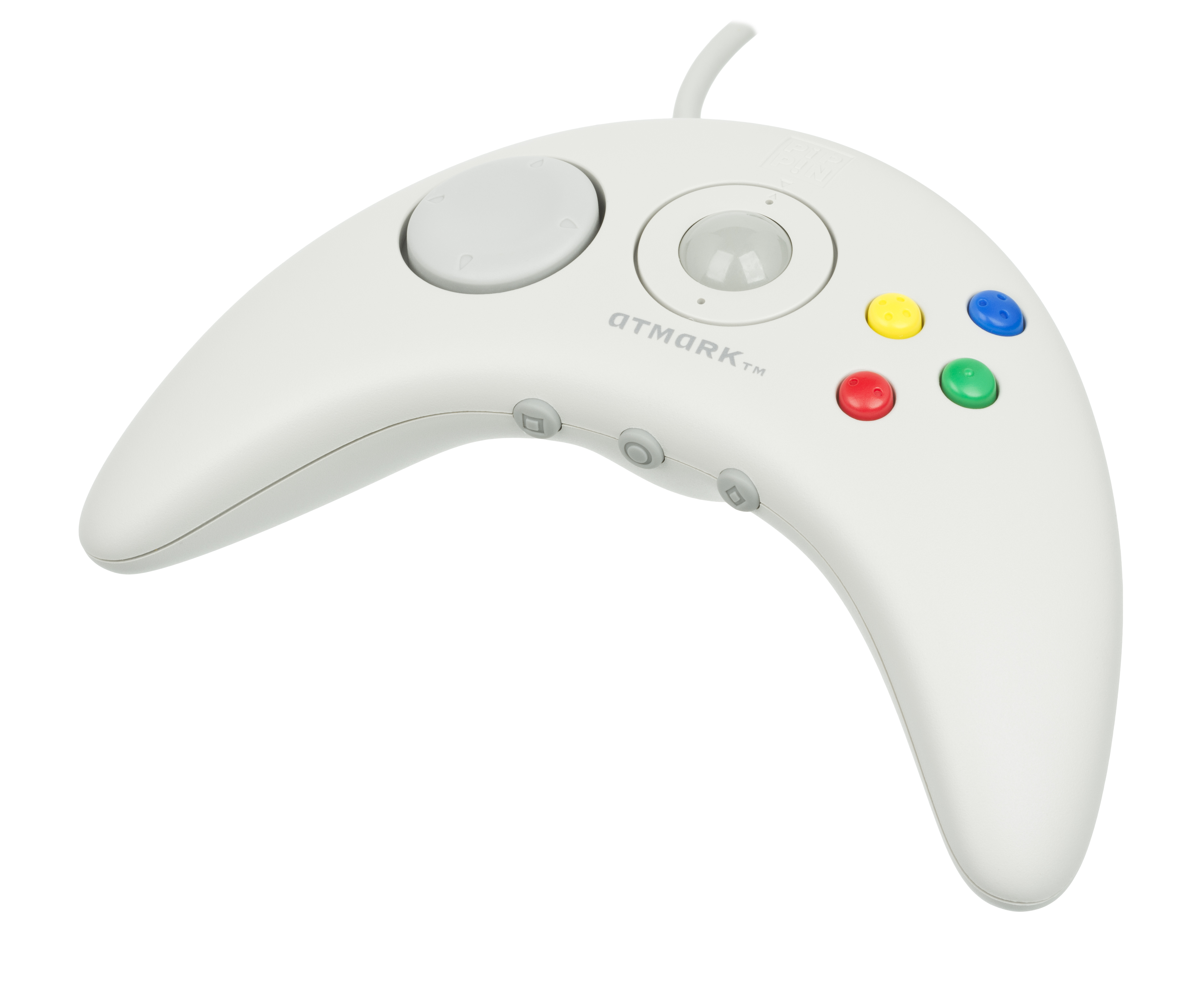
An Apple Pippin gamepad with a trackball

Large trackballs are sometimes seen on computerized special-purpose workstations, such as the radar consoles in an air-traffic control room or sonar equipment on a ship or submarine. Modern installations of such equipment may use mice instead, since most people now already know how to use one. However, military mobile anti-aircraft radars, commercial airliners (such as Airbus A380 and Airbus A350) and submarine sonars tend to continue using trackballs, since they can be made more durable and more fit for fast emergency use. Large and well made ones allow easier high precision work, for which reason they may still be used in these applications (where they are often called "tracker balls") and in computer-aided design.

Trackballs have appeared in video games, particularly early arcade video games (see a List of trackball arcade games). In March 1978, Sega released World Cup, an association football game with trackball controls. In October 1978, Atari released Atari Football, which popularized the use of a trackball, with the game's developers mentioning it was inspired by an earlier Japanese association football game. Other notable trackball games include Atari's Centipede and Missile Command; Atari trademarked it "TRAK-BALL".

Console trackballs, now fairly rare, were common in the early 1980s: the Atari 2600 and 5200 consoles, as well as the competing ColecoVision console, though using a joystick as their standard controller, each had one as an optional peripheral. The Apple Pippin, a console introduced in 1996, had a trackball built into its gamepad as standard. Trackballs were occasionally used in e-sports prior to the mainstreaming of optical mice in the early 2000s because they were more reliable than ball mice, but now they are extremely rare because optical mice offer superior speed and precision. Trackballs remain in use in pub golf machines (such as Golden Tee Golf) to simulate swinging the club.

Trackballs have also been regarded as excellent complements to analog joysticks, as pioneered by the Assassin 3D, a trackball released in 1996 with joystick pass-through capability. Later in 1996, Mad Catz released the Panther XL, which was based on the Assassin 3D. This combination provides for two-hand aiming and a high accuracy and consistency replacement for the traditional mouse and keyboard combo generally used on first-person shooter games. Many such games natively support joysticks and analog player movement, like Valve's Half-Life and id Software's Quake series. As of 2020, one professional eSport player was known for using a trackball.

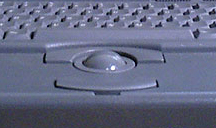
A trackball mouse on an Apple PowerBook 145 laptop computer

Trackballs are provided as the pointing device in some public internet access terminals. Unlike a mouse, a trackball can easily be built into a console, and cannot be ripped away or easily vandalized. Two examples are the Internet browsing consoles provided in some UK McDonald's outlets, and the BT Broadband Internet public phone boxes. This simplicity and ruggedness also makes them ideal for use in industrial computers.

Because trackballs for personal computers are stationary, they may require less space for operation than a mouse, simplifying use in confined or cluttered areas such as a small desk or a rack-mounted terminal. They are generally preferred in laboratory settings for the same reason.

Trackballs were often included in laptop computers, but since the late 1990s these have been replaced by touchpads and pointing sticks. Trackballs are still used as separate input devices with standard desktop computers, but this application is also moving to touchpads due to the prevalence of multi-touch gesture control in new desktop operating systems.

== Ergonomics ==
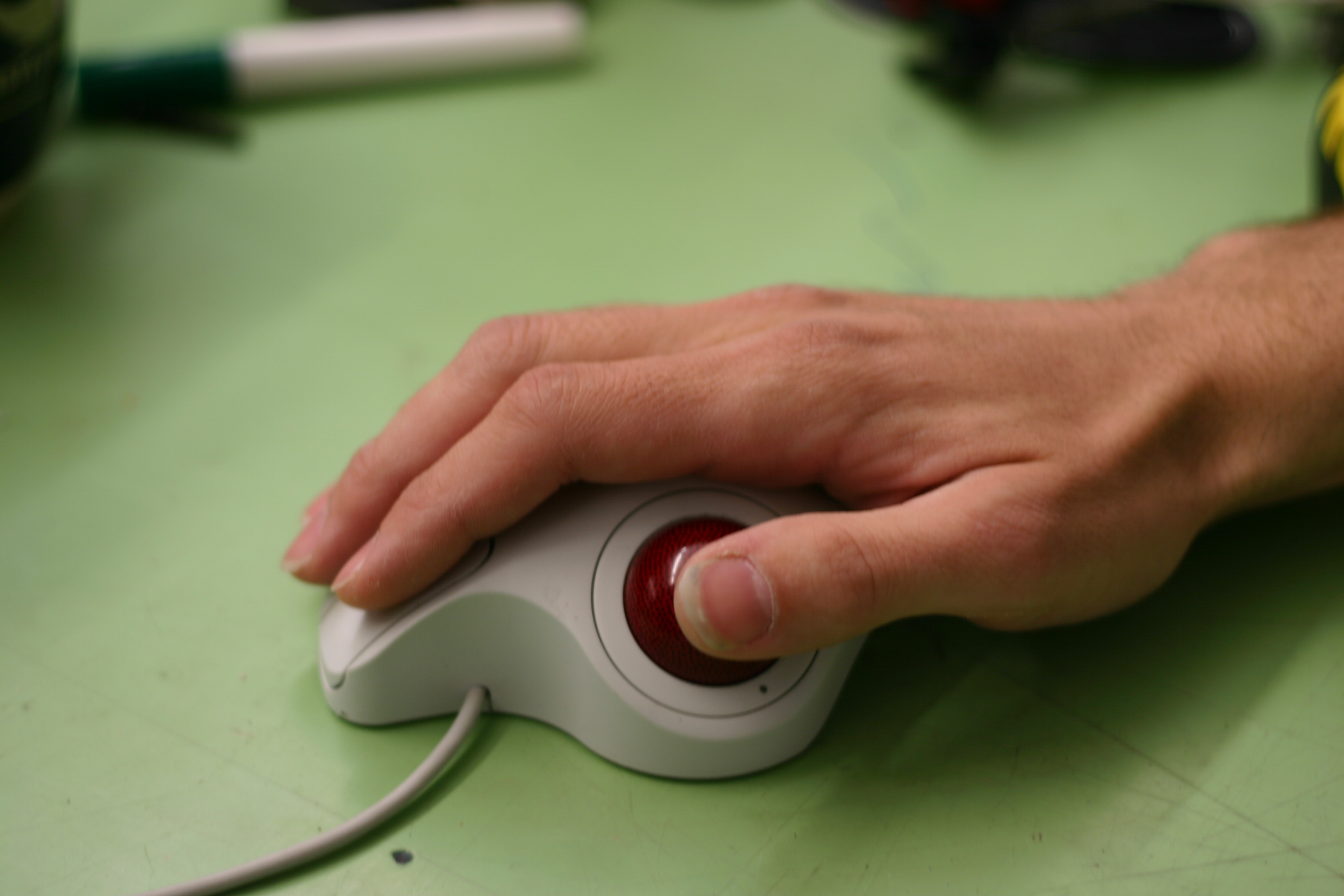
Logitech TrackMan Marble Wheel designed to use the ball with the thumb

People with a mobility impairment use trackballs as an assistive technology input device. Access to an alternative pointing device has become even more important for them with the dominance of graphically-oriented operating systems. There are many alternative systems to be considered. The control surface of a trackball is easier to manipulate and the buttons can be activated without affecting the pointer position.

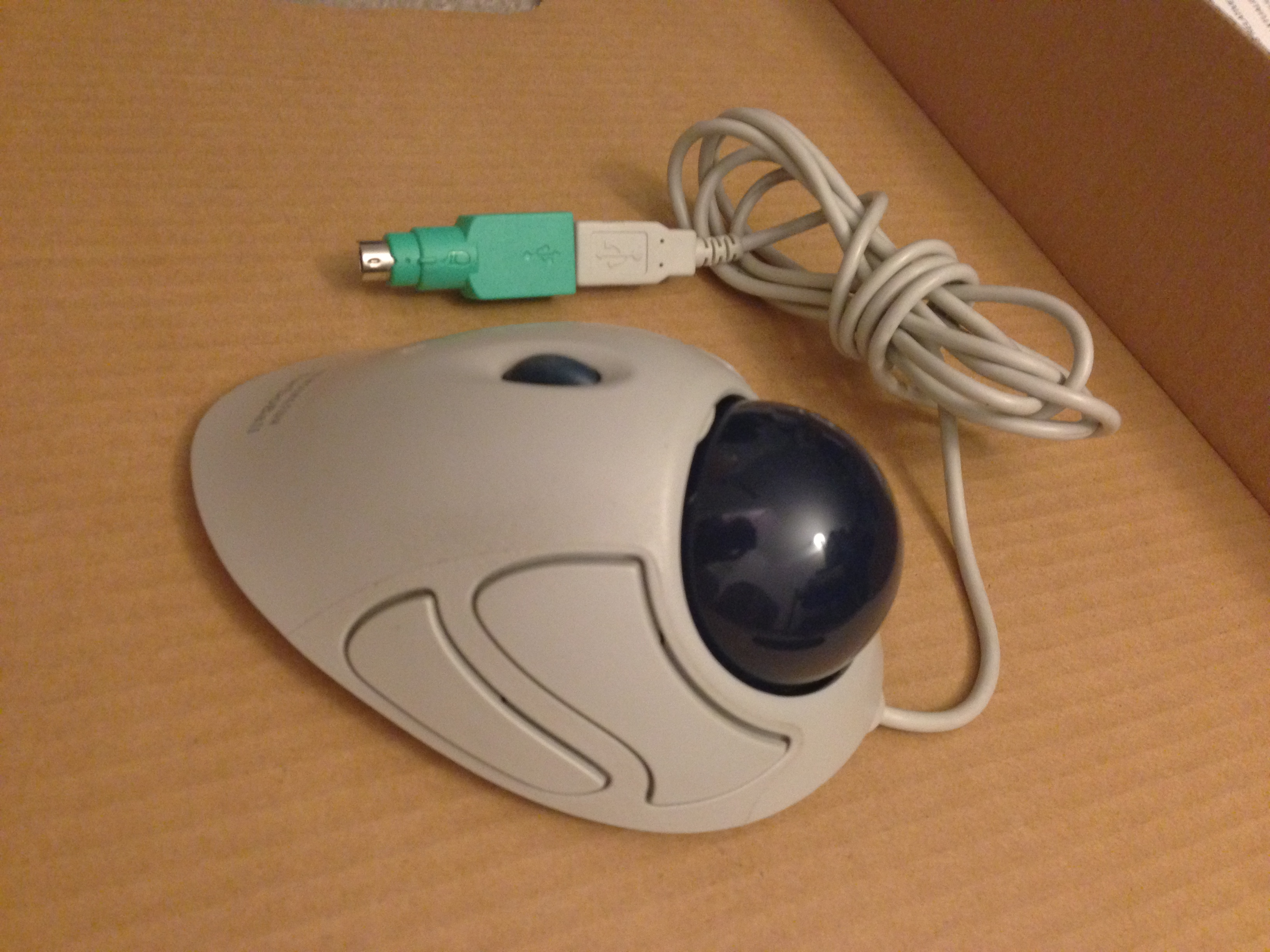
A Kensington TurboBall Mouse designed to use the ball with the index or middle finger

Trackball users also often state that they are not limited to using the device on a flat desk surface. Trackballs can be used whilst browsing a laptop in bed, or wirelessly from an armchair to a PC playing a movie. They are also useful for computing on boats or other unstable platforms where a rolling deck could produce undesirable input.

Trackballs are generally either thumb-operated, with a ball operated by the thumb, or finger-operated, with a ball usually operated by some combination of the index, middle and ring fingers. Depending on the design of the trackball, the fingers not operating the ball may manipulate other input devices built into the trackball, such as buttons and scroll wheels. Users favor one format or another for reasons of comfort, mobility, precision, or because it reduces strain on one part of the hand/wrist.

Some finger-operated trackballs are symmetrical in design, making them usable by both hands. However, installation of software and/or modification of firmware may be required to mirror the button inputs.

Thumb-operated trackballs and other finger-operated trackballs, are asymmetric, and usually available only in right-handed versions.

Some computer users prefer a trackball over the more common mouse for ergonomic reasons. There seems to be no conclusive evidence from studies performed to determine which type of pointing device works best for most applications. Application users are encouraged to test different devices, and to maintain proper posture and scheduled breaks for comfort. Some disabled users find trackballs easier since they only have to move their thumb relative to their hand, instead of moving the whole hand, while others incur unacceptable fatigue of the thumb. Elderly people sometimes have difficulty holding a mouse still while double-clicking; the trackball allows them to let go of the ball while using the button.

At times when a user is browsing menus or websites rather than typing, it is also possible to hold a trackball in the right hand like a television remote control, operating the ball with the right thumb and pressing the buttons with the left thumb, thus giving the fingers a rest.

== Mobile devices ==
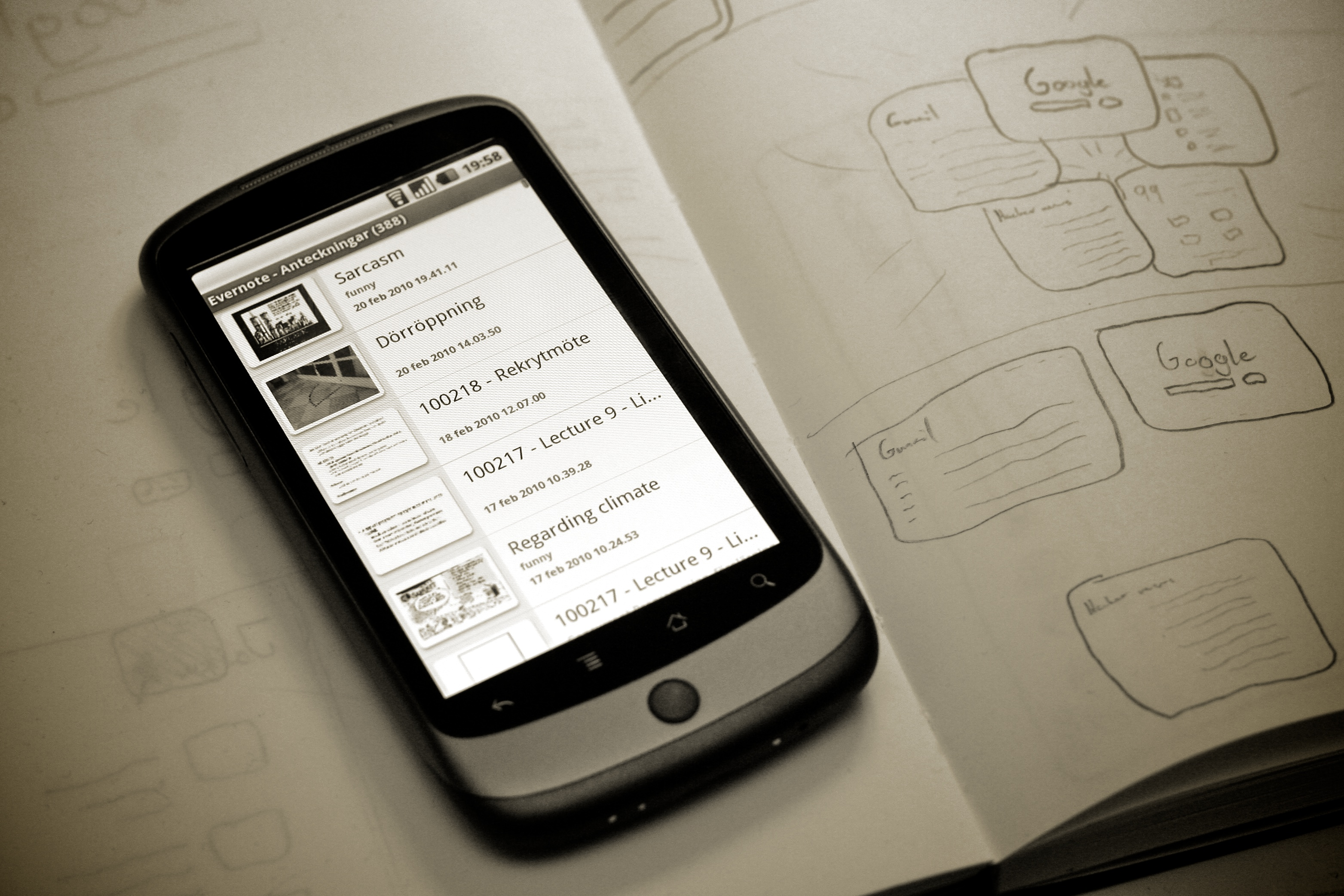
Nexus One with a trackball

Some mobile devices had trackballs, including those in the BlackBerry range, the T-Mobile Sidekick 3, and many early HTC smartphones. These miniature trackballs were made to fit within the thickness of a mobile device, and were controlled by the tip of a finger or thumb. These have mostly been replaced on smartphones by touch screens, although on the BlackBerry range they were replaced by an "optical trackball" or "optical trackpad" before later being replaced with touch screens.

== On mice ==
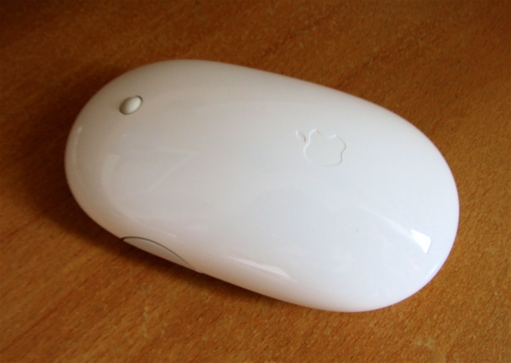
Mighty Mouse with scroll ball in lieu of scroll wheel

In lieu of a scroll wheel, some conventional mice include a tiny trackball sometimes called a scroll ball. A popular example is Apple's Mighty Mouse. Mice with a larger trackball on a side may be designed to stay stationary, using the trackball to move the mouse cursor instead of moving the mouse.

== See also ==
- Touchpad
- Pointing stick
- Mechanical mouse
