= Twin-stick shooter =

Video game genre

Twin-stick shooter, also known as dual-stick shooter, is a subgenre of shoot 'em up video games. It is defined as a multidirectional shooter in which the player character is controlled using two joysticks: one for movement on a flat plane and the other to shoot in the direction the joystick is pushed. Usually shots are fired as soon as the second joystick is moved, but in some games there is an additional button which must be held. Keyboard and mouse or touch input may supplant one or both joysticks. A few games, such as 1981's Vanguard, don't have a second joystick for shooting, but provide four buttons to fire in the cardinal directions.

The twin-stick control scheme was used in arcade video games starting with Gun Fight in 1975, but came into prominence with the high-action Robotron: 2084 in 1982. The ubiquity of gamepads with two thumb-controlled analog sticks overcame the difficulty of playing twin-stick shooters at home and eventually led to a resurgence of the genre following the release of Geometry Wars: Retro Evolved in 2005.

== History ==
The 1975 arcade video game Gun Fight (released as Western Gun in Japan) uses one joystick for movement and a second for firing. Each joystick is of different design. Unlike most later twin-stick games, the right stick moves the player's avatar. The 1977 sequel, Boot Hill, uses the same control scheme. Mars, a scrolling shooter released in 1981, is also controlled via two 8-way joysticks. The 1979 Nintendo arcade shooter Sheriff used an 8-way joystick for movement and a dial knob for 8-directional aiming. The 1981 SNK game Vanguard uses a joystick for movement and four separate buttons arranged in a diamond for firing.

Robotron: 2084, released in 1982 during the golden age of arcade video games, became the seminal example of the control scheme using two 8-way joysticks. As gamepads with dual thumbsticks did not exist on 8-bit or 16-bit home computers and consoles, home ports of Robotron: 2084 were often awkward to play or used modified control methods. The version for Atari 8-bit computers came with a plastic tray to hold two Atari CX40 joysticks, in an attempt to make twin-sticks viable. The 1991 Lynx conversion provides a choice of three methods for controlling the game via single directional pad and two buttons.

The twin-joystick arcade games Space Dungeon and Rescue were released the same year as Robotron, then Black Widow in 1983 and Cloak & Dagger in 1984. Twin-stick controls remained uncommon, but were later used in Smash TV (1990) and Total Carnage (1992). Smash TV designer Eugene Jarvis previously co-designed Robotron with Larry DeMar.

Geometry Wars: Retro Evolved, an early hit for the Xbox 360, caused a resurgence in 2005. By 2008, the popularity of the genre waned, following a glut of twin-stick shooters with abstract graphics from independent developers who found the simplicity of the genre appealing. However, titles like Mountain Sheep's 2009 game Minigore and its 2012 sequel Minigore 2: Zombies, and Angry Mob Games' 2010 Guerrilla Bob, both published by Chillingo, attracted critical acclaim and cult followings. Twin-stick shooter spin-offs of existing video game franchises have since been made, including Halo: Spartan Assault.
