= Diner (pinball) =

1990 pinball machine

- A promotional flyer released by Williams
- Manufacturer: Williams
- Release date: September 1990
- System: Williams System 11C
- Design: Mark Ritchie
- Programming: Jim Strompolis
- Artwork: Mark Sprenger
- Mechanics: Jack Skalon
- Music: Chris Granner
- Sound: Rich Karstens
- Voices: Chris Granner, Mark Ritchie, Steve Ritchie
- Effects: Brian Eddy
- Production run: 3,552 (approximate)

Diner is a pinball machine produced by Williams in 1990. The objective of the game is to serve all customers in a diner. The table was marketed with the slogan "It's fresh! It's fast! It's hot!"

== Design ==
The game is set in an American style diner. The inspiration for this table began with Mark Ritchie visiting the Henry Ford museum and seeing a Pullman railroad dining car. Python Anghelo drew some sketches for a game with the suggested title International Cafe, but was rejected by the game designer. An episode of Leave it to Beaver where the lead character falls into a giant cup of soup inspired Mark Ritchie to place an "endless cup of coffee" at the top of the playfield.

The backglass has transparent windows in the diner, with characters mounted on springs. To choose the characters Mark Ritchie wrote several names on a dartboard and threw darts at it to select them. The customers at the diner are Boris (Boris Yeltsin), Babs (Margaret Thatcher), PePe (Manuel Noriega), Buck (George Bush), and Haji. Haji is not based on a real person and was added at the request of Chris Granner, who recorded the voice.

The voice of Babs is performed by Trudy Ritchie, the wife of Mark Ritchie.

Diner is considered by some to be a spiritual successor to Taxi, as a few design elements are shared between the two games.

== Layout ==
The plunger lane leads to three rollovers labelled E-A-T after passing a jukebox. Below these are three pop bumpers in a triangular formation. The game has two ramps, and the right ramp can divert the ball to a cup.

Below the pop bumpers is a bank of three drop-targets, with a further bank below and to the left of the entrance to the left ramp; each drop target has an image of a food or drink item that can be ordered by the characters.

To the right of the right ramp is a short lane ending in a saucer, called "today's special". Lights representing each character are arranged in an arc near the bottom of the playfield.

== Gameplay ==
The game is controlled by two flippers, and has a manual plunger. The jukebox awards the value shown on it as a skillshot when the ball is launched. The player can serve all 5 customers (Haji, Babs, Boris, Pepe, and Buck) by completing drop targets to light the "Dine Time" jackpot. The game includes a clock on the backglass, numbered 1-12 displaying the Dine-Time millions.

Shooting the right ramp collects letters in D-I-N-E-R, when completed a further shot swirls around the cup and awards points based on the number of revolutions in the cup. The game has a multiball which the player can start by making an additional shot after a ball is locked from hitting the left ramp after spelling D-I-N-E-R.

== Reception ==
In an announcement for this game RePlay magazine said "if you liked Taxi, you'll love Diner".

== Digital versions ==
FarSight Studios released Diner for The Pinball Arcade in 2014, and it was available until June 30, 2018, when all Williams tables were removed for purchase due to licensing issues.

Diner released for Pinball FX on April 30, 2026.
