= Indiana Jones: The Pinball Adventure =

1993 pinball machine

- Manufacturer: Williams
- Release date: August 1993
- System: Williams WPC (DCS)
- Model #: 50017
- Design: Mark Ritchie, Doug Watson
- Programming: Brian Eddy
- Artwork: Doug Watson
- Mechanics: Jack Skalon
- Music: Chris Granner
- Sound: Rich Karstens
- Voices: John Rhys-Davies (Sallah)
- Animation: Eugene Geer, Scott Slomiany
- Production run: 12,716

Indiana Jones: The Pinball Adventure is a 1993 widebody pinball game designed by Mark Ritchie (the younger brother of acclaimed pinball designer Steve Ritchie) and released by Williams. It is based on the first three Indiana Jones movies and is the second of WMS' SuperPin series of widebody games, releasing after The Twilight Zone and before Star Trek: The Next Generation. It is the first pinball machine to use the DCS sound system.

One of these machines, with a customized cabinet with wooden siderails and bamboo on the legs, was in the same location in Disneyland for about 30 years; most of that time it was the Indiana Jones Adventure Outpost, the shop for Indiana Jones Adventure. Until 2022 this cabinet was unique, when it inspired an almost identical recreation cabinet to be manufactured with slight improvements.

Another machine, simply titled Indiana Jones, was released in April 2008 by Stern Pinball. This includes elements from the fourth film, Indiana Jones and the Kingdom of the Crystal Skull in addition to the first three films.

== Design and licensing ==
The director of marketing at Williams, Roger Sharpe, was offered the opportunity to obtain the license from Lucasfilm for Star Wars or Indiana Jones for a pinball machine. He chose Indiana Jones because he believed it had greater commercial potential. The license for Star Wars was then granted to Data East who released Star Wars in December 1992.

Doug Watson and Mark Ritchie travelled to Skywalker Ranch and were allowed access to the archive of movie props before designing the table. Lucasfilm initially had the idea the table should be based on The Young Indiana Jones Chronicles, but were quickly persuaded by Roger Sharpe that it should be based on the films.

The likeness of Harrison Ford does not appear in the game, but Doug Watson created artwork of Indiana Jones (the character) without this. The design of the backglass includes an image inspired by each of the three films: the Ark of the Covenant, a Sankara Stone, and the Holy Grail, along with four characters.

This game is the first game to use Williams DCS Sound System, with the DCS system finalized a few weeks before this machine reached the prototype stage, and sound the last component to be integrated into the game. It features sound clips from the first three films. Though originally planned to use Harrison Ford's voice for the callouts, it was reasoned that most of his speech could be pulled from the movie soundtracks. The design team discovered that John Rhys-Davies was in Chicago shooting The Untouchables and wrote a script for him. In an approximately two hour recording session John Rhys-Davies (reprising his role as Sallah) provided new speech for the game. The game includes portions of John Williams score from the films rescored for the DCS sound system by Chris Granner over a six-week period using a E-mu Proteus 2 sample-playback synth in place of an orchestra.

Due to the complexity of the software Brian Eddy wrote compression routines to fit all the content.

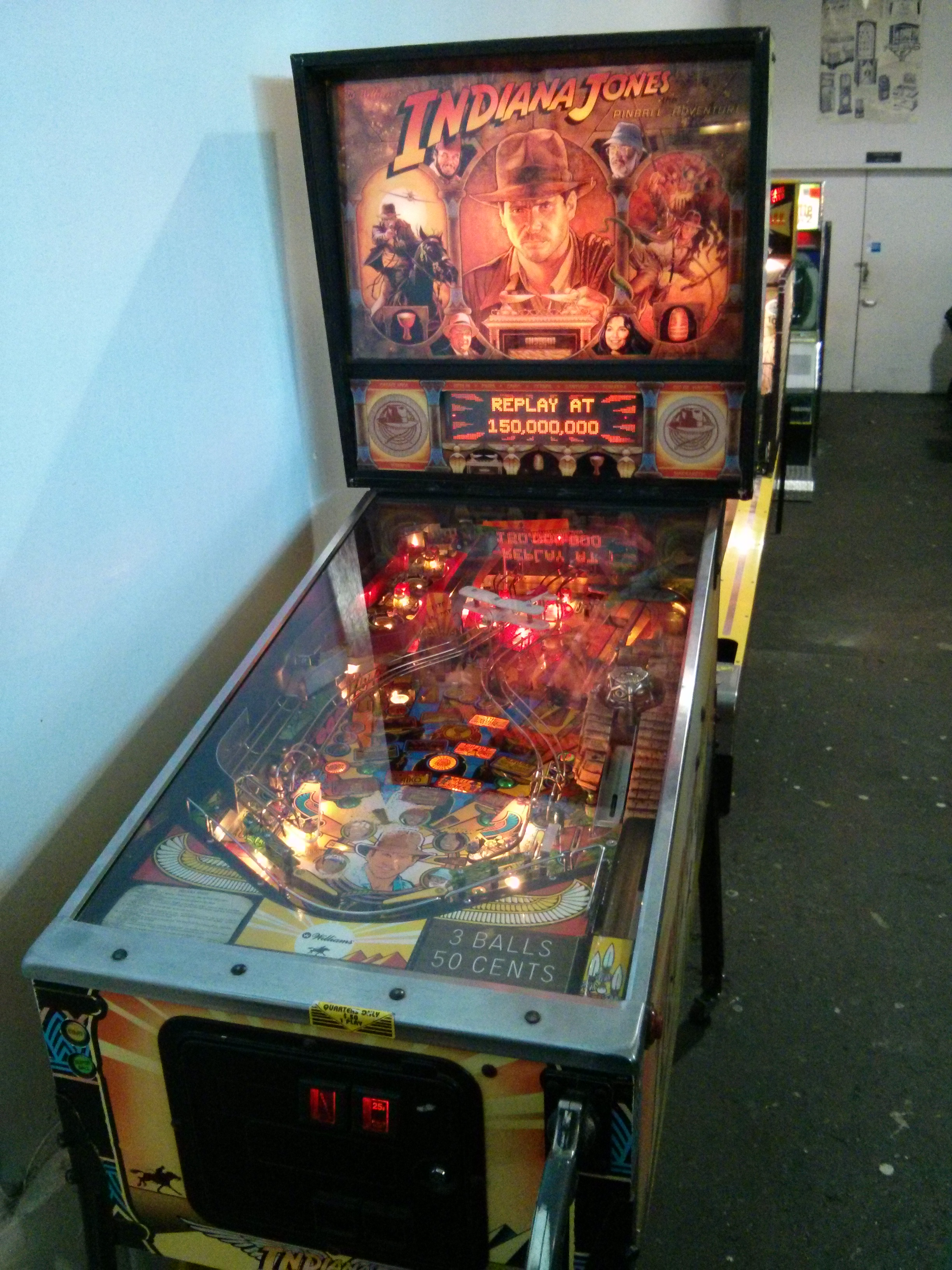
Indiana Jones: The Pinball Adventure at Musée Mécanique.

=== Notable features ===
Instead of a simple launch button, there is a Webley revolver shaped plunger with an inbuilt button, similar to that used on Terminator 2, and protected by the same patent.

A long upper mini-playfield, called the Path of Adventure, is located on the left side of the machine; this is reached from the right ramp and diverter. The ball is held momentarily by an up-post, and the player can steer the ball by tilting the mini-playfield left and right with the flipper buttons. This was added to the machine partway through development when it was decided not enough "toys" were in the game.

The ball trough was redesigned for this game to enable the 6-ball multiball, and became standard on future Williams games.

== Layout ==
The ball launches to hit one of four rollovers which are centrally located at the top of the playfield; just below these are three pop bumpers. The game has looping orbits on either side which can also reach these rollovers. There are two ramps, the left ramp returns the ball to the left flipper, and the right ramp has a 3-way diverter.

On either side of the playfield are three standup targets, and in the middle are three drop targets; collectively these spell ADVENTURE. Just to the left of the entrance to the left ramp is a saucer which is used to start main modes. Just to the left of the entrance to the right ramp is a lane with a drop target with a captive ball immediately behind it. During very early designs this was a 3-step drop target which dropped in stages, but due to reliability issues was changed to a standard drop target. Above the shooter lane is a rotating golden idol which is used at the start of some multiballs, with balls reaching it through a subway which starts at the lock shot behind the drop targets. At the bottom of the right outlane is a post which can be used to bounce the ball through a one-way gate back into the right inlane, scoring a "narrow escape".

Above the playfield are models of two planes, resembling a Stampe et Vertongen SV.4 biplane and a Messerschmitt Bf 109, from the dogfight in Indiana Jones and the Last Crusade.

== Gameplay ==
=== Modes ===
There are a total of 12 main modes, each of them based on a scene from the first three movies. These modes aren't stackable.

Raiders of the Lost Ark

- Get the Idol: The player has to get the idol by shooting the lock sinkhole.
- Raven Bar (video mode): The player shoots 20 Nazis to collect the medallion, and can collect an extra ball; the mode ends if they are shot five times.
- Streets of Cairo: Shoot the ramps and orbits to search for Marion under boxes (she's under the one the monkey is screeching on) - 10 million each if Marion is not underneath. Finding Marion alters the display to show Indy being menaced by a sword-wielding Arab. Can be killed in two ways: shooting the Start Mode saucer (adds 20 million points), or pressing the trigger on the plunger (adds 2 million points).
- Well of Souls: This is a six-ball multiball where a shot to the lock hole is worth 2 million points, multiplied by the number of balls in play.

Indiana Jones and the Temple of Doom

- Monkey Brains: Each loop and ramp shot is worth 8 million points.
- Steal the Stones: The player collects the stones by shooting the right ramp. Collecting the eight stones is worth 20 million points.
- Escape in the Mine Cart (video mode): Move the mine cart left and right through the tunnels, steering for the open tunnels and avoiding the closed ones. A 30 million point bonus is added at the end of the mode. Michigan J. Frog can be found in the mine.
- Survive the Rope Bridge: Successive ramp shots will move him further along and score 10 million each. Four ramps are required to get him across, and a fifth to cut the rope and get an extra ball.

Indiana Jones and the Last Crusade

- Castle Brunwald (misspelled as Grunewald): Shoot the drop target covering the captive ball, and then keep hitting the captive ball to escape the castle.
- Tank Chase: Shoot the left and right loops to pursue the tank; getting the last shot allows Indy to destroy the tank for a 30 million point bonus.
- Three Challenges: Shoot the right ramp for the Path to Adventure raised playfield. Challenges 1, 2, & 3 are completed by hitting all lit rollovers for 10 million, 20 million, and 30 million respectively. All lit rollovers have to be hit during one pass of the Path to collect the points.
- Choose Wisely (video mode): Five grails will appear on the display, and after they are shuffled around, the player chooses a grail. If the real grail is selected, the knight will say, "You have chosen wisely", and awards 20 million points. If the wrong grail is selected, an animation of the Nazi dying is seen, the knight will say, "You have chosen... poorly", and the player is awarded 5 million points.

=== Multiball ===
There are four multiball modes:

- Regular Multiball (3-ball): The player must hit the three drop targets covering the lock hole, and then shoot the lock hole to lock the ball inside the rotating idol head (located on the middle right of the playfield). If they lock a ball without hitting the drop targets, Shorty will say, "You cheat, Dr. Jones!" and are awarded 5 million points. After three balls are locked, multiball starts. During multiball, various targets increase the base jackpot value (20 million for the Ark, 30 million for the Stones, and 40 million for the Grail), and they have to shoot either the left ramp or the lock hole to light the jackpot. After that, they must shoot the right ramp within 15 seconds to collect the jackpot. During the jackpot countdown, if they have two or three balls are in play, they can shoot the second or third ball into the lock hole to double or triple the jackpot value. After collecting all three jackpots, the captive ball is lit for Super Jackpot (Base value: 80 million for the Ark, 90 million for the Stones, and 100 million for the Grail). Again, the player shoots the left ramp to light the Super Jackpot, and then hit the captive ball to collect the Super Jackpot.
- Quick Multiball (2-ball): The player have to hit the drop target (guarding the captive ball) on the upper right side of the playfield) twice, and within 15 seconds, to hit the captive ball to start Quick Multiball. Another ball is launched into play, and the goal is to keep hitting the captive ball for the following awards:
  - The Idol of The Incas (10 million) [features in the early part of Raiders of the Lost Ark]
  - The Diamond of Shanghai (15 million) [refers to the Peacock's Eye]
  - The Remains of Nurhaci (20 million) [features in the early part of Indiana Jones and the Temple of Doom]
  - The Cross of Coronado (25 million) [features in the early part of Indiana Jones and the Last Crusade]
  - The Fish of Tayles (30 million). This is a reference to Mark Ritchie's previous game, 1992's Fish Tales.
- Well of Souls (6-ball)
- Eternal Life (6-ball): Completing all 12 modes lights the "Start Mode" scoop for Eternal Life, a frenetic six-ball wizard mode. In this mode, all six balls are launched into play and the objective is to hit all the targets on the playfield (including the Path of Adventure mini-playfield and excluding the outlanes) with at least two balls in play to score a 1 Billion point bonus. At the start of Eternal Life, the "Eternal Life" ballsaver is active for a limited amount of time.

The bonus multiplier is increased by completing the I-N-D-Y rollovers, and is represented on the playfield with Indy's friends inserts - Shorty, Dr. Jones, Willie, Marion, and Sallah.

There is also a superball feature where the player can buy a ball for an extra credit, although this feature can be disabled by the operator.

== Reception ==
In a review for The Flipside the game was found to be enjoyable and similar to The Addams Family in that it could be considered to never be the same game twice. The superball feature was disliked.

Due to the importance of sound, Play Meter recommended placing it away from other machines whose sound could overpower it.

In a retro review in 2021 Pinball Mag called this machine Mark Ritchie's masterpiece.

== Digital Versions ==
Zen Studios simultaneously developed two versions of the table. One was developed in their PinFX engine for Pinball FX3 and released on March 10, 2022; the other was developed in Unreal Engine 4, and released as one of the main early access launch tables for Pinball FX on March 31, 2022. Both feature additional optional animations, including on the bottom of the playfield.

The table was the first third-party licensed Williams table made by Zen Studios that was not released on The Pinball Arcade. Due to the difficulty and expense in obtaining all licenses it released at a higher price point than all previous tables.
