= Sorcerer (pinball) =

1985 pinball machine

- Manufacturer: Williams
- Release date: March 1985
- System: Williams System 9
- Design: Mark Ritchie
- Programming: Dave Rzepka, Ed Suchocki
- Artwork: Pam Erickson
- Production run: 3,700

Sorcerer is a 1985 pinball machine designed by Mark Ritchie and released by Williams Electronics.

== Description ==
The artwork of Sorcerer is very colorful with orange and light yellow on a black cabinet. The backglass and playfield featuring the sorcerer and dragons. Several playfield plastics are extensions of the playfield art. The slingshot plastics represents a further part of the sorcerer's beard and the sorcerer's hand is depicted by the plastic over the targets. This design creates a 3D effect. The Sorcerer's eyes on the back plastic panel glow and flash along with the gameplay. The concept of these eyes was invented by Python Anghelo, and implemented by Pam Erickson. When the player earns an extra ball, a bell rings that sounds like an old fire alarm.

The game uses the same ramp assembly as Firepower II. The game uses numeric displays.

The game was seen as "demonic and evil" by some in the southern United States, impacting on sales in that region.

== Gameplay ==
Scoring is evenly split around the playfield, with ways to increase its values. The drop targets can be hit with the third flipper. Drop targets increase each inlane bonus value, and a third hit lights Extra Ball. The top rollovers advance the bonus multiplier. The playfield contains six standup targets that along with the 2 spinners can be hit to spell SORCERER. Once spelled, the spinners jump to 2500 points. A left ramp locks a first ball. A second ball up the ramp releases the first and second balls for 2-ball multiball. Subsequent ramp hits during multiball increase the playfield multiplier, from 2X to 3X to 5X.

== Digital versions ==
Sorcerer was one of 12 tables released on the arcade game UltraPin.

Sorcerer released for the Wii, PlayStation 3, PlayStation Portable, and the Xbox 360 versions of Pinball Hall of Fame: The Williams Collection between 2008 and 2009. The table was added to Pinball Hall of Fame's successor The Pinball Arcade on February 2, 2018, and removed from sale on June 30, 2018, due to the expiration of the developers Williams license.

== Legacy ==
Samples of sounds from this game are used on the hidden track on S.C.I.E.N.C.E., 1997 album by Incubus.
