= Police Force (pinball) =

1989 pinball machine

- Police Force flyer
- Manufacturer: Williams
- Release date: August 1989
- System: Williams System 11B
- Design: Mark Ritchie, Barry Oursler
- Programming: Bill Pfutzenreuter
- Artwork: Python Anghelo, John Youssi
- Mechanics: Joe Joos Jr., Jack Skalon, Irv Grabel
- Music: Chris Granner
- Sound: Chris Granner
- Production run: 4,751

Police Force is a Williams pinball machine released in August 1989.

== Design ==
The game was initially conceived based on Batman to coincide with the release of the 1989 Batman film, but Joe Kamikow for Data East secured the license to use Batman for a pinball machine. Python Anghelo had already drawn sketches including the Batcave, the Joker, and a toy Batmobile. Anghelo invented the concept of using anthropomorphic animals as police officers and criminals. The Batmobile was changed to a police car, the B-A-T-M-A-N lights on the playfield changed to P-O-L-I-C-E, and the batcave became the jail. Due to time constraints, Barry Oursler aided the design, adding a central ramp.

Most of the voices are by Mark Ritchie, with a few by Chris Granner.

The game was designed purely for novice players.

=== Artwork ===
The backglass has similarities with that of High Speed. It shows two armed animal police officers looking out of a vehicle, and the shark, crocodile, rat, and weasel criminals in a street. The taxi cab from Taxi is shown at the end of the street, and a snail representing the golden ratio is crossing the street.

== Rules ==
The game features anthropomorphic jungle animals in the roles of cops and robbers, and stars a lion and leopard as the two main police officers the player assumes the role of when playing the game. The object of the game is to arrest the four main criminals and then score the progressive jackpot.

The game features scoring by hitting each of the targets of the animals. As the targets of each animal are struck, a light of each lights up showing them in jail. The game also features scoring on a center ramp with unlimited shots of one million each after a series of shots, and a multi-ball. On the third ball of the game, players can shoot the right ramp twice, and add the highest current score to their own.

=== Firing Range (Skill Shot) ===
When starting the game, use the plunger to shoot the ball and score a randomly selected value between 10,000 and 100,000 points, determined by hitting a special target spinner. If the ball doesn't reach the spinner, it will drop back into the handcuff bonus trap, and the player scores 10,000 multiplied by the number of the ball in play (i.e. 10,000 x Ball 2, which is 20,000).

=== GUN Rollovers ===
At the top of the playfield are three rollovers that spell out G-U-N. Spelling the word GUN advances the bonus multiplier (which caps off at 6X), and allows the jackpot to increase for 10 seconds; when the ball hits any bumpers or target, the jackpot increases.

Bonus is multiplied by lighting all three G-U-N lanes (lit lanes change with flippers). When the multiplier increases, the jackpot is increased by all targets for a period of time. The end of ball bonus is then multiplied by whatever the multiplier is up to. On most games, the multiplier is carried over to subsequent balls if it is 2X or 3X. If the multiplier is above 3X, then it is reset to 1X on the next ball. Special is lit when the multiplier is maxed out (6X), and the player spells GUN again.

=== Criminal Targets ===
There are four specific criminals to arrest: the loan shark, the machine gun crocodile, the diamond weasel, and the drug rat. The shark, rat, and weasel can all be arrested by hitting all three proper targets with each animal. The shark's targets are on the left, while the weasel's are on the right, and the rat's targets are close to the center of the table next to the right ramp. To arrest the crocodile, shoot the ball into the Hot Sheet ball trap. Lights within the characters' bodies flash until they are arrested.

Once all four criminals are in jail, the player is eligible to score the jackpot, and the process resets.

=== Handcuff Bonus ===
Shoot the Handcuff target on the right side of the playfield (indicated by a flashing green arrow placed just under the weasel's targets) to score a handcuff bonus. The bonus can either be an incremental score, or 10,000 points times the number of the ball in play if the ball hits the trap from the plunger.

=== Hot Sheet Value ===
Scores one of five values when lit at the Croc kickout: Hot Score (mystery), Hot Extra Ball, 5 Free Games, Spot P-O-L-I-C-E, and Hot Multi-Ball. Hot Multi-Ball is only awarded if one ball is already locked. Shooting this trap also puts the crocodile in jail if he hasn't been arrested already.

=== Jackpot ===
Contrary to other pinball machines, Jackpot can be collected without the need of Multi-Ball. To light the Jackpot on the right ramp, all four criminals must be put in jail (Croc, Shark, Rat, and Weasel). Criminals in jail are indicated in the upper left part of the playfield above the Croc Kickout. When all four are incarcerated, Jackpot is lit and is collected by one shot up the right ramp. Value ranges from a minimum of 1,000,000 to a maximum of 4,000,000 and is increased for a period of time (10 seconds) after G-U-N is spelled.

The player has only 15 seconds after arresting the last criminal to win the jackpot. When it is won, it resets to 1 million points.

=== Multi-Ball ===
Contrary to other pinball machines, Multi-Ball has no special features attached to it, because it is not necessary to have Multi-Ball active in order to win the Jackpot. To activate multi-ball, shoot the ball up the right ramp when lock is lit. At the start of the game, the lock is lit to begin with; on subsequent multi-ball attempts, the player needs to first arrest a criminal before activating the lock. When the lock is not lit, shooting the ball up the right ramp instead spots a letter in the word "POLICE." Shooting the ball up the ramp a second time (or hitting the Croc kickout after one ball is locked) starts Multi-Ball.

=== P-O-L-I-C-E Letters ===
Letters are spotted by shooting the right ramp when lock is not lit, with a 75K Skill Shot, or from the Hot Sheet. Spotting all 6 letters lights the TOP COP BONUS (collected at the top of the playfield in a half-orbit shot that leads to the GUN rollovers) for 3,000,000 points. TOP COP stays lit until collected or the end of the current ball, whichever comes first.

Letters can also be lit during multi-ball when shooting one of the two balls up the right ramp.

=== Unlimited Millions ===
The middle ramp offers large bonuses if consecutive shots are made. The first shot is worth 50,000 points; to score successive shots, the player must make the ramp shot again within a short time and without hitting any targets, bumpers, or rollovers. The successive shots if done successfully score 75,000 points, 100,000, 150,000, and then 1 million points each time in succession (the unlimited millions). After an unlimited million is scored, the TOP COP bonus is lit once the ramp shot is missed or the time expires. Players can also win an extra ball at the TOP COP target when the unlimited millions is lit.

Mark Ritchie noted that for good players this is the only shot on the table they would aim for.

=== Take Highest Score ===
On the last ball only, shooting the ball up the right ramp twice adds the highest score achieved up to that point in the game (and only that game) to the player's own score; the player is only allowed one opportunity at this once the first shot has been made, however; hitting any other targets or going up the wrong section counts as a miss. If an extra ball is earned, the player gets another chance at taking the highest score if it wasn't achieved.

Mark Ritchie later said this feature is the largest flaw in the game, making competition play on the game moot.

If only one player is playing and successfully shoots the ball up the right ramp twice, or if the player in the lead successfully shoots the ball up the right ramp twice, this essentially doubles the player's score.

Operators can choose to set a desired game time, and if a player starts their last ball before scoring 2/3rd of this score a setting can be adjusted to give the player a consolation extra ball if they drain down the left outlane within the time set.

== Reception ==
Bill Kurtz writing for GameRoom magazine found that while the centre ramp shot overshadowed the rest of the game that there are sufficient other features to keep the game exciting.

== Digital versions ==
This pinball machine was included in the 1992 Atari Lynx game Pinball Jam alongside Elvira and the Party Monsters.
