= Pin-Bot =

1986 pinball machine

PIN•BOT
- Manufacturer: Williams
- Release date: October 1986
- System: Williams System 11A
- Model #: 549
- Design: Python Anghelo; Barry Oursler
- Programming: Bill Pfutzenreuter
- Artwork: Python Anghelo
- Mechanics: Joe Joos, Jr.
- Music: Chris Granner
- Sound: Chris Granner; Bill Parod
- Voices: Barry Oursler (PIN•BOT)
- Production run: 12,001

Pin-Bot (styled PIN•BOT and sometimes written as Pin*Bot) is a pinball machine released by Williams in October 1986. It was designed by Python Anghelo and Barry Oursler.

== Design ==
The concept of Pin-Bot began with a poem written by designer Python Anghelo:

I am your pinball game, I'm PinBot.
Your wit is my computer software.
Your fingers my mechanical design.

But your imagination I have not -
To you the spheres of my cosmic playfield;
Planets, Pinballs are the same.

I am a giant, cosmic robot.
A masterpiece of magic and high tech;
But human I am not!

So, on your sapien skills and temper rests
The conquest of the solar system.
As well as my existence.

Python Anghelo created the storyboard for the game in 1983. In a video recorded less than 2 years before his death, Anghelo said with Pin-Bot he "set out to do the greatest pinball game"; it is generally the game he is best remembered for. Chris Granner considered it Anghelo's most important work, a "metaphor for the relationship between computers and man".

When designing the skillshot mechanism he was inspired by the conical swirl in a seashell which followed the golden ratio.

Barry Oursler created the layout of the machine from Anghelo's drawings, completing it in seven months using only two whitewoods.

=== Audio ===
Originally Python Anghelo wanted Vangelis to create the soundtrack, but this would have exceeded budget constraints. Bill Parod started composing sound for the machine, with the first track completed used for entering a players high score. Chris Granner then early in his career created most of the remaining audio including the main theme. He was later called “The Mozart of pinball” by Python. Granner created what he called a "spacey melody" using chord progression composed on a DEC VAX 11/750 to compile song files. He first played this main theme for Eugene Jarvis, who after returning to listen to it several times in the following 24 hours declared "it's starting to grow on me". After other key people at Williams heard it, the final version was completed with only minor revisions.

Barry Oursler used his own voice with a voice coder to create the callouts. The sound system uses both the slightly older Williams system 11 sound algorithms, and the Yamaha YM2151. The bonus count uses the music and sound effects systems to make an out of sync arrpegio "gesture".

=== Pin-Bot mechanism ===
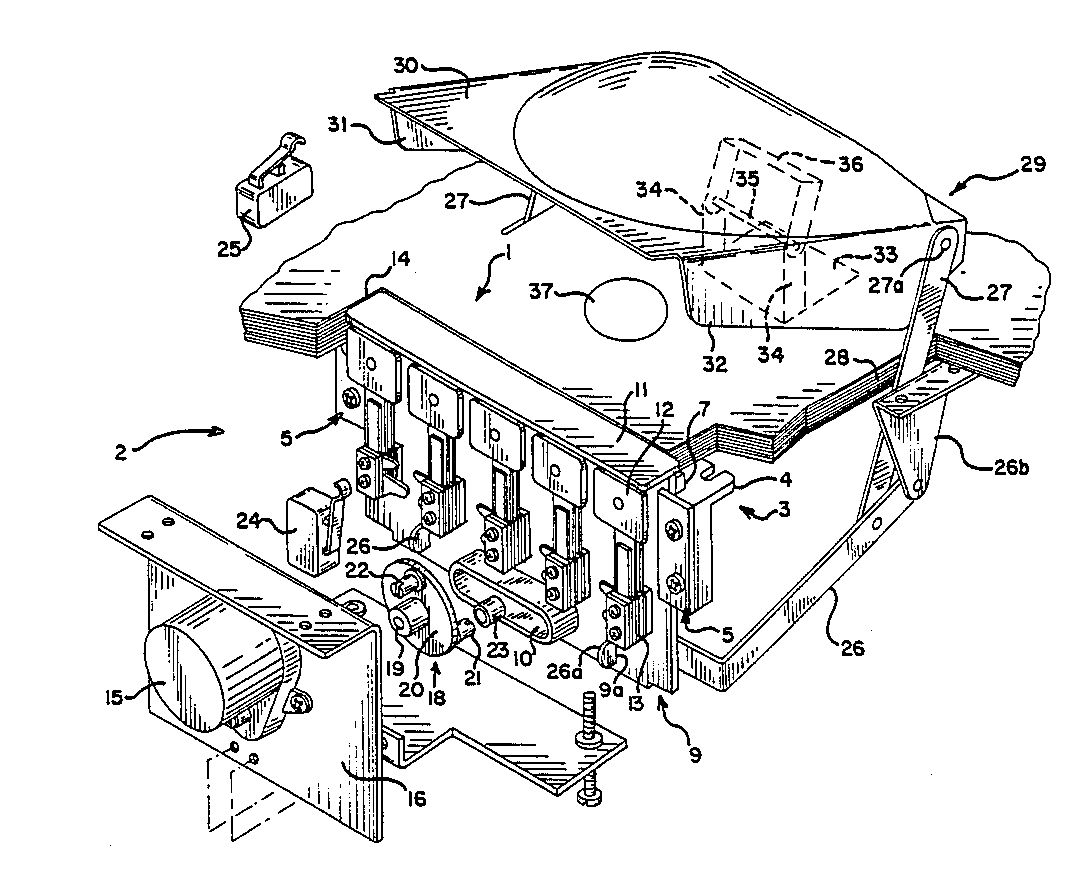
US patent 4773646A

The mechanism for the main part of Pin-Bot includes a bank of five targets that lower into the playfield, and uses a series of hinges to lift the visor behind them at the same time which reveals the ball-locks as eye sockets. This mechanism was created by Joe Joos, and he is the first name on the patent for it. In adverts for the machine the game was marketed with the slogan "Look into our eyes". The horizontal target bank represents the teeth of Pin-Bot. A recording of a freight elevator is used for the sound of the visor opening.

In addition to the face of Pin-Bot not being visible on the playfield when the visor is down, it is not visible on the backglass unless the light behind it is on. The game includes a light bar on top of the backbox which flashes during play.

== Layout and artwork ==
The plunger lane feeds into the skillshot mechanism which is a spiral increasing in height and contains three holes, and includes a small space shuttle on a flat plastic above it. The central feature are the banks of five horizontal and five vertical targets at the top and right edges of a grid of 25 lights arranged vertically into 5 columns of 5 colours. Below this are a series of lights in the playfield for the Sun, Mercury, Venus, Earth, Mars, Jupiter, Saturn, Uranus, Neptune, and Pluto. Below these and between the slingshots is a spaceprobe on the playfield with inserts that light up to indicate the bonus multiplier; this is based on the Voyager spacecraft.

Most of the left side of the playfield is coloured blue, and most of the right side is coloured red. This extends to the backbox with the hands and arms of Pin-Bot in these colours. The dot on the backglass between Pin and Bot is the image of a pinball with a mock reflection of a player in it. Half-way up on the left side is a bank of three drop-targets each with a light on the playfield. Just to the left of the visor is a lane which ends with a saucer, and to the left of this is the ramp.

This ramp leads to the upper playfield on the right side of the machine. This is in the shape of a mechanical woman with a bagatelle-type series of fixed pins on it; the ball can be directed from these to the plunger lane, the right inlane, be returned to the playfield, or fall through a hole in the chest of the woman to the middle of the group of three pop bumpers. Below this area is a single stand-up target. Between the flippers is a pin.

The plastics on the slingshots incorporate an image of a flipper in their design; in the original artwork before the machine was designed these represented the hands of Pin-Bot.

The flippers are shown on the playfield artwork in multiple similar positions very slightly below where the physical flippers are. Groups of four astronauts are shown connected to the hands of Pin-Bot on the backglass, and to either flipper on the playfield; one of these is named "United States space robot". Anghelo was quoted as saying "To me, a pinball machine is a robot. You are basically controlling like an exoskeleton robot in Aliens. Your fingers control the robot. And through you, through your fingers, the robot is an extension of you.” The outside of the cabinet shows Pin-Bot with flashing bolts of light extending from the flipper buttons.

== Gameplay ==
The game is controlled with two flippers, and has a manual plunger. The main objective of Pin-Bot is to advance through the planets of the Solar System, starting at Pluto and reaching the Sun. The player advances from planet to planet by hitting specially marked targets, earning special bonuses throughout the game.

The game begins with a skillshot up the spiral vortex ramp with the player attempting to get the ball in the middle hole. Pin-Bot's main feature is a grid of lights in the center of the playfield, just below Pin-Bot. The player can fill this grid by hitting the targets above and to the right of it, and can complete them with one shot at the beginning of the game by hitting the target for the lit column or row; if unsuccessful then multiple targets are hit to complete all 25 lights. Once completed, the visor opens, enabling the player to lock two balls in the robot's eye sockets, starting a two-ball multiball mode. The player can then re-lock one of the balls and use the other to score a Solar Value (jackpot) up the left ramp, at which point both balls go back into play. Each shot up the left ramp increases the Solar Value until it is collected, and this jackpot is carried over between games.

== Reception ==
The game performed well at early test locations, and was introduced at the AMOA '86 show. It debuted at the top of RePlay's Player choice charts in December 1986.

Play Meter found Pin-Bot to be "one of those rare games that offers excitement and never ending challenges". In a full review in a later issue of the same publication Roger Sharpe awarded the game 4/4. The purity of the ball movement was praised, as were the subtleties of the programming design and balance. The game was found to have its share of glitz, but without compromising the overall integrity of its design. For operators it was described as a "necessary investment".

After the main production run of 12,001 units of the game finished in February 1987, 750 more were produced in kit form for Unidesa, a Spanish manufacturer. These had a few differences to the full machine. A royalty fee of US$112,500 was paid to Williams in addition to the cost of the parts.

== Sequels ==
Pin-Bot was followed by two sequels: The Machine: Bride of Pin-Bot (released in 1991) and Jack-Bot (released in 1995).

== In popular culture ==
- The Pin-Bot character appears in the 1988 Taxi pinball machine (created by Python Anghelo and Mark Ritchie).
- Several Pin-Bot machines (labeled as Rik*Dat) appear as throwable weapons in the third stage of the arcade version of The Combatribes.
- A Pin-Bot machine is the central feature used for Terra Lightfoot's "Pinball King" music video released on her New Mistakes album in 2017.
- Pin Bot was featured iin the New York loft that Josh Baskin (Tom Hanks) in the 1988 movie "Big".

== Digital versions ==
The first video game version was released as Pin Bot by Rare for the Nintendo Entertainment System in 1990.

Tiger produced a standalone handheld version using an LCD screen.

Pin-Bot is one of 12 tables released on the arcade game UltraPin.

Pin-Bot released for various platforms in Pinball Hall of Fame: The Williams Collection between 2008 and 2011. The same developer released Pin-Bot for The Pinball Arcade for several platforms in 2013. The Machine: Bride of Pin-Bot and Jack-Bot were also released for this game and all were available until June 30, 2018, when all Williams tables were removed due to licensing issues.

A version with optional additional animations released for Pinball FX on August 14, 2025. These animations include Pin-Bot and the space nymph (from the upper playfield).
