= Pinball Jam =

1992 video game

- Developer: Atari Corporation
- Publisher: Atari Corporation
- Programmer: Joel Seider
- Composer: David Tumminaro
- Platform: Atari Lynx
- Release: 1992
- Genre: Pinball

Pinball Jam is a 1992 video game for the Atari Lynx, developed and released by Atari Corporation. It features two pinball tables licensed from Williams, with playfield graphics and rules based on Elvira and the Party Monsters and Police Force, but with different music and sound effects.

== Gameplay ==
The game uses an overhead view, which scrolls to track the ball. When multiple balls are in play, the game tracks the lower ball, with arrows pointing to other balls. The end of game match sequences from the physical machines are not used. The game has an easy mode where the player has five balls per game, and a hard mode where the player has the traditional three balls per game, and certain targets reset after a ball drains. Players can nudge the tables. The game manual summarizes the main rules of the original games. Pinball Jam has a high score leaderboard which shows the top three scores on each table. Some digitized voices from the original versions are included, but are somewhat scratchy, and rearranged.

== Reception ==
Reception

Review scores
Publication	Score
AllGame	2.5/5
Aktueller Software Markt	10/12
Consoles +	59%
Electronic Gaming Monthly	6/10, 6/10, 6/10, 8/10
IGN	8/10
Joypad	82%
Joystick	82%
Mega Fun	71/100
Video Games (DE)	70%
VideoGames & Computer Entertainment	7/10
Zero	65/100
Consolemania	85/100
Game Zone	38/100
Go! Hand-Held Video Games	78/100
Megablast	72%
Play Time	25%

Pinball Jam received mixed reviews from critics.

IGN found the game closely resembles the original pinball tables, with game physics sufficiently convincing; but when the ball moves quickly the scrolling becomes "jumpy" to keep pace. It concluded that while it is a fun game, it wouldn't satisfy die-hards.

VideoGames & Computer Entertainment found the physics were not always accurate.

Go! Hand-Held Video Games magazine criticized the game for having "dodgy ball inertia" with the ball movement not sufficiently realistic.

Electronic Gaming Monthly praised the game for including two tables, but found they lacked visual appeal. The music was called "typical annoying Lynx bleeps."

GamePro recommended it to pinball fanatics, but noted that the flippers could be hard to see at times against the colorful playfields.
