= Chris Granner =

Music composer

- Born: 1957 (age 68–69); Mt. Kisco, New York, U.S.
- Other name: Granzo
- Occupations: Video game and pinball composer
- Website: CGMusic

Christopher P. Granner (born 1957 in Mt. Kisco, New York) is a freelance music composer, best known for composing music for video games and pinball games.

== Career and biography ==
Granner's father was an organist/pianist, so he was interested in music since his childhood. He studied composition and computer sound/music at University of Illinois at Urbana–Champaign under prolific musicians Ben Johnston, Herbert Brün, Salvatore Martirano and Scott Wyatt. After finishing university with a Bachelor of Music and a Master of Fine Arts in music composition he moved to Evanston-located Northwestern University's music lab. There Granner heard that Williams Electronics (which evolved into Midway Games) was looking for a composer, and he took the job and became a leading composer in the coin-op and pinball industry. After leaving Midway, Granner set up his own sound production studio, CGMusic, and produced music and sound for many video games, advertisements and pinball games.

From 2006 to 2011, Granner had retired from composing music for games, after he was finished with Stern / Steve Ritchie Productions' pinball, World Poker Tour. In 2011, Granner came out of retirement and joined the newly formed Jersey Jack Pinball, where he served as the composer and audio director for their first pinball game, The Wizard of Oz. In April 2012, Granner began audio work with Spooky Cool Labs, a Chicago-based startup company developing social games for Facebook and mobile platforms. He joined Spooky Cool, in-house, as Audio Director in October 2012. In June 2013, Spooky Cool was acquired by Zynga; Granner is currently serving as Audio Director of that studio, now known as Zynga Chicago, which produces games for the Hit It Rich! social casino.

== Works ==
The titles shown are in chronological order.

=== Pinball ===
==== Williams ====
- Road Kings (with Bill Parod)
- Millionaire
- Pin*Bot (with Bill Parod)
- F-14 Tomcat (with Steve Ritchie and Bill Parod)
- Fire! (with Rich Karstens)
- Big Guns
- Cyclone
- Taxi
- Truck Stop
- Jokerz! (with Jon Hey)
- Earthshaker! (with Jon Hey)
- Police Force
- Elvira and the Party Monsters
- Whirlwind
- Diner
- Dr. Dude
- FunHouse (with Jon Hey)
- Terminator 2: Judgment Day
- The Addams Family
- Fish Tales
- White Water
- Indiana Jones: The Pinball Adventure (with Rich Karstens)
- Red & Ted's Road Show

==== Midway (Bally) ====
- Truck Stop
- Elvira and the Party Monsters
- Dr. Dude And His Excellent Ray (with Jon Hey)
- The Addams Family
- The Twilight Zone (with Rich Karstens)
- Indianapolis 500

==== Capcom ====
- Pinball Magic (with Jeff Powell)
- Airborne
- The Pit and the Pendulum
- Kingpin

==== Stern ====
- Monopoly
- RollerCoaster Tycoon^{(PLD)}
- The Simpsons Pinball Party (with Dan Forden)^{(Keith P. Johnson, Joe Balcer)}
- Terminator 3: Rise of the Machines ^{(SRP)}
- The Lord of the Rings^{(George Gomez)}
- Ripley's Believe It or Not!^{(PLD)}
- Elvis^{(SRP)}
- The Sopranos^{(George Gomez)}
- NASCAR (released as Grand Prix in Europe)^{(PLD)}
- The Simpsons Kooky Carnival (redemption game, with Dan Forden)
- World Poker Tour^{(SRP)}
- Dale Jr.

==== Jersey Jack Pinball ====
- The Wizard of Oz (with Rob Berry)

The names in superscript are the designers from the pinball machine, PLD stands for Pat Lawlor Design, SRP stands for Steve Ritchie Productions

=== Video games ===
==== Williams ====
- Joust 2: Survival of the Fittest

==== Midway ====
- Trog
- Strike Force
- Terminator 2: Judgment Day
- Revolution X
- WWF WrestleMania

==== Electronic Arts ====
- Super Baseball 2020 (with Brian L. Schmidt; Sega Genesis version)

==== Atari Games ====
- California Speed

==== Incredible Technologies ====
- Golden Tee Fore!

==== Microsoft ====
- Tao Feng: Fist of the Lotus (developed by Studio Gigante)

==== THQ ====
- WWE WrestleMania 21 (developed by Studio Gigante)

==== Zynga ====
- Wizard of Oz social adventure-sim game (developed by Spooky Cool Labs; now inactive)
- Hit It Rich! social casino
