= Big Guns (pinball) =

1987 pinball machine

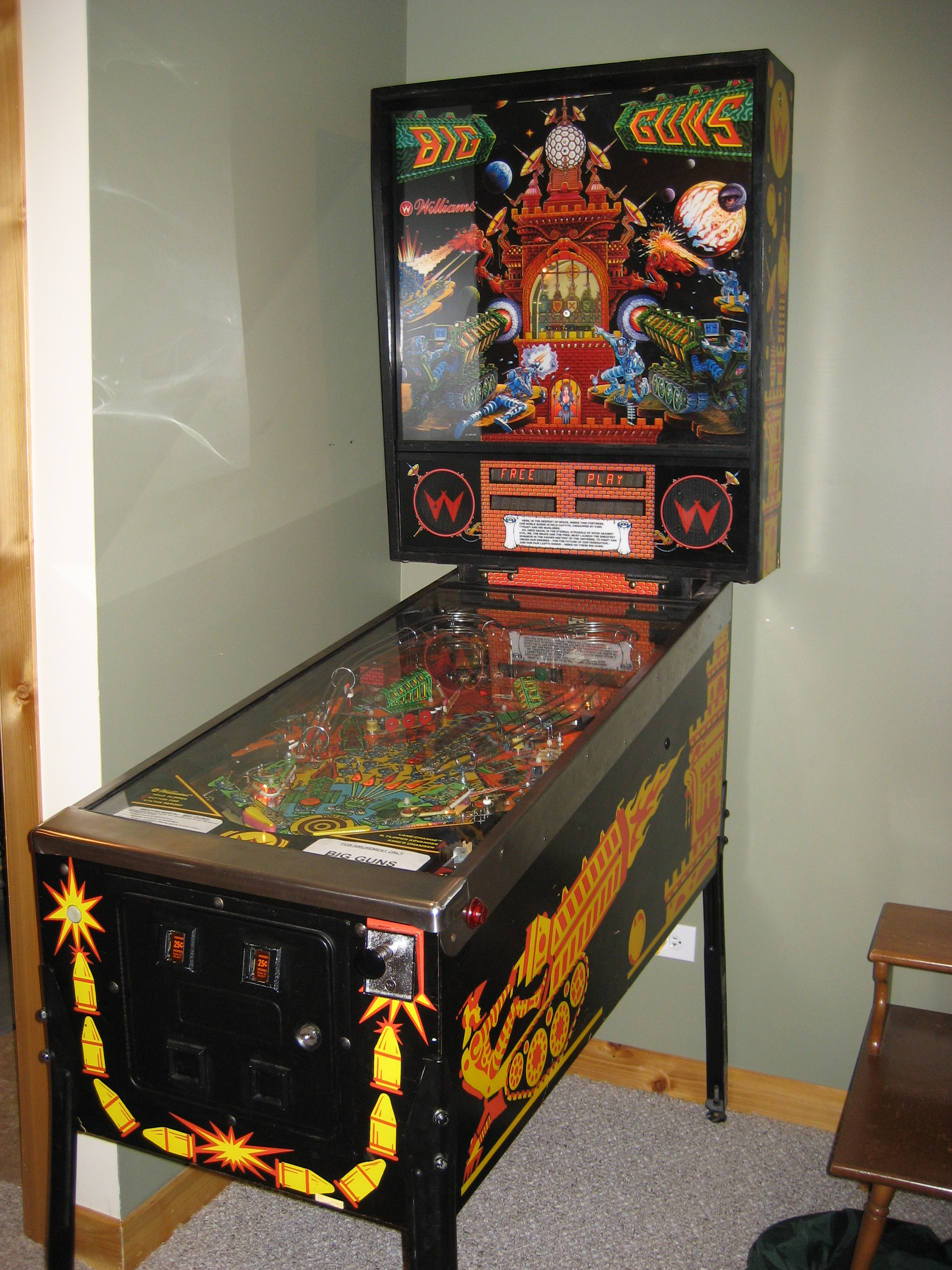
- Manufacturer: Williams
- Release date: October 1987
- System: Williams System 11B or 11A
- Design: Mark Ritchie, Python Anghelo
- Programming: Bill Pfutzenreuter
- Artwork: Python Anghelo
- Music: Chris Granner
- Sound: Chris Granner, Brian Schmidt
- Production run: 5,250

Big Guns is a 1987 pinball machine designed by Mark Ritchie and Python Anghelo and released by Williams.

== Design ==
This is the first pinball machine to use catapults, which were invented by Mark Ritchie. The game was designed around these catapults. To reduce potential technical issues, the catapults have plastic covers which make them look like cannons. A patent for this mechanism was applied for, but denied due to similar existing mechanisms.

The backglass was drawn by Python Anghelo at a height four inches taller than on other Williams machines of the time. The backbox includes a bagatelle/pachinko style playfield. The idea for this came from a 1967 Williams pinball machine called Apollo. A version of Big Guns was created by Unidesa with a standard size backbox. The soldiers are shown on the playfield from an overhead perspective.

A description below the score display reads:

"Here, in the deepest of space, inside this fortress, our noble Queen is held captive, kidnapped by King Tyrant and his warlords.

"So, once again, in the eternal struggle of good against evil, we, the brave and the free, must launch the greatest invasion in the known history of the universe, to fight and crush our enemies, for the future of our federation - and our fair lady's honor - rides on these big guns."

The King Tyrant was inspired by the designer's brother, Steve Ritchie, who also recorded the voice for the character.

A June 1988 revision in the software increased takings at some locations by 20%.

== Layout ==
The game is mostly symmetrical, a design-choice because of the two catapults.

The playfield is divided into two parts, each of which has two flippers. The part further from the player includes the two catapults and the entrance to the wireforms they launch the ball into. This area also includes two banks of three drop-targets, called "troll" targets; behind these are two loops. The lower part of the playfield includes ten palace guard targets which are used to light the kickback in the left outlane. There is a center post between the flippers.

== Gameplay ==
The story involves the player attempting to beat intergalactic knights and soldiers under the command of their King who has kidnapped the Queen and held her captive in a castle dungeon. The game begins with a skillshot, which loads the right cannon if the player is successful. The primary objective of the game is to load three cannons to start multiball to attack the castle and rescue the Queen.

The King's chamber shown on the backglass fires a mini-ball which drops into one of five slots. After losing their last ball the player has a chance to earn an extra ball by getting this ball into the correct slot.

== Reception ==
Play Meter found the game to be the best pinball machine at the 1987 AMOA show. The November issue featured the game as its cover story. Roger Sharpe reviewed the game in the February 1988 issue, praising the artwork, and the catapults eliminating the need for ramps. He awarded it 2.75/4, calling it an exciting but repetitive game.

Electronic Game Player said while the playfield could appear sparse in some areas, that the game carries an original theme with flair.
