= Star Rider =

1983 LaserDisc-based arcade game

- Sales flyer showing the arcade cabinet
- Developer: Williams Electronics
- Publisher: Williams Electronics
- Designers: RJ Mical; John Newcomer; Python Anghelo
- Programmers: Richard Witt; Ken Graham
- Artist: Python Anghelo
- Platform: Arcade
- Release: NA: November 1983
- Genre: Racing
- Mode: Single-player
- Arcade system: Williams 6809 Rev.1 Videodisk

Star Rider is a racing LaserDisc video game developed by Computer Creations and Williams Electronics, and released for arcades in 1983. The object of the game is to win a futuristic motorcycle race that takes place in surrealistic settings. The tracks themselves and the background graphics are video played from a Laserdisc, and are of higher quality than possible with real-time computer graphics at the time. The foreground graphics and racers are superimposed on the video. Star Rider has a rear view mirror – possibly the first racing game with one – which warns of opponents approaching from behind.

Star Rider was produced in both an upright and a sit-down version where the player would sit on a replica of the cycle. It was released after the video game crash of 1983 and was not widely distributed. According to Eugene Jarvis of Williams, Star Rider was a "major dog" and resulted in or contributed to a loss of US$50 million. The title character from Sinistar and a flying mount from Joust make cameo appearances in the background graphics.

== Development and release ==
The game was conceived to compete with the LaserDisc game Dragon's Lair which had just come to market. RJ Mical coordinated the project, Python Anghelo was a co-designer, Ken Lantz directed software development, Richard Witt was the lead programmer, Ken Graham was a secondary programmer, and John Newcomer was the "creative director". The hardware was custom build specially for the game; the laser disc video production was outsourced to a third-party company, Computer Creations, of South Bend, Indiana. The CGI graphics were rendered at Grey and Associates. Witt and Lantz developed a means by which the first few lines of NTSC video signal contained data about the roadway, so that animated riders could appear to follow the track.

Star Rider was first demonstrated at the Amusement & Music Operators Association (AMOA) show in October 1983. It demonstrated the use of pre-rendered 3D computer graphics, which had previously been demonstrated by Funai's Interstellar at the Amusement Machine Show (AM Show) that took place last month. Star Rider was released in North America in November the same year.

== Reception ==
In the United States, it was the top-grossing LaserDisc game at arcade locations on the Play Meter charts in August 1984. It was later the top LaserDisc game at street locations in November 1984.

== Legacy ==
In the 1987 slasher horror movie Blood Rage, two characters, Artie (James Farrell) and Gregg (Chad Montgomery), are seen playing Star Rider on a television set. Later, Artie and Julie (Jayne Bentzen) are seen playing the game but using joysticks to control the screen.

== See also ==
- List of LaserDisc games
