= Mark Ritchie (pinball designer) =

American pinball designer (born 1958)

- Born: August 20, 1958 (age 67); San Francisco, California
- Occupation: Pinball designer
- Known for: Taxi, Diner, Fish Tales, Indiana Jones: The Pinball Adventure
- Spouse: Trudy Jacobs Ritchie (married 1983-present)
- Relatives: Steve Ritchie (brother)

Mark Ritchie (born August 20, 1958) is an American pinball designer and video game producer. He is best known for his successful pinball designs from 1982-1996. He has continued to work in the coin-operated amusement industry, currently serving as production coordinator for Raw Thrills, Inc. / Play Mechanix, Inc. Mark is the younger brother of fellow pinball designer Steve Ritchie.

== Early life ==
Ritchie first began playing pinball at local bowling alleys and arcades as a child. The first machine he played seriously was Captain Fantastic, which his brother had borrowed from Atari, where he worked.

== Career ==
=== Atari, Inc. (1976 - 1979) ===
Ritchie's first job in the pinball industry was with Atari, Inc. in 1976. His first position was as an assembler at Atari's Santa Clara, California video game production facility. A few months later, Ritchie was part of a group selected to help start Atari's pinball production facility in Sunnyvale. He served there as a production line lead and in 1978 was promoted to prototype specialist within Atari's pinball engineering group. There, he was responsible for building, cabling and testing prototype pinball machines. It was during this time that he learned the business of pinball design and development. While at that position, Ritchie worked on the pinball titles Hercules, Superman, Space Riders and Monza.

=== Williams Electronics, Inc. (1979 - 1993) ===
In 1979, Ritchie was hired by Williams Electronics, Inc. in Chicago, Illinois as a prototype specialist, and in 1981, designed his first game for williams, Thunderball. However, Thunderball was never put into production. His second machine Firepower II was a sequel to the Firepower machine, designed by Steve Ritchie, and sold 3,400 machines. Ritchie went on to design a total of 12 games for Williams, including Taxi, Diner, Fish Tales and Indiana Jones: The Pinball Adventure. While at Williams Electronics, Ritchie also designed two "pitch-and-bat" novelty amusement games, Pennant Fever and Slugfest. In an unofficial role, Ritchie also provided voices for several talking games.

=== Capcom Coin-Op, Inc. (1993 - 1996) ===
Ritchie left Williams Electronics in August, 1993 for a new opportunity at Capcom Coin-Op, Inc. He was hired as director of engineering for Capcom's new pinball division. Capcom made 5 pinball titles under Ritchie's leadership, including Pinball Magic, Big Bang Bar and Kingpin, which was Ritchie's last conventional pinball design to date.

=== Ritchie Design, Ltd. (1996 - 1997) ===
After Capcom closed its pinball division in 1996, Ritchie started a game design firm aptly named Ritchie Design, Ltd. His first product was a redemption game entitled Road Kill Grill, the rights to which were eventually sold to Incredible Technologies, Inc.

=== Incredible Technologies, Inc. (1997 - 2005) ===
In 1997, Ritchie accepted a full-time position at Incredible Technologies, Inc. as a designer and producer. While there, he was responsible for the packaging vision for a new digital jukebox project, which was at the forefront of the technology. Both designed and tested extensively, the product was not produced in significant numbers. Following, Ritchie was asked to provide packaging and design inspiration for I.T.'s new foray into touchscreen countertop game design. In 2001, Incredible Technologies agreed to produce Big Buck Hunter which was developed by Play Mechanix, Inc., and Ritchie assumed the role of producer on the project. Ritchie also designed Orange County Choppers – a video pinball game themed after the popular reality television series.

=== Raw Thrills, Inc. / Play Mechanix, Inc. (2005 - Present) ===
In 2005, Ritchie left Incredible Technologies and began work at Raw Thrills, Inc., a video game production studio headed by acclaimed game designer Eugene Jarvis. After Play Mechanix merged with Raw Thrills in 2006, Ritchie relocated to the Play Mechanix studio, where he currently works as a producer and production coordinator and is involved in the development of coin-operated amusement video games. In March 2023, Play Mechanix and Chicago Gaming Company announced a collaborative effort to produce a brand new Pulp Fiction pinball machine with Mark Ritchie as designer, marking his return to pinball after nearly thirty years.

== Personal life ==
Mark Ritchie currently resides in Illinois.

== Mark Ritchie's games ==
=== Williams Electronics, Inc. ===
- Thunderball (1982, unreleased)
- Firepower 2 (1983)
- Pennant Fever (pitch-and-bat baseball novelty) (1984)
- Sorcerer (1985)
- Road Kings (1986)
- Big Guns (1987)
- Taxi (1988)
- Police Force (1989)
- Diner (1990)
- Slugfest (pitch-and-bat baseball novelty) (1991)
- Fish Tales (1992)
- Indiana Jones: The Pinball Adventure (1993)

=== Capcom Coin-Op ===
- Pinball Magic (1995)
- Airborne (1996)
- Breakshot (1996)
- Big Bang Bar (1996)
- Kingpin (1996)

=== Chicago Gaming Company ===
- Pulp Fiction (2023)
