= Python Anghelo =

Pinball and video game artist

- Born: Python Vladimir Anghel; January 1, 1954; Transylvania, Romania
- Died: April 9, 2014 (aged 60); Chicago, Illinois, United States
- Occupation: Graphic artist

Python Vladimir Anghelo (January 1, 1954 – April 9, 2014) was a graphic artist best known for his work on video games and pinball machines. Anghelo was born in Transylvania, Romania, and moved to the United States when he was 17.

== Career ==
After studying art and animation in Romania and the US, he worked as an animator for Disney until 1979. He then moved to Williams Electronics to create the artwork for Joust, taking a 50% pay cut in the process because he believed video games had more potential than traditional animation.

He continued to work for Williams (and, later, Midway Games after it merged with Williams) for 15 years until 1994, when his most ambitious project, The Pinball Circus, was discontinued.

In April of 1994, Anghelo released his first project with Capcom; Goofy Hoops. While sold under the Romstar name, a co-financier of Capcom Coin-Op, it used Capcom's hardware. He then designed Flipper Football, his first pinball machine with Capcom. He was in the process of designing the erotic pinball game Zingy Bingy, when Capcom closed its pinball division. After pinball, Anghelo worked for several companies including Bay Tek Games to design novelty games such as Chameleon Paradize.

Anghelo died from cancer on April 9, 2014. Several fundraisers were held on GoFundMe during his treatment to help pay for his medical expenses.

== Pinball ==
- Comet (1985, artwork)
- High Speed (1986, backglass artwork)
- Grand Lizard (1986, design and artwork)
- Pin*Bot (1986, concept, design, and artwork)
- Big Guns (1987, design and artwork)
- Cyclone (1988, artwork)
- Taxi (1988, design and artwork)
- Jokerz! (1988, design)
- Police Force (1989, artwork)
- Bad Cats (1989, artwork)
- Bugs Bunny's Birthday Ball (1991, concept and artwork)
- The Machine: Bride of Pin*Bot (1991, concept and design)
- Hurricane (1991, artwork)
- Fish Tales (1992, concept)
- Popeye Saves the Earth (1994, concept, design and artwork)
- The Pinball Circus (1994, design)
- Goofy Hoops (1994, artwork)
- Flipper Football (1996, design)
- Zingy Bingy (1997, design, unreleased)

== Video games ==
- Joust (1982, cabinet art, sprite art, animations)
- Bubbles (1983, co-designer, cabinet art)
- Sinistar (1983, sound engineer)
- Star Rider (1983, co-designer, concept, and artwork)
- Mystic Marathon (1984, enemy designer)
- Inferno (1984, concept, designer, artwork)
