= Terminator 2: Judgment Day (pinball) =

1991 pinball machine

- Manufacturer: Williams
- Release date: July 1991
- System: Williams WPC (Dot Matrix)
- Design: Steve Ritchie
- Programming: Dwight Sullivan
- Artwork: Doug Watson
- Mechanics: Carl Biagi
- Music: Chris Granner
- Sound: Chris Granner
- Voices: Arnold Schwarzenegger (The Terminator)
- Animation: John Vogel, Scott Slomiany
- Production run: 15,202

Terminator 2: Judgment Day is a 1991 pinball machine designed by Steve Ritchie and released by Williams Electronics. It is based on the motion picture of the same name.

== Overview and design ==
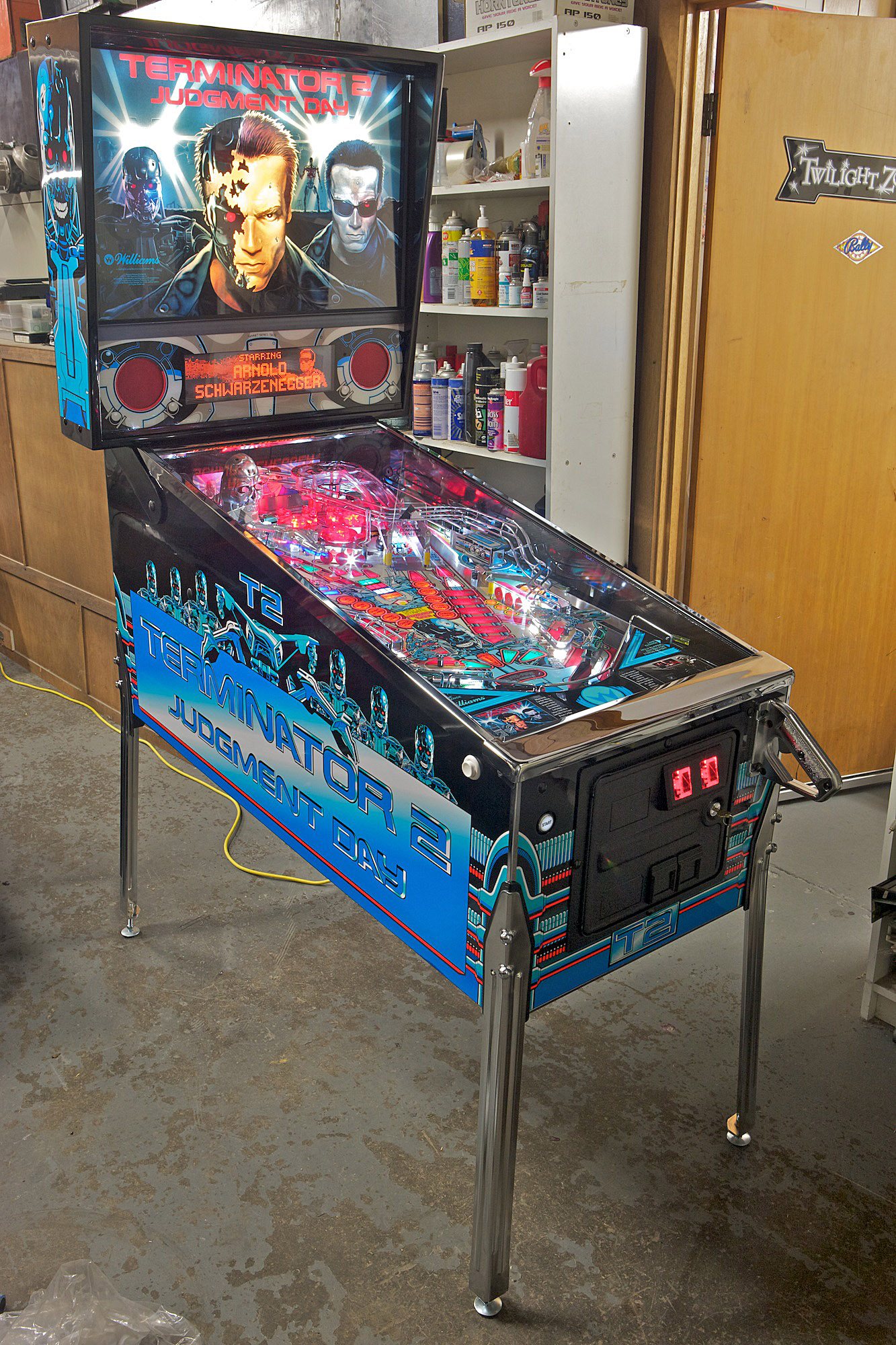
A restored Terminator 2 custom pinball machine

The Terminator was one of Steve Ritchie's favourite movies. Williams license agreement with Carolco Licensing gave them access to photos and videos early in the production of the movie from late 1990. During the design of this game Steve Ritchie met Jim Cameron and Stan Winston and gained access to pre-production art, and props including the skull and microchip which were used in the game.

The table is the first Williams WPC machine designed to feature a dot-matrix display(DMD). But due to the long design phase, Gilligan's Island is the first manufactured with a DMD. Terminator 2: Judgment Day is the first game to feature an autoplunger (replacing the traditional plunger) with a patent-protected trigger mechanism, as well as a patent-protected ball-firing cannon (dubbed, "Gun Grip Ball Launcher") and a metallic T-800 skull. Terminator 2 is also the first game to feature a video mode, a mini video game featured on the DMD. Arnold Schwarzenegger provided voices for the game. Some playfield design elements were based on Ritchie's 1980 classic, Firepower. The T-1000 is not in the artwork, with the exception of a small image of actor Robert Patrick because of pre-release secrecy of the movie. The character is only in the display animation because when the DMD programming was finalizing the liquid metal character was already public knowledge.

The first design of the backglass was made by Doug Watson before he had imagery from the film, when shown to Arnold Schwarzenegger for approval he asked for his signature sunglasses to be added. Watson left the central figure unchanged and converted a skeletoid T-800 to one with the full face and sunglasses of Schwarzenegger. This was liked by him so much that Arnold Schwarzenegger agreed to provide voices for the game in exchange for the original painting. Due to complications with that agreement involving Carolco Doug Watson retained ownership of the painting, and loaned it to the Pacific Pinball Museum.

It is the first game to introduce a ball saver due to some balls when launched immediately draining down the left outlane.

The game has mono audio. The tune used for the hurry-up is a "sideways version of a musical break" in the middle of an obscure Genesis tune. Other variations were used for hurry-ups of later games including Fish Tales.

Despite the extra features in the game and being sold at a relatively low price, Williams still had good profit margins on it.

At the "Terminator 2: Judgment Day Convention" on June 30, 1991 one of these games was given away to the winner of a tournament played on it.

== Layout ==
The table has left and right orbits, and left and right ramps with each of the ramps return the ball to the in-lane on that side of the table. On the left side of the machine is a saucer which can lock a ball. Below the entrance to the left ramp is a bank of five stand-up targets. To the right of this ramp is the T-800 skull with a drop-target in front of it; balls hit into the skull are launched with a popper along a wireform and into the cannon located half-way up the right side of the machine. Towards the back right of the table are three upper rollovers with three pop bumpers below them; below these is a bank of three stand-up targets. On the right side of the machine, below where the ball is launched onto the table is another bank of three stand-up targets.

The major features of this game are reproduced for the 4th and final table in the classic 1992 Commodore Amiga game Pinball Dreams, called Nightmare, or Graveyard on other platforms.

== Gameplay ==
The game has 2 flippers, each controlled with a button on the side of the cabinet. The game begins with the player attempting to hit the moving lit target on the bank of five targets for a skillshot.

=== Multiball ===
After the drop target is hit and lowered a ball can be sent to the cannon via the skull; this rotates, and if the player launches the ball at the right time to hit a lit target a two-ball multiball starts. After hitting three specific shots the player gets the chance to score a jackpot by hitting another lit target from the cannon. After collecting the jackpot, the player can again lower the drop target and shoot at another target with the cannon, but this time with other balls still in play on the main playfield. Many players move their head to the right and look from the cannon's perspective to time launching the ball.

By hitting the ramps a series of round inserts (checkpoint->passcode->silent alarm->vault key->CPU lit) light and a timed mode called payback time begins. The centre bank of targets advances a ladder of awards which the player can collect with left orbit shots. Right orbit shots advance the other ladder of awards, which consists entirely of points based awards. When the left saucer is lit, it can be hit to collect a random award, called a database award. Completing the upper rollovers advances the bonus multiplier.

=== Video mode ===
A short "video game" is played on the DMD consisting of Terminators which must be shot by the player controlling a cross hair with the flippers, and ends when a Terminator shoots the player.

== Reception ==
In a look at three new pinball machines, Play Meter called it more than a good game, a licensing coup working to coincide with the release date of the film. Sinclair User gave the pinball game a 93% score. Initial reviews from players were positive, with one calling it a "great marriage of movie and pinball game."

== Digital version ==
Terminator 2: Judgment Day was released in 2013 as a licensed table for The Pinball Arcade, and available until June 30, 2018 when it was removed due to the Williams license expiration. The production of this version was funded by a kickstarter.

== Legacy ==
The ball saver introduced in this game was used in most future games, but one of the lead software developers at Williams, Larry DeMar felt it was overused.

2003's Terminator 3: Rise of the Machines manufactured by Stern has a very similar playfield design and rulesheet.
