= Pinball Hall of Fame =

Coordinates: 36°05′05.4″N 115°10′14.8″W

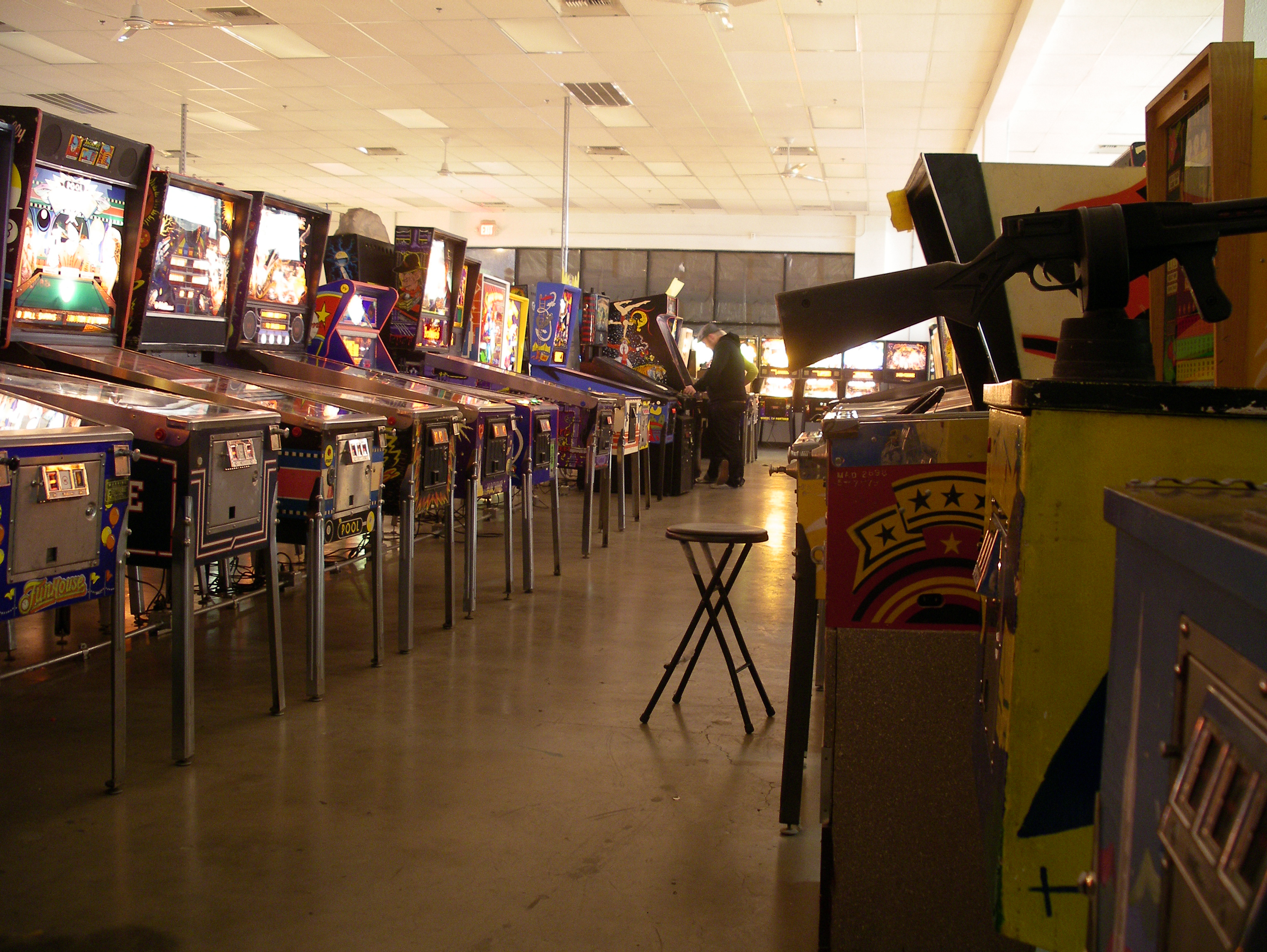
- Established: February 2006
- Location: 4925 S. Las Vegas Boulevard; Las Vegas, Nevada
- Type: Pinball Museum
- Collection size: ~700 pinball machines
- Director: Tim Arnold
- Website: PinballMuseum.org

The Pinball Hall of Fame is a nonprofit hands-on museum for playable pinball machines in Las Vegas, Nevada, first opened in 2006. The museum is a project of the Las Vegas Pinball Collectors Club featuring pinball machines, arcade games and other novelty machines from all eras. Fully staffed by volunteers, excess revenues are donated to the Salvation Army.

== History ==
Since 1990, Tim Arnold has been raising funding for the project, raising money selling videos about pinball repair and organizing pinball nights at his house with his large personal collection of pinball machines, which started with the purchase of his first machine in 1972. Arnold initially lived in Michigan, and moved his collection of pinball machines to Las Vegas in the early 1990s. By 2003, a fund of $167,000 had been raised.

The Pinball Hall of Fame first opened in 2006 at 3300 E Tropicana Ave, Las Vegas, Nevada, and featured approximately 200 pinball machines, classic video games and arcade games. In late 2009, the Pinball Hall of Fame moved to 1610 E Tropicana Ave. By 2018 the collection had grown to approximately 260 machines.

An annex location was opened at the Riviera Hotel and Casino in 2013 and ceased operations two years later upon the property's closure.

In 2016, Arnold denied reports he was looking for a successor or he would close the museum. Instead there are plans to expand The Pinball Hall of Fame by constructing a new building on a next door lot to the east of the present building.

In 2020, the Pinball Hall of Fame announced plans to move to a new, larger location at 4925 S Las Vegas Blvd. The new location, a purpose-built 28,000 square foot warehouse, is intended to house the Hall of Fame's complete collection of more than 700 games. During the COVID-19 pandemic the Pinball Hall of Fame's future was in jeopardy. To raise necessary funds to complete the new building, move the collection, and keep the museum operating, Arnold and the museum launched a GoFundMe campaign in January 2021.

The Pinball Hall of Fame opened in its Las Vegas Blvd location on April 15, 2021. On July 1, 2021, the Pinball Hall of Fame had its official grand opening at its new location.

== Gallery ==
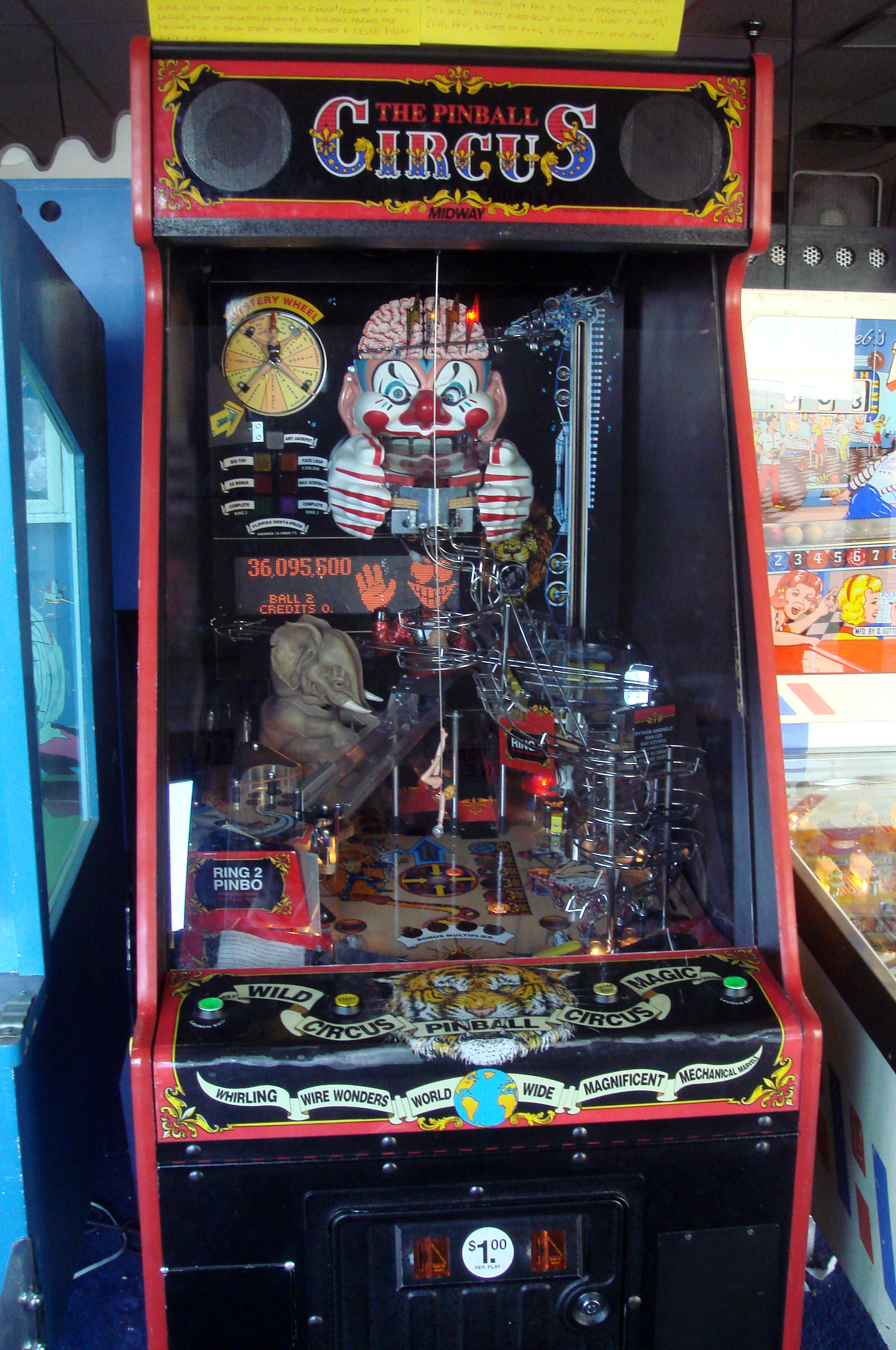
The Pinball Circus, one of two units of a unique vertical pinball game

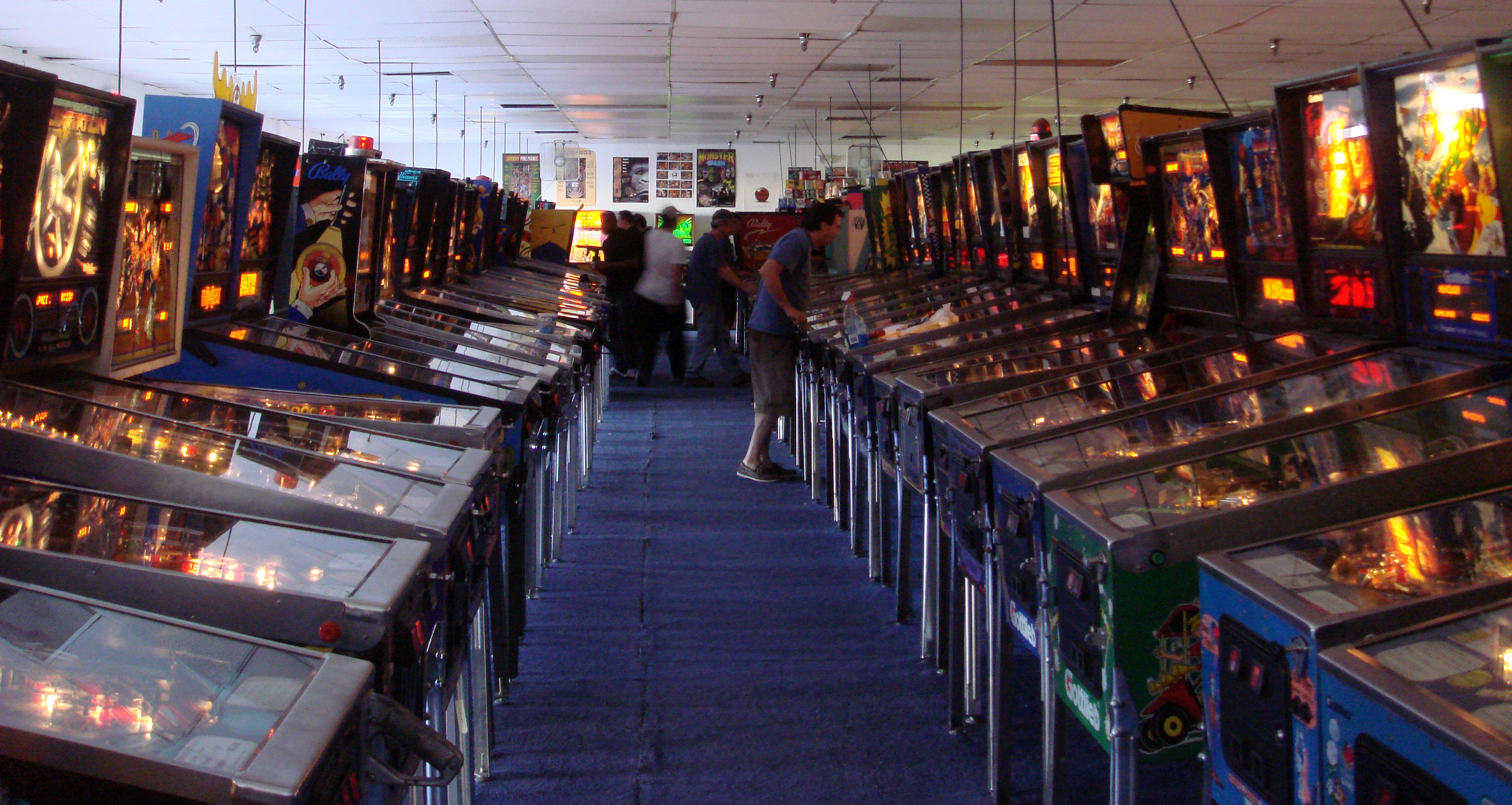

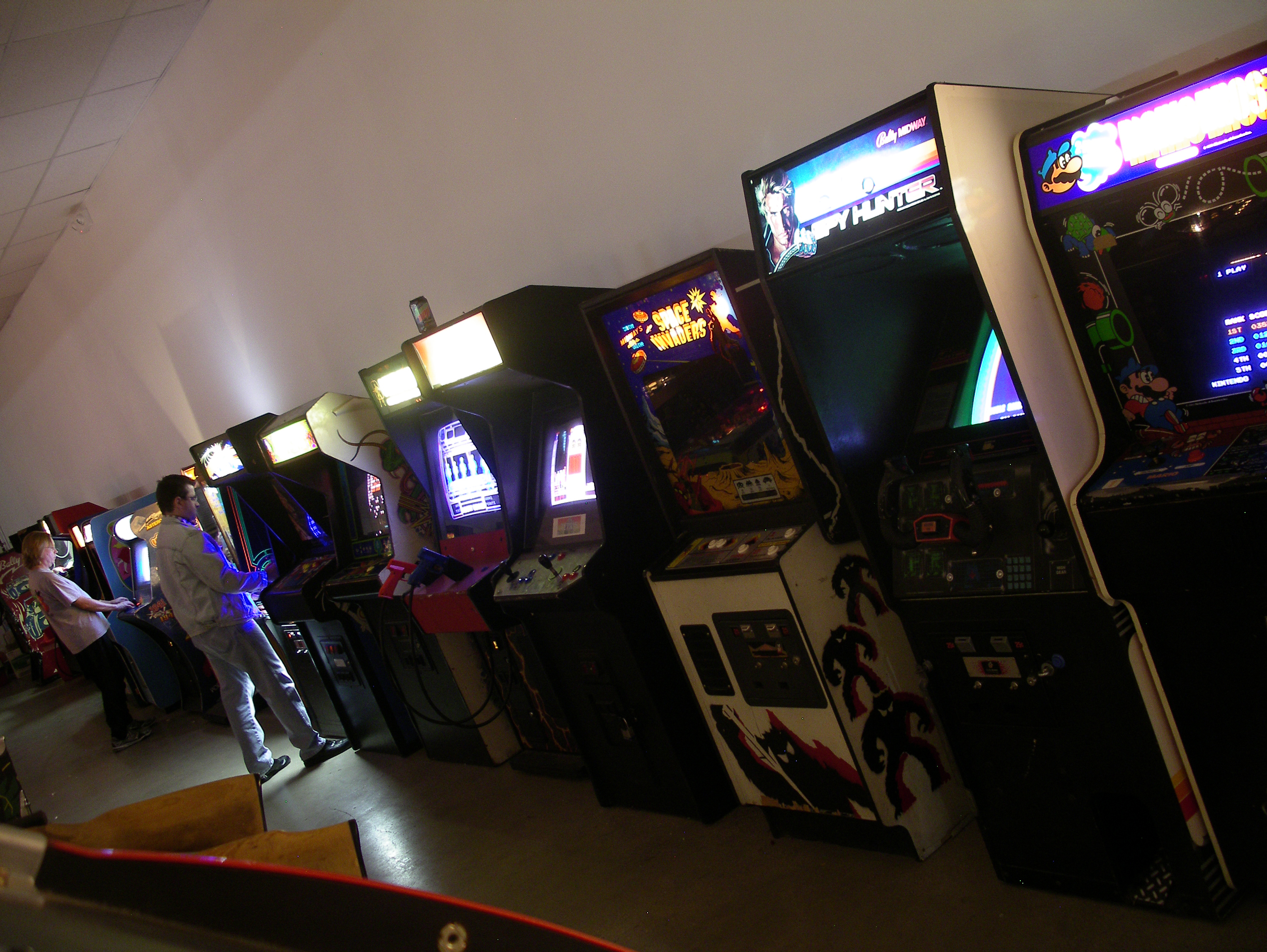
Video game row

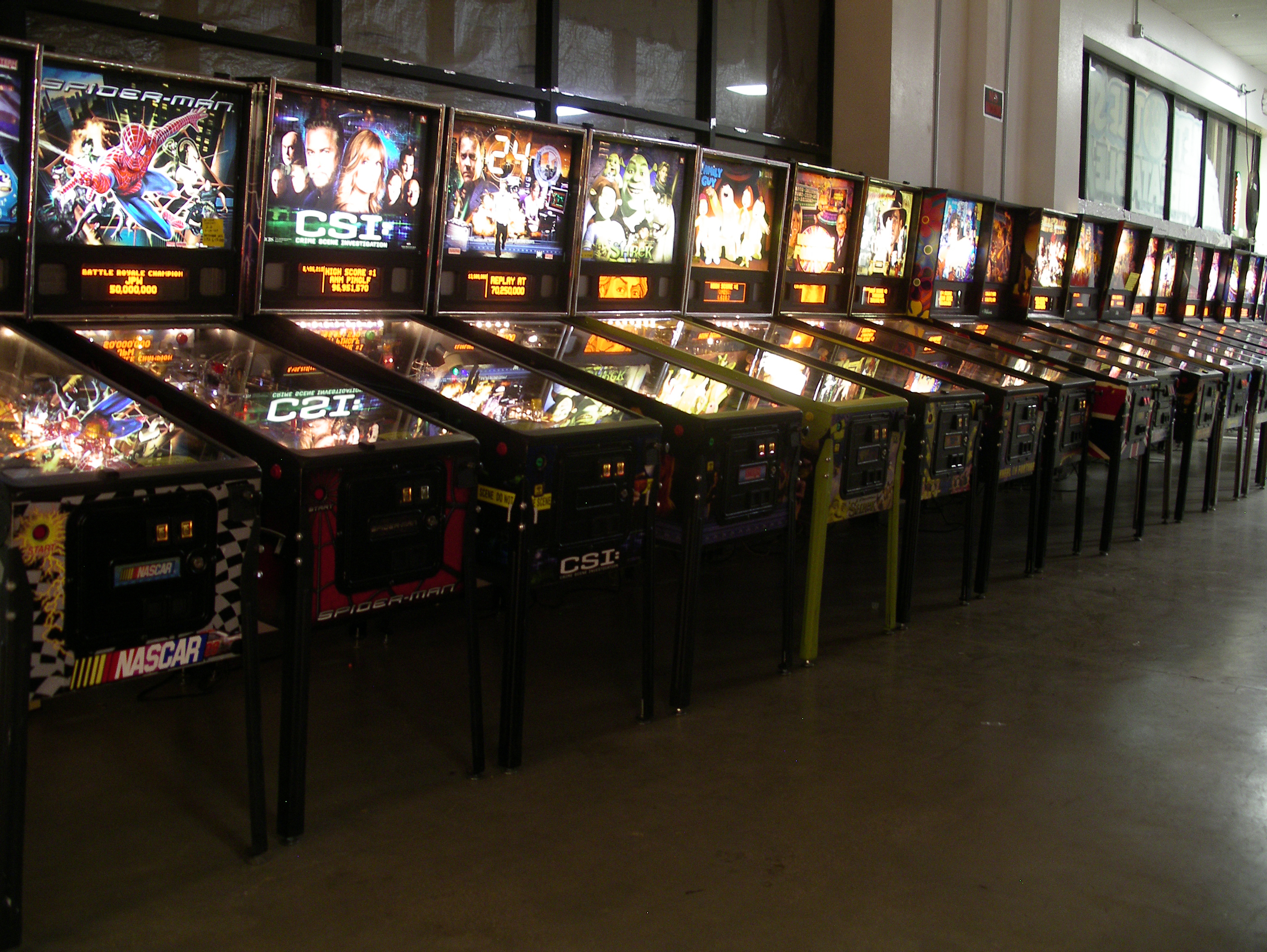
Newer pinball machines

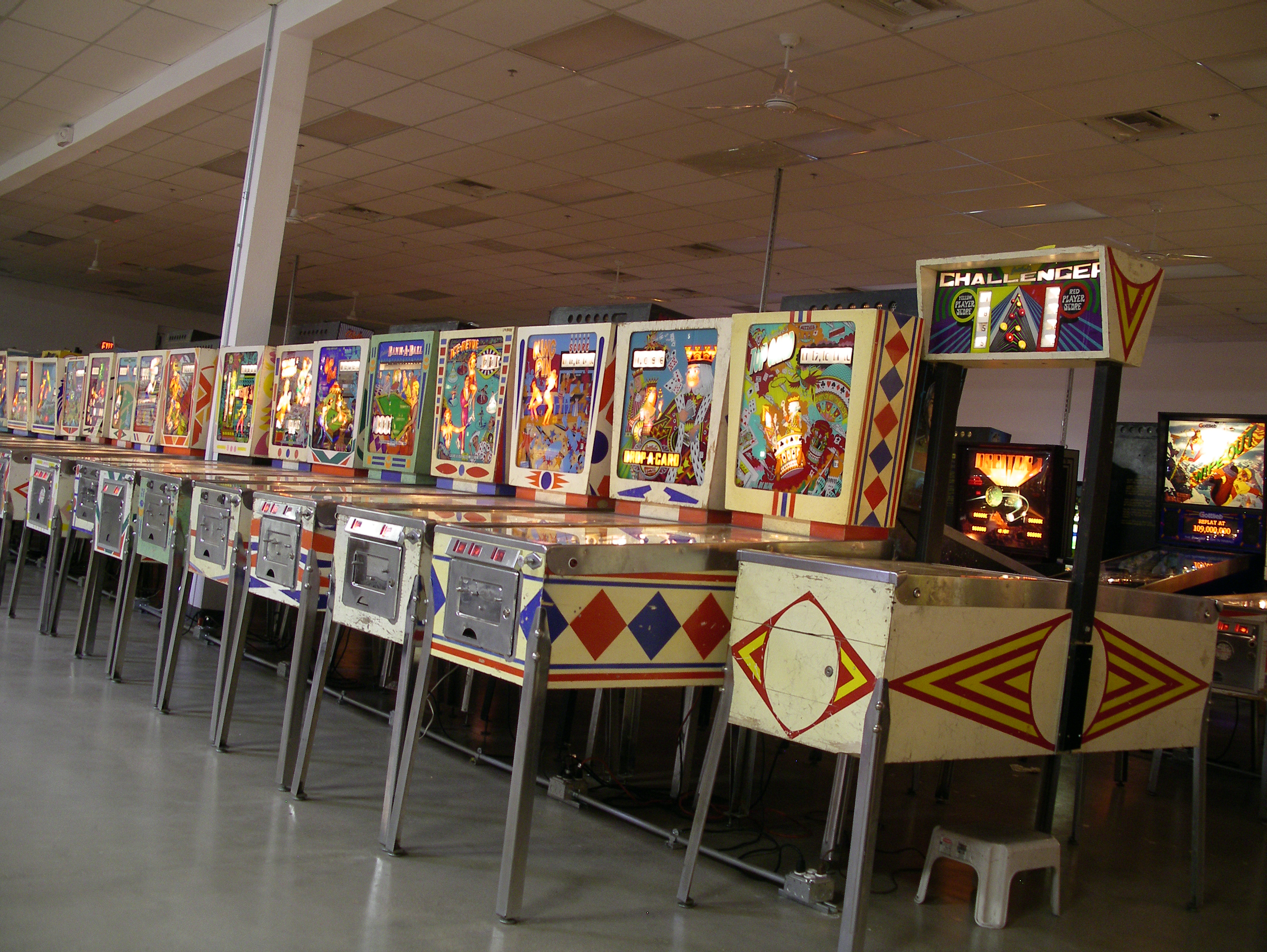
Classic pinball machines

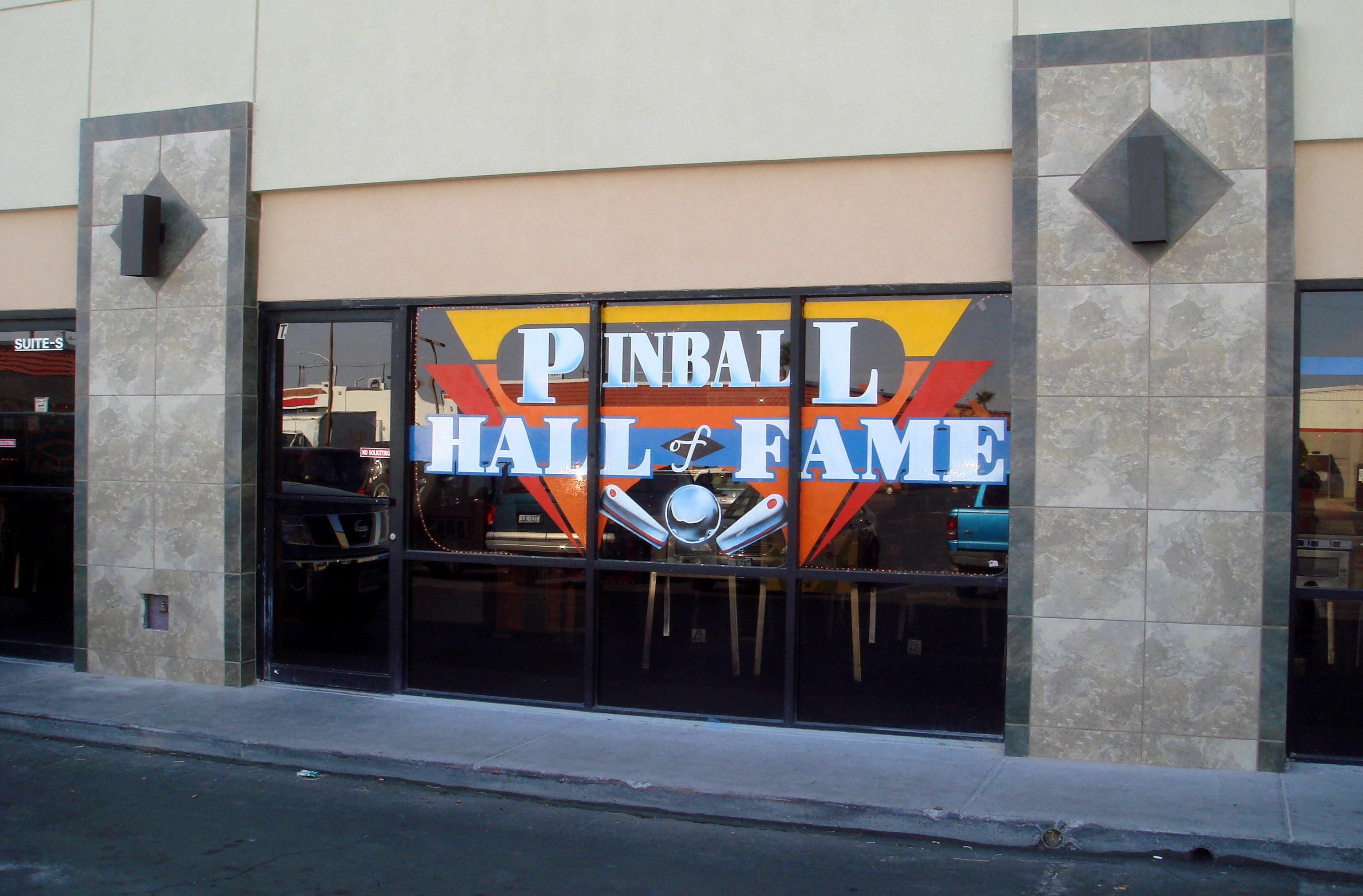
Original location of the Pinball Hall of Fame

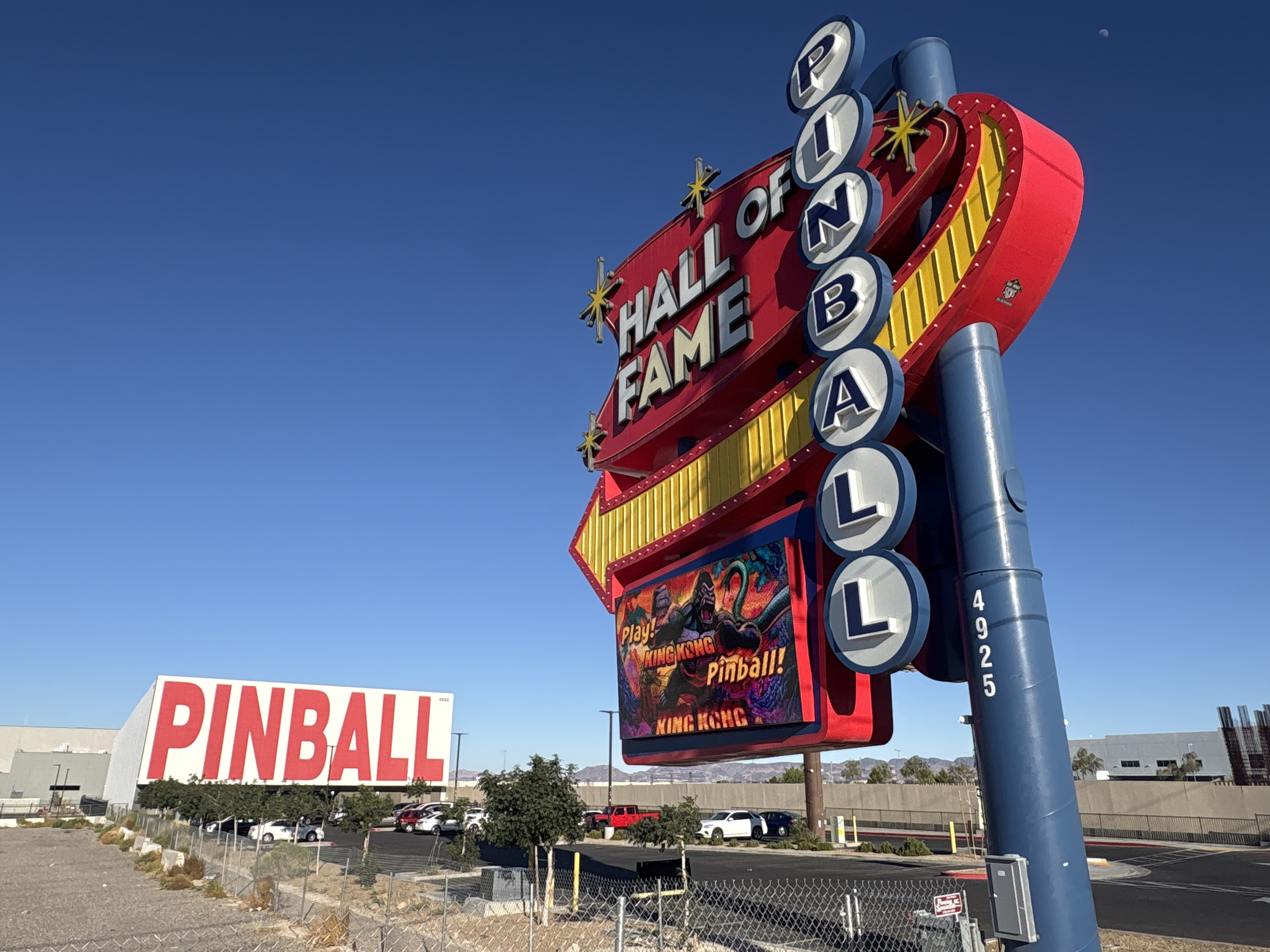
The Pinball Hall of Fame sign with the building in the background

== See also ==
- Pacific Pinball Museum, in Alameda, California
