= Taxi (pinball) =

1988 pinball machine

- version of flyer including Lola
- Manufacturer: Williams Electronics
- Release date: August 1988
- System: Williams System 11B
- Model #: 553
- Players: 1-4
- Design: Mark Ritchie; Python Anghelo
- Programming: Ed Boon
- Artwork: Python Anghelo
- Mechanics: Craig Fitpold; Tony Kraemer; Mark Kim
- Music: Chris Granner
- Sound: Chris Granner
- Production run: 7,300

Taxi is a pinball machine designed by Mark Ritchie and Python Anghelo, released in 1988 by Williams Electronics. The game is based on collecting various passengers in a taxi; an early version of the machine used a character bearing a resemblance to Marilyn Monroe, but was replaced with a different character to avoid licensing issues.

== Design ==
Originally Mark Ritchie intended the game to be based around Formula 1, a sequel to Steve Kordek's 1976 game Grand Prix. When Gottlieb released the similarly themed Victory in October 1987 that idea was abandoned. He then considered basing the game around airports or airplanes, but during a brainstorming session Python Anghelo conceived of the concept of a taxi with five passengers. They first decided to use Mikhail Gorbachev (shortened to Gorbie in the game), then Mark Ritchie suggested Dracula (shortened to Drac in the game) and Marilyn Monroe, with Python Anghelo adding Santa Claus and Pin-Bot. Using the Kennedy brothers on the drop targets was briefly suggested by Anghelo, but immediately dismissed for being tasteless. Mark Ritchie noted that 'taxi' is an instantly recognized theme spelled the same way in most countries.

=== Backbox ===
The name "Taxi" is on the front of the cabinet, and on a small illuminated topper shaped like a sign on top of a Taxi, and is not on the translite. The translite shows a taxi driver based on the artist in a yellow jumper and red cap with three pins, and sitting in his vehicle with a meter. The taxi uses the Williams logo as a car mascot. A real mirror is added just behind where the rear view mirror of the taxi is depicted.

The five potential passengers are prominently shown standing on the pavement hailing the Taxi. The woman is shown beside two cases, one of which has a "Hollywood or bust!" label on it. Gorbachev is shown wearing a hammer & sickle tie. A sign on the building identifies it as Williams pinball palace, with a list of games inside - Cyclone, Pin-Bot, Space Station, High Speed, Banzai Run, Comet, and Big Guns. There is a set of traffic lights on the backglass which illuminate throughout the game.

This is the first Williams game to display four player scores using only two alpha-numeric 16 character displays. The backbox includes an additional display showing the jackpot meter.

The game uses a dynamic music system using markers to adjust the key a tune was in.

=== Marilyn ===
Originally the machine featured a passenger named Marilyn, a blonde character in a red dress bearing a resemblance to Marilyn Monroe. When Roger Sharpe checked if permission from Marilyn Monroe's estate had been sought, the Roger Richmond Agency was contacted to try to obtain permission. A high royalty rate was quoted so Williams replaced the Marilyn passenger with a new passenger named Lola to avoid legal problems with the Marilyn Monroe likeness. Lola appears identical to Marilyn, with the exception of her hair; the Lola passenger was pictured brunette and later with red hair where the Marilyn character was blonde. Most of the first sample run of 200 games were shipped to Europe with 'Marilyn' before the change was made. Mark Ritchie named this new character, inspired by the 1970 The Kinks song "Lola" about a transvestite, which fits with her muscular biceps on the backglass.

The voice of Marilyn/Lola is performed by Trudy Ritchie, the wife of Mark Ritchie. The voice of Gorbie was recorded by Steve Ritchie, Drac was recorded by Mark Ritchie, and Santa was recorded by Chris Granner.

There were three versions of the flyer, one showing and naming Marilyn, one showing Marilyn but not naming any character, and the third with the modified artwork and naming Lola.

Marilyn version

Lola version

The hand-drawn artwork on the side of the machine shows Mark Ritchie driving the titular taxi, with a depiction of his dog Maggie running alongside the back wheel.

The start button on the left side of the front of the cabinet is a green button with the artwork around it completing the set of traffic lights. The game is the first to use a powered one-way gate which is controlled by a solenoid, improving on the spring steel one-way gate which had been used in earlier machines.

The game was designed to be "easy to understand, but difficult to master".

Several promotional items were produced for the game, including a Post-it note with a monochrome image of the elongated taxi from the plastic just above the shooter lane on the game.

The cover of the November 1988 issue of RePlay showed the design team in yellow Williams Taxi jumpers and red caps around a Taxi machine. One of these caps could be won by players at the AMOA expo '88 show if they could start the multiball.

== Layout ==
The whirlpool skillshot was designed by Anghelo. This spinout mechanism counts the number of revolutions made by the ball, and is designed with a spring steel flap exit to land the ball in a kicker which knocks the ball to the left into the C-A-B rollovers, centrally located above three jet bumpers. The game includes two crossover ramps with wireform returns; an element of the airport design idea remains with these ramps representing departure and arrival lanes at an airport. Much of the rest of the playfield also shows roads. On the far left there is a patent-applied for mechanism which had been used a year earlier on Big Guns; this catapults the ball up the left ramp. In the area between the left ramp and the bumpers there is a saucer, and a round stand-up target. On the right side of the machine there is a short lane leading to a saucer which can hold the ball. There are two banks of three drop targets, one in the center of the playfield below the bumpers, and the other on the far right.

=== Playfield artwork ===
There are various taxi's around the playfield. One has fish in the boot, unintentionally foreshadowing Fish Tales which was not conceived until a few years later. Another near the entrance to the left ramp is shown having just run over a cat, and a cat-screech is heard when the player hits that ramp. In the right outlane is a towing truck for Ken's towing with a damaged taxi, referring to Ken Fedesna, who was a senior executive of Williams at the time.

In common with many Williams machines of this period it includes a cow, this is shown riding in the sidecar of a motorcycle near the right flipper.

The long plastic with an elongated taxi just above the shooter lane shows the driver with all five passengers; Gorbie and Pin-Bot are playing chess, and Drac is biting the woman.

== Gameplay ==
The game is controlled with two flippers and a manual plunger. At the start of each ball the player performs a skillshot to try to launch the ball with the correct force for five revolutions of the spinout bowl to score the maximum 100K points (with applicable multiplier), but avoid a sixth revolution which resets the score awarded to 1K.

The main goal of the game is to pick up five passengers: Pin-Bot, Gorbie, Lola (or Marilyn in the early version), Drac, and Santa Claus who are represented by inserts on the playfield. Drac, Santa, and Gorbie are each located at a particular shot around the playfield, whereas Lola and Pin-Bot are each associated with one of the banks of drop-targets. When one of the potential passengers hails for a taxi, a light behind them in the backbox illuminates. Collecting all five passengers lights the Jackpot, which is available to collect for a few seconds; if the player is unsuccessful Lola gets out of the taxi and must be picked up again. If "carry passengers" is not lit, all passengers are lost when the ball drains.

Underneath the score display are a series of five awards which can be collected during the game. The game has a two ball multiball.

== Reception ==
Pinball Trader found it to be an above average game rating it at 6/10, criticizing some of the rules calling it a "safe game which breaks little ground".

Pinball Player found it to be a challenging game, and underrated with the sound effects praised, and the backglass called imaginative.

The pinball machine appeared in Madonna's Sex book in 1992, with her on top of the playfield in an unusual pose.

== Digital versions ==
Taxi released for various platforms in Pinball Hall of Fame: The Williams Collection between 2008 and 2011. The same developer released it for season two of The Pinball Arcade in 2013, and was available until June 30, 2018, when all Williams tables were removed due to licensing issues.

A version with optional animations released for Pinball FX on August 14, 2025.
