= Fish Tales (pinball) =

1992 pinball machine

- Manufacturer: Williams
- Release date: October 1992
- System: Williams WPC (Fliptronics II)
- Design: Mark Ritchie
- Programming: Mark Penacho
- Artwork: Pat McMahon
- Mechanics: Jack Skalon
- Music: Chris Granner
- Sound: Chris Granner
- Concept: Mark Ritchie, Python Anghelo, Pat McMahon
- Animation: Scott Slomiany
- Production run: 13,640 units

Fish Tales is a fishing-themed pinball game released by Williams in 1992. It is one of Williams 20 most produced pinball machines, selling 13,640 units.

The designer, Mark Ritchie, was a very occasional fisherman and he was inspired by the popularity of fishing to use this theme. The general goal is to catch fish and tell the most outlandish stories about their size.

== Design ==
After talking about using fishing as a pinball theme, Mark Ritchie, Python Anghelo, Pat McMahon and one other went on a fishing trip on Lake Michigan. Early concepts for the machine included a boat elevated above the playfield, with a fishing rod magnet to catch balls for multiball.

The machine's backglass is topped with a plastic fish that thrashes its tail when the player achieves certain goals. This was one of the parts of the design remaining by Python Anghelo after his design for the backglass was rejected by the designer. It was originally intended that the fish turn its head to speak to the player, but this idea was abandoned. Big Mouth Billy Bass was invented in 1998 and capitalized on this idea which Python Anghelo felt it was ripped off, although an example of multiple discovery may be more likely. Anghelo also conceived of the "stretch the truth" feature, and the fish heads at the lower flippers as part of the playfield artwork.

The backglass was designed by Pat McMahon and shows himself as the fisherman (wearing a cap saying "Max") in the boat attempting to catch a monster-sized fish; this boat is called Crazy John. The character in the smaller boat is based on Mark Ritchie, and the worm is a representation of Jim Patla, an earlier pinball designer who the artist had worked with. Other members of the design team are also referenced: MP (Mark Penacho) is on a bag in the boat, Skalon (Jack Skalon) is on the sole of one of the shoes of the man thrown overboard, CG (Chris Granner) is on one of the beer cans.

After the prototype machine was produced, the French distributor played the game and requested for it to be made more difficult. It was decided to make shorter flippers for the French market, so Fish Tales introduced flippers with lightning bolts on them that are about 1/8 inch (3.2 mm) shorter than other standard Williams flippers. While seemingly minor, this extra gap creates a far greater ball control challenge for the player. In what Mark Ritchie later called "a huge mistake" these shorter flippers were used on all machines, including those for the U.S. market. More machines were sold to France than any other country.

The voice line "Biggest fish I ever saw" was recorded by George Petro, Mark Ritchie recorded the voice of the fishing tournament announcer.

The centre captive-ball shot was designed to be high-risk with a high probability of a centre drain unless hit perfectly.

The video mode is shooting water-skiers and speedboats with torpedoes. This was inspired by an event several years earlier when Mark Ritchie was fishing with his father on a lake in California and water-skiers went past causing their boat to rock from the wake; and his father exclaimed "wouldn't it be great if we had a torpedo".

The game is the first to use patented opto-flipper button switches to control the game.

== Layout ==
The table has an autoplunger triggered by a button in a handle shaped like a fishing rod; this uses a similar mechanism to that first introduced in Terminator 2: Judgment Day and is protected by a patent.

The game has a left orbit which contains a spinner and leads to a saucer in the top right corner, the right orbit can loop round to the left, or the ball can fall into the L-I-E rollovers above the bumpers. The central features of the game are the boat and the rod and reel. The boat faces towards the top of the playfield and has two ramps leading from it which return the ball to the flipper on that side of the machine with wireforms. These ramps criss-cross in a similar way to Taxi. Between the entrance to these ramps at the stern of the boat is a captive ball in a short channel with a target at the end. To the right of the boat is a lane including a drop-target, and ending in an upkicker to the caster's club, exiting on a wireform running across the playfield to a fishing reel shaped ball-lock mechanism. After a ball is locked, this patent protected mechanism rotates ready for the next ball. There are three stand-up targets on either side of the machine.

== Gameplay ==
The player begins a game by casting a ball onto the playfield by pressing the autoplunger button. The primary objective of the game is to score super jackpots during multiball. Shots to the Caster's Club "lock" balls. After three locks multiball starts with the balls released from the reel in a chaotic way. During multiball, shooting the Caster's Club lock then prompts the player to shoot the left orbit to reach the saucer for a jackpot. Completing three levels (tropical fishing, fresh water fishing, deep sea fishing) by scoring three jackpots then allows the player to collect super jackpots by hitting the captive ball in the center of the table.

The boat contains a ladder of awards which are lit with long cast shots at the right orbit, and collected by hitting the captive ball to hit the target behind it. These include the lighting the video mode where waterskiers are shot at with torpedoes using the button on the handle; there are near, middle, and far horizontal lanes of these and after shooting enough of them either an EB (extra ball) or BS (big score) target can appear. There is also "rock the boat" where the player attempts to hit as many ramp shots as possible in a short period of time. The final award is instant multiball which starts the main multiball without needing to lock balls.

At times the saucer is lit for "fish finder" random awards. This saucer is also where the video mode is started. Additionally there are three further features related to catching fish:

- Catching Fish – Two sets of side targets allow the player to catch fish. When a set of fish is collected from either group of targets, the player has a few seconds to shoot the spinner to "Stretch The Truth" about its size, from 1× to 5× actual size (points for the catch multiplied accordingly), or a "total lie" which awards the player nothing for the fish. However, completing the L-I-E rollovers removes the lowest value from "Stretch The Truth" and advances the bonus multiplier.
- Monster Fish: Six shots to the lit criss-crossing center ramps light "Monster Fish" on the spinner, a "Hurry-Up" that can be worth 20 to 50 Million points.
- Feeding Frenzy: Four caught fish light the two ramps and two loops, and if all shots are made quickly a bonus score is added.

== Reception ==
An article in The Flipside found it to be a fun to play game, and a "refreshing departure" from the recent run of licensed tables.

== Digital versions ==
Fish Tales released for The Pinball Arcade in 2014, and was available until the Williams license expired on June 30, 2018.

It was added as a free table for alongside the release of Williams Pinball volume 1 for Pinball FX 3 on October 9, 2018, with a free remastered version released for Pinball FX on April 13, 2023. Both of these versions include an animated fisherman.

== Fish Tales: Ultimate Fishing Challenge ==
An upgrade kit called Fish Tales: Ultimate Fishing Challenge was released by Cardona Pinball in 2026. The song Barracuda by Heart was licensed for use in the game; the same song had inspired artwork for Barracora in 1981. New artwork for the backbox was created by Brian Allen.
