= WMS Industries =

American gaming and amusement company

WMS Industries, Inc.
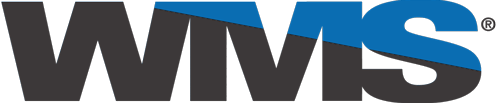

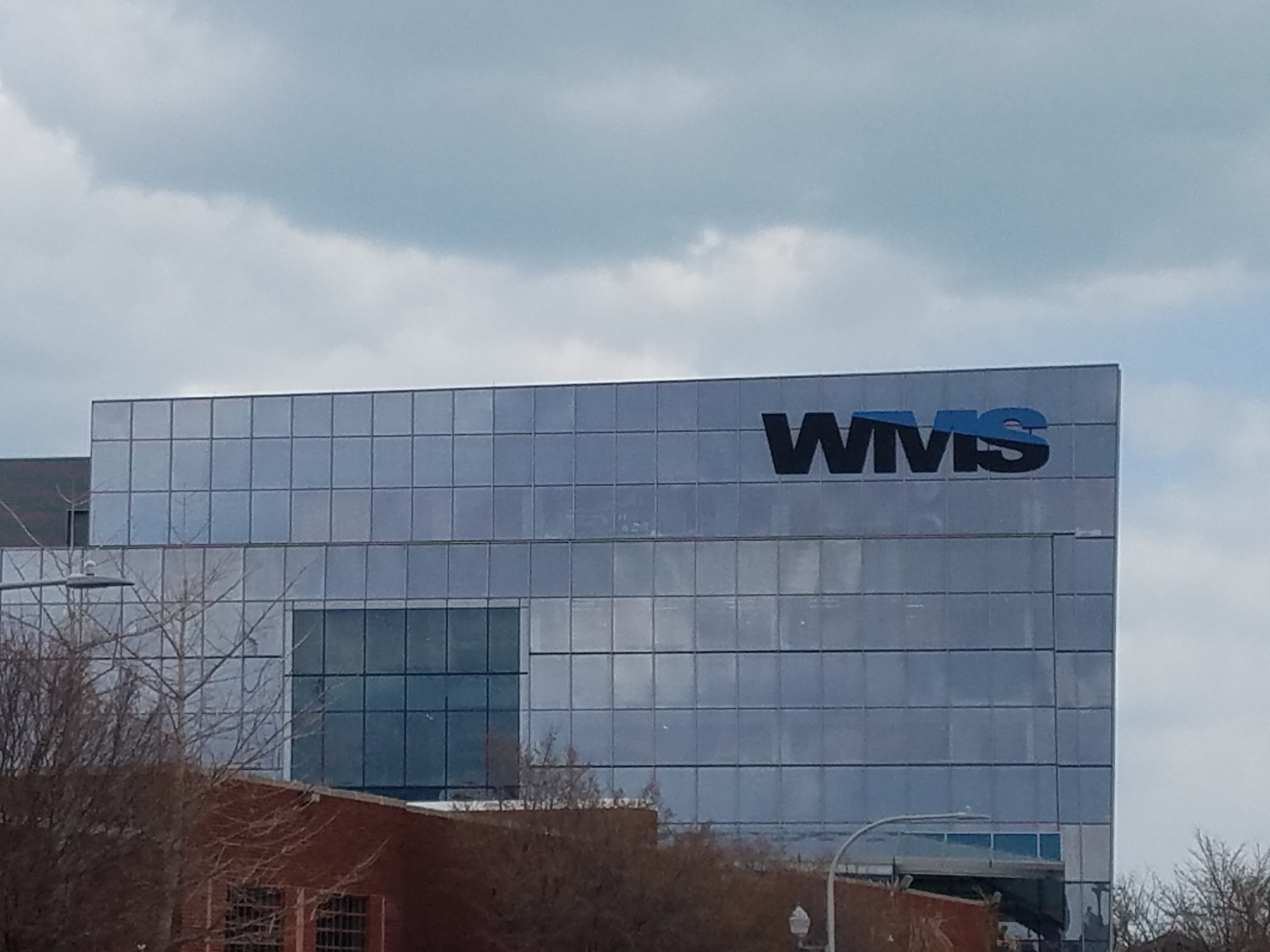
- Former headquarters in Chicago, IL
- Industry: Gaming technology
- Predecessor: Williams Manufacturing Company
- Founded: 1974, in Chicago, Illinois, US
- Defunct: 2016
- Fate: Merged into parent Scientific Games
- Headquarters: Enterprise, Nevada, US
- Products: Pinball tables, Arcade games, Slot machines, online gambling, mobile gambling, gaming software/hardware development
- Parent: Seeburg (1974–1977); Xcor International (1977–1981); Scientific Games Corporation (2013–2016)

WMS Industries, Inc. was an American electronic gaming and amusement manufacturer in Enterprise, Nevada. It was merged into Scientific Games in 2016. WMS's predecessor was the Williams Manufacturing Company, founded in 1943 by Harry E. Williams. However, the company that became WMS Industries was formally founded in 1974 as Williams Electronics, Inc.

Williams initially was a manufacturer of pinball machines. In 1964, Williams was acquired by jukebox manufacturer Seeburg Corp. and reorganized as Williams Electronics Manufacturing Division. In 1973, the company branched out into the coin-operated arcade video game market with its Pong clone Paddle Ball, eventually creating a number of video game classics, including Defender, Joust, and Robotron: 2084. In 1974, Williams Electronics, Inc. was incorporated as a wholly owned subsidiary of Seeburg, which changed its name to Xcor International in 1977. Williams Electronics was spun out as an independent company in 1981 after Seeburg filed for bankruptcy in 1979.

In 1987, the company went public as WMS Industries, Inc. using a shortened version of its name which it also selected for its stock ticker symbol. In 1988, it acquired Bally/Midway, the amusement games division of Bally Manufacturing, which had decided to focus on its casino operating and manufacturing businesses. The video game operations were consolidated under the Midway name, while pinball machines continued to use the Williams and Bally names. After a string of arcade successes by Midway, WMS acquired Tradewest in 1994 to allow the company to publish its own home ports of arcade games directly, instead of licensing them to other publishers. Midway Games was taken public in 1996, and fully spun-off in 1998.

WMS created a subsidiary, WMS Gaming, for manufacturing gambling equipment in 1991. Beginning with video lottery terminals, the division introduced its first slot machines in 1994 and became a major player in the business. It closed its pinball division on October 25, 1999 after the Pinball 2000 concept that integrated a PC screen into the pinball game via a semi-reflective glass failed to meet sales expectations. In 2013, WMS became a wholly owned subsidiary of Scientific Games. In 2016, WMS was merged into Scientific Games, which renamed itself Light & Wonder in 2022.

== Early history ==
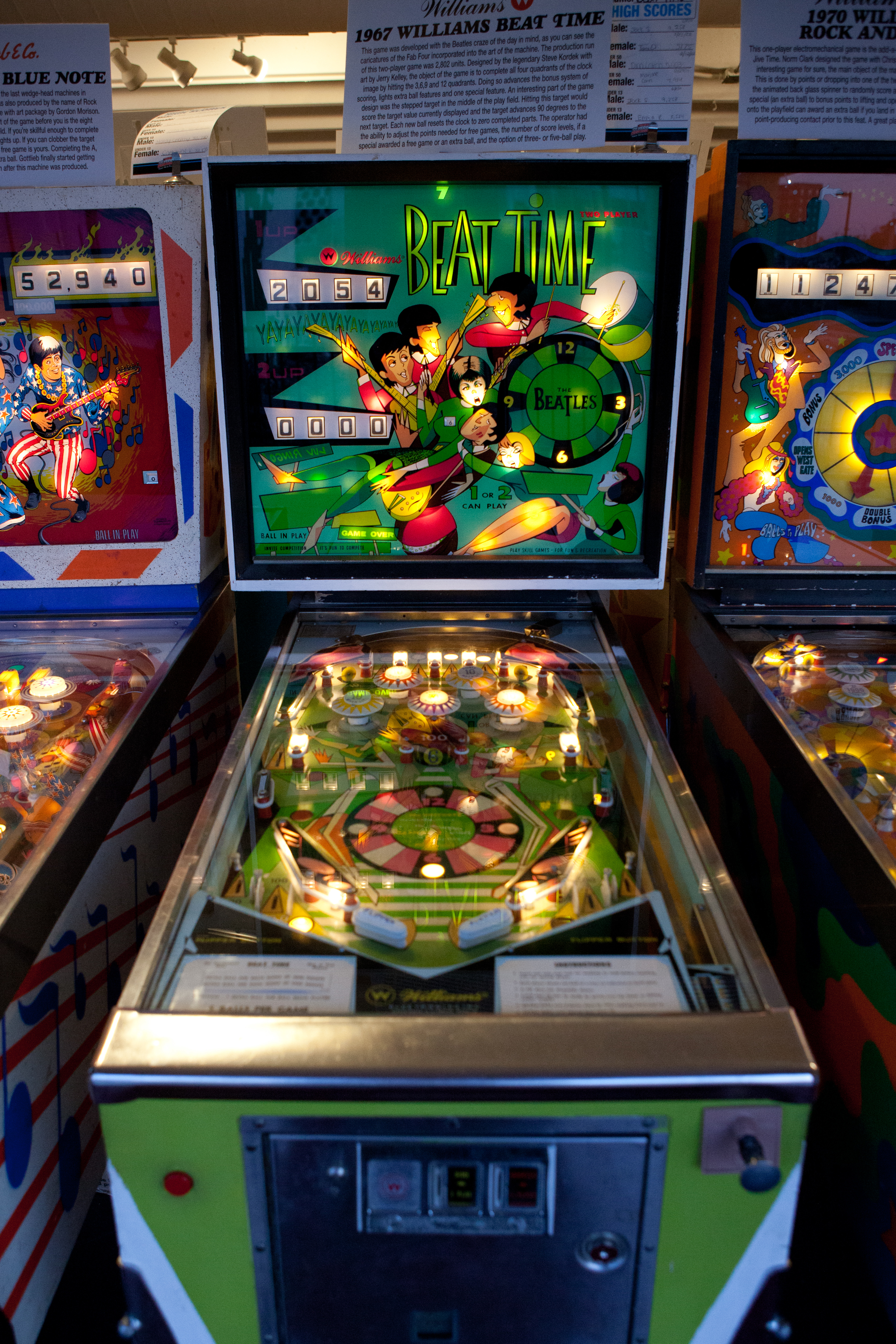
1967 Williams Pinball Game with a Beatles theme, Beat Time

Stanford engineering graduate Harry Williams entered the coin-operated amusement industry in 1933 and helped popularize several important pinball innovations such as the tilt mechanism, electrically-powered scoring holes, and the ability to win a free play by achieving a certain score. After working for a succession of companies including Pacific Amusement Manufacturing, Rock-Ola, and Exhibit Supply, he went into business with Lyndon Durant in 1942 under the name United Manufacturing. After a break with Durant, Williams founded the Williams Manufacturing Company in 1943 at 161 West Huron Street in Chicago, Illinois. The first seven products were a fortune-telling machine called Selector Scope (1944), two electro-mechanical (EM) games, Periscope (1944) and Liberator (1944), a novelty called Zingo (1944), a pinball conversion called Flat-Top (1945), another EM arcade game, Circus Romance (1945) and a second pinball conversion called Laura (1945). The two pinball conversions (Flat-Top & Laura) were built by purchasing older pinball machines made by other companies and changing artwork and other elements on the playfield. The lack of raw materials during World War II made the manufacture of new machines difficult and expensive. The first all original amusement device made by Williams was a flipperless pinball machine called Suspense (1946). During the late 1940s and early 1950s, Williams continued to make pinball machines and the occasional bat-and-ball game. In 1950, Williams produced Lucky Inning, its first pinball machine to have its bottom flippers facing inward in the modern manner.

The Williams logo, used on products through much of the company's history. The "W" symbol was added to the wordmark c. 1962.

In 1948, Williams sold 49% of his company to a Philadelphia distributor named Sam Stern, who became a vice president and took over much of the day-to-day running of the company. In 1959, Stern orchestrated a buyout of Williams by Consolidated Sun Ray, a New York retail conglomerate that operated drug stores and discount houses, which renamed the company the Williams Electronic Manufacturing Corporation. Harry Williams left after the buyout, though did occasional work for the company. The last game he designed for Williams was also one of the last electromechanical games, Rancho (1977).

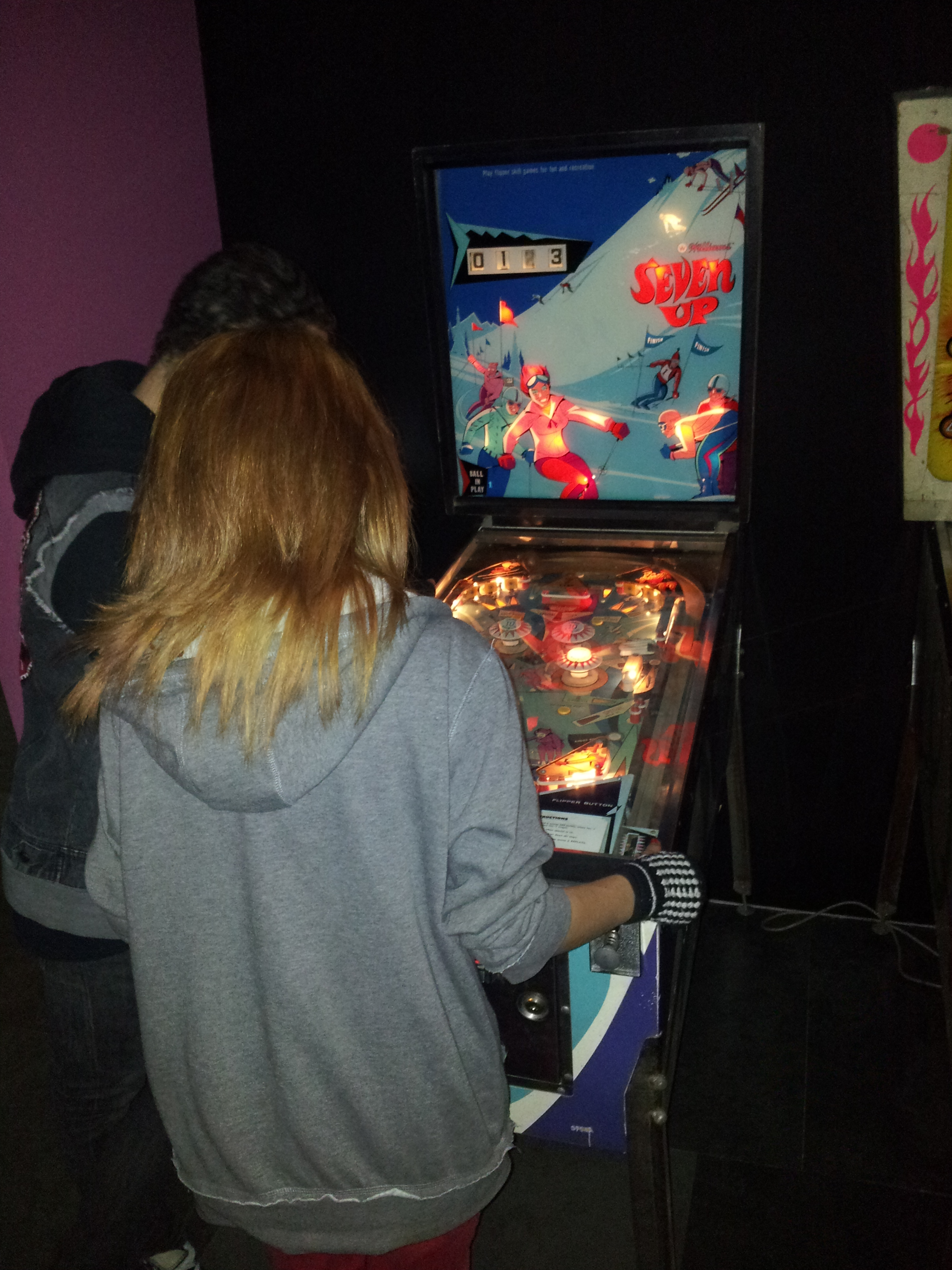
Playing a '60s Seven Up pinball

In 1961, Stern bought Williams back from Consolidated Sun Ray. Three years later, the company was acquired by the Seeburg Corporation, which also purchased United Manufacturing. The two amusement companies were consolidated under the Williams name, but moved into the United factory. Sam Stern continued to run the amusement business, which was renamed Williams Electronics in 1967.

In 1962, 3 Coin became the best selling Williams machine with 1,100 units sold. One year later, Skill Pool sold 2,250 units. In 1964 Williams was purchased by the Seeburg Corporation. Its 1966 pinball machine A-Go-Go, with its avant-garde 60s theme, sold a record 5,100 units. Early Williams pinball machines often included innovative features and pinball firsts, such as mechanical reel scoring and the "add-a-ball" feature for locations that didn't allow game replays. By 1967, pinball was in the middle of its so-called "golden age", and the number of pinball units that sold began to increase dramatically. Popular Williams pinballs included Shangri-La (1967), Apollo (1967), Beat Time (1967), Smart Set (1969), Gold Rush (1971), and Space Mission (1976).

== Golden age of arcade games ==
Taking note of Atari, Inc.'s success with Pong in 1972, Williams decided to enter the fledgling coin-operated arcade video game industry. After preliminary negotiations with Magnavox, it subcontracted the Magnetic Corporation of America to create its first arcade video game Paddle-Ball. In 1974, the company was reincorporated as Williams Electronics, Inc. In 1980, Seeburg, facing bankruptcy, sold Williams to Louis Nicastro, who, with his son Neil, would take the company public and run it for over two decades.

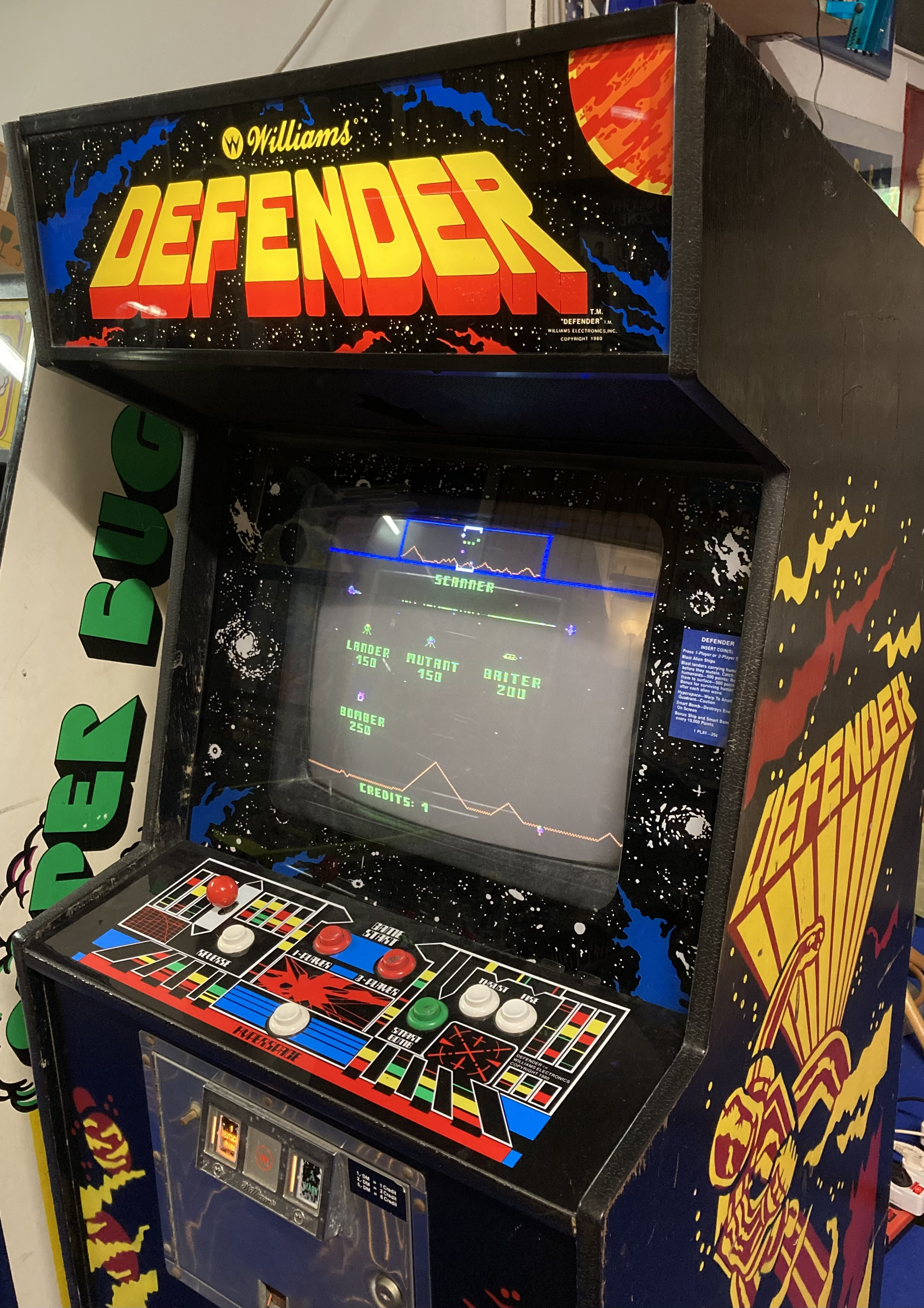
Williams Defender arcade game

Williams developed its own breakthrough hit with the release of 1981's Defender, whose gameplay, horizontal scrolling, and dynamic color influenced many subsequent games. It was followed by a sequel in the same year, Stargate, and a group of popular and influential titles: Joust, Robotron: 2084, Sinistar, and the licensed Moon Patrol. With the exception of Sinistar, these were widely ported to home systems by external developers and publishers including Atari.

After Dragon's Lair popularized LaserDisc video games in 1983, Williams created the LaserDisc/computer graphics hybrid racing game Star Rider which lost, or contributed to a loss of, $50 million for the company.

In 1988, Williams acquired Bally/Midway, the consolidated amusement games subsidiary of longtime competitor Bally Manufacturing, which left the business to concentrate on casinos. Midway saw strong sales in the early 1990s with a number of successful arcade games, including Mortal Kombat and NBA Jam. During the peak, in 1990, the company signed a deal with Acclaim Entertainment where Acclaim was given home rights to WMS' arcade titles with an option of right of first refusal in its contracts. In 1994, the company acquired Tradewest, which it renamed Williams Entertainment, to publish home ports of Midway arcade games. Two years later, WMS acquired Atari Games from Time Warner. That same year, all video game operations were consolidated under Midway, with Atari Games becoming Midway Games West and Williams Entertainment becoming Midway Home Entertainment, while all pinball rights remained with WMS under the Williams brand.

== Solid state pinball ==
Williams' first solid-state machines produced in 1976 were prototype runs based on electromechanical games; Aztec (1976) and Grand Prix. Williams continued to release new electromechanical pinball machines through October 1977, when it released its last, Wild Card. From November 1977, Williams released solid-state pinball games exclusively, beginning with its first solid state production model Hot Tip (1977), which sold 4,903 units (the electromechanical version previously released in June sold 1,300 units). From the late 1970s through the 1980s, Williams released numerous innovative pinball games, such as Gorgar (1979, the first pinball featuring a synthetic voice), Firepower (1980), Black Knight (1980, the first featuring multiple levels), Jungle Lord (1981), Space Shuttle (1984), Comet (1985), High Speed (1986), Pin*Bot (1986), F-14 Tomcat (1987), Cyclone (1988), and Taxi (1988).

From 1989 through the mid 1990s, a resurgence of pinball during which machines transitioned to dot-matrix displays, Williams had a string of hits including Black Knight 2000, FunHouse, The Machine: Bride of Pin-Bot, Terminator 2, Fish Tales, and The Getaway: High Speed II.

In 1992, the company produced the licensed The Addams Family pinball game based on The Addams Family movie (1991) under the Bally label. The Addams Family sold 20,270 units, a record that still stands today. In 1993, the company produced Twilight Zone, which sold 15,235 units. After 1993, though still the market leader, Williams never came close to matching these sales numbers. Williams won the American Amusement Machine Association's 1995 Manufacturer of the Year award. Medieval Madness, produced in 1997, often tops the list as the greatest pinball machine of all time.

In 1999, Williams made one last attempt to revitalize pinball sales with its Pinball 2000 machines that integrated pinball with computer graphics on embedded raster-scan displays. The innovation did not pay off, as the manufacturing expenses exceeded the prices that the market would bear, and that same year, WMS left pinball to focus on slot machine development.

== Focus on gambling machines ==
As the pinball industry declined, WMS invested in the hotel industry, successfully taking public and then spinning off its hotel subsidiary, WHG Resorts, in 1996 (which was later taken private and acquired by Wyndham International).

=== First slot machines ===
WMS entered the reel-spinning slot machine market in 1994, and its products have helped to move the industry trend away from generic mechanical slot machines and toward games that incorporate familiar intellectual properties. For more than a century beginning in the late 1800s, mechanical slot machine reels employed limited themes: card suits, horseshoes, bells and stars, varieties of fruit, black bars and the Liberty Bell. WMS's video gaming roots would prove to be its strength when, in 1996, it introduced its first hit casino slot machine, Reel 'em In, a "multi-line, multi-coin secondary bonus" video slot machine. WMS followed this with a number of similar successful games like Jackpot Party, Boom and Filthy Rich. Meanwhile, by 1996, WMS had transferred all of the copyrights and trademarks in its video game library to Midway, including Defender, Stargate, Robotron: 2084, Joust and Smash TV, as it took Midway public and finally spun it off in 1998. With the closing of its pinball division in 1999, WMS focused entirely on the gaming machine industry. During the 1990s, that industry grew as additional states permitted casino gambling and video lottery games and as Native American tribes built gaming casinos.

By 2001, WMS introduced its very successful Monopoly-themed series of "participation" slots, which the company licenses or leases to casinos, instead of selling the games to the casinos. The company's participation games have included machines based on such well-known entertainment-related brands as Men in Black, The Price Is Right, Match Game, Hollywood Squares, Clint Eastwood, Powerball, Green Acres, The Dukes of Hazzard, Top Gun, The Wizard of Oz, Star Trek, The Lord of the Rings and Clue. Some of these games are networked within casinos and even between multiple casinos so that players have a chance to win large jackpots based on the total amount of play received by all of the machines in the network. These branded games proved popular with players and profitable for WMS, as the net licensing revenues and lease fees generated by each game have exceeded the profit margins of its games for sale. Other recent games include Brazilian Beauty and Hot Hot Super Jackpot. WMS Industries acquired a second subsidiary, Netherlands-based gaming company Orion Financement Company B.V., in July 2006.

From fiscal year 2006 to 2011 the company's revenues grew from $451 million to $783 million, respectively, and its net income reached $113 million in 2010. The company's revenues decreased to $690 million in 2012.

=== Later products, technology, business ===
WMS continued to produce video gaming machines and, to a smaller extent, reel-spinning slots, for sale and for lease to casinos in the U.S., selected foreign markets and state lotteries. Some of WMS's product designs reflected the changing demographics of its industry. Younger players raised on video games often seek more challenging experiences, both physical and mental, than do women age 55 to 65 – the traditional audience for slot machines. Accordingly, some of the company's machines incorporate surround sound, flat-panel display screens and animated, full-color images.

WMS also manufactured the G+ series of video reel slots, the Community Gaming family of interconnected slots, as well as mechanical reels, poker games, and video lottery terminals. WMS began to offer online gaming in 2010 to persons over 18 years old in the UK and in 2011 in the US at www.jackpotparty.com. In 2012, WMS partnered with Large Animal Games to incorporate several of WMS's slot machine games into a cruise ship-themed Facebook game application titled "Lucky Cruise". By playing games and enlisting Facebook friends' help, players can accumulate "lucky charms" (instead of money). The game play is similar to playing a slot machine but includes a "light strategy component". In 2012, the company introduced gaming on mobile devices and focused its efforts on expanding its online game offerings. For casinos, it introduced My Poker video poker games.

WMS technologies included:

- Transmissive Reels gaming platform, which employs video animation that is displayed around, over and seemingly interactively with mechanical reels. The technology is based on the CPU-NXT2 operating platform.
- Operating Platforms: CPU-NXT2 incorporates an Intel Pentium IV class processor, up to 2 gigabytes of random-access memory, an ATI 3-D graphics chip-set, and a 40 gigabyte hard disk drive. The CPU-NXT3 operating platform was introduced in 2012 for participation games and new cabinets.
- Cabinets: The Bluebird2 gaming cabinet, which includes a dual 22-inch widescreen, high-definition displays, Bose speakers, and an illuminated printer and bill acceptor, was introduced in 2008. The Blade and Gamefield xD cabinets were introduced in 2013.

Approximately 70% of WMS's revenues in 2010 were derived from U.S. customers. Its design facilities at the time were in Chicago, Illinois. It had other facilities and offices across the United States and international development and distribution facilities located in Argentina, Australia, Austria, Canada, China, India, Mexico, the Netherlands, South Africa, Spain and the United Kingdom and an online gaming center in Belgium.

=== Williams Interactive ===
In 2012, WMS acquired Sweden-based Jadestone Group AB and then Iowa-based Phantom EFX, which, later that year, became part of a new subsidiary, Williams Interactive. The subsidiary was formed to serve the online gaming industry. At the same time, the company launched its Facebook social casino game Jackpot Party Casino. Later that year, Betsson and Unibet online casinos entered multi-year agreements with Williams Interactive to provide "premium video slot games as Jackpot Party, Zeus or Reel 'Em In ... to their registered players (more than 12 million customers)". In 2014, EveryMatrix, partnered with Williams Interactive to offer online slot content from Williams Interactive.

== Acquisition by Scientific Games ==
WMS merged with Scientific Games in October 2013, becoming a wholly owned subsidiary of Scientific Games. Scientific Games paid $1.5 billion for WMS, and WMS shareholders received $26.00 per share. The following year, Scientific Games also acquired Bally Technologies, the successor to the original Bally Manufacturing's slot machine operations. In 2016, WMS was reorganized and fully merged into Scientific Games. In 2022, Scientific Games spun off its namesake lottery terminal operations and took the name Light & Wonder. WMS is retained as a brand of L&W, along with Bally and Shuffle Master.
