= CastleStorm =

2013 video game

- Logo
- Developer: Zen Studios
- Publisher: Zen Studios (Note: Xbox 360 version published by Microsoft Game Studios.)
- Composer: Waterflame
- Platforms: Xbox 360: Windows; PlayStation 3; PlayStation Vita; Wii U; Amazon; Android; iOS; PlayStation 4; Xbox One; Nintendo Switch
- Release: May 29, 2013: Xbox 360; May 29, 2013; Windows; July 29, 2013; PlayStation 3, Vita; NA: November 5, 2013; PAL: November 6, 2013; Wii U; December 26, 2013; Amazon, Android, iOS; May 8, 2014; PlayStation 4, Xbox One; NA: September 23, 2014; EU: September 24, 2014; Nintendo Switch; August 16, 2018
- Genre: Tower defense
- Modes: Single-player, multiplayer

CastleStorm is a 2013 game developed by Zen Studios for Xbox 360, Windows, PlayStation 3, PlayStation Vita, and Wii U. A remastered version titled CastleStorm: Definitive Edition was released in 2014 for PlayStation 4 and Xbox One. A free-to-play mobile version titled CastleStorm: Free to Siege was released in 2014 for Amazon, Android, and iOS. The game also received a virtual reality adaptation for Oculus Rift, Samsung Gear VR, and PlayStation VR. A sequel titled CastleStorm 2 was released on July 31, 2020.

== Gameplay ==
CastleStorm is a side-scrolling physics-based real-time strategy game with tower defense elements. The player plays a number of characters obtained from completing separate game "campaigns", starting with the default character, Sir Gareth who is introduced in the first campaign, Kingdom Quest. There are four separate campaigns featured in the game, all set in slightly different points of time, with the last being, "The Warrior Queen".

== Plot ==
Sir Gareth, protector of the realm is fighting Vikings. The knights and vikings have had a longstanding peace, but it breaks when ancient crystal is stolen. It falls to Sir Gareth to rally the troops, retrieve the gem, and restore peace to the land.

== Release ==
CastleStorm was initially released for Xbox 360 via Xbox Live Arcade (XBLA) on May 29, 2013 through publisher Microsoft Game Studios. It was released as a self-published title for all subsequent releases, first being made available for Windows via Steam two months later on July 29. Ports for PlayStation 3 and PlayStation Vita were released on November 5, 2013 in North America and on November 6 in Europe, with a Wii U version following one month later on December 26. A remastered version of the title including both pieces of downloadable content was released for PlayStation 4 and Xbox One as CastleStorm: Definitive Edition on September 23 in North America and September 24 in Europe. A port for Nintendo Switch was made available on August 16, 2018.

=== Downloadable content ===
CastleStorm received two pieces of downloadable content (DLC) entitled CastleStorm: From Outcast to Savior, and CastleStorm: The Warrior Queen. The first expansion was released for XBLA and Steam on July 31, 2013. The second expansion was made available the same year for Steam on September 25, and for XBLA on September 27. Both were released simultaneously for PlayStation 3 and Vita on November 26, 2013. From Outcast to Savior and The Warrior Queen were released for Wii U in 2014 on February 26 and March 13, respectively.

=== Adaptations ===
A mobile adaptation was released for Android, iOS, and Kindle devices on May 8, 2014, as CastleStorm - Free to Siege. A virtual reality adaptation of the title titled CastleStorm VR was released for Oculus Rift and Samsung Gear VR devices on July 7, 2016, and for PlayStation VR on August 1, 2017.

== Reception ==
Reception

Aggregate score
Aggregator	Score
Metacritic	(X360) 79/100 (PC) 73/100 (Vita) 79/100 (Wii U) 83/100 (NS) 78/100 (PS4) 74/100 (XONE) 69/100 (iOS) 85/100

Review scores
Publication	Score
IGN	8/10
Push Square	7/10 (VR)

CastleStorm received "generally favorable" reviews, while CastleStorm: Definitive Edition received "mixed or average" reviews, according to review aggregator Metacritic. It was praised for physics, visuals, and real-time strategy, but was criticized for a repetitive storyline and pointless missions. IGN favorably compared the title to Angry Birds while criticizing its overly sensitive controls. Push Square commented on the VR version of the game, stating that its overcomplicated nature lent itself well to those who liked multitasking.

== Pinball adaptation ==
As the developer of the Zen Pinball series, Zen Studios also developed its own virtual pinball adaptation of CastleStorm and released it as part of the Iron and Steel pack for Zen Pinball 2, Pinball FX 2 and Pinball FX 3 in early 2015; with a remastered version released as a single table for Pinball FX on March 31, 2022. This table omits blood from the game due to censorship reasons and features 3-D animated figures of Sir Gareth and various Viking enemies, and is played entirely from Sir Gareth's perspective, with modes focusing on attack or defense against the Vikings, as well as celebrations in between battles.
