= Star Wars Pinball VR =

2021 video game

- Developer: Zen Studios
- Publisher: Zen Studios
- Engine: Unreal Engine 4
- Platforms: Meta Quest; Windows; PlayStation VR
- Release: April 29, 2021
- Genre: Pinball
- Mode: Single-player

Star Wars Pinball VR is a pinball video game released on April 29, 2021. It is the second pinball VR game developed by Zen Studios, following Pinball FX2 VR.

== Gameplay ==
The game uses a "fan cave" to display the pinball tables and earned customizable options: posters, models, helmets, and full-size characters. It includes a cantina jukebox, with John Williams and other music. This jukebox is styled after R2-D2.

The game has classic and arcade modes, with classic mode a standard game of pinball, with arcade mode using passive and active abilities which can be upgraded using shards gained from playing challenges in career mode.

== Development ==
The game was announced on February 26, 2021, with a release date of April 29, 2021. The game released with eight tables, including updated versions from Pinball FX3 of Star Wars: A New Hope, The Empire Strikes Back, Return of the Jedi, Rogue One, Star Wars Rebels, and Masters of the Force. Two new tables were included, Star Wars: Classic Collectibles based on Kenner Star Wars figures, and The Mandalorian based on the first season of The Mandalorian. The Mandalorian table has a full-size figure of the Mandalorian beside it. The table layout includes an elevated playfield based on the Razor Crest, and another area with the IG-11 droid. A series of chapters are based on scenes from The Mandalorian.

A table based on Han Solo released as a free update on May 27, 2021.

A further free update released a table based on Droids on June 24, 2021. The table is set when R2-D2 and C-3PO were captured by Jawas in the desert of Tatooine.

== Reception ==
Reception

Aggregate score
Aggregator	Score
Metacritic	PC: 81%, PS4: 81%

Review scores
Publication	Score
The Games Machine	Quest 2: 8.5/10
Pure PlayStation	PS VR: 8/10

CNET said the version running on the Quest 2 had fluid ball motion, and that standing at the table was convincing, and that game is an affordable way to have virtual pinball tables at home. TechRadar praised the immersion of the game, and enjoyed the mini-games used on some tables. Prima Games found the textures to be lower quality on the Quest 2 than on non-VR platforms. the career mode was praised, but found the menus to be off-putting.

Reviewing the PC VR version, Hardcore Gamer said there is a strong collection of tables which all play differently. Playing in VR was found to be close to real pinball, avoiding the compromise of viewpoints in standard screen versions. UploadVR found the table design to make it an excellent pinball game, and the fan cave to make it an excellent Star Wars experience. The text on information menus was found to be awkward to read.

For the PlayStation VR version, Pure PlayStation praised the sound effects, but found the voice acting to be mostly weak. The physics were found to "feel spot-on".

== Legacy ==
Zen Studios released another VR pinball game in 2025 called Pinball FX VR.
