= The Party Zone =

1991 pinball machine

- front of flyer
- Manufacturer: Midway
- Release date: August 1991
- System: Williams WPC (Dot Matrix)
- Players: 1-4
- Design: Dennis Nordman
- Programming: Jim Strompolis
- Artwork: Greg Freres
- Mechanics: Zaofia Bil, Win Schilling
- Music: Dan Forden
- Sound: Dan Forden
- Production run: 3,862

The Party Zone is a solid-state pinball machine released in 1991 by Midway (under Bally) designed by Dennis Nordman and programmed by Jim Strompolis. It is in a single playfield format and features Captain B. Zarre with characters from previous pinball machines. It is the second pinball machine released after the Bally-Midway division was sold to Williams, but still operated under the "Bally" name.

== Design ==
The music request evolved from the jukebox on Party Animal. The designer decided to reutilize the idea because of the better sound hardware in this machine.

== Heritage ==
The backglass as well as the playfield contain characters from previous games (who all meet up on this game at the Cosmic Cottage):

- The Party Animal from Bally Midway's 1987 Party Animal
- The Party Monsters from Midway's 1989 Elvira and the Party Monsters
- The Party Dude from Midway's 1990 Dr. Dude And His Excellent Ray
- Beside the skeleton in the group of Party Monsters, a Trog caveman, from the 1990 Midway arcade game Trog, can be seen.

== Digital version ==
This game was released by FarSight Studios as a licensed table for The Pinball Arcade in season four, and was delisted on June 30, 2018 due to the loss of the Williams license.

The Party Zone released for Pinball FX3 released on December 4, 2018, and included optional animations. A remastered version released for Pinball FX on March 31, 2022; and a VR version released for Pinball FX VR on May 15, 2025 which included an animated Captain B. Zarre next to the machine. The songs "Come Fly with Me", "Purple Haze", and "Feelings" were excluded due to licensing issues. Only "Pinball Wizard" remained intact.
