= Hurricane (pinball) =

1991 pinball machine

- Manufacturer: Williams
- Release date: August, 1991
- System: Williams WPC (Dot Matrix)
- Design: Barry Oursler
- Programming: Mark Penacho
- Artwork: Python Anghelo, John Youssi
- Music: Paul Heitsch
- Production run: 4,400

Hurricane is a pinball machine released by Williams Electronics in August 1991. It was designed by Barry Oursler as the third game in Oursler's amusement park themed pinball trilogy. The first being Comet, released in 1985, and the second being Cyclone, released in 1988.

== Artwork ==
Two rider's at the front of the rollercoaster on the backglass have T-shirts with "Comet" and "Cyclone" referencing the earlier games.

== Description ==
The game has some new features and many other features that came from its predecessors. New features include the Hurricane ramp which is a ramp that circles the whole playfield and acts as the skill shot when the player shoots the ball up the ramp on the right side of the playfield awarding the player 500,000 and adds up and additional 250,000 each time the skill shot is made successfully. Another new feature is the Juggler in the middle of the playfield that shoots the ball up and then U-turns back down to the Pop bumpers and also acts as the ball lock for multiball. Several other features return from both Comet and Cyclone as well, like the Comet ramp in the middle of the playfield and the Ferris wheel mechanism from Cyclone In which this game has a double Ferris Wheel other than a single one to carry the ball from one ferris wheel to another, then to the ramp and back to the playfield. Other features include the dummy and the shooting gallery targets in form of Cats and Ducks that returned from Comet. Another feature of this game is a rotating backglass that is similar to Cyclone's award wheel with the Hurricane rollercoaster spinning around and choosing the award the player receives on the dot-matrix display.

== Gameplay Rules ==
The primary rules of the game is to complete the PALACE letters, start multiball, and complete the clown face in the middle of the playfield to start Clown Time.

- PALACE-To get the PALACE letters, shoot the hurricane ramp on the right side of the playfield when "Palace Letter" is lit to be awarded one letter at a time. Once you complete PALACE, the Palace Jackpot will light at the juggler awarding you in a range of 5 million to 15 or 16 million.
- Multiball-To start multiball, hit the 3 duck bank targets on the left to lite the lock at the juggler. Once two balls are locked and the third is launched onto the playfield, multiball will begin and you must shoot the Hurricane ramp to score 1 million the first time, 2 million the second, and 5 million the third time. After two of the three balls drain, Multiple Scoring will start and last for 15 seconds.
- Clown Time-To complete the clown face you must shoot for six major shots:
  - 1. Ferris Wheel- Lights left eye
  - 2. Hurricane Ramp - Lights right eye
  - 3. The Dummy - Lights the nose
  - 4. the Ducks - Lights left cheek
  - 5. the Cats - Lights right cheek
  - 6. 300K shot of Comet ramp - Lights the mouth

After you have made these six major shots, Clown Time will light at the Hurricane ramp and you must shoot it to start the mode. Clown time will last for 25 seconds and in the meantime, all targets are worth 50,000 while all of the major shots in the game like both the Comet and the Hurricane Ramp score 500,000 for the first time, 750,000 for the second and 1 million for each major shot for the rest of the mode.

=== Other Rules ===
- Bonus Multiplier- Shoot the dummy to increase the bonus multiplier from 1× to a maximum of 6×. Lights extra ball when flashing (except when five extra balls had been earned, and this happens, a score award is given for each one thereafter).
- Mystery- Shoot the 4 cat bank targets on the right to light the mystery at the juggler. Will award you with Points, Specials, Extra Balls, Palace Letters, Bonus Multipliers, etc. (At some points in the game, it will award you with "Absolutely Nothing" which awards you with no points; This is similar to the "Zilch" award in Cyclone).
- Ferris Wheel - Shoot left loop to collect the Ferris Wheel bonus. This can be increased by either hitting the duck targets or the jet bumpers 15K at a time up to a maximum of 1 million.
- Hurricane Ramp- Shoot for this to be awarded with a skill shot, a PALACE letter, 1 million Points, and start Clown Time. Hit the 4 cat bank targets to relight.
- Comet Ramp- Shoot this ramp to be awarded 100K for the first time, 200K for the second, 300K for the third and unlimited millions once you shoot for it multiple times after the fourth time.

== Reception ==
Play Meter criticized the game for borrowing too much from Comet and Cyclone, although praised the display programming.

== Digital versions ==
Hurricane was released as a licensed table for The Pinball Arcade in February 2016 and removed from all digital stores on June 30, 2018, when the license with WMS expired.

Less than a year after the table was delisted from stores, Zen Studios announced that they would bring back a digital version of Hurricane. It was released as part of volume 4 of Williams pinball table conversions for Pinball FX 3 on May 28, 2019; with a remastered version released for Pinball FX on May 26, 2022.
