= Pinball FX 3 =

2017 video game

Pinball FX Classic
- Steam header key art under the original Pinball FX 3 title
- Developer: Zen Studios
- Publisher: Zen Studios
- Series: Pinball FX
- Platforms: Windows, PlayStation 4, Xbox One, Nintendo Switch
- Release: Windows, PlayStation 4, Xbox One; WW: September 26, 2017; Nintendo Switch; WW: December 12, 2017
- Genre: Pinball
- Modes: Single-player, multiplayer

Pinball FX Classic (formerly known as Pinball FX 3) (Note: Stylized as Pinball FX3) is a pinball simulator video game developed and published by Zen Studios and is the sequel to Pinball FX 2. It was released for Microsoft Windows, Xbox One, PlayStation 4 in September 2017 and then released for the Nintendo Switch in December 2017. A follow-up called Pinball FX was released in February 16, 2023. The game was renamed from Pinball FX 3 to Pinball FX Classic on some platforms in April 2026.

Fish Tales, with optional animations

== Gameplay ==
Pinball FX Classic allows players to play one of several simulated pinball tables, and includes online scoreboard support for informal competition with other players. The game is aimed to provide a more engaging multiplayer experience than previous titles; the game will provide support for asynchronous competitive multiplayer options, and tournament-style play. There will be shared leaderboards and multiplayer options among platforms, although PlayStation 4 players can only compete with users playing through Steam on Windows due to Sony's initial decision to prohibit cross-platform play between its PlayStation 4 and other consoles.

== Development ==
Zen's prior games have been split across consoles. The Pinball FX games typically have been released on Microsoft platforms, while the Zen Pinball games were released on non-Microsoft platforms. Pinball FX Classic will be the first game in the series to target both Microsoft and non-Microsoft platforms, and Zen intends that any future titles in the series will do so as well. Zen has stated that a "majority" of the previous downloadable content pinball tables that a player has purchased for either Pinball FX 2 or Zen Pinball 2 will be available in Pinball FX Classic at no cost; Zen cited issues with licensing that prevents some tables from being brought to the new version. Zen Studios has affirmed that more than fifty tables will carry over, with only about half a dozen that will not.

Pinball FX Classic launched with three new tables based on movie properties from Universal Pictures that includes E.T. the Extra-Terrestrial, Back to the Future, and Jaws. Additional tables are in development with new intellectual property holders.

A version for the Nintendo Switch was released in December 2017, with one free table and 29 additional tables that can be purchased as DLC at launch. The Switch version takes advantage of the unit's portability; the game can be played in portrait mode and the player can tilt the device to simulate tilting of the pinball table. However, following release, players reported issues with low frame rates and poor graphics on some of the tables; while Zen Studios has said they were working on a patch to fix these as well as make other display improvements, the studio later announced in March 2018 that they had to forgo the patch citing that there was no universal fix as the issue was one done table-by-table; they can optimize tables going forward but could not justify the time and cost to fix the existing ones. Reacting on the negative backlash of this announcement, the studio later reverted on this stance and is now committed to releasing a performance update during summer 2018 that will increase handheld performance to 60fps and will raise docked resolution to 1080p Full HD for all existing tables. The Switch version also omits Zen Studios' Marvel and Star Wars pinball tables, with the latter being made available separately as a single, standalone compilation game exclusive to that platform, titled Star Wars Pinball, in 2019.

In September 2018, Zen Studios announced that it has received the license to recreate several real Bally and Williams tables for the game. This marks the first time in the Pinball FX series that real world tables are recreated in the game. This announcement came a few months after FarSight Studios, the developers of The Pinball Arcade, lost the same license. These tables can be played in two visual modes that otherwise do not impact the game: one based on the more realistic appearance of the actual pinball games, and another that added Pinball FX Classic's simulated elements like animated characters, and unique ball trail colors. However, as to retain the game's overall ESRB Everyone 10+ rating and to avoid the cost and difficulties of re-rating the game, original graphical elements of the pinball tables had to be censored or altered, such as altering innuendo that was present on the Fish Tales backboards. (Note: The Steam version and the standalone Williams Pinball mobile app available on iOS and Android will feature the uncensored, unaltered versions of the tables, the latter which consequently was issued higher content age ratings (17+ on the Apple App Store and the ESRB's Teen rating on the Google Play Store, respectively).) Zen Studios' Mel Kirk said that while these tables had been released in The Pinball Arcade under its E10+ ESRB rating, Zen Studios' internal review believed that there was no way that the tables could have fallen within E10+. Kirk stated that he believed that with The Pinball Arcade, "somehow they flew under the radar and it was not caught". Further, Zen Studios had had past issues with ESRB content ratings with games such as Infinite Minigolf and wanted to exercise caution. The first of these tables were released on October 9, 2018.

=== Post-release ===
In May 2026, Zen Studios delisted the game and all of its DLC from the Microsoft Store due to "technical reasons". On Steam the game was renamed from Pinball FX3 to Pinball FX Classic in April 2026.

== Tables ==
| Table | Pack | Collection |
|---|---|---|
| Sorcerer's Lair | free table^{zp1}^{fx2} | Zen Studios |
| Secrets of the Deep | Core Collection^{fx2} | Zen Studios |
| Biolab | Core Collection^{fx2} | Zen Studios |
| Pasha | Core Collection^{fx2} | Zen Studios |
| Rome | Core Collection^{fx2} | Zen Studios |
| Earth Defense | Sci-Fi Pack^{fx1}^{,}^{zp1} | Zen Studios |
| Mars | Sci-Fi Pack^{zp1} | Zen Studios |
| Paranormal | Sci-Fi Pack^{zp1} | Zen Studios |
| Excalibur | Medieval Pack^{fx1}^{,}^{zp1} | Zen Studios |
| Epic Quest | Medieval Pack^{fx2}^{,}^{zp1} | Zen Studios |
| Shaman | Zen Classics^{zp1} | Zen Studios |
| Tesla | Zen Classics^{zp1} | Zen Studios |
| El Dorado | Zen Classics^{zp1} | Zen Studios |
| V12 | Zen Classics^{zp1} | Zen Studios |
| The Walking Dead | single table^{fx2}^{,}^{zp2} | Zen Studios^{ip} |
| CastleStorm | Iron & Steel Pack^{fx2} | Zen Studios |
| Wild West Rampage | Iron & Steel Pack^{fx2} | Zen Studios |
| Portal | single table^{fx2} | Zen Studios^{ip} |
| Wolverine | Marvel Pinball Original Pack ^{fx2} | Marvel Pinball |
| Spider-Man | Marvel Pinball Original Pack ^{fx2} | Marvel Pinball |
| Iron Man | Marvel Pinball Original Pack ^{fx2} | Marvel Pinball |
| Blade | Marvel Pinball Original Pack ^{fx2} | Marvel Pinball |
| Captain America | Marvel Pinball Legends^{fx2} | Marvel Pinball |
| Fantastic Four | Marvel Pinball Legends^{fx2} | Marvel Pinball |
| Doctor Strange | Marvel Pinball Legends^{fx2} | Marvel Pinball |
| Venom | Marvel Pinball Heavy Hitters^{fx2} | Marvel Pinball |
| Civil War | Marvel Pinball Heavy Hitters^{fx2} | Marvel Pinball |
| Deadpool | Marvel Pinball Heavy Hitters^{fx2} | Marvel Pinball |
| Thor | Marvel Pinball Vengeance & Virtue ^{fx2} | Marvel Pinball |
| Ghost Rider | Marvel Pinball Vengeance & Virtue ^{fx2} | Marvel Pinball |
| Moon Knight | Marvel Pinball Vengeance & Virtue ^{fx2} | Marvel Pinball |
| X-Men | Marvel Pinball Vengeance & Virtue ^{fx2} | Marvel Pinball |
| The Avengers | Marvel Pinball Avengers Chronicles ^{fx2} | Marvel Pinball |
| Fear Itself | Marvel Pinball Avengers Chronicles ^{fx2} | Marvel Pinball |
| The Infinity Gauntlet | Marvel Pinball Avengers Chronicles ^{fx2} | Marvel Pinball |
| World War Hulk | Marvel Pinball Avengers Chronicles ^{fx2} | Marvel Pinball |
| Guardians of the Galaxy | Marvel Pinball Cinematic Pack^{fx2} | Marvel Pinball |
| Marvel's Avengers: Age of Ultron | Marvel Pinball Cinematic Pack^{fx2} | Marvel Pinball |
| Ant-Man | Marvel Pinball Cinematic Pack^{fx2} | Marvel Pinball |
| A-Force | Marvel Pinball Women of Power ^{fx2} | Marvel Pinball |
| Champions | Marvel Pinball Women of Power ^{fx2} | Marvel Pinball |
| The Empire Strikes Back | Star Wars Pack^{fx2} | Star Wars Pinball |
| Boba Fett | Star Wars Pack^{fx2} | Star Wars Pinball |
| Star Wars: The Clone Wars | Star Wars Pack^{fx2} | Star Wars Pinball |
| Return of the Jedi | Star Wars Pinball: Balance of the Force ^{fx2} | Star Wars Pinball |
| Darth Vader | Star Wars Pinball: Balance of the Force ^{fx2} | Star Wars Pinball |
| Star Wars: Starfighter Assault | Star Wars Pinball: Balance of the Force ^{fx2} | Star Wars Pinball |
| A New Hope | Star Wars Pinball: Heroes Within ^{fx2} | Star Wars Pinball |
| Han Solo | Star Wars Pinball: Heroes Within ^{fx2} | Star Wars Pinball |
| Star Wars: Droids | Star Wars Pinball: Heroes Within ^{fx2} | Star Wars Pinball |
| Star Wars: Masters of the Force | Star Wars Pinball: Heroes Within ^{fx2} | Star Wars Pinball |
| Star Wars: Rebels | Star Wars Pinball: Unsung Heroes^{fx2} | Star Wars Pinball |
| Rogue One | Star Wars Pinball: Unsung Heroes^{fx2} | Star Wars Pinball |
| Star Wars: The Force Awakens | Star Wars Pinball: The Force Awakens ^{fx2} | Star Wars Pinball |
| Might of The First Order | Star Wars Pinball: The Force Awakens ^{fx2} | Star Wars Pinball |
| Family Guy | Balls of Glory^{fx2}^{*} | Fox Pinball |
| Bob's Burgers | Balls of Glory^{fx2}^{*} | Fox Pinball |
| American Dad! | Balls of Glory^{fx2}^{*} | Fox Pinball |
| Archer | Balls of Glory^{fx2}^{*} | Fox Pinball |
| Aliens | Aliens vs. Pinball^{fx2} | Fox Pinball |
| Alien: Isolation | Aliens vs. Pinball^{fx2} | Fox Pinball |
| Alien vs. Predator | Aliens vs. Pinball^{fx2} | Fox Pinball |
| DOOM | Bethesda Pinball^{fx2} | Bethesda Pinball |
| Fallout | Bethesda Pinball^{fx2} | Bethesda Pinball |
| The Elder Scrolls V: Skyrim | Bethesda Pinball^{fx2} | Bethesda Pinball |
| Adventure Land Pinball | Carnivals & Legends Pack | Zen Studios |
| Son of Zeus | Carnivals & Legends Pack | Zen Studios |
| E.T. the Extra-Terrestrial | Universal Classics | Universal Pinball |
| Back to the Future | Universal Classics | Universal Pinball |
| Jaws | Universal Classics | Universal Pinball |
| Jurassic World | Jurassic World | Universal Pinball |
| Jurassic Park | Jurassic World | Universal Pinball |
| Jurassic Park Pinball Mayhem | Jurassic World | Universal Pinball |
| Star Wars: The Last Jedi | Star Wars Pinball: The Last Jedi | Star Wars Pinball |
| Star Wars: Ahch-To Island | Star Wars Pinball: The Last Jedi | Star Wars Pinball |
| Solo: A Star Wars Story | Star Wars Pinball: Solo Pack | Star Wars Pinball |
| Calrissian Chronicles | Star Wars Pinball: Solo Pack | Star Wars Pinball |
| Star Wars: Battle of Mimban | Star Wars Pinball: Solo Pack | Star Wars Pinball |
| Fish Tales | free table | Williams Pinball |
| The Getaway: High Speed II | Volume 1 | Williams Pinball |
| Junk Yard | Volume 1 | Williams Pinball |
| Medieval Madness | Volume 1 | Williams Pinball |
| The Party Zone | Volume 2 | Williams Pinball |
| Black Rose | Volume 2 | Williams Pinball |
| Attack from Mars | Volume 2 | Williams Pinball |
| Theatre of Magic | Volume 3 | Williams Pinball |
| The Champion Pub | Volume 3 | Williams Pinball |
| Safe Cracker | Volume 3 | Williams Pinball |
| White Water | Volume 4 | Williams Pinball |
| Hurricane | Volume 4 | Williams Pinball |
| Red & Ted's Road Show | Volume 4 | Williams Pinball |
| Tales of the Arabian Nights | Volume 5 | Williams Pinball |
| Cirqus Voltaire | Volume 5 | Williams Pinball |
| No Good Gofers | Volume 5 | Williams Pinball |
| FunHouse | Volume 6 | Williams Pinball |
| Space Station | Volume 6 | Williams Pinball |
| Dr. Dude and His Excellent Ray | Volume 6 | Williams Pinball |
| Indiana Jones: The Pinball Adventure | single table | Williams Pinball |
| Creature from the Black Lagoon | Universal Monsters Pack | Williams Pinball |
| Monster Bash | Universal Monsters Pack | Williams Pinball |

^fx1Table originally from Pinball FX
^fx2Table originally from Pinball FX 2
^zp1Table originally from or was also released on Zen Pinball
^zp2Table also released for Zen Pinball 2
^ipNon-Disney-owned IP(s) licensed to Zen Studios
^*The Balls of Glory pack was delisted on August 28, 2024.

== Accolades ==
The game was nominated for the Central Park Children's Zoo Award for Best Kids Game at the New York Game Awards 2018, and won the award for "Game, Special Class" at the National Academy of Video Game Trade Reviewers Awards.
