= Dr. Dude and His Excellent Ray =

1990 pinball machine

- Manufacturer: Midway Games
- Release date: August 1990
- System: Williams System 11C
- Design: Dennis Nordman
- Programming: Bill Pfutzenreuter
- Artwork: Greg Freres
- Music: Chris Granner
- Sound: Jon Hey
- Production run: 3,983 (approximate)

Dr. Dude and His Excellent Ray is a pinball machine designed by Dennis Nordman and released in 1990 by Midway (under the Bally label). The theme of the game revolves around gaining coolness.

== Design ==
Initially conceived before Elvira and the Party Monsters, the character name Dr. Dude was intended as a pun on Dr. Doom.

The first part of the machine to be designed was the mixmaster where "kinetic energy of the ball is used to create new motion".

The backglass art consists of comic book style panels with lenticular decals which shows both a nerd and a hip doctor. The artist was influenced by Mad magazine, and The Nutty Professor, with the storyline loosely based on The Nutty Professor from the perspective of a young person. In an early backglass sketch the game was called "Dr. Dude and His "Hip"notic Ray".

George Petro and Ed Boon recorded the voices for the Gift of Gab rap.

== Gameplay ==
The ultimate goal of the game is to become a cool Super Dude by visiting the kinetic clinic with the excellent ray as a treatment. To achieve this, the player has at first to collect the ingredients of ultimate hipness to increase the Dude-O-Meter: the Heart of Rock 'n' Roll, a Magnetic Personality, and the Gift of gab.

Further gameplay features include the Excellent Ray to start multiball, Big Shot - a bully figure that insults the player, the Molecular Mixmaster - a spinning disc with a rubber post on it, surrounded by targets and a Gazillion point shot with scoring that potentially can reach multiple millions of points.

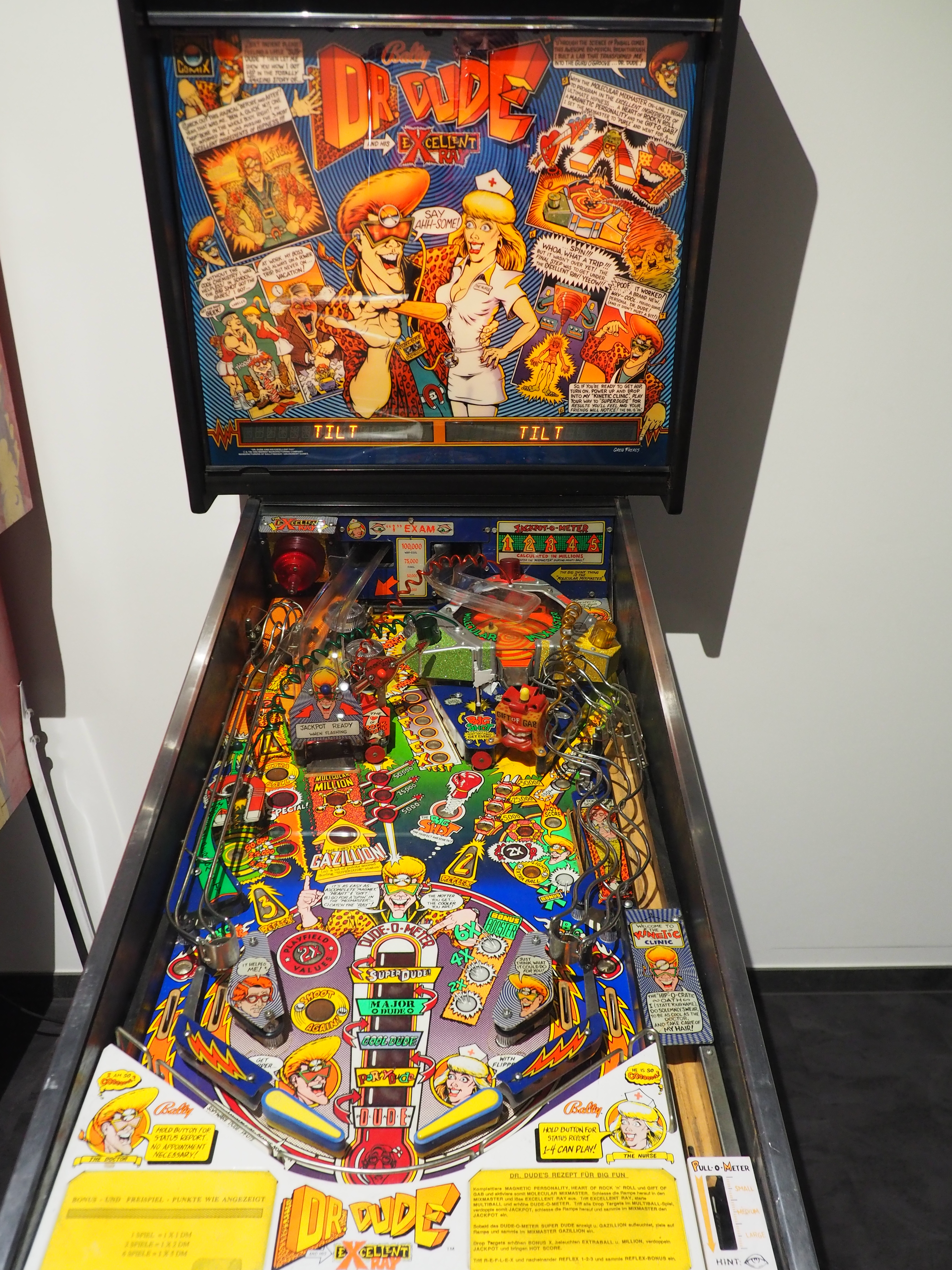

== Reception ==
Play Meter found the game to have attractive comic book style art and a good sound package, rating it 3/5.

The game was reviewed in Video Games & Computer Entertainment who found it a game for everyone.

In 2007, Pinball Wizard praised the playfield, sound effects, and speech.

== Digital versions ==
Dr. Dude and His Excellent Ray released as a licensed table of season 2 of The Pinball Arcade for several platforms, and was available until June 30, 2018, when all Williams tables were removed for purchase due to licensing issues.

Zen Studios released the table for Pinball FX3 in 2020 with optional additional animations; a remastered version released for Pinball FX on June 30, 2022.
