= Comet (pinball) =

1985 pinball machine

- Manufacturer: Williams
- Release date: June 1985
- System: Williams System 9
- Model #: 540
- Design: Barry Oursler
- Programming: Brian Dolatowski, Bill Pfutzenreuter
- Artwork: Python Anghelo
- Voices: Steve Kordek, Barry Oursler
- Production run: 8,100

Comet is a pinball machine released by Williams in June 1985. It was designed by Barry Oursler, and was the first in an amusement park themed pinball trilogy followed by Cyclone in 1988 and Hurricane in 1991.

== Design ==
Barry Oursler was inspired by the Comet roller coaster at Riverview Park in Chicago, and named the game after this ride instead of calling it "Riverview" because nobody outside of Chicago would have recognized the name.

This is the first solid-state pinball machine to feature a million point shot, the audio callout for which is by Steve Kordek, a pinball designer at Williams. Another callout is voiced by Barry Oursler.

The design used for the corkscrew ramp is based on the 1953 Nine Sisters Williams machine.

The game was aimed at a wider demographic of players than some other Williams games at the time.

=== Artwork ===
The skyline of Chicago is shown on the backglass. The cabinet of the machine shows several rides, including a rollercoaster, and the later constructed Sears Tower and the John Hancock building.

The font of the word "Comet" at the entrance to the central ramp, and the name on the coindoor uses the same font as the tickets for the original ride.

Most of the playfield is shown from an overhead viewpoint, with many figures drawn by Python Anghelo. Anghelo claimed to have traveled on a rollercoaster with the front seats turned backwards to capture the expressions shown on the riders on the backglass. At the back of the coaster is John Belushi.

The 1-9-8-6 rollovers were labelled to suggest Halley's Comet. The playfield includes hidden references to Williams vice president Joseph Dillon, pictured as "Dare Dillon", Barry Oursler in "Barry's Game Gallery", and head of engineering, Ken Fedesna, in "Ken's Vending".

== Layout and gameplay ==
The player attempts to navigate throughout a representation of a Carnival, with the namesake Comet a central ramp featuring a roller coaster. Two banks of Shooting Gallery targets (Rabbits and Ducks) can be targeted to score points and advance the matching bonus counter. Hitting all four targets in a target bank lights an additional objective, which allows the player to collect the matching bonus during play by completing the Whirlwind ramp (for Ducks) or the Funhouse saucer (for Rabbits). Completing both target banks lights additional points for the center ramp, including the chance for extra balls and replays depending on specific game settings.

Comet includes a "Motorcycle Jump" ramp on the upper-right side of the playfield. This features a Skee ball-like scoring setup, where the closest target is worth 20,000, the middle target is worth 50,000, and the furthest target is worth 200,000. Completing the ramp advances both bonuses. The ramp starts each ball in a lit state, then becomes unlit after being scored.

Comet features an unconventional lower playfield arrangement. On the right side, there is no inlane and on the left side, the inlane and outlane are inverted. What would normally be an inlane on a conventional pinball machine instead causes the ball to drain.

Next to the central Comet ramp is a drop target that reveals the Dunk The Dummy target. Once the drop target is hit, the dummy will taunt the player using voice sounds (Hey Turkey!, Hit me, Turkey!). Hitting the Dunk The Dummy target will increase the bonus multiplier by one step (2x, 3x, 5x).

At the top of the playfield is a set of four rollover targets that spell out 1-9-8-6. Completing these four targets will activate a playfield point multiplier for a limited time. This is a 2x multiplier by default, but is 3x on the second ball, and 5x on the final ball (i.e. "2x, 3x, 5x" in three-ball play, and "2x, 3x, 2x, 2x, 5x" in five-ball play). The player can cycle these targets towards the right by activating the right flipper, using the Lane Change feature.

If the 5x playfield multiplier is lit at the same time as the Motorcycle Jump ramp is lit, a voice will announce "One Million!" and additional playfield lights will highlight the Motorcycle Jump ramp. Completing the longest jump at this time will award one million points (200,000 times 5x). Comet was the first solid-state machine to feature a one-million-point shot.

== Reception ==
Comet was commercially successful, selling over 8,000 machines, which continued with the following game, High Speed.

Pinball Player found the sound effects to be good, but the speech to be limited with the voice of the dummy annoying. The game was said to be feature rich, with some difficult timed shots.

== Digital versions ==
Comet released for Pinball FX on April 30, 2026. This was the first official digital recreation of the machine.

== See also ==
- FunHouse - another pinball machine by Williams released in 1990 featuring an amusement park theme
