= Marvel Pinball =

2010 video game

- Developer: Zen Studios
- Publishers: Microsoft Studios; Sony Computer Entertainment; Zen Studios
- Platforms: Xbox 360 (XBLA); Xbox One (XBLA); PlayStation 3 (PSN); PlayStation 4 (PSN); PlayStation Vita (PSN); Android; Nintendo 3DS iOS; Wii U Microsoft Windows macOS
- Release: Xbox Live Arcade: WW: December 8, 2010; PlayStation Network: NA: December 14, 2010; EU: December 15, 2010; Android^{NA}December 1, 2011; Nintendo 3DS eShop: NA: June 28, 2012; PAL: June 28, 2012; iOS^{NA} December 1, 2011; PlayStation Vita; November 13, 2012; Wii U January 31, 2013; PC; May 10, 2013
- Genre: Pinball
- Modes: Single-player; Multiplayer

Marvel Pinball is a 2010 pinball video game developed by Zen Studios. It features Marvel Comics-themed pinball tables. It is available as a standalone game for the PlayStation 3 via the PlayStation Network, and as downloadable content for Pinball FX 2 on the Xbox 360 via Xbox Live Arcade. Its content on the PlayStation 3 is also playable in Zen Pinball 2. It is the second pinball title for the PlayStation 3, succeeding Zen Pinball. It was released on December 8, 2010, on the Xbox 360 and December 14, 2010, on the PlayStation 3.

The game was positively received by critics. It holds an aggregate score of 87.73% on the Xbox 360 and 82.85% on the PlayStation 3 at GameRankings. Reviewers praised the visual presentation of each table, and commented specifically on the bright colors and animated characters. Most reviewers felt the table design was excellent, however some felt that certain sections of the table felt bare. Critics generally felt that it was an excellent value for the cost. Sales during the month of its release exceeded 47,000 copies on the Xbox 360 and 19,000 on the PlayStation 3.

== Gameplay ==
Marvel Pinball features tables based on Marvel Comics characters.

Marvel Pinball uses the same basic rules as a physical pinball machine, albeit in a virtual environment. As with a traditional pinball machine, the player fires a steel ball onto the playfield using a plunger. Once the ball is in play the player controls the flippers and can nudge the machine to influence the path of the ball. Each of the game's tables become more complex as the game advances, opening new paths and opportunities.

The Xbox 360 version was released as downloadable content for another Zen pinball video game, Pinball FX 2. The PlayStation 3 version of Marvel Pinball has been made available as a stand-alone release, only. While the PlayStation 3 version does not feature split-screen multiplayer, it features the ability to nudge the table by tilting the controller. Both versions feature four pinball tables based on major Marvel Comics characters: Blade, Iron Man, Spider-Man, and Wolverine. Additional tables are available via downloadable content. The official site held a poll to determine which table would be released next based on fan response.

Marvel Pinball tables	Vengeance and Virtue tables	Avengers Chronicles tables	Marvel Legends tables	Heavy Hitters tables	Cinematic tables	Women of Power tables (Note: These tables cannot be purchased separately on any platform.)
Wolverine; Spider-Man; Iron Man; Blade	Ghost Rider; Moon Knight; Thor; X-Men	The Infinity Gauntlet (Note: Based on the comic book limited series of the same title.); World War Hulk; Fear Itself; The Avengers (Note: Based on the Marvel Cinematic Universe film of the same title.)	Fantastic Four; Captain America; Doctor Strange	Civil War; Deadpool; Venom	Guardians of the Galaxy; Avengers: Age of Ultron; Ant-Man	A-Force; Champions

== Development ==
Marvel Pinball was first leaked to the public via the Australian Classification Board website October 20, 2010. It was officially announced on November 15, and released on December 8 on the Xbox 360 and December 14 on the PlayStation 3. It was available as a stand-alone game for the PlayStation 3 via the PlayStation Network, and as downloadable content for Pinball FX 2 on the Xbox 360 via Xbox Live Arcade. It is the second pinball title for the PlayStation 3, succeeding Zen Pinball. As Marvel Comics has granted Zen Studios full license to the Marvel universe, the studio claimed future tables will expand beyond characters to cover events such as the Marvel Civil War and the Dark Siege.

In an interview with Gamesworld Zen Studios hinted that a table centered around Captain America would be downloadable content, along with other content as well. For 2011, Fantastic Four table was made available on May 17 on the PlayStation Network and May 18 on Xbox Live. Captain America table was released on June 28 on PSN and on June 29 for Xbox Live.

Later in July, Zen Studios and Marvel Comics presented Vengeance and Virtue, a four table expansion for Marvel Pinball. The first of the tables, themed around the character Ghost Rider, was revealed at the same time. Zen and Marvel further announced that Marvel Pinball would be coming to additional platforms, for Nintendo 3DS, Wii U, PlayStation Vita, iOS, Android and Microsoft Windows. The second table of the Vengeance and Virtue expansion pack was revealed to be X-Men at the 2011 New York Comic Con. The third table, based on Moon Knight, was revealed in November. The fourth and final table, Thor, was revealed in December, as was the release dates for the expansion, December 13 for PlayStation Network and December 14 for Xbox Live Arcade. A Hulk themed table was confirmed to be in development by a Zen Studios representative in the Zen Studios forums.

In 2012, a new four-pack entitled Avengers Chronicles was revealed. The pack included tables based on The Infinity Gauntlet, World War Hulk, Fear Itself, and The Avengers and was released on June 19. Additionally, tables centered on the Marvel Civil War and Doctor Strange were unveiled. The Civil War table was released on November 20. The Doctor Strange table was released on December 17, 2013.

== Reception ==
Marvel Pinball

Aggregate scores
Aggregator	Score
GameRankings	87.73% (X360); 82.85% (PS3)
Metacritic	86/100 (X360); 83/100 (PS3)

Review scores
Publication	Score
Game Informer	8.5/10
GamePro	4/5
GamesRadar+	7/10
GameZone	8.5/10
IGN	8.0/10
TeamXbox	9.5/10

Marvel Pinball was released to positive reception among critics. It currently holds an aggregate score of 87.73% at GameRankings on the Xbox 360 and 82.85% on the PlayStation 3. Fellow aggregate website Metacritic reports similar scores, with the Xbox 360 version holding an average of 86/100 and the PlayStation 3 version averaging 83/100. Sales during the month of its release exceeded 47,000 copies on the Xbox 360 and 19,000 on the PlayStation 3. 2011 sales for the initial pack exceeded 91,000 units on Xbox Live Arcade.

Richard Basset of TeamXbox gave Marvel Pinball a 9.5/10, stating of the Xbox Live version that the tables "are a top-notch addition to an awesome game". The reviewer for MS Xbox World also gave the Xbox Live version a 9.5/10, stating that "Marvel Pinball is by far the best pack of tables that Pinball FX2 has to offer and gives something both comic and pinball fans". GameZone's Robert Workman gave it an 8.5/10, stating it was "a simply must buy".

Jim Cook of Gamers Daily News scored the Xbox Live version a slightly lower 8.5/10, saying that Marvel Pinball is "reasonably priced for what you get and its good aspects definitely outweigh the somewhat barren mid-field play on most of these tables". Mike Rose of Strategy Informer gave the Marvel Pinball an 8.5/10. He stated that while he felt all four tables were amazing, he needed "to take all gamers into consideration, and while this is a near-perfect experience for pinball fanatics, plenty of gamers won't find the action as exhilarating". Game Informer's Matt Miller scored it an 8.5/10, lauding its "excellent comic art and highly detailed visual effects make each table pop with energy and color". He did, however, criticize the loss of realism with character interactions to the table: "I also don't always like when onscreen events occur that wouldn't be possible on a real table, [...] the game is at its best when the illusion of true pinball is maintained" he stated.

GamesRadar's Matthew Keast scored it a 7/10. He praised the overall look of each table, but cited visibility issues when Blade's table changes from day to night. Matt Swider of GamePro disagreed, stating that the "odd-man-out choice of Blade amongst the three other Marvel heavyweights proves to be a successful one with its great use of day and night themes". Swider further praised the animated fights between the heroes and villains during gameplay. He did warn users that due to the intricate detail it was "not an ideal game if you own a small TV".
