= Pinball FX 2 =

2010 video game

- Cover art for the original Xbox Live Arcade release
- Developer: Zen Studios
- Publisher: Microsoft Studios
- Series: Pinball FX
- Platforms: Xbox 360 (XBLA), Microsoft Windows, Xbox One
- Release: XBLA; WW: October 27, 2010; Windows 8; WW: October 27, 2012; Xbox One; WW: August 14, 2014
- Genre: Pinball
- Modes: Single-player, multiplayer

Pinball FX 2 (stylized as Pinball FX2) is a pinball video game for Xbox 360, Xbox One, and Microsoft Windows and is the sequel to Pinball FX. It was developed by Zen Studios and published by Microsoft Studios. It was released on October 27, 2010, via the Xbox Live Arcade service. The game includes several new features, such as local multiplayer and the ability to tweak table settings. Players can also import all of the tables from Pinball FX they had previously purchased. The Windows 8 version of Pinball FX 2 was released via the Windows Store on October 27, 2012, two years after the original XBLA release. The game was subsequently released for other Windows versions via Steam on May 10, 2013. Pinball FX 2 was announced for Windows Phone in February 2012. A sequel, Pinball FX 3, was released in September 2017.

== Gameplay ==
The Pasha table as it appears in the Xbox 360 version. Pinball FX 2 is available with either time limited trials of all tables on Xbox platforms and Windows/Steam or full play with video advertisements for non-Star Wars tables on the Windows 8 and Windows 10 versions, with the ability to unlock full tables via downloadable content.

Pinball FX 2 uses the same basic rules as a physical pinball machine, but in a virtual environment. As with a traditional pinball machine, the player fires a steel ball onto the playfield using a plunger. Once the ball is in play the player controls the flippers and can nudge the machine to influence the path of the ball. Each of the game's tables become more complex as the game advances, opening new paths and opportunities.

The game allows use of the Xbox Live Vision camera to operate the flippers and to video chat with Xbox Live opponents. It also features leaderboards and online multiplayer for up to four players. Players can also participate in split-screen multiplayer. Multiplayer games are won by being the first to achieve the set high score, which can be adjusted from 10 to 100 million points. Penalties can also be set for losing a ball with players losing anywhere from 5 to 25 percent of their score when a ball is lost.

=== Tables ===
Pinball FX 2 is available free of charge and includes tables that can be played with a set time limit (Xbox and Windows/Steam) or fully with video advertisements (Windows 8 and Windows 10). Players can choose to download an expansion pack dubbed Pinball FX 2 Core which unlocks four tables: BioLab, Pasha, Rome, and Secrets of the Deep. Additional tables can be purchased individually, or via compilations. The first compilation, titled Pinball FX Classic, contains four tables from the original Pinball FX. As the original Pinball FX was delisted from Xbox Live Marketplace, people who purchased Pinball FX receive the Classic collection, as well as other tables they purchased for that title, for free. The second compilation, Marvel Pinball, has four pinball tables based on major Marvel Comics characters: Blade, Iron Man, Spider-Man, and Wolverine. Achievements are based on the table rather than the game, allowing Pinball FX 2 to have a record 2,200 gamerscore and 100 achievements on Xbox Live Arcade. (Note: The number of achievements and gamerscore has since been increased with additional table releases.) Each table can also be tweaked and configured via the game's Operators menu. This allows players to adjust where certain parts of the table are located and how many points unlock special sections and features of the table. On April 20, 2011, the Mars table was released. Themed around the planet of the same name, it is the first new individual table since the release of Pinball FX 2. On August 31, 2011, Pinball FX 2 received its first original individual table with the release of Ms. Splosion Man, a table based on the Xbox Live Arcade platformer of the same name developed by Twisted Pixel Games. From October 26 to November 2, 2011, the full version of the Paranormal table was given away for free as a gift to the game's fans. On September 4, 2012, a table based on the popular PopCap Games title Plants vs. Zombies was released for both Pinball FX 2 and the newly released Zen Pinball 2 for the PlayStation 3 and PlayStation Vita. On December 12, 2012, four tables from Zen Pinball were released for Pinball FX 2, leaving only one PlayStation 3-exclusive table from the original Zen Pinball remaining on that platform. Said last table, a table based on Ninja Gaiden Sigma 2, was finally released on the Xbox One version on December 4, 2014, thus removing all table exclusivity for Zen Pinball.

| Table | Pack | Collection | X360 | X1 | Win 8 | Windows/Steam |
|---|---|---|---|---|---|---|
| Secrets of the Deep | Pinball FX 2 Core | Zen Studios | ✓ | ✓ | ✓ | ✓ |
| Biolab | Pinball FX 2 Core | Zen Studios | ✓ | ✓ | ✓ | ✓ |
| Pasha | Pinball FX 2 Core | Zen Studios | ✓ | ✓ | ✓ | ✓ |
| Rome | Pinball FX 2 Core | Zen Studios | ✓ | ✓ | ✓ | ✓ |
| Speed Machine | Pinball FX Classics^{fx1} | Zen Studios | ✓ | ✗ | ✗ | ✗ |
| Extreme | Pinball FX Classics^{fx1} | Zen Studios | ✓ | ✗ | ✗ | ✗ |
| Agents | Pinball FX Classics^{fx1} | Zen Studios | ✓ | ✗ | ✗ | ✗ |
| Buccaneer | Pinball FX Classics^{fx1} | Zen Studios | ✓ | ✗ | ✗ | ✗ |
| Nightmare Mansion | N/A^{fx1} | Zen Studios | ✓ | ✗ | ✗ | ✗ |
| Rocky and Bullwinkle | N/A^{fx1} | Zen Studios^{ip} | ✓ | ✗ | ✗ | ✗ |
| Street Fighter II′ Turbo Tribute | N/A^{fx1}^{,}^{zp1} | Zen Studios^{ip} | ✓ | ✓ | ✗ | ✗ |
| Earth Defense | N/A^{fx1}^{,}^{zp1} | Zen Studios | ✓ | ✓ | ✓ | ✓ |
| Excalibur | N/A^{fx1}^{,}^{zp1} | Zen Studios | ✓ | ✓ | ✓ | ✓ |
| Mars | N/A^{zp1} | Zen Studios | ✓ | ✓ | ✓ ^{fi} | ✓ |
| Sorcerer's Lair | N/A^{zp1} | Zen Studios | ✓ | ✓ | ✓ | ✓ ^{fp} |
| Paranormal | N/A^{zp1} | Zen Studios | ✓ ^{ft} | ✓ | ✗ | ✓ |
| Epic Quest | N/A^{zp1} | Zen Studios | ✓ | ✓ | ✓ | ✓ |
| Ms. Splosion Man | N/A | Zen Studios^{ip} | ✓ | ✗ | ✗ | ✓ |
| Plants vs. Zombies | N/A^{zp2} | Zen Studios^{ip} | ✓ | ✓ | ✗ | ✓ |
| Shaman | Zen Classics^{zp1} | Zen Studios | ✓ | ✓ | ✓ | ✓ |
| Tesla | Zen Classics^{zp1} | Zen Studios | ✓ | ✓ | ✓ | ✓ |
| El Dorado | Zen Classics^{zp1} | Zen Studios | ✓ | ✓ | ✓ | ✓ |
| V12 | Zen Classics^{zp1} | Zen Studios | ✓ | ✓ | ✓ | ✓ |
| Super League Football | N/A^{slf}^{,}^{zp2} | Zen Studios^{ip} | ✓ | ✗ | ✗ | ✓ |
| The Walking Dead | N/A^{zp2} | Zen Studios^{ip} | ✓ | ✓ | ✗ | ✓ |
| South Park: Super Sweet Pinball | South Park Pinball^{zp2} | Zen Studios^{ip} | ✓ | ✓ | ✗ | ✓ |
| South Park: Butters' Very Own Pinball | South Park Pinball^{zp2} | Zen Studios^{ip} | ✓ | ✓ | ✗ | ✓ |
| CastleStorm | Iron & Steel | Zen Studios | ✓ | ✓ | ✓ | ✓ |
| Wild West Rampage | Iron & Steel | Zen Studios | ✓ | ✓ | ✓ | ✓ |
| Portal | N/A | Zen Studios^{ip} | ✓ | ✓ | ✓ | ✓ |
| Ninja Gaiden Sigma 2 | N/A^{zp1} | Zen Studios^{ip} | ✗ | ✓ | ✗ | ✗ |
| Wolverine | Marvel Pinball Original | Marvel Pinball | ✓ | ✓ | ✓ ^{it} | ✓ |
| Spider-Man | Marvel Pinball Original | Marvel Pinball | ✓ | ✓ | ✓ ^{it} | ✓ |
| Iron Man | Marvel Pinball Original | Marvel Pinball | ✓ | ✓ | ✓ ^{it} | ✓ |
| Blade | Marvel Pinball Original | Marvel Pinball | ✓ | ✓ | ✗ | ✓ |
| Captain America | N/A | Marvel Pinball | ✓ | ✓ | ✓ | ✓ |
| Fantastic Four | N/A | Marvel Pinball | ✓ | ✓ | ✓ | ✓ |
| Venom | N/A | Marvel Pinball | ✓ | ✓ | ✓ | ✓ |
| Thor | Vengeance and Virtue | Marvel Pinball | ✓ | ✓ | ✓ ^{it} | ✓ |
| Ghost Rider | Vengeance and Virtue | Marvel Pinball | ✓ | ✓ | ✗ | ✓ |
| Moon Knight | Vengeance and Virtue | Marvel Pinball | ✓ | ✓ | ✗ | ✓ |
| X-Men | Vengeance and Virtue | Marvel Pinball | ✓ | ✓ | ✗ | ✓ |
| The Avengers | Avengers Chronicles | Marvel Pinball | ✓ | ✓ | ✓ | ✓ |
| Fear Itself | Avengers Chronicles | Marvel Pinball | ✓ | ✓ | ✓ | ✓ |
| The Infinity Gauntlet | Avengers Chronicles | Marvel Pinball | ✓ | ✓ | ✓ | ✓ |
| World War Hulk | Avengers Chronicles | Marvel Pinball | ✓ | ✓ | ✓ | ✓ |
| Civil War | N/A | Marvel Pinball | ✓ | ✓ | ✓ | ✓ |
| Doctor Strange | N/A | Marvel Pinball | ✓ | ✓ | ✗ | ✓ |
| Deadpool | N/A | Marvel Pinball | ✓ | ✓ | ✗ | ✓ |
| Guardians of the Galaxy | N/A | Marvel Pinball | ✓ | ✓ | ✗ | ✓ |
| Marvel's Avengers: Age of Ultron | N/A | Marvel Pinball | ✓ | ✓ | ✓ | ✓ |
| Ant-Man | N/A | Marvel Pinball | ✓ | ✓ | ✗ | ✓ |
| A-Force | Marvel's Women of Power | Marvel Pinball | ✓ | ✓ | ✓ | ✓ |
| Champions | Marvel's Women of Power | Marvel Pinball | ✓ | ✓ | ✓ | ✓ |
| The Empire Strikes Back | Star Wars Pack | Star Wars Pinball | ✓ | ✓ | ✓ | ✓ |
| Boba Fett | Star Wars Pack | Star Wars Pinball | ✓ | ✓ | ✓ | ✓ |
| Star Wars: The Clone Wars | Star Wars Pack | Star Wars Pinball | ✓ | ✓ | ✓ | ✓ |
| Return of the Jedi | Balance of the Force | Star Wars Pinball | ✓ | ✓ | ✓ | ✓ |
| Darth Vader | Balance of the Force | Star Wars Pinball | ✓ | ✓ | ✓ | ✓ |
| Star Wars: Starfighter Assault | Balance of the Force | Star Wars Pinball | ✓ | ✓ | ✓ | ✓ |
| A New Hope | Heroes Within | Star Wars Pinball | ✓ | ✓ | ✗ | ✓ |
| Han Solo | Heroes Within | Star Wars Pinball | ✓ | ✓ | ✗ | ✓ |
| Star Wars: Droids | Heroes Within | Star Wars Pinball | ✓ | ✓ | ✗ | ✓ |
| Star Wars: Masters of the Force | Heroes Within | Star Wars Pinball | ✓ | ✓ | ✗ | ✓ |
| Star Wars: Rebels | N/A | Star Wars Pinball | ✓ | ✓ | ✓ | ✓ |
| Star Wars: The Force Awakens | The Force Awakens | Star Wars Pinball | ✓ | ✓ | ✓ | ✓ |
| Might of The First Order | The Force Awakens | Star Wars Pinball | ✓ | ✓ | ✓ | ✓ |
| Rogue One | N/A | Star Wars Pinball | ✓ | ✓ | ✓ | ✓ |
| Family Guy | Balls of Glory | Fox Pinball | ✓ | ✓ | ✓ | ✓ |
| Bob's Burgers | Balls of Glory | Fox Pinball | ✓ | ✓ | ✓ | ✓ |
| American Dad! | Balls of Glory | Fox Pinball | ✓ | ✓ | ✓ | ✓ |
| Archer | Balls of Glory | Fox Pinball | ✓ | ✓ | ✓ | ✓ |
| Aliens | Aliens vs. Pinball | Fox Pinball | ✓ | ✓ | ✓ | ✓ |
| Alien: Isolation | Aliens vs. Pinball | Fox Pinball | ✓ | ✓ | ✓ | ✓ |
| Alien vs. Predator | Aliens vs. Pinball | Fox Pinball | ✓ | ✓ | ✓ | ✓ |
| DOOM | Bethesda Pinball | Bethesda Pinball | ✓ | ✓ | ✓ | ✓ |
| Fallout | Bethesda Pinball | Bethesda Pinball | ✓ | ✓ | ✓ | ✓ |
| The Elder Scrolls V: Skyrim | Bethesda Pinball | Bethesda Pinball | ✓ | ✓ | ✓ | ✓ |

^fx1Table originally from Pinball FX
^zp1Table originally from or was also released on Zen Pinball
^zp2Table also released for Zen Pinball 2
^ftFull table was temporarily free to download
^fiFull table was included for free on the initial Windows 8 version
^fpFull table is included for free
^ipNon-Disney-owned IP(s) licensed to Zen Studios
^itTable was released individually on this platform
^slfThis table contains the fictional team "Zen Studios F.C.", but also has the following real licensed teams available: Liverpool F.C., Arsenal F.C., Real Madrid C.F., FC Barcelona, Juventus, A.S. Roma, and A.C. Milan. The physical design of the table is the same throughout, and all aesthetic designs are separate purchases.

== Development and marketing ==
Pinball FX 2's existence was first leaked to the public via the Australian Classification Board website on August 11, 2010. It was officially announced on August 31, 2010. The game was originally slated for release on October 13, 2010, however last minute delays pushed the game back two weeks. It was released for the Xbox 360 via the Xbox Live Arcade Marketplace on October 27, 2010, as part of Microsoft's Game Feast promotion. The development team consisted of roughly 15 individuals, and development lasted 18 months.

Zen Studios Managing Director Zsolt Kigyossy detailed the reasons for focusing primarily on pinball games. "We have guys in the studio who have spent countless hours and pockets full of money at arcades playing pinball." Kigyossy explained that the design process for the tables begins with a conceptual design on paper. Basic 3D models and shapes are then created and implemented into a test environment. The artists then add graphical details and animations. Once gameplay and visual design is complete a final pass is made "properly lighting the table, so the tables becomes lifelike." Simultaneously other designers work on the LED display system, sound and gameplay mechanics. The game then spends two to three months in testing before the table is considered ready for release. The entire process takes approximately six months per table. Kigyossy further stated the team plans to "keep the tables coming, support our games long term, and give fans a great selection to choose from."

The developers stated that they listened to fan responses from the first game and implemented those ideas into the sequel. "We have been listening to our fans and building the pinball game that they envisioned," stated Kigyossy. "It took a little longer than expected, but we have designed a game that unifies the online community, and takes all the social features to the next level." The game was made available free of charge and gives players the ability to try any table for a limited time. Players can then elect to download Pinball FX 2 Core which unlocks full versions of the Pinball FX 2 tables. Owners of the original Pinball FX can import their existing tables, then selectively choose which of the new tables they want to download. Players who do not own Pinball FX can purchase the Pinball FX Classic pack, which contains the three original tables along with the free downloadable table from the original game. Kigyossy hinted that some of the exclusive tables from Zen Pinball would be coming in the future to Pinball FX 2, which was realized when the Mars table was released on April 20, 2011. Zen Studios announced on February 29, 2012, that the game would be available for free along with the Sorcerer's Lair table for Windows 8 users, with the additional tables available as premium downloadable content. It was released on the new OS for download via the Windows Store on October 27, 2012, although the Mars table was provided for free instead.

A port of Pinball FX 2 to Xbox One was announced in March 2014. In July 2014, Zen Studios set a launch date for July 31, 2014 and further announced that the front-end would be free to download and include Sorcerer's Lair, with the game running in 1080p and at 60 frames per second. The announcement also noted that owners of the Xbox 360 edition of the game would have to repurchase Xbox One versions of tables they already owned on Xbox 360. Later that month, however, Zen Studios announced a delay of the release of Pinball FX 2 into August 2014, but added the delay was necessary in order to update the game to permit players to transfer their tables from Xbox 360 to Xbox One at no additional charge. On August 14, 2014, Zen Studios announced that Pinball FX 2 was officially available for Xbox One, including the ability to import tables from the Xbox 360 version. In October 2014, the Windows 8 version of the game was updated with a new pane-based UI and the ability to play all available tables in the game for free with video advertisements playing before each game. (Note: Except for Star Wars Pinball tables, which still require full table purchases to play.) The option to buy full tables were maintained, as buying full tables in the new Windows 8 version removes the adverts and allows access to the tables' operator's menu feature. However, the update was plagued with issues, including some of the tables being (initially) removed post-update and problems of restoring the full ad-free versions of tables if they were purchased pre-update, including the restoration of the then-fully free Mars table.

Pinball FX2 VR, a version of the game that supports virtual reality headset the Oculus Rift, was released on March 28, 2016. The VR-enabled version would initially include three tables (Mars, Secrets of the Deep, and Epic Quest), placing these tables in a virtual beach-side house. This version was renamed Pinball FX Classic VR in April 2026.

== Reception ==
Pinball FX 2

Aggregate scores
| Aggregator | Score |
|---|---|
| GameRankings | 86.13% |
| Metacritic | 88/100 |

Review scores
| Publication | Score |
|---|---|
| Eurogamer | 9/10 |
| Game Informer | 9/10 |
| GameSpot | 8.5/10 |
| Official Xbox Magazine (US) | 8.5/10 |
| TeamXbox | 9.3/10 |

Pinball FX 2 received positive reviews from critics. On the aggregate sites GameRankings and Metacritic, it holds a score of 86.13% and 88/100, respectively. Both sites report a majority review scores of 80% and higher. Sales were high its first week of release, moving over 19,000 units. 2010 sales have exceeded 82,000 units for the Core pack. Individual downloadable table sales have ranged from 47,000 to 97,000 units. Reviewers felt the game was an improvement over its predecessor, Pinball FX. GamesRadar's Matthew Keast stated "You'll forget you're not playing an actual table." Nick Chester of Destructoid added "Zen [Studios] already has pinball on consoles nailed."

Critics praised the game's ability to play updated versions of the tables previously available for Pinball FX. Andrew Reiner of Game Informer expressed satisfaction with the functionality, indicating that the new social scoring mechanics provided incentive to play the tables again in the new engine. Eurogamer's Kristan Reed noted that all of the tables from both games are available for demo play. Several reviewers also praised the upgraded physics, feeling that they were lifelike. Richard Basset of TeamXbox noted that the game's graphics were a vast improvement, noting that tables from Pinball FX also received visual upgrades. Table design itself was also given high marks, with Reed calling them "excellent". GameSpot's Justin Calvert noted the wide variety of tables, but expressed frustration regarding the purchasing of new tables. "It's unfortunate that not all of the tables are available to buy individually" stated Calvert, adding "you have to buy at least one of the four-packs before you have the option to play any of the singles."

The game's updated multiplayer and other new features also received high marks. TeamXbox's Richard Basset praised the addition of split-screen multiplayer, as did GameSpot's Justin Calvert. Calvert also noted the addition of four player, turn-based local multiplayer was a welcome addition. Kristan Reed of Eurogamer noted the new ability to adjust settings on the tables, allowing for enthusiasts to tweak the game to their liking. He also lauded the new social features, calling them the "real genius" of the game. Some reviewers mentioned that while the online multiplayer was impressive they had difficulty finding games to join.

== Sequel ==
A sequel, Pinball FX 3, was released in 2017, which is also the sequel to the non-Microsoft parallel installment, Zen Pinball 2.

== See also ==
- Zen Pinball 2
