= Cyclone (pinball) =

1988 pinball machine

- Manufacturer: Williams
- Release date: February, 1988
- System: Williams System 11B
- Design: Barry Oursler
- Programming: Bill Pfutzenreuter
- Artwork: Python Anghelo
- Mechanics: Joe Joos
- Music: Chris Granner
- Production run: 9,408

Cyclone is a pinball machine released by Williams Electronics in 1988. It features an amusement park theme, Coney Island, and was advertised with the slogan "It'll blow you away!". It is unrelated to the 1950s Gottlieb pinball machine of the same name.

== Design ==
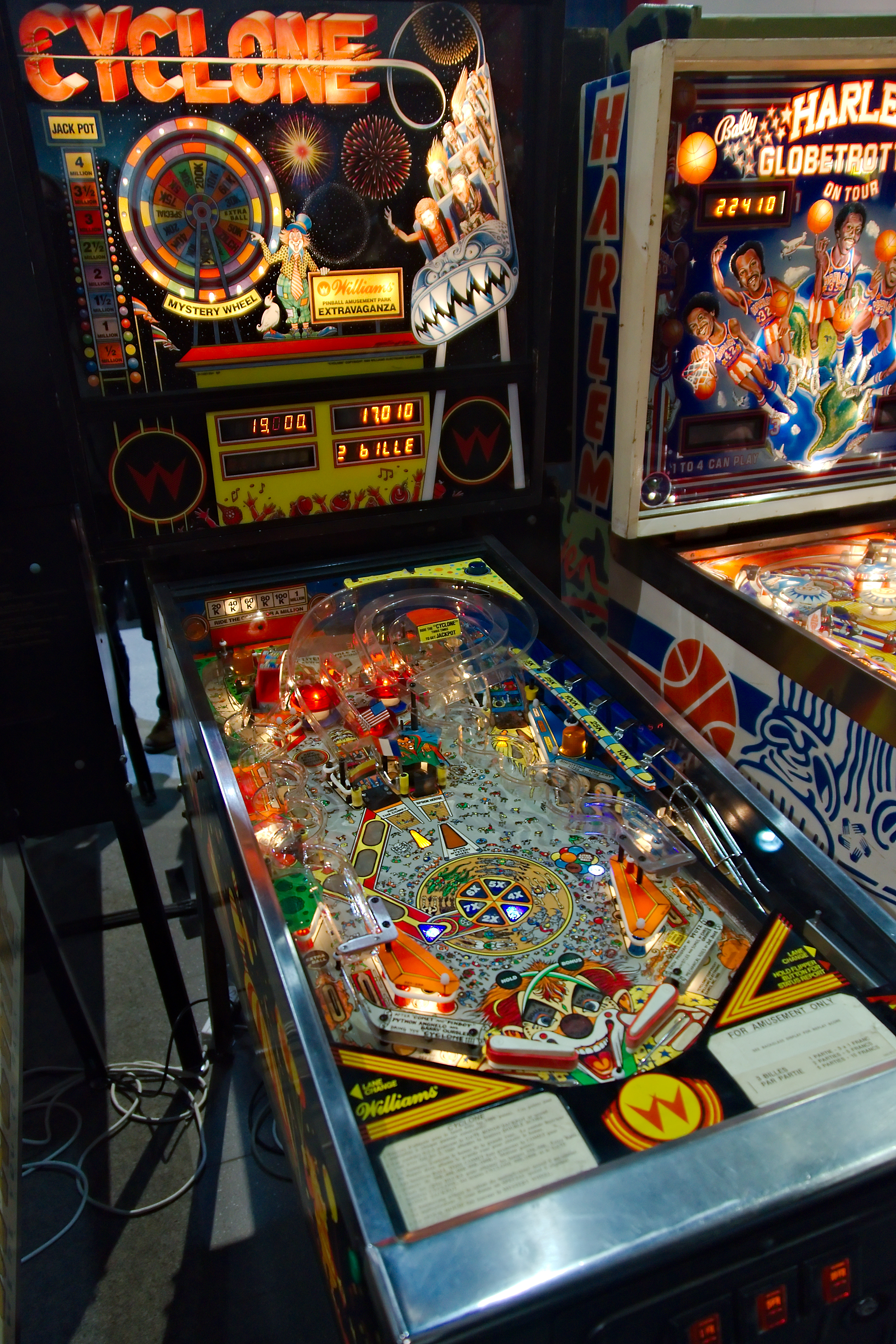
A photo of a Cyclone pinball machine

Cyclone was the second machine from Williams, after Comet, depicting an amusement park. The final game in the amusement park themed trilogy was Hurricane in 1991. The game is the first Williams pinball machine produced after 1985 which doesn't have multiball.

Ronald Reagan and Nancy Reagan both appear in the backglass shown riding the rollercoaster.

A revolving mystery wheel is placed in the backbox - with rewards ranging from Zilch to 200k added points, Extra Ball, and Special. This wheel was designed by mechanical engineer Joe Joos. A ferris wheel on the playfield sometimes carries the ball for a portion of its rotation.

The playfield features boomerang, comet, spookhouse, and cyclone shots. Images on the moving ferris wheel depicts a young couple kissing as it turns. The art on the side of the backbox features an asian type dragon, and on the side of cabinet a carnival type design.

Some of the voices were recorded by pinball designer Mark Ritchie.

Sound bites from the game were used in the song "Carousel" by the band Mr. Bungle on their self-titled album.

The skillshot mechanism was patent protected.

== Reception ==
Play Meter said it was a worthy follow-up to Comet, and while not the best game from Williams is still a "solid effort".

Pinball Trader found it fun to play with smooth shots, but criticized that the jackpot from the wheel-of-fortune is "way to easy to collect", rating the machine at 7/10.

Cyclone was more popular than Comet.

At the AMOA awards Cyclone won the award for most played pinball game of 1989.

== Digital versions ==
FarSight Studios released Cyclone for The Pinball Arcade in 2015, and it was available until June 30, 2018, when all Williams tables were removed for purchase due to licensing issues.

== See also ==
- Comet - a pinball machine by Williams released in 1985 featuring an amusement park theme
- Funhouse - another pinball machine by Williams released in 1990 featuring an amusement park theme
