= Project Pinball Charity =

Charity that puts pinball machines in children's hospitals/homes in the USA

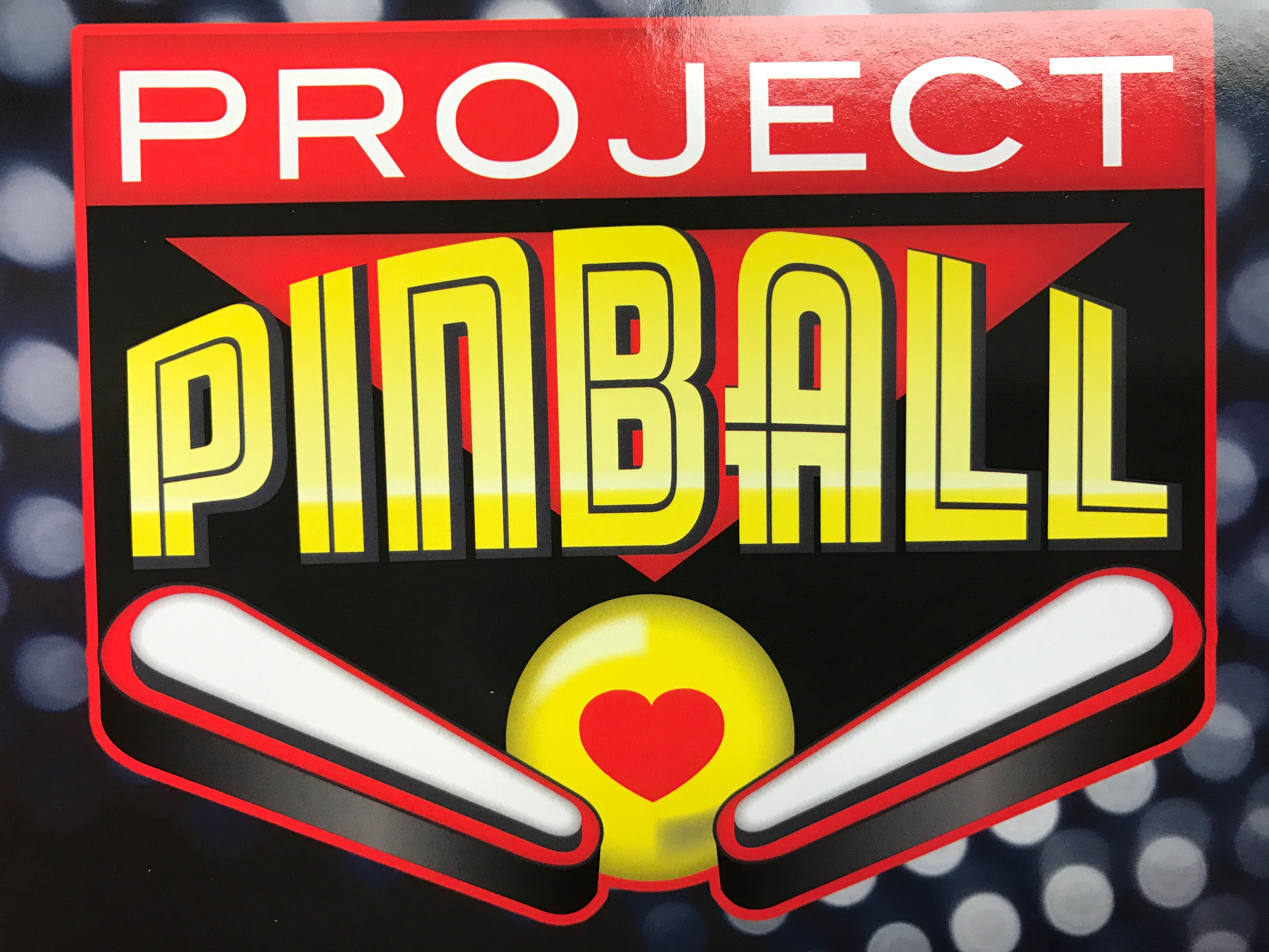
- Formation: 2013
- Type: Nonprofit 501(C)(3)
- Purpose: Patient Rehabilitation
- Headquarters: Venice, FL
- Key people: Daniel Spolar (Founder and Director)
- Website: Official website

Project Pinball Charity is a nonprofit 501(c)(3) that places pinball machines in children's hospitals and Ronald McDonald House Charities to provide recreational relief to patients, family members, and staff. The charity operates out of Bonita Springs, Florida and has been donating the use of machines since 2011.

Along with other charities such as the Pinball Outreach Project, it uses pinball as a therapeutic and recuperative aid.

== History ==
Project Pinball Charity was founded on August 19, 2013 by Daniel Spolar. Spolar noticed an inoperable 2007 Spider-Man Stern pinball machine in Golisano Children's Hospital of Southwest Florida and offered to fix it. After repairing the machine and discovering it had been played over 21,300 times in two years, Spolar went on to found the Project Pinball Charity Group to assist other children's hospitals in their patient rehabilitation. Since then they have been assisted by pinball manufacturers such as Stern, Jersey Jack Pinball, and Visual Pinball to donate use of machines to children’s hospitals. In 2020 the charity's annual Love Across America Tour dedicated 8 machines in 14 days including one in Cincinnati, Ohio and another in Columbia, South Carolina.

All machines are maintained by volunteer technicians, one of these in Chicago worked in quality control at Stern.

One of the table packs released for Pinball FX is used to raise funds for Project Pinball.

Project Pinball Charity has a Platinum rating from Guidestar.

== Hospital donations ==
Project Pinball Charity has donated the use of 82 pinball machines placed in 69 children’s hospitals across 29 states including Children's Hospital Colorado, Sunrise Children's Hospital, Children's Hospital Los Angeles, UNC Children's Hospital, Johns Hopkins Children's Center, Baptist Hospital of Southeast Texas, Nationwide Children's Hospital, Children's Hospital and Medical Center of Omaha, UCSF Benioff Children's Hospital San Francisco, MassGeneral Hospital for Children, Advocate Children's Hospital, Palm Beach Children's Hospital, K.Hovnanian Children's Hospital, St. Louis Children's Hospital, Wesley Children's Hospital and Golisano Children's Hospital of Southwest Florida.

Electro-mechanical pinball machines that can't meet safety standards for hospital locations are placed in retirement communities.

=== Customizations ===
Many of the pinball machines have shorter than standard legs to make them more accessible to children and people in wheelchairs. Alternative controls were introduced from 2023, including using foot pedals, or a box with 3 buttons (left and right flipper buttons and plunger button) manufactured by Inclusive Gamewerks. One of these Inclusive Gamewerks controllers was used on Iron Man that was previously given by Project Pinball to Children's Hospital Colorado in 2016, with the upgrade funded by the state of Colorado in 2023.
