= Zen Pinball =

2008 video game

- Developer: Zen Studios
- Publisher: Zen Studios
- Platforms: iOS, PlayStation 3, Nintendo 3DS, Android
- Release: Zen Pinball: Rollercoaster (iOS); July 7, 2008; Zen Pinball: Inferno (iOS); October 31, 2008; Zen Pinball; May 14, 2009; Zen Pinball 3D: EU: December 1, 2011; NA: January 12, 2012; Zen Pinball THD (Android); December 1, 2011
- Genre: Pinball
- Modes: Single-player, multiplayer

Zen Pinball is a series of pinball machine video games developed and published by Zen Studios. It was originally released on iOS as two separate applications, each containing one table; Zen Pinball: Rollercoaster, released July 7, 2008, and Zen Pinball: Inferno, released October 31, 2008. Zen Pinball for the PlayStation 3 features four tables, plus an additional six tables as downloadable content. It was released on the PlayStation Network on May 14, 2009. It is the non-Microsoft counterpart to the Pinball FX series on the Xbox 360, and the first pinball game on the PlayStation 3. The game was also released on Android devices as Zen Pinball THD on December 1, 2011, and the Nintendo 3DS as Zen Pinball 3D via the Nintendo eShop on December 1, 2011 in Europe and January 12, 2012 in North America.

The game was well received by critics with an average score of 80.12% at GameRankings and 80/100 at Metacritic. It was the top selling PlayStation Network title in May 2009, was a top 10 seller in June 2009, and was the top selling title again in September 2010. Critics were impressed by the physics in the game, and also gave high marks in regards to the game's visuals. Some reviewers felt that four tables was too little for the game, and seven additional tables were later released for Zen Pinball via downloadable content. The first game is currently delisted from PSN like Pinball FX, with all content being imported to the sequel.

== Gameplay ==
Zen Pinball was the first pinball title available for the PlayStation 3.

Zen Pinball utilizes the same basic rules as a physical pinball machine, albeit in a virtual environment. As with a traditional pinball machine, the player fires a steel ball onto the playfield using a plunger. Once the ball is in play, the player controls the flippers and can nudge the machine to influence the path of the ball. Each of the game's tables become more complex as the game advances, opening new paths and opportunities.

In addition to traditional attempts to reach a high score, the game has specific missions tasked to the player. Both local and online multiplayer are supported, along with leaderboards and tournament competitions. Players will be able to activate a slow motion feature and can save game progress mid-game.

=== Tables ===
At the time of release, the game featured four tables. Seven more tables would later be released as downloadable content. The first table, Street Fighter II Tribute, was released August 20, 2009, and features characters and sounds from the Street Fighter franchise. The Ninja Gaiden Sigma 2 Tribute table was released on January 14, 2010, and features a setting based on Ninja Gaiden Sigma 2. The third table, Earth Defense, was released on March 25, 2010 and features a 1950s sci-fi theme. Excalibur, the fourth table, features a medieval theme focused around King Arthur and his Knights of the Round Table. It was released on April 15, 2010. The fifth table, Mars, was released on July 21, 2010 in Europe and July 27, 2010 in the US. The sixth table, Paranormal was released October 19, 2010. The seventh table, Sorcerer's Lair, was released in April, 2011.

Tables
Earth Defense^{a}^{b}^{c}; El Dorado^{b}; Epic Quest^{a}; Excalibur^{a}^{b}^{c}	Mars^{a}; Ninja Gaiden Sigma 2 Tribute^{a}^{c}; Paranormal^{a}; Shaman^{b}	Sorcerer's Lair^{a}; Street Fighter II Tribute^{a}^{c}; Tesla; V12

^aDownloadable content
^bAlso available on Zen Pinball 3D, the 3DS version of the game.
^cAlso available as DLC for Pinball FX

== Development and marketing ==
Zen Pinball: Rollercoaster and Zen Pinball: Inferno were the first games of the Zen Pinball series, and were exclusive to the iOS platform. Each game contains one table related to its title. Zen Pinball: Rollercoaster was released on July 7, 2008, while Zen Pinball: Inferno was released on October 31, 2008. The PlayStation 3 version, known simply as Zen Pinball was announced on April 15, 2009 and was released almost one month later on May 14, 2009, making the first pinball game on the PlayStation 3. The release is also available as a demo version with features the El Dorado table. Between August 4, 2010 and September 2, 2010, Zen Pinball was released as a free download to PlayStation Plus subscribers. The game was also announced for Android devices, marketed as Zen Pinball THD and the Nintendo 3DS as Zen Pinball 3D via the Nintendo eShop.

== Reception ==
Zen Pinball

Aggregate scores
Aggregator	Score
GameRankings	80.12%
Metacritic	80/100

Review scores
Publication	Score
Destructoid	6.5/10
GamePro	4.25/5
GameSpot	8.5/10
GameZone	7.7/10
IGN	8.1/10

Zen Pinball was well received by critics. It currently averages 80.12% at GameRankings and 80/100 at Metacritic. It was the top selling PlayStation Network title in May 2009, as well as September 2010. It was also a top 10 seller for the month of June 2009. In a preview of the game, Kotaku's Michael McWhertor noted that the game's predecessors may have had an impact on the game. "Thanks to Pinball Hall of Fame: The Williams Collection, Zen Pinball looks very purchasable" he stated.

Critics generally gave high remarks to the game's physics system. Brett Todd of GameSpot called the physics "superb" and "first-rate" and added "the ball rolls, spins, and bounces like it has real weight." Destructoid's Brad Nicholson praised the game's "lifelike pinball physics and [...] multiplayer options." Daemon Hatfield of IGN stated that although no virtual table could perfectly replicate gameplay on a real table, he stated that "Zen Pinball makes up for that with new features that you don't get with the real thing."

The graphics were also praised by reviewers. GameZone's reviewer called the visuals "beautiful" and stated "the pinball machines are very sharp and crisp, and are the absolute closest you can get to playing pinball without actually being at a pinball machine." IGN's Daemon Hatfield agreed. He felt that the individual tables were well detailed and added praise for the dynamic camera angles show during gameplay. Brad Nicholson of Destructoid also gave high marks for table design and visuals. He stated Zen Pinball is "a sweet little title that captures the recognizable Pinball look."

The pinball tables in Zen Pinball received mixed commentary from critics. Some reviewers felt that four tables was too little to be shipped in the game. GamePro's Sean Ely stated "just four tables might seem bare at first" but added that he had "much hope for some DLC in the near future." Destructoid's Brad Nicholson also agreed, stating "With only four tables, all of which can be accessed from the very beginning, Zen Pinball feels a little light on variety." Six additional tables were later released as downloadable content. Nicholson, however, went on to praise solid table design and functionality. Daemon Hatfield of IGN echoed these comments and said the game's tables "are all fun to play, look great, and are hiding all sorts of secrets you'll need to discover if you're going to rack up a high score."

== See also ==
- Zen Pinball 2
