= Paid content =

Internet content only accessible to paying customers

Paid content is content on the Internet – such as text, graphics, video and downloads – which is paid for. Paid content is usually copyrighted.

Some internet content has always historically been paid for — until recently there has been little discussion about paying for scientific, technical and medical (STM) content as well as certain trade information.

== Applications ==
=== News media ===
Printed newspaper circulation has fallen steadily since the advent of the internet – in 2008 in the USA alone newspapers lost $64.5 billion in market value. As newspapers' online readership has increased, the newspaper industry has been forced to re-evaluate their business models in the light of falling advertising revenues. While online editions of newspapers have been extremely popular, advertising rates online are lower than for print media, and revenues from them have not been sufficient to offset the loss of revenue from print.

In 2009, Rupert Murdoch proposed a method of micropayments for online newspaper content. From June 2010, certain News International titles were only available as paid content.

=== Music ===
The music industry has had some success in creating new markets of legal downloading where lower costs and accessibility have led to success, and some suggest there are parallels between the major victims of digitalisation – the music industry and the media.

The MP3 file can often be duplicated, passed on and exchanged – without capacity boundaries or losses suffered by an individual. These features of MP3 files as an example of digital content are one of the main reasons for the huge revenue collapses in the music and media industry since the existence of the Internet. Online games, however, as an example of digital services, is only a right to participate when the purchased input is offered and traded. This right can be traded and passed on, but, contrary to MP3 files, the vendor forfeits the benefit of this right at the moment it is passed on.

=== Video games ===
Since the popularization of digital distribution platforms, it has become particularly common for games to feature paid content. Said content is often unlockable via online microtransactions. The act of payment may provide access to a previously restricted feature or content in the game, or permission to download additional content.

=== Content on mobile services ===
In comparison to content on the traditional internet, content for mobile services has never been free.

== Payment models ==
There is some evidence of opportunity for revenue already – custom publishing is one area proven to be thriving in the online media world. Another is the common payment system implemented in Slovakia and Slovenia by Piano Media. In this model publishers agree to go behind a paywall simultaneously and then start to charge the customer for access to all newspapers and all articles. While not all content is paid, exclusive content is and the model enables publishers who are unable to erect a pay-wall by themselves to start earning revenue outside of advertising from the internet.

The increased accessibility and interactivity of online journalism has also created new opportunity in the guise of crowdsourcing, enabling people to get investigative journalists working on stories that they themselves have suggested and funded.

Some success in new models for paid content is being found in the use of paywalls, especially "soft" paywalls, which blend into freemium models. Newspapers, in particular, have been implementing paywalls in an attempt to increase revenue, which has been diminishing due to a decline in print subscriptions and advertising revenue. The approaches to paywall implementation range. For example, The New York Times experimented with a metered paywall, on which they spent a reported $40 million to code and took 14 months to implement. Other publications have turned to providers to implement a solution for them, such as Weekly World News, which announced in January 2013 that they would be utilizing a pay model.

Use of pay what you want has also proven successful, at least for special promotions.

Pay After Reading (PAR) is a new business model and the principle for paid Internet content. This principle was applied for the first time by Slydoo on their Travel guides generator and means that the end users has access to information available in the database, not public, not free of charge, however, payment for the information occurs only after downloading / reading this information. The main reason for this approach is to overcome the natural block that has any user who should pay for the information / content without the detail knowledge of this information upfront. The author (Radomir Adamek) of this principle assumed that this model will become usual for most applications working with paid content.

== See also ==
- Paywall
- Freemium
- Pay what you want
