= Zen Pinball 2 =

2012 video game

- Developer: Zen Studios
- Publisher: Zen Studios
- Platforms: PlayStation 3, PlayStation Vita, Wii U, PlayStation 4
- Release: PlayStation 3, PlayStation Vita: NA: September 4, 2012; EU: September 5, 2012; Wii U: NA: March 21, 2013; EU: January 31, 2013; PlayStation 4: NA: December 24, 2013; EU: December 18, 2013
- Genre: Pinball
- Modes: Single-player, multiplayer

Zen Pinball 2 is a pinball video game developed and published by Zen Studios for the Wii U, PlayStation 3, PlayStation 4, Android, and PlayStation Vita. The game was announced on April 9, 2012. The first PlayStation versions were released on September 4, 2012 in North America and September 5 in Europe while the Wii U version was released on March 21, 2013 in North America and January 31, 2013 in Europe.

Zen Pinball 2 is an upgrade to the original Zen Pinball 3D. It features a new UI and an upgraded version of the game engine which improves graphics and physics. There is also a new social sharing feature which allows players to post their scores on Facebook.

Although Zen Pinball 2 is fundamentally a free download, users who already own Zen Pinball or Marvel Pinball for the PlayStation 3 are able to use all their downloadable content in the PS versions of Zen Pinball 2, which imports automatically. There were 26 tables at launch (available separately as premium DLC) each of which are available as a free trial (though packs like Marvel Pinball: Vengeance and Virtue will still have to be bought as a whole). Users who purchase a pinball table on one Sony console are able to play it for free on the other.

== Features ==
- Zen Pinball 2 is cross-platform entitled in the PlayStation versions. Any content bought are playable on both PlayStation 3, PlayStation 4 and PlayStation Vita at no extra charge.
- Free trials are available for each table so players can try each table before purchasing.
- Those who already own Zen Pinball or Marvel Pinball content are able to import their purchases into Zen Pinball 2 for free, receiving graphics, physics and social system upgrades at no extra cost.
- Zen Pinball 2 launched with 26 different pinball tables including a mystery table based on one of PopCap's games, later revealed to be Plants vs. Zombies.
- New trophies for all tables.
- New social system with in-game score notifications, challenges, Facebook posting, ProScore (personal performance across all tables) and TeamScore (a combined score ranking players and their friends).
- New rule sheets to help a player better understand the tables, while still providing opportunity for players to discover the secrets of the table on their own.

== Reception ==
The game has a score of 83%, Generally Favorable, on Metacritic.

== Sequel ==
In 2017, Zen Studios released Pinball FX 3, a joint sequel to Zen Pinball 2 and Pinball FX 2 that bridged the divide between Microsoft and non-Microsoft platforms that initially existed between the first two Pinball FX games and the Zen Pinball sub-series, bringing an end to the latter.

== See also ==
- Pinball FX 2
- Zen Pinball
