= Zen Studios =

Hungarian video game developer

Zen Studios Ltd.
- Type: Subsidiary
- Industry: Video games
- Founded: 2003; 23 years ago
- Founder: Zsolt Kigyossy
- Headquarters: Budapest, Hungary
- Key people: Zsolt Kigyossy (CEO)
- Products: Pinball FX; Zen Pinball; Marvel Pinball; CastleStorm
- Number of employees: 71 (2021)
- Parent: Saber Interactive (2020–2024); Embracer Group (2024–present)
- Website: www.zenstudios.com

Zen Studios is a Hungarian video game developer and publisher of interactive entertainment software with headquarters in Budapest, Hungary and offices in the United States. It is known for its game franchises, Pinball FX and Zen Pinball, as well as CastleStorm, a tower defense hybrid which received the Apple Store's Editor's Choice award. The company is considered "synonymous with licensed pinball tables," having produced well over a hundred tables with characters and themes from the Star Wars and Marvel universes, films like Guardians of the Galaxy, TV series like Archer, South Park, Family Guy and Bob's Burgers, and video game franchises such as Plants vs. Zombies, Portal, Street Fighter, and The Walking Dead.

== History ==
Zen Studios was founded in Budapest in 2003 by a team of four people. It started as a technology and work for hire studio, doing game engine development, middleware tools, and ports for other games. The company name is based on the team's belief in Zen as a creed to follow in their work and lives, specifically with employees and fans. By the time PlayStation Network and Xbox Live Arcade arrived, the studio had gained knowledge and experience with console platforms and gaming handhelds. The company CEO Zsolt Kigyossy, a pinball fan, decided to try to make the best pinball simulation video game on the market.

Its first pinball game was Pinball FX, released for Xbox 360 in 2007. It would sell more than 100,000 copies per year until 2010. Because Pinball FX was published by Microsoft, it could not appear on Sony’s PlayStation 3, leading to the development of Zen Pinball for the PS3 in 2008 (and later for iOS, the Wii U, and Android). Zen Pinball was the top-selling PSN game in May and September 2009.

The company made the first of its three departures from pinball when it released The Punisher: No Mercy in 2009. This first-person shooter in the style of the Punisher MAX franchise was released for PlayStation 3. The company embarked on what would become its biggest media franchise cooperation yet when they teamed up with Marvel Comics and released Marvel Pinball in December 2010. The cooperation has resulted in twenty-one different pinball tables based on the Marvel Universe, with more anticipated in the future. Another big franchise used for Zen Studios tables is Lucasfilm's and Disney's Star Wars. In 2012, the company debuted Star Wars Pinball, the first pack to feature officially licensed digital Star Wars pinball tables.

In 2013, Zen Studios released two non-pinball games. The company tackled the tower defense genre with CastleStorm for XBLA, a hybrid of traditional tower defense with real-time physics-based Angry Birds-esque catapult combat and resource management. CastleStorm would go on to become a successful franchise, earning the Editor's Choice award in the US Apple App Store, as well as an Editor's Choice distinction from Google Play. Rhythm-based martial arts game KickBeat debuted on the PlayStation Vita and PlayStation 3. On the pinball side, Zen Studios released Super League Football in 2014, where players competed by siding with their favorite European football clubs and famous players. The game was seen as a modern version of the famous pinball machine World Cup Soccer from 1994. The same year saw the release of a Guardians of the Galaxy table.

The company partnered with Valve in mid-2015 to create digital pinball tables based on Valve's games, most notably the Portal table. That year, Zen Studios' licensed tables included a table based on Telltale Game's The Walking Dead and another one based on the TV show South Park. The new Iron & Steel collection consisted of a table based on CastleStorm and the studio's first wholly original table in three years, Wild West Rampage.

In early 2016, Zen Studios teamed up with Oculus Rift to create pinball tables in virtual reality. Pinball FX2 VR, which features three original table designs from the Zen Studios development team, was released on the Oculus Rift's launch day, March 28, 2016.

In 2017, Zen Studios released Pinball FX 3, a joint sequel to Pinball FX 2 and Zen Pinball 2 that bridged a prior divide between Microsoft and non-Microsoft platforms that existed between the first two Pinball FX games and the Zen Pinball sub-series, encouraging cross-platform play. This sequel features most tables from its two predecessors, as well as new original and licensed tables. A year after FX 3 was released, Zen Studios announced that it has recently acquired the rights to develop digital conversions of real-life Bally and Williams pinball tables, a first for the company. Zen then went on to release digital Williams pinball tables as premium add-on content for FX 3 in waves, as well as a stand-alone free-to-play app on mobile devices that contained a compilation of such tables.

At the 2020 Consumer Electronics Show, Zen Studios announced it was working with Tastemakers LLC, the parent company of Arcade1Up, to create 3/4th scale digital pinball tables, allowing the table to support various digital pinball games from Bally and Williams and others in the future.

In November 2020, Embracer Group announced that it acquired the company through Saber Interactive, which will be the parent company. In March, 2024, Saber was sold to Beacon Interactive, a new company formed by Saber co-founder Matthew Karch. Some of the studios under Saber, including Zen Studios, were not included in the sale, though Saber did retain an option to purchase 4A Games and Zen Studios at a later date. In September, 2024, Embracer Group announced that it would be retaining ownership of both as direct subsidiaries, following Saber Interactive's early payment of their acquisition debt.

== Game design ==
Zen Studios' pinball style has been called "cinematic". In order to capture the mood of a game or franchise, its tables include spoken lines, animations and deep references from movies, TV or animated shows they are based on, weaving those references into the action in a fun and interesting way. Each table is a separately designed game, with distinct layouts and graphical styles. One of the Star Wars-themed tables, for example, "feels inextricable from the universe, its elements combining into something truly evocative," while the Ant-Man-based table "faithfully recreates the aesthetic of the film and makes good use of the notable elements in the table design." In Telltale Games' The Walking Dead: Season One pinball adaptation, the playfield is shaped and surrounded by scale representations of the most memorable set pieces from each of the five episodes in that game.

On the other hand, its tables have been praised for their "realism", which means that they try to create the illusion that "you're at an arcade or in your basement with your eyes peeled to the table in front", and that the ball physics make "predicting angles and opportune flipper timing as natural as possible".

As a company that seeks to deliver a family-friendly pinball experience, Zen Studios designs its tables such that they include no material that would be deemed unsuitable for older children (such as sexual content, graphic violence, profanity and substance abuse). To ensure that all of its pinball titles earn a mid-low rating across all major video game content rating systems, such as the ESRB's Everyone 10+ rating, the developers will even go so far as to incorporate censorship into tables based on media franchises that are aimed at adults (such as Bethesda video games and the Archer animated television series), as well as certain digital conversions of real-life Williams pinball tables. One exception is Pinball M, which includes horror themed boards with graphic violence and profanity, and such is rated M by the ESRB.

== Microtransactions ==
The company's first game, Pinball FX, introduced microtransactions in the world of pinball gaming, since additional tables were available for purchase. At the launches of Pinball FX2 and Zen Pinball 2, pinball tables could be exported for free from the previous games into the sequels. Upon release of the Xbox One and PlayStation 4, Pinball FX2 and Zen Pinball 2 respectively were ported over, and allowed owners of the Xbox 360 and PlayStation 3 versions (via cross-buy) to import their purchased tables onto the new platform when available at no additional cost. Tables are available for purchase either individually or as part of themed packs.

== Games ==
| Year | Title | Platform(s) |
|---|---|---|
| 2007 | Flipper Critters | Nintendo DS |
| 2007 | Pinball FX | Xbox Live Arcade |
| 2008 | Rocky and Bullwinkle | Xbox Live Arcade |
| 2009 | Ghostbusters: The Video Game | Nintendo DS |
| 2009 | The Punisher: No Mercy | PlayStation 3 |
| 2009 | Zen Pinball | PlayStation 3 |
| 2010 | Marvel Pinball | PlayStation 3 |
| 2010 | Pinball FX 2 | Xbox Live Arcade |
| 2010 | Planet Minigolf | PlayStation 3 |
| 2011 | Zen Pinball | Nintendo 3DS |
| 2011 | Zen Pinball 2 | Android, iOS |
| 2012 | 3D Solitaire | Nintendo 3DS |
| 2012 | Marvel Pinball 3D | Nintendo 3DS |
| 2012 | Pinball FX 2 | Microsoft Windows |
| 2012 | Zen Pinball 2 | Macintosh, PlayStation 3, PlayStation Vita |
| 2013 | CastleStorm | Microsoft Windows, PlayStation 3, PlayStation Vita, Wii U, Xbox Live Arcade |
| 2013 | KickBeat | PlayStation 3, PlayStation Vita |
| 2013 | Star Wars Pinball | Nintendo 3DS |
| 2013 | Star Wars Pinball 7 | iOS |
| 2013 | Zen Pinball 2 | PlayStation 4, Wii U |
| 2013 | Zen Pinball HD: Star Wars - Episode V: The Empire Strikes Back | Android, iOS, Macintosh |
| 2013 | Zen Pinball: Moon Knight | Android, iOS, Macintosh |
| 2014 | CastleStorm | Android, iOS |
| 2014 | CastleStorm: Free to Siege | Android, iOS |
| 2014 | CastleStorm: GriffyStorm | iOS |
| 2014 | CastleStorm: KingMaker | iOS |
| 2014 | KickBeat | Microsoft Windows, PlayStation 4, Wii U, Xbox One |
| 2014 | Pinball FX 2 | Xbox One |
| 2014 | The Walking Dead Pinball | Android, iOS, Macintosh, Microsoft Windows, PlayStation 3, PlayStation 4, PlayStation Vita, Wii U, Xbox Live Arcade, Xbox One |
| 2015 | American Dad!: Pinball | Android, iOS |
| 2015 | CastleStorm: GriffyStorm | Android |
| 2015 | CastleStorm: KingMaker | Android |
| 2015 | Pinball FX 2: Mars | Android, iOS |
| 2016 | Pinball FX 2 VR | PlayStation VR |
| 2017 | CastleStorm: Virtual Reality | PlayStation VR |
| 2017 | Infinite Minigolf | Microsoft Windows, Nintendo Switch, PlayStation 4, Xbox One |
| 2017 | Pinball FX 3 (known as Pinball FX Classic from April 2026) | Microsoft Windows, Nintendo Switch, PlayStation 4, Xbox One |
| 2018 | Disco Dodgeball: Remix | Nintendo Switch, PlayStation 4, Xbox One |
| 2018 | Out of Ammo | PlayStation VR |
| 2018 | Pinball FX 2 VR | Oculus Go, Oculus Rift |
| 2018 | Star Wars Pinball 7 | Android |
| 2019 | Dread Nautical | iOS, Macintosh |
| 2019 | Operencia: The Stolen Sun | Microsoft Windows, Xbox One |
| 2019 | Pinball FX 2 VR | Oculus Quest |
| 2019 | Star Wars Pinball | Nintendo Switch |
| 2019 | Williams Pinball | Android, iOS |
| 2020 | CastleStorm II | Microsoft Windows, Nintendo Switch, PlayStation 4, Xbox One |
| 2020 | Dread Nautical | Microsoft Windows, Nintendo Switch, PlayStation 4, Xbox One |
| 2020 | Operencia: The Stolen Sun | Nintendo Switch, PlayStation 4 |
| 2021 | Star Wars Pinball VR | Oculus Quest, Oculus Quest 2, PlayStation VR, Steam VR |
| 2022 | Circus Electrique | Microsoft Windows, Nintendo Switch, PlayStation 4, PlayStation 5, Xbox One, Xbox Series X/S |
| 2023 | Pinball FX | Microsoft Windows, Nintendo Switch, PlayStation 5, Xbox Series X/S |
| 2023 | Pinball FX Midnight (initially released as Pinball M) | Microsoft Windows, Nintendo Switch, PlayStation 4, PlayStation 5, Xbox One, Xbox Series X/S |
| 2024 | Pinball FX Go! (initially released as Zen Pinball World) | Android, iOS |
| 2025 | Pinball FX VR | Meta Quest 2, Meta Quest Pro, Meta Quest 3, Meta Quest 3S |
