= Pinball FX (2023 video game) =

2023 pinball video game

- Developer: Zen Studios
- Publisher: Zen Studios
- Series: Pinball FX
- Engine: Unreal Engine 4
- Platforms: Nintendo Switch; PlayStation 4; PlayStation 5; Windows; Xbox One; Xbox Series X/S
- Release: WW: February 16, 2023
- Genre: Pinball
- Modes: Single-player, multiplayer

Pinball FX is a 2023 pinball video game developed by Zen Studios. It is fourth main release in the Pinball FX series, succeeding the original Pinball FX (2007), Pinball FX 2 (2010), and Pinball FX Classic (2017). It was released on February 16, 2023.

Pinball FX features tables that include recreations of Williams/Bally tables from the 1980s and 1990s, tables based on licenses such as Marvel, Star Wars, and Universal, and original creations. Many tables from previous titles have been remastered and included. Tables featuring content unsuitable for the age rating of Pinball FX are released through Pinball FX Midnight, and versions for virtual and mixed reality headsets including the Meta Quest are released through Pinball FX VR.

Many tables from Pinball FX have been released on AtGames Legends Pinball 4KP cabinets, physical cabinets running digital pinball tables.

The primary mobile release is Pinball FX GO!.

== Gameplay ==
In addition to standard 3-ball games, 1-ball and time challenges return from Pinball FX 3/Classic, with flips and distance challenges new to Pinball FX.

The Nintendo Switch version has its own leaderboards, but leaderboards on all other platforms are unified, a change from 3/Classic.

All tables feature "realistic" physics; while some also include a more forgiving "normal" physics option. All tables released after December 7, 2023, include this "normal" physics option.

Like in 3/Classic, Williams/Bally tables can be played in two visual modes: a classic mode that replicates the realistic appearance of the original pinball machines and an enhanced mode that adds animated elements and effects.

=== Tournaments ===
Zen tournaments, called Events, award season points that unlock collectibles. Each season lasts three months.

Player-created tournaments are listed under the Tournaments section and can be filtered using various criteria. An assigned alphanumeric code can be shared for direct access to a specific tournament. Some third-party tournaments are regularly announced on the official Discord server and subreddit.

Pinball FX PinHall with Fish Tales pinball machine and some collectables

=== PinHall ===
The PinHall is a customizable space where collectibles can be displayed, a concept which was first used a year earlier in Star Wars Pinball VR. Items include small objects for shelves, large statues, carpets, posters, and trophies earned in Grand Tournament events. These collectibles can be obtained from playing the tables, or from questlines; each a series of 10 challenges across 3 tables.

The pinhall is also used as the environment to show tables before they are played, showing off the cabinet art.

== Development ==
The new Pinball FX platform was announced in January 2021, and released on the Epic Games Store in early access on March 31, 2022. Development continued until its full release on February 16, 2023, on Xbox One, Xbox Series X/S, PS4, PS5, and the Epic Games Store. The platform was released later on Steam on April 13, 2023, and on the Nintendo Switch on July 6, 2023, albeit with a limited roster. The Nintendo Switch version also has a hybrid of physics simulations and separate leaderboards.

Zen Studios' earlier pinball games were programmed using an in-house engine called PinFX. Pinball FX was developed using Unreal Engine 4. The game features support for HDR, ray tracing, and upscaling, delivering enhanced visual fidelity compared to prior games in the series. On all versions of Pinball FX, players can enable portrait mode, allowing the game to be displayed vertically rotated for a more authentic pinball machine experience.

The game includes a cabinet mode designed for players with custom-built physical pinball cabinets featuring two or three video screens. On desktop PCs, this mode also allows users to display a custom backglass image on a second monitor.

Individual tables typically require about nine months to develop following the initial licensing agreements. For recreations of Williams/Bally tables, the originals are often sourced from the Budapest pinball museum, with sales from the Charity pack donated to the museum, and Project Pinball.

Remastered and Williams tables use a dot matrix display (DMD) with monochrome animations; most newer tables use a LCD type display which on some tables incorporate video clips.

From April 2026, new tables are no longer released for PlayStation 4 and Xbox One.

== Marketing ==
During development and early access, The Pinball Show was hosted monthly on YouTube by Bobby Marsh and Rose Camara, beginning in January 2021. The show often featured questions and answers with COO Mel Kirk and a "Let’s Ask Akos" segment with Marketing Manager Akos Györkei. Future table hints were often embedded in background details, and the final episode featured a preview of The Addams Family table.

After the release of Pinball FX, The Pinball Show was transitioned to Pinball Bites, a series of shorter announcement videos, hosted by Akos and Linne (Zen's Community Manager). Following Akos's departure in 2024, Linne, now Marketing Manager, was joined by co-host and Community Manager, Balti. The community manager also streams new tables on the official Twitch channel.

Mel Kirk has also given annual interviews on the BlahCade pinball podcast, providing recaps of the year and insights into Zen Studios' plans for Pinball FX and related projects going forward.

== Purchasing ==
The base game is free and includes three fully playable tables, with time-limited trials for sampling others. Additional tables are sold individually, in packs, or in larger bundles/collections as DLC. On Steam, a legacy bundle system offers discounts for players who purchased tables in Pinball FX 3/Classic on Steam and are repurchasing the same titles in Pinball FX. Pinball FX Classic remains available for purchase on all platforms except the Epic Games Store.

As of December 2024, Zen began offering remastered tables on Nintendo Switch at no cost to players who previously owned the Pinball FX Classic versions. Similar approaches may be considered on other platforms, subject to platform holder approval.

During early access, tables were purchased using a ticket system involving in-game currency, which was intended to allow for cross-platform access. However, due to platform limitations and fan feedback, this was abandoned before full release in favour of platform-specific DLC, with free table transfers offered to early access buyers. A subscription model, Pinball Pass, allowed access to many tables for a monthly or yearly fee but was discontinued in 2024 due to limited popularity and lack of cross-platform functionality.

== Pinball FX tables ==
As of April 2026, Pinball FX features 140 tables on Steam and 145 on PlayStation, Xbox, and Epic Games Store. The discrepancy arises because System Shock, Camp Bloodbrook and the Bethesda tables are currently exclusive to Pinball FX Midnight on Steam. The Nintendo Switch has a smaller library, as some remastered tables have not been ported to the platform; however, all tables newly developed for Pinball FX have been released on it.

== Reception ==
Reception

Aggregate scores
Aggregator	Score
Metacritic	XSXS: 74/100 PS5: 70/100
OpenCritic	62%

Review scores
Publication	Score
Game Critics	XSXS: 6.5/10
Gaming Age	XSXS: A
PSUniverse	PS4: 8.5/10
Push Square	PS5: 6/10
Softpedia	PC: 8.5/10

Early feedback during the Pinball FX early access period was mixed, with criticism focusing on performance issues and certain design choices.

Critical reception following full release was more favorable. Game Critics gave it a more reserved score, reflecting ongoing debates about pricing models and content value. Push Square took issue with the high price of the (later removed) pinball pass while appreciating the improvement in remastered tables. PS Universe suggested starting with the unlicensed tables and that while many tables were superb, some other tables were unremarkable. Gaming Age particularly enjoyed the Williams tables, and appreciated the free 24 hour pass to sample tables. In an overview of digital pinball, Pixel Addict described it as "a perfect blend of pinball simulation and arcade video game."

== Other releases ==
=== Pinball FX Midnight ===
Pinball FX Midnight
- Key art under the original Pinball M title
- Developer: Zen Studios
- Publisher: Zen Studios
- Engine: Unreal Engine 4
- Platforms: Nintendo Switch; PlayStation 4; PlayStation 5; Windows; Xbox One; Xbox Series X/S
- Release: November 30, 2023
- Genre: Pinball
- Modes: Single-player, multiplayer

Pinball FX Midnight (titled as Pinball M prior to April 2026) is a version of Pinball FX for tables featuring more mature content than what is allowed for the age rating of the main release. A few Pinball FX Midnight tables have had the gore reduced for a less bloody version and simultaneously released in Pinball FX (with cross-buy between the two platforms on consoles and Epic).

It was released on November 30, 2023, for Steam, Xbox One, Xbox Series X/S, PlayStation 4, PlayStation 5, and the Epic Games Store; with the Nintendo Switch version following on December 28, 2023. Wrath of the Elder Gods: Director's Cut released as a free table for Pinball FX Midnight, all other tables are bought as single table DLC, with an optional bundle for four of the tables. From April 2026, new tables are no longer released for PlayStation 4 and Xbox One.

In addition to 3-ball games and the challenge modes from in Pinball FX, there are further challenge modes, including one with limited lighting, and another to reach ever increasing score targets within a time limit.

Each table has its own play corner with cosmetics that can be unlocked by playing campaign challenges. Tokens are obtained by playing the game which can be used to unlock further cosmetics including alternate table cabinet designs, flippers, ball skins, sounds, and lights. Each table has three achievements.

Pinball FX Midnight play corner of Wrath of the Elder Gods table

The game features three daily limited-attempt challenges; in addition there are player created tournaments similar to those in Pinball FX.

==== Pinball FX Midnight table list ====
Table	License	Release date	Table first released in	Zen Table Designer
Wrath of the Elder Gods: Director's Cut	Zen Studios	November 30, 2023	Pinball FX	Gergely ’Gary’ Vadocz
Dead by Daylight Pinball	Behaviour Interactive	November 30, 2023	Pinball M	Gergely 'Gary' Vadocz
Chucky's Killer Pinball	Universal Pictures	November 30, 2023	Pinball M	Zoltan 'VZ' Vari
Duke Nukem's Big Shot Pinball	Gearbox Entertainment	November 30, 2023	Pinball M	Gergo 'rockger' Ezsias
The Thing	Universal Pictures	November 30, 2023	Pinball M	Daniel 'Dolby' Vigh
System Shock	Nightdive Studios	February 15, 2024	Pinball FX/Pinball M	Zoltan Vari
Texas Chainsaw Massacre Pinball	Legendary Pinball	June 6, 2024	Pinball M	Zoltan 'Hezol' Hegyi
Camp Bloodbrook	Zen Studios	October 24, 2024	Pinball FX/Pinball M	Daniel 'Dolby' Vigh
DOOM	Bethesda	February 12, 2026	Pinball FX2	David "ndever" Szucs
Fallout	Bethesda	February 12, 2026	Pinball FX2	Peter Horvath
The Elder Scrolls V: Skyrim	Bethesda	February 12, 2026	Pinball FX2	Peter "Deep" Grafl
Judge Dredd	Williams	October 22, 2026	Pinball FX/Pinball M/FX VR	
Scared Stiff	Williams	October 22, 2026	Pinball FX	
Elvira and the Party Monsters	Williams	October 22, 2026	Pinball FX	

==== Pinball FX Midnight reception ====
Reception

Aggregate score
Aggregator	Score
Metacritic	PS5: 78/100 PC: 78/100

Review scores
Publication	Score
Eurogamer	PC: 3/5
CG Magazine	PS5: 6/10
Push Square	PS5: 7/10
Digitally Downloaded	PC: 4/5

Push Square rated all five of the launch tables as excellent. Eurogamer appreciated the improved physics, but preferred some of the classic Williams tables such as Attack from Mars.

Digitally Downloaded enjoyed The Thing and Wrath of the Elder Gods, but was critical of the choice of the other three launch tables. CG Magazine praised the audio/visual design, but criticized the DLC system, and lamented that adaptive triggers on the controller were not utilized.

=== Pinball FX VR ===
Pinball FX VR
- Developer: Zen Studios
- Publisher: Zen Studios
- Series: Pinball FX
- Engine: Unreal Engine 5
- Platforms: Meta Quest 2; Meta Quest Pro; Meta Quest 3; Meta Quest 3S
- Release: April 3, 2025
- Genre: Pinball
- Mode: Single-player

Pinball FX VR is a version of Pinball FX for virtual reality headsets. It was announced on February 20, 2025, and released on April 3, 2025. Three tables are included with the initial purchase of the base game, with other tables available as DLC. It is the third VR pinball game released by Zen Studios, after Pinball FX Classic VR (released November 29, 2016, formerly known as Pinball FX 2 VR, also known on some platforms as Pinball VR Classic) and Star Wars Pinball VR (released April 29, 2021).

It is the first digital pinball game to use the mixed reality feature of the Meta Quest which can be used to place pinball tables and other items in the players environment. Alternatively the full VR in-game arcade space can be used with pinball tables in several themed rooms. The game includes a campaign mode, collectibles, and side-games such as darts. Some physical objects can be picked up, such as cassettes for a music player.

The game released for the Steam Frame headset on October 16, 2026.

Pinball FX VR main room

==== Pinball FX VR table list ====
The game launched with 11 tables, with further tables released from May 15, 2025 onward.

==== Pinball FX VR reception ====
Reception

Aggregate score
Aggregator	Score
Metacritic	79/100

Review scores
Publication	Score
The Gamer	4.5/5
UploadVR	3/5

The Gamer gave the game high praise, calling it the most impressive VR game since Half Life: Alyx enjoying the in-game arcade environment, and the mixed reality mode while being impressed at the level of detail of the tables; also seeing the possible future potential of the game as a social space. The use of an X-Arcade controller with flipper buttons on the side "increased the sense of realism tremendously". UploadVR noted that the biggest change from previous games is that you have in-game hands which can be used to perform a variety of functions, but that the lighting effects are toned down from Pinball FX, and that while mixed reality is a solid feature of the game, some elements such as the campaign missions lack depth.

Wired included the game amongst the best games available to play on Meta Quest in 2025, praising the mixed reality mode.

=== AtGames FX Legends 4KP ===
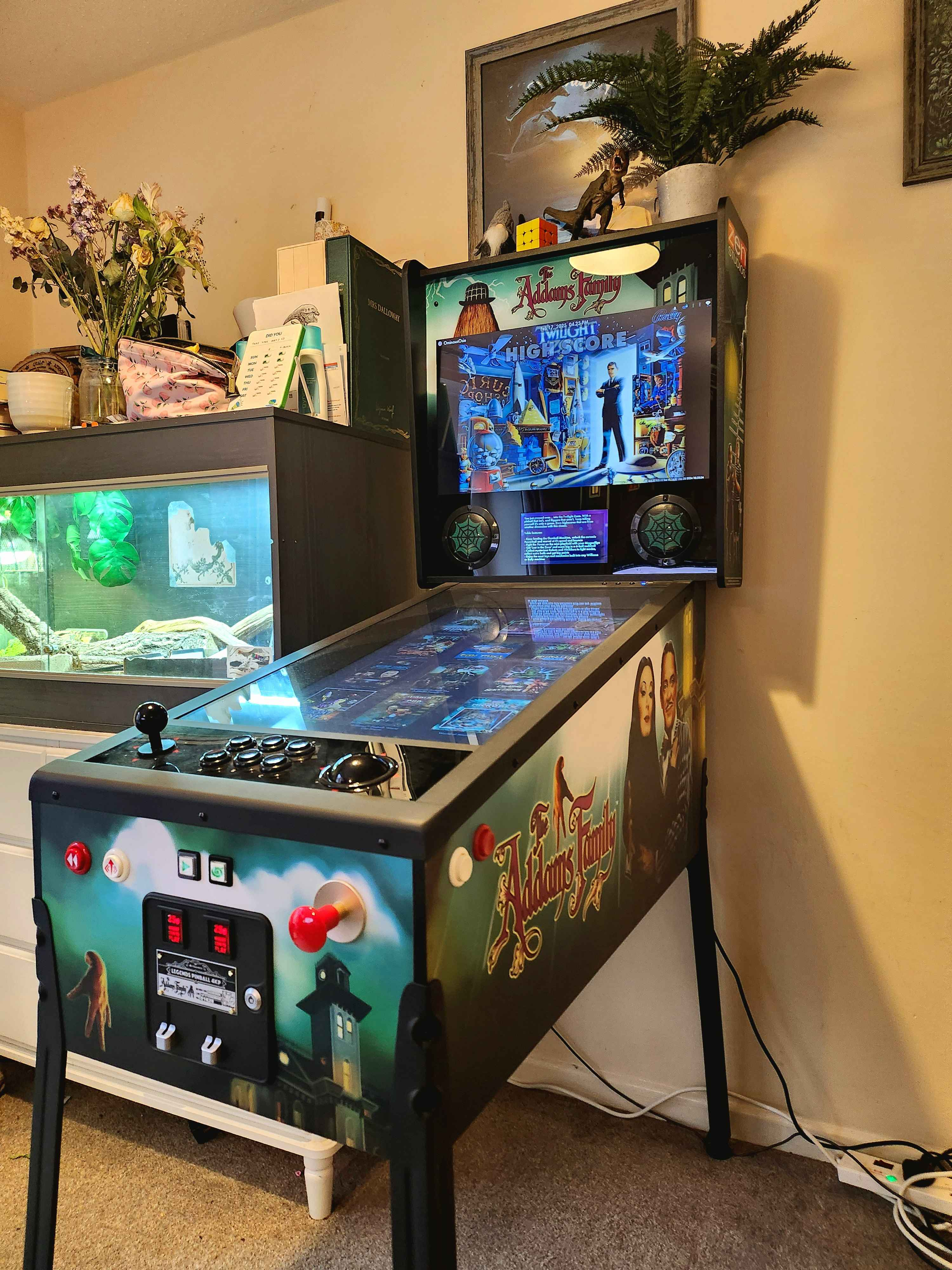
AtGames FX Legends 4KP - The Addams Family

AtGames partnered with Zen Studios to release Pinball FX tables on the range of Legends 4K pinball machines. These are full-sized physical pinball machines with a 32-inch playfield monitor, 23.8-inch backglass monitor, and a dedicated 8-inch DMD. The 4KP versions of the games run on slightly different physics than the PlayStation, Xbox or PC counterparts, behaving more like the Switch versions, running on a Rockchip 3588 CPU. The 4KP features local multiplayer, local leader boards, and online global leader boards for each table. The 4KP features a 3840×2160 (4K UHD) 60HZ playfield monitor, giving the machine its name. This does not mean that all the tables run natively at 4K, with most Zen tables running at 2560×1440. The plunger can be used as a manual plunger, or as a digital plunger button. A "G-sensor" is included to detect physical nudging of the machine.

The AtGames platform also includes recreations of Gottlieb games as featured in The Pinball Arcade, tables from Magic Pixel's Zaccaria Pinball, and AtGames original tables made by Magic Pixel.

Most 4KP tables released in standard and premium versions. The standard edition comes with an additional 14 tables, a light up topper, and the "advanced features" included. The premium version also comes with the surround sound feedback (SSF) kit pre-installed. There is also a basic version of The Addams Family without some of the features on the other models.

The 4KP tables made from third-party licensed Zen tables are based on The Addams Family (with different cabinet design than the physical table), Attack from Mars, Peanuts, Star Trek, and Jurassic Park. Each of these feature the table (or table pack) and themed cabinet design.

One of the advanced features of the 4KP, called OTG (On the Go), allows PC games to be played using the 4KPs monitors and controls.

AtGames also make the Legends Pinball HD, and the Legends Pinball HD Micro machines. These were still in production after the release of the 4KP and still received new table releases, but none of the Zen Studio tables are available on those platforms. All the non-Zen pinball tables released for the Legends Pinball HD and Legends Pinball HD Micro are also released on the 4KP.

A series of virtual tournaments sanctioned by the International Flipper Pinball Association (IFPA) began in 2024, with a full player ranking system starting in 2025.

==== 4KP table list ====
The list features only the 4KP pinball tables that specifically relate to Zen Studios. Other pinball packs are available.

==== Previous Zen partnerships with hardware manufactures ====
Zen previously partnered with the hardware manufacture Arcade1up to produce Zen licensed virtual pinball cabinets. Three different licensed cabinets were manufactured, Star Wars, Marvel and Attack from Mars, each with ten tables based on the Pinball FX 3/Classic versions. These cabinets featured dual LCD screens, a 23.8-inch LCD playfield, and a 7.5-inch LCD dedicated DMD.

The Attack from Mars cabinet featured Attack from Mars, Fish Tales, The Getaway: High Speed II, Junk Yard, Medieval Madness, White Water, Red & Ted's Road Show, Hurricane, Tales of the Arabian Nights, and No Good Gofers.

The Star Wars cabinet featured Boba Fett, A New Hope, Ahch-To Island, Battle of Mimban, Darth Vader, Masters of the Force, Star Wars Rebels, Han Solo, The Force Awakens, and The Empire Strikes Back.

The Marvel cabinet featured Spider-Man, Civil War, Wolverine, X-Men, Thor, Marvel's Women of Power: A-Force, Ghost Rider, Venom, Fantastic Four, and Fear Itself.

=== Related mobile games ===
Pinball FX GO! (known as Zen Pinball World until April 2026), released on December 12, 2024, is the primary mobile platform featuring many tables released in Pinball FX.

Pinball Masters released on February 12, 2024, as a part of Netflix Games. This includes several tables released in Pinball FX, and the first release of Stranger Things pinball.

On Apple Arcade, Zen Pinball Party released on September 3, 2021. This initially included Funko Pinball Party Arena until it was removed in a later update, and the first version of six tables which later released in Pinball FX.
