= Ladder tournament =

Form of tournament for games and sports

A ladder tournament (also known as a ladder competition or pyramid tournament) is a form of tournament for games and sports. Unlike many tournaments, which usually have an element of elimination, ladder competitions can go on indefinitely. In a ladder competition, players are listed as if on the rungs of a ladder. The objective for a player is to reach the highest rung of the ladder.

== Description ==
The competition proceeds via a system of challenges. Any player can challenge a player above them on the ladder. These challenges generally should not or can not be declined. If the lower-placed player wins the match, then the two players swap places on the ladder. If the lower-placed player loses, then they may not challenge the same person again without challenging someone else first. There is a limit as to how many rungs above themselves players may challenge. When first setting up a ladder tournament, the usual practice is to place the more skilled players at the bottom of the ladder, so that they have to play to work their way up.

Ladder competitions suffer from two problems, both resulting from the challenge system. The first is that the ranking at the end of the tournament (or after a sufficiently long time) may not necessarily reflect the actual rank of the players, since it is not guaranteed that enough challenges, or the appropriate challenges, have been made to correctly "sort" the ladder. However, if the balance between number of participants and duration of the competition is defined properly, this usually results in a representative ranking. The second is that some players may make challenges more frequently than others, or are challenged more frequently than others, meaning that not all players may be challenged, and that not all players may play the same number of matches.

== Example ==
An example of a ladder competition is shown below. Note that the 3 images below show exactly the same competition. Each level has its own colour.

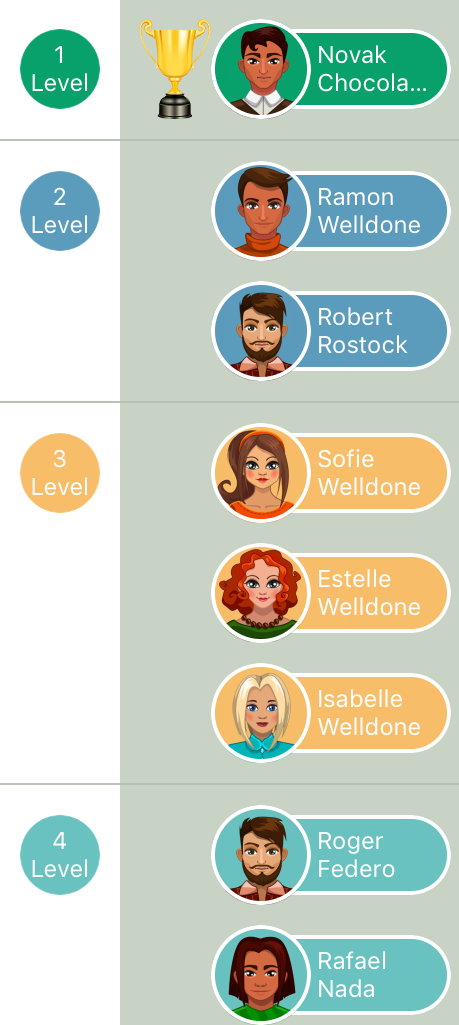
Vertical view

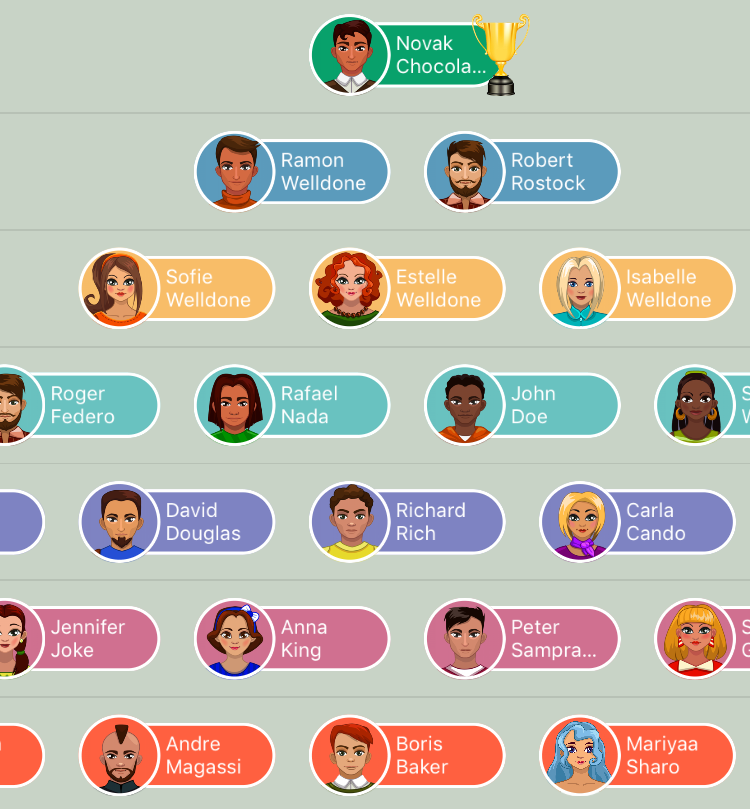
Vertical pyramid view

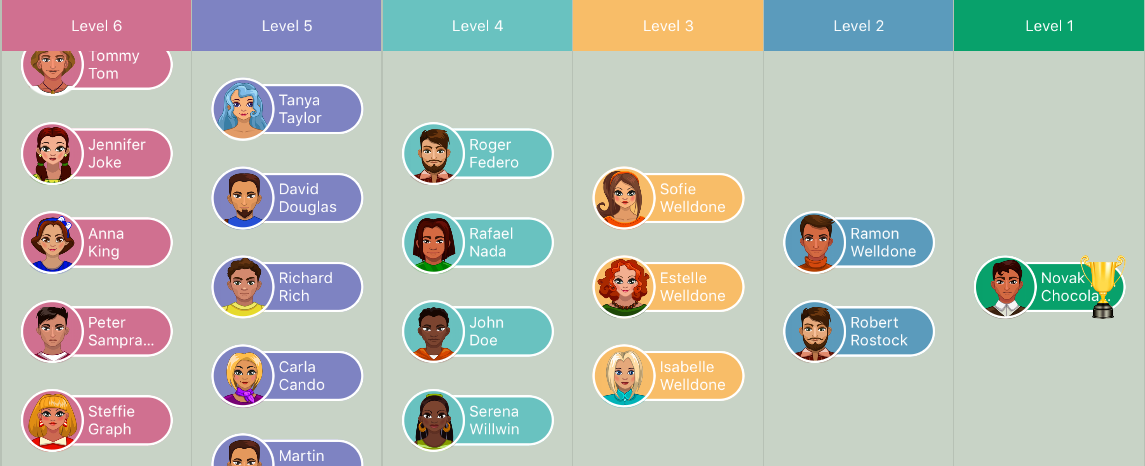
Horizontal pyramid view

Player Rafael is allowed to challenge anyone who is ranked higher than him on his own level, and anyone who is ranked one level higher than he. Thus, Rafael is allowed to challenge the following players : Roger, Isabelle, Estelle and Sofie.

== Uses ==
Ladders are typically used in sports such as squash, badminton & basketball.

Other systems calculate a numeric rank for each player. This removes the limitation on which matches are allowed. The most widely known system of ranking players is the Elo rating system, which is used for Chess and Go. Every player in the Elo rating system receives a rating based on their win–loss record, which establishes their position (or level) on the game ladder. Numerous efforts have been made to design better game ladders by analyzing the statistical correlation between relative ladder levels and a player's expected performance.

A game ladder may be used as the ranking system itself, in lieu of a ranking system like Elo. In this case, players are moved up and down the ladder according to competitive results, dictated by previously determined rules.

A unique game ladder system is the Masterpoints rating system used for contract bridge by the American Contract Bridge League. The Masterpoints system, unlike the Elo rating system, emphasizes participation (i.e., experience in terms of number of games played) over demonstration of skill.

The Ultimate Fighting Championship considers its official rankings (decided by a media pool, based on match results) when matchmaking, though not strictly. Due to the high incidence of training injuries, unranked or low-ranked replacement fighters often compete higher up the ladder than they otherwise would. This is also (more rarely, usually on pay-per-view) done for promotional reasons, when a big name or rivalry makes a low-ranked fighter the more marketable option. Sometimes no similarly-ranked opponents are available, and a fighter may risk losing their spot to a low-ranked one just to stay busy. Winners are interviewed after fights, and all fighters are required to use Twitter. Challenges through these avenues (and others) are encouraged. Though not binding, a publicly agreed fight usually occurs as soon as practical. Rematches are generally disallowed, excepting some championship bouts and others ending in controversial decisions.

The Korea Baseball Organization has the fourth-seeded team play host to the fifth seed, with the winner playing the third seed. The second-seeded team plays the winner of that game, and whoever wins advances to play the top-seeded team in the Korean Series. Similar systems are used in multiple League of Legends leagues' playoffs and regional finals, which are called "King of the hills".
