= List of Stern Pinball machines =

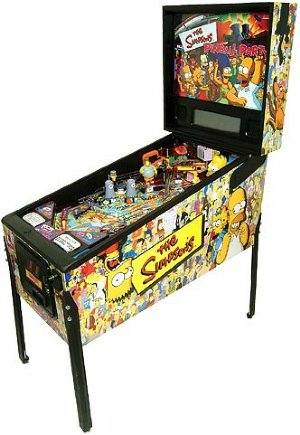
The Simpsons Pinball Party - a Stern Pinball machine from 2003

This is a list of pinball machines produced by Stern Pinball, an American manufacturer based in Elk Grove Village, Illinois, that has produced the games since 1999. There are currently 85 games on this list.

== Legend ==
Status: “Active” denotes games currently in production; “Sold out”, games whose entire planned production run has been sold; “Archive”, games out of production, and “Vault”, a category introduced by Stern in 2024 to indicate games that have been removed from production, will not be produced for at least two years, and may never return to production.

Licensed from: Indicates the company or intellectual property licensed to make the game, or "n/a" if the game is an original Stern theme.

Name	Year released	Lead designer(s)	Licensed from	Status	Ref.
Harley-Davidson	1999	John Borg and Lonnie D. Ropp	Harley-Davidson	Archive	
Striker Xtreme	2000	Joe Balcer	n/a	Archive	
Sharkey's Shootout	2000	John Borg	n/a	Archive	
High Roller Casino	2001	Jon Norris	n/a	Archive	
Austin Powers	2001	John Borg and Lonnie D. Ropp	Austin Powers	Archive	
Monopoly	2001	Pat Lawlor	Monopoly	Archive	
NFL	2001	Joe Balcer	National Football League	Archive	
Playboy	2002	George Gomez and Dwight Sullivan	Playboy	Archive	
RollerCoaster Tycoon	2002	Pat Lawlor	RollerCoaster Tycoon	Archive	
The Simpsons Pinball Party	2003	Joe Balcer and Keith P. Johnson	The Simpsons	Archive	
Terminator 3: Rise of the Machines	2003	Steve Ritchie	Terminator 3: Rise of the Machines	Archive	
The Lord of the Rings	2003	George Gomez	The Lord of the Rings film trilogy	Archive	
Ripley's Believe It or Not!	2004	Pat Lawlor	Ripley's Believe It or Not!	Archive	
Elvis	2004	Steve Ritchie	Elvis Presley	Archive	
The Sopranos	2005	George Gomez	The Sopranos	Archive	
Grand Prix	2005	Pat Lawlor	n/a	Archive	
NASCAR	2005	Pat Lawlor	NASCAR	Archive	
World Poker Tour	2006	Steve Ritchie	World Poker Tour	Archive	
Pirates of the Caribbean	2006	Dennis Nordman	Pirates of the Caribbean	Archive	
Dale Jr.	2007	Pat Lawlor	Dale Earnhardt Jr.	Archive	
Family Guy	2007	Pat Lawlor	Family Guy	Archive	
Spider-Man	2007	Steve Ritchie	Spider-Man	Archive	
Wheel of Fortune	2007	Dennis Nordman	Wheel of Fortune	Archive	
Indiana Jones	2008	John Borg	First four Indiana Jones films	Archive	
Batman (The Dark Knight)	2008	George Gomez	First two films in The Dark Knight Trilogy	Archive	
Shrek	2008	Pat Lawlor	First 3 Shrek films	Archive	
CSI: Crime Scene Investigation	2008	Pat Lawlor	CSI: Crime Scene Investigation	Archive	
24	2008	Steve Ritchie	24	Archive	
NBA	2008	John Borg and Ray Tanzer	National Basketball Association	Archive	
Big Buck Hunter Pro	2009	John Borg	Big Buck Hunter	Archive	
Iron Man	2010	John Borg	First two Iron Man films	Archive	
Avatar	2010	John Borg	Avatar	Archive	
The Rolling Stones	2011	Tom Kopera	The Rolling Stones	Archive	
TRON: Legacy	2011	John Borg	TRON: Legacy	Archive	
Transformers	2011	George Gomez	Transformers	Archive	
AC/DC	2012	Steve Ritchie	AC/DC	Archive	
X-Men	2012	John Borg	X-Men	Archive	
The Avengers	2012	George Gomez	The Avengers	Archive	
Metallica	2013	John Borg	Metallica	Archive	
Star Trek	2013	Steve Ritchie	J.J. Abrams Star Trek films	Archive	
Mustang	2014	John Trudeau	Ford Mustang	Archive	
The Walking Dead	2014	John Borg	The Walking Dead	Archive	
WWE: Wrestlemania	2015	John Trudeau	WWE's Wrestlemania	Archive	
Whoa Nellie: Big Juicy Melons	2015	Dennis Nordman	n/a	Archive	
KISS	2015	John Borg	Kiss	Archive	
Game of Thrones	2015	Steve Ritchie	Game of Thrones	Archive	
Spider-Man Vault Edition	2016	Steve Ritchie	Spider-Man	Archive	
Ghostbusters	2016	John Trudeau	First two Ghostbusters films	Archive	
Batman '66	2016	George Gomez	1966 Batman TV series	Archive	
Aerosmith	2017	John Borg	Aerosmith	Archive	
Star Wars	2017	Steve Ritchie	Star Wars original trilogy	Vault	
Guardians of the Galaxy	2017	John Borg	Guardians of the Galaxy	Archive	
Iron Maiden: Legacy of the Beast	2018	Keith Elwin	Iron Maiden	Vault	
Supreme	2018	George Gomez	Supreme	Archive	
Deadpool	2018	George Gomez	Deadpool	Vault	
The Beatles	2018	Joe Kaminkow	The Beatles	Archive	
Primus	2018	Dennis Nordman	Primus	Archive	
Munsters	2019	John Borg	The Munsters TV series	Archive	
Black Knight: Sword of Rage	2019	Steve Ritchie	Sequel to Black Knight and Black Knight 2000	Archive	
Jurassic Park	2019	Keith Elwin	Jurassic Park	Active	
Elvira's House of Horrors	2019	Dennis Nordman	Elvira's Movie Macabre and sequel to Elvira and the Party Monsters and Scared Stiff	Vault	
Stranger Things	2019	Brian Eddy	Stranger Things	Archive	
Teenage Mutant Ninja Turtles	2020	John Borg	Teenage Mutant Ninja Turtles	Archive	
Heavy Metal	2020	George Gomez	Heavy Metal	Archive	
Avengers: Infinity Quest	2020	Keith Elwin	Avengers	Vault	
Led Zeppelin	2020	Steve Ritchie	Led Zeppelin	Archive	
The Mandalorian	2021	Brian Eddy	The Mandalorian	Vault	
Godzilla	2021	Keith Elwin	Godzilla	Active	
Rush	2022	John Borg	Rush	Vault	
James Bond 007	2022	George Gomez	Sean Connery James Bond films	Active	
James Bond 007 60th Anniversary Limited Edition	2022	Keith Elwin	First 25 years of James Bond films	Sold out	
Foo Fighters	2023	Jack Danger	Foo Fighters	Vault	
Venom	2023	Brian Eddy	Venom	Vault	
Jaws	2024	Keith Elwin	Jaws	Active	
John Wick	2024	Elliot Eismin	John Wick	Vault	
The Uncanny X-Men	2024	Jack Danger	X-Men Days of Future Past	Active	
Metallica Remastered	2024	John Borg	Metallica	Active	
Dungeons & Dragons: The Tyrant's Eye	2025	Brian Eddy	Dungeons & Dragons	Active	
King Kong: Myth of Terror Island	2025	Keith Elwin	King Kong	Active	
Star Wars: Fall of the Empire	2025	John Borg	Star Wars original trilogy	Active	
The Walking Dead Remastered	2025	John Borg	The Walking Dead	Active	
Pokémon	2026	Jack Danger and George Gomez	Pokémon	Active	
Transformers: More Than Meets the Eye	2026	Elliot Eismin	Transformers	Active	
Fallout	2026	Keith Elwin	Fallout	Active	
AC/DC Remastered	2026	John Borg	AC/DC	Active	

== See also ==
- List of Data East pinball machines
- List of Sega Pinball machines
- List of pinball machines
- List of pinball manufacturers
- Glossary of pinball terms
