= Cassandra Peterson filmography =

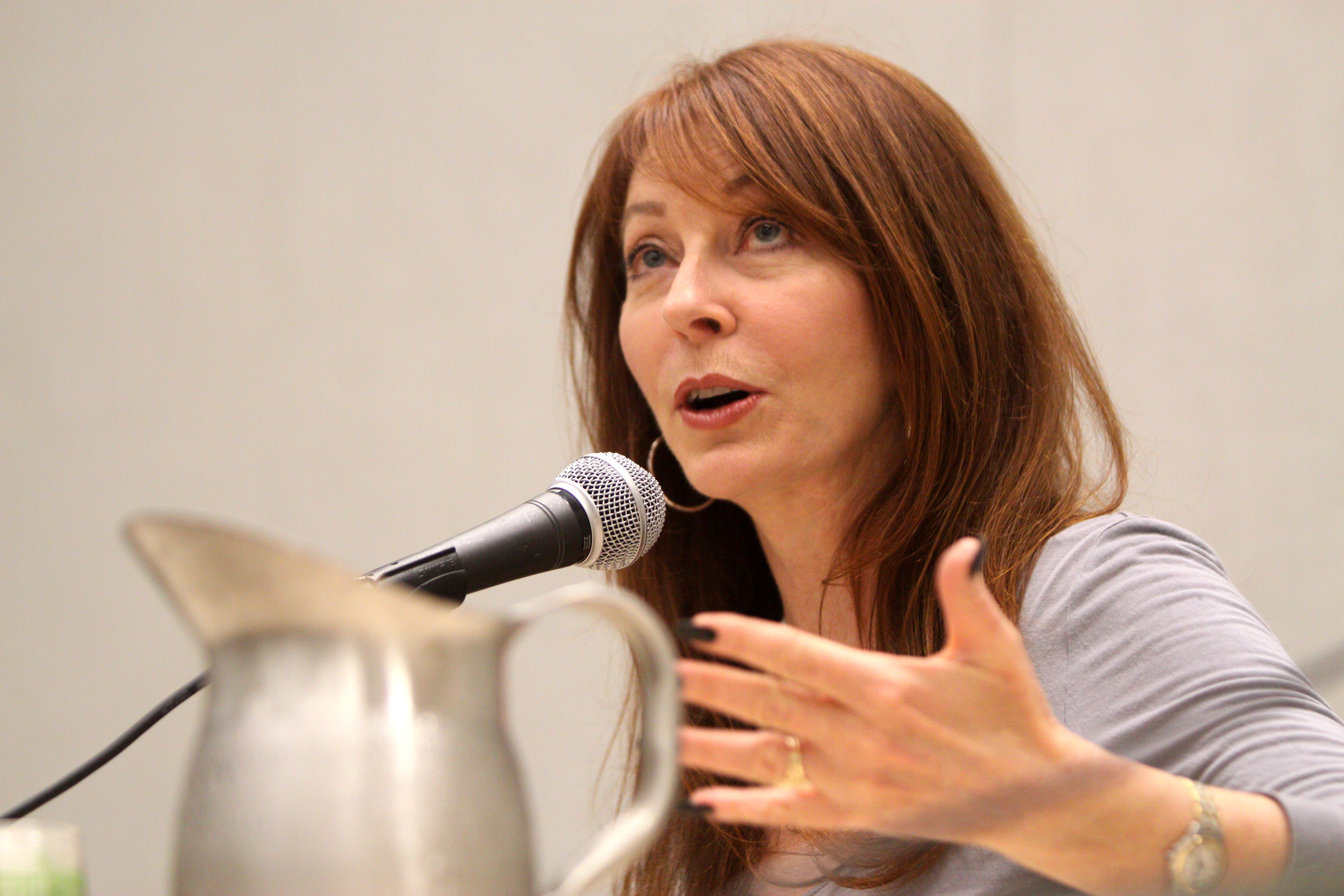
Cassandra Peterson, on the Elvira panel, at the Phoenix Comicon in Phoenix, Arizona

Cassandra Peterson is an American actress best known for her portrayal of the horror hostess character Elvira, Mistress of the Dark. Peterson gained fame on Los Angeles television station KHJ-TV in her stage persona as Elvira, hosting Elvira's Movie Macabre, a weekly B movie presentation. Peterson has made Elvira and non-Elvira appearances in a number of films and television programs.

== Filmography ==
Key
†	Denotes works that have not yet been released

=== Film ===
Year	Title	Role	Notes
1971	Diamonds are Forever	Dancer	Uncredited
1972	Roma	Dancer	Uncredited
1974	The Working Girls	Katya	
1980	Cheech and Chong's Next Movie	Hostage	
1980	Coast to Coast	Dinner Party Guest	
1981	King of the Mountain	Neighbor	
1982	Jekyll and Hyde... Together Again	Busty Nurse	
1983	The Sting II	O'Malley's Girl	
1983	Filmgore	Elvira	
1983	Stroker Ace	Girl with Lugs	
1985	Pee-wee's Big Adventure	Biker Mama	
1985	Get Out of My Room	Elvira	Visual album
1986	Echo Park	Sheri	
1986	Allan Quatermain and the Lost City of Gold	Sorais	
1988	Elvira: Mistress of the Dark	Elvira/Morgana Talbot	
1991	Ted & Venus	Lisa	
1992	The Ketchup Vampires	Elvira (voice)	
1993	Acting on Impulse	Roxy	
1996	It's My Party	Party Guest	Uncredited
1996	The Ketchup Vampires II	Elvira (voice)	
1996	Dear God	Herself	Uncredited
1999	Encounter in the Third Dimension	Elvira	
2001	Elvira's Haunted Hills	Elvira/Lady Elura Hellsubus	
2006	Red Riding Hood	Hunter's Mom	
2006	Tomoko's Kitchen	Mary Mulders	Short
2006	Vampira: The Movie	Herself	Documentary
2007	The Secret World of Superfans	Herself	Documentary
2008	The Boneyard Collection	Elvira	Segment: "Her Morbid Desires"
2009	The Haunted World of El Superbeasto	Amber (voice)	
2010	All About Evil	Linda Thompson	
2013	Rewind This!	Herself	Documentary
2013	Bruno & Earlene Go to Vegas	Artie Duke	
2013	First Period	Ms. Glenn	
2014	Electric Boogaloo: The Wild, Untold Story of Cannon Films	Herself	Documentary
2014	Vault of the Macabre	Narrator	Short
2016	LEGO Scooby-Doo! Haunted Hollywood	Drella Diabolique (voice)	
2019	In Search of Darkness	Herself	Documentary
2019	Scooby-Doo! Return to Zombie Island	Elvira (voice)	
2020	Happy Halloween, Scooby-Doo!	Elvira (voice)	
2020	In Search of Darkness: Part II	Herself	Documentary
2021	Shoplifters of the World	Vintage Clerk	
2022	The Munsters	Barbara Carr	
2022	In Search of Darkness: Part III	Herself	Documentary
2026	R.L. Stine's Pumpkinhead 2	Cassandra	

=== Television ===
Year	Title	Role	Notes
1978–1983	Fantasy Island	Ftatateetah/Esther	3 episodes
1979	Happy Days	Lola	Episode: "Burlesque"
1979	Flying High	Hooker	Episode: "Ladies of the Night"
1980	Beyond Westworld	Dance Hall Girl	Episode: "Westworld Destroyed"
1981–1986	Elvira's Movie Macabre	Elvira	140 episodes
1982	Open All Night	Taffy	Episode: "Sitting Ducks"
1982	Harper Valley PTA	Redhead	Episode: "Stella Rae"
1982	Counterattack: Crime in America	Blackjack Dealer	Episode: "March 28, 1982"
1982	New Wave Theatre	Elvira	Episode: "1.2"
1982–1983	CHiPs	Elvira	2 episodes
1983	The Paragon of Comedy	Elvira	TV special
1983	Alice	Monique	Episode: "Mel's Dream Car"
1983	Balboa	Angie Stockard	TV movie
1983	St. Elsewhere	Judy	Episode: "Ties That Bind"
1983	Real People	Elvira	Episode: "October 26, 1983"
1983	Thicke of the Night	Elvira	Episode: "November 30, 1983"
1984	Last of the Great Survivors	Elvira	TV movie
1984	Cheeseball Presents	Elvira	TV special
1984	Uncensored	Various	TV special
1984	Elvira's MTV Halloween Party	Elvira	TV special
1984–1985	The Fall Guy	Elvira	2 episodes
1985	Bob Hope Lampoons Television	Elvira	TV Special
1985	Bob Hope Buys NBC?	Elvira	TV special
1985–1987	ThrillerVideo	Elvira	24 episodes
1986	WrestleMania 2	Elvira	TV special
1986	Elvira's Halloween Special	Elvira	TV special
1987	Saturday Night Live	Elvira	Episode: "Dabney Coleman/The Cars"
1988	Joan Rivers and Friends Salute Heidi Abromowitz	Elvira	TV special
1988	The Magical World of Disney	Elvira	TV special
1989	Just Say Julie	Elvira	Episode: "March 17, 1989"
1989	On The Television	Various	Episode: "The Not-so-Wonderful Years"
1989	The Super Mario Bros. Super Show!	Elvira	2 episodes
1989	WCW Saturday Night	Elvira	Episode: "September 30, 1989"
1989	Totally Hidden Video	Elvira	Episode: "October 31, 1989"
1989–1990	Elvira's Thriller Theatre	Elvira	19 episodes
1989–1990	Heavy Metal Heaven	Elvira	6 episodes
1990–1991	Elvira's Midnight Madness	Elvira	15 episodes
1991	The Horror Hall of Fame II	Elvira	TV special
1991	Joe Bob's Drive-In Theater	Elvira	Episode: "October 31, 1991"
1992	Parker Lewis Can't Lose	Elvira	Episode: "Boy Meets Girl II"
1992	Heartstoppers: Horror at the Movies	Elvira	TV special
1992	Ring of the Musketeers	Jennifer	TV movie
1993	The Elvira Show	Elvira	Unaired CBS pilot
1993	Elvira's Halloween Movie Schlock-A-Thon	Elvira	TV special
1994	Fox Halloween Bash	Elvira	TV special
1995	Attack of the Killer B-Movies	Elvira	TV special
1996	Space Ghost Coast to Coast	Elvira	Episode: "Switcheroo"
1997	Nash Bridges	Frankie	Episode: "Sniper"
1997	Monster Mania	Elvira	TV special
1999	Attack of the 50 Foot Monster Mania	Elvira	TV special
2000	Bride of Monster Mania	Elvira	TV special
2001	Scares & Dares	Elvira	TV special
2004	Monsterama: A Tribute to Horror Hosts	Elvira	TV special
2004	Elvira's Horror Classics	Elvira	6 episodes
2004	Hollywood's Creepiest Creatures	Elvira	TV special
2005	Playboy Presents: Hef's Halloween Spooktacular	Elvira	TV special
2005	Super Robot Monkey Team Hyperforce Go!	Severina (voice)	Episode: "Season of the Skull"
2007	The Search for the Next Elvira	Herself/Elvira	4 episodes
2009	The Scream	Elvira	Web series
2009	Medium	Elvira	Episode: "Bite Me"
2010–2011	Elvira's Movie Macabre	Elvira	26 episodes
2011	Last Man Standing	Elvira	Episode: "Last Halloween Standing"
2012	RuPaul's Drag Race: All Stars	Elvira	Episode: "Dynamic Drag Duos"
2012–2024	RuPaul's Drag Race	Elvira/Herself	3 episodes
2013	Written By a Kid	Mother	Episode: "Valentine's Day...That I Don't Believe"
2013	Face Off	Elvira	Episode: "Living Art"
2013–2017	Teenage Mutant Ninja Turtles	Mrs. Campbell/Computer Voice/Utrom Queen (voice)	6 episodes
2014	13 Nights of Elvira	Elvira	13 episodes
2015–2019	Halloween Wars	Elvira	3 episodes
2018	Storage Wars	Elvira	Episode: "Scariest Lockers"
2019	RuPaul's Drag Race: Untucked	Elvira	Episode: "Monster Ball"
2020	JJ Villard's Fairy Tales	Queen (voice)	Episode: "Snow White"
2020	In Search of the Sanderson Sisters: A Hocus Pocus Hulaween Takeover	Elvira	TV special
2021	Elvira's 40th Anniversary, Very Scary, Very Special Special	Elvira	4 episodes
2021	The Goldbergs	Elvira	Episode: "The Hunt for the Great Albino Pumpkin"
2021	Netflix and Chills with Dr. Elvira	Dr. Elvira	Netflix shorts
2021–2022	Dota: Dragon's Blood	Lirrak (voice)	3 episodes
2022	The Last Drive-in with Joe Bob Briggs	Herself	Episode: "Joe Bob's Haunted Halloween Hangout"
2022	The Boulet Brothers' Dragula: Titans	Herself	Episode: "Halloween House Party"
2024	John Mulaney Presents: Everybody's in LA	Self	1 episode
2025	Pee-wee as Himself	Self	Documentary
2026	Celebrity Weakest Link	Self	Episode: "Fright Night" (Season 2, Episode 4)

=== Video Games ===
Year	Title	Role	Notes
1989	Elvira and the Party Monsters	Elvira	Pinball machine
1990	Elvira: Mistress of the Dark	Elvira	
1991	Elvira: The Arcade Game	Elvira	
1992	Elvira II: The Jaws of Cerberus	Elvira	
1996	Scared Stiff	Elvira	Pinball machine
2007	Pain	Elvira	
2016	Call of Duty: Infinite Warfare	Elvira	"Attack of the Radioactive Thing!" DLC
2019	Elvira's House of Horrors	Elvira	Pinball machine
2024	Killer Klowns from Outer Space: The Game	Elvira	DLC character

=== Music videos ===
Year	Title	Artist
1980	"Mondo Sinistro"	Al Stewart
1980	"Dangerous Man"	Odds
1985	"Born in East L.A."	Cheech Marin
1986	"My Mistake"	Phantom, Rocker & Slick
2008	"Zombie Killer"	Leslie and the LY's
2009	"Mistress of the Dark"	Ghoultown
2010	"What Can I Do?"	The Black Belles
2012	"Red"	The 69 Eyes
2012	"Glamazon"	RuPaul
2012	"Responsitrannity"	RuPaul
2014	"Gimme Something Good"	Ryan Adams
