= Monster Ball (RuPaul's Drag Race) =

- RuPaul's Drag Race episode
- Episode no.: Season 11; Episode 5
- Presented by: RuPaul
- Original air date: March 28, 2019

Guest appearances
- Cara Delevingne (guest judge); Elvira (guest judge); Trixie Mattel

Episode chronology
| ← Previous "Trump: The Rusical" | Next → "The Draglympics" |
- RuPaul's Drag Race season 11

"Monster Ball" is the fifth episode of the eleventh season of the American reality competition television series RuPaul's Drag Race, which aired on VH1 on March 28, 2019. The episode's main challenge tasks the contestants with presenting three Halloween-inspired looks in a ball. Cara Delevingne and Cassandra Peterson (also known as Elvira) are guest judges. Trixie Mattel also makes a guest appearance to assist with the mini-challenge.

Brooke Lynn Hytes wins the episode's main challenge. Ariel Versace is eliminated from the competition after placing in the bottom and losing a lip-sync contest against Shuga Cain to "I'm Your Baby Tonight" (1990) by Whitney Houston.

== Episode ==
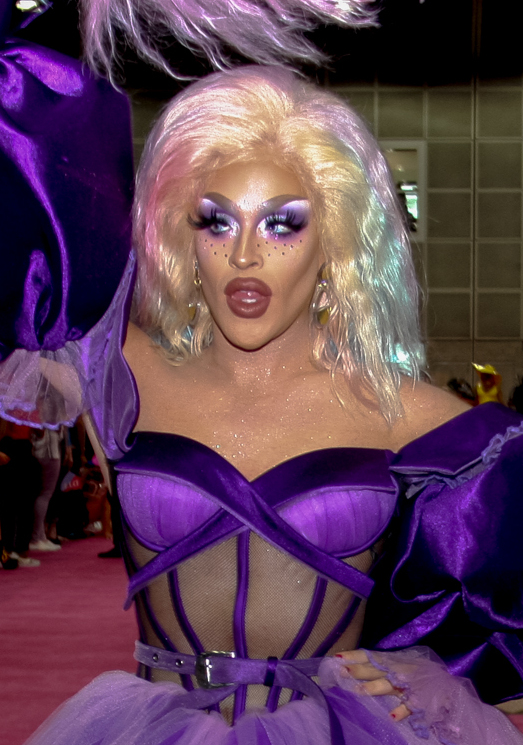
Ariel Versace is eliminated from the competition.

The contestants return to the Werk Room after Mercedes Iman Diamond's elimination on the previous episode. The contestants discuss the budding relationship between Brooke Lynn Hytes and Vanessa Vanjie Mateo. On a new day, RuPaul greets the group and reveals the mini-challenge, which tasks the contestants with dressing as living dolls. Trixie Mattel makes a guest appearance to assist. Ra'Jah O'Hara wins the mini-challenge.

RuPaul then reveals the main challenge, which tasks the contestants with creating three Halloween-inspired looks for the Monster Ball. The three runway categories are "Trampy Trick or Treater", "Witch Please!", and "MILF Eleganza". For the third category, contestants must use materials provided in the Werk Room. The contestants begin to create their looks. RuPaul returns to the Werk Room to meet with each contestant individually, asking questions and offering advice. On elimination day, the contestants make final preparations for the fashion show. The group discuss their drag and Halloween experiences.

On the main stage, RuPaul welcomes fellow judges Michelle Visage and Ross Mathews, as well as guest judges Cara Delevingne and Cassandra Peterson (also known as Elvira). RuPaul shares the main challenge assignment, then the fashion show commences. After the contestants present their looks, the judges deliver their critiques, deliberate, then share the results with the group. Brooke Lynn Hytes, Plastique Tiara, and Yvie Oddly receive positive critiques, and Brooke Lynn Hytes wins the challenge. Ariel Versace, Shuga Cain, and Silky Nutmeg Ganache receive negative critiques, and Silky Nutmeg Ganache is deemed safe. Ariel Versace and Shuga Cain place in the bottom and face off in a lip-sync contest to "I'm Your Baby Tonight" (1990) by Whitney Houston. Shuga Cain wins the lip-sync and Ariel Versace is eliminated from the competition. She returns to the Werk Room to write a message using lipstick on the mirror for her fellow contestants.

== Production and broadcast ==
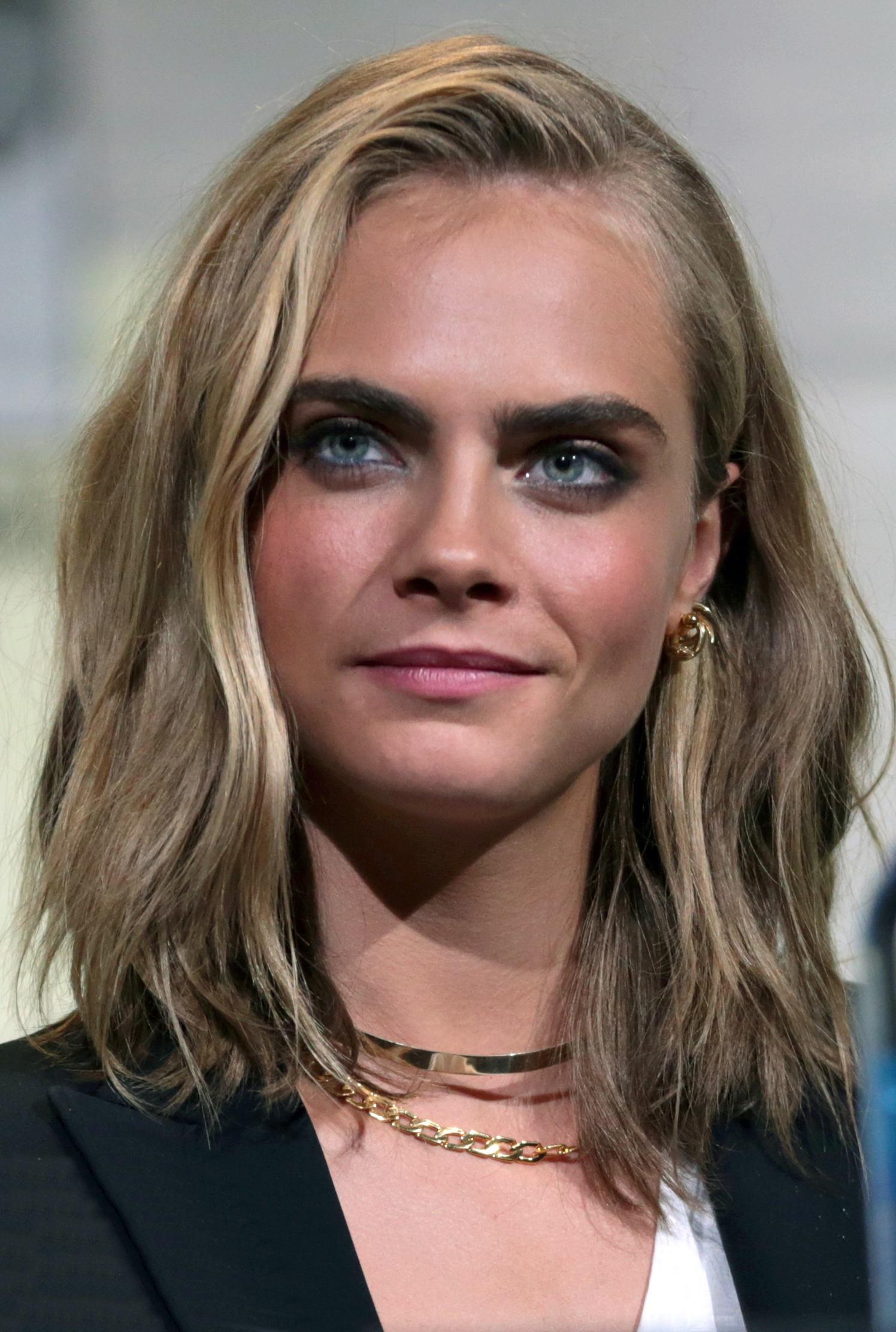
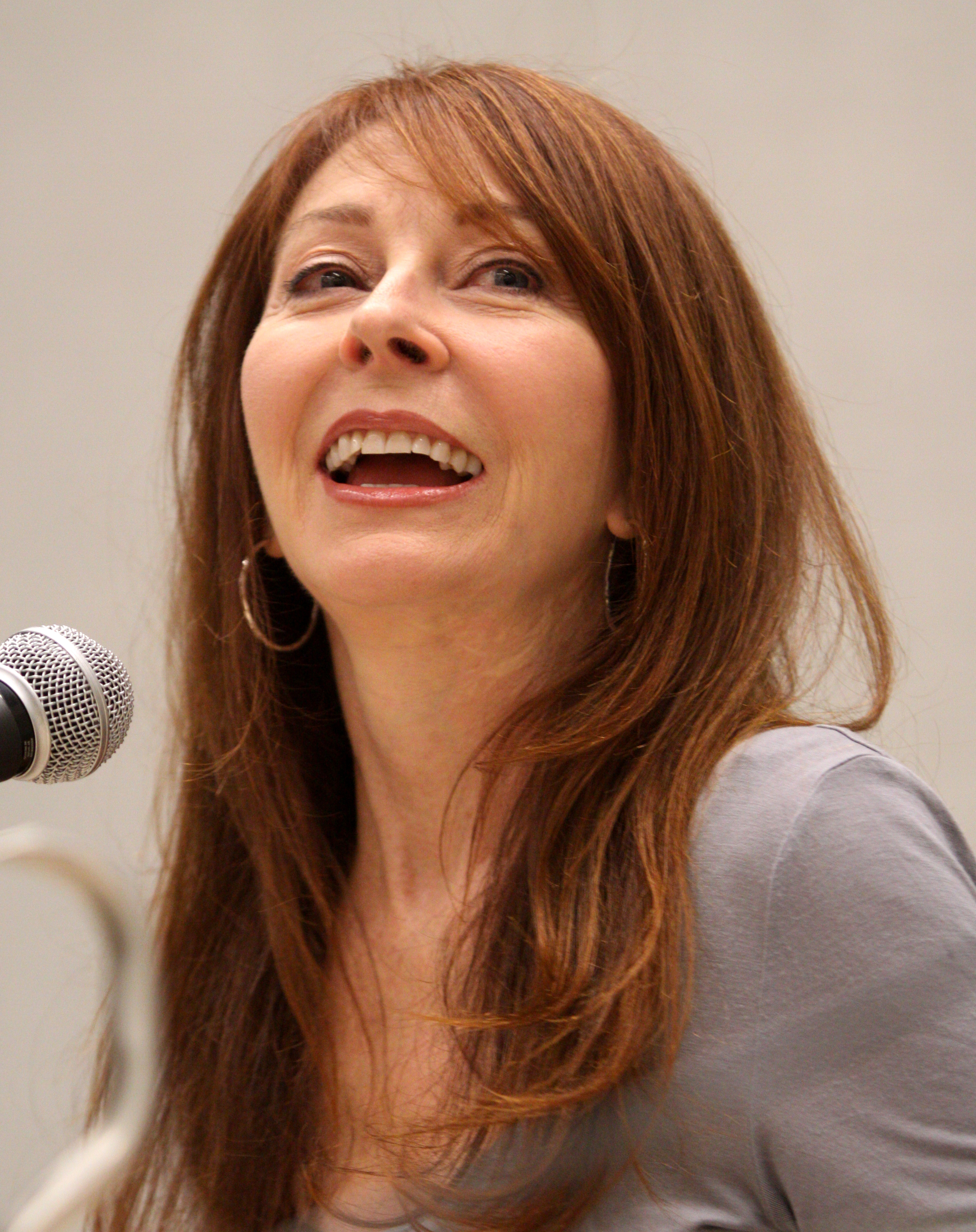
Cara Delevingne (top, pictured in 2016) and Cassandra Peterson (bottom, pictured in 2011), also known as Elvira, are guest judges.

The episode originally aired on March 28, 2019.

Ariel Versace falls during the lip-sync contest.

=== Fashion ===
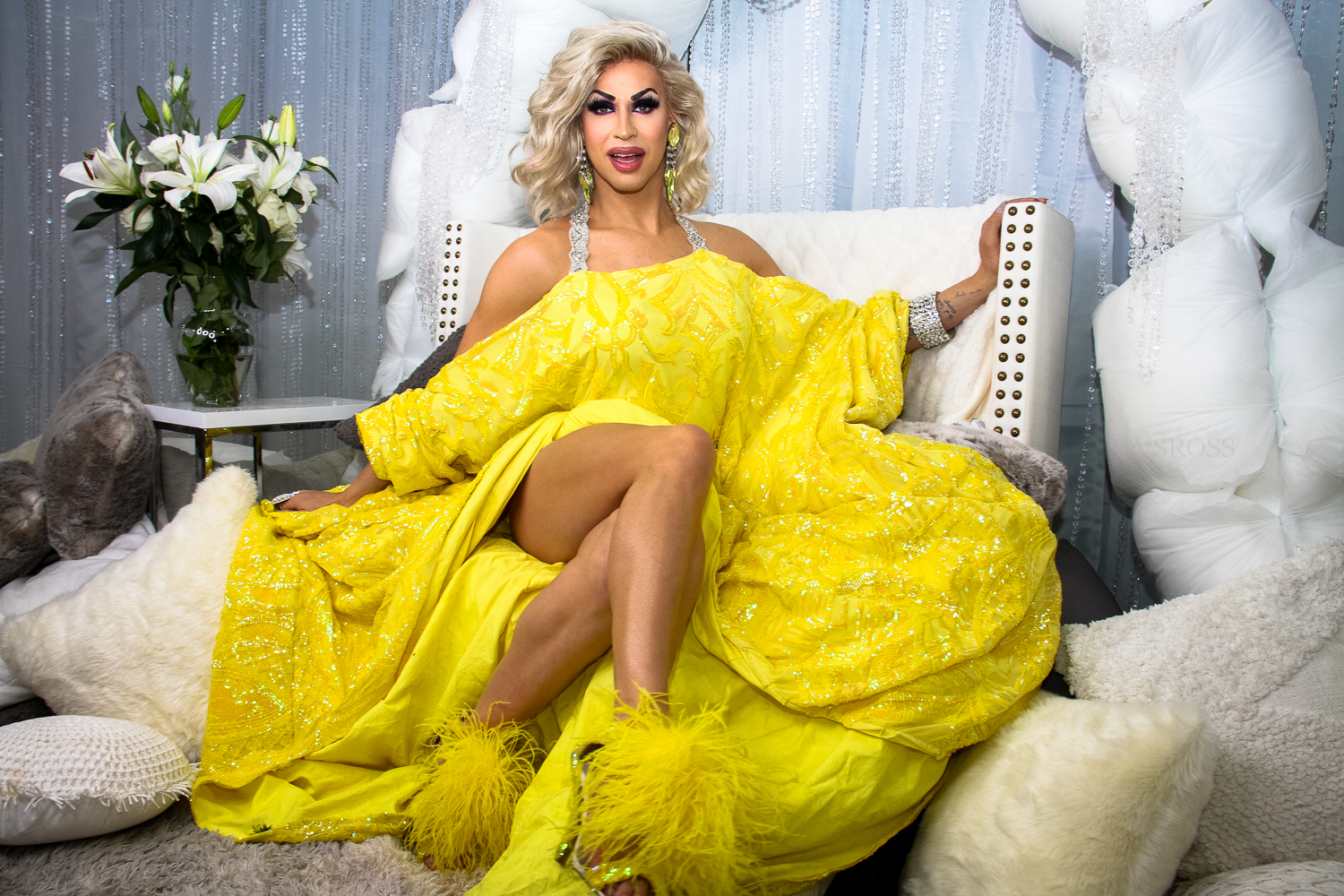
Brooke Lynn Hytes (pictured at RuPaul's DragCon LA in 2019) wins the main challenge.

For "Trampy Trick or Treater", A'keria C. Davenport wears a black-and-white poker dealer-inspired outfit. She has a card table as a prop. Vanessa Vanjie Mateo wears a white outfit with large wings and a matching headpiece. Plastique Tiara wears a Playboy Bunny-inspired pink outfit with rabbit ears. Scarlet Envy's black-and-gold outfit includes gold boots and an eyepatch. Inspired by The Little Shop of Horrors, Nina West's outfit resembles a venus flytrap. Ra'Jah O'Hara has a cat-inspired outfit with thigh-high black boots and a face mask. Shuga Cain's outfit is inspired by troll dolls. Brooke Lynn Hytes presents a mummy-inspired look and she walks en pointe. Ariel Versace has a white outfit with many syringes on her shoulders and a large red wig. Yvie Oddly has a dinosaur-inspired green outfit with claws and a blonde wig. Silky Nutmeg Ganache has a pink-and-white jumpsuit, a single horn, and a large pink wig.

For "Witch Please!", A'keria C. Davenport wears a black outfit with a headpiece. Vanessa Vanjie Mateo has a black dress with feathers and a red wig and a black fascinator. Plastique Tiara wears a black outfit with two horns. Scarlet Envy has a swamp-inspired outfit with a witch's hat. Nina West's outfit is inspired by Salem Witches. Ra'Jah O'Hara wears an emerald green outfit inspired by Oz. Shuga Cain is inspired by Bloody Mary. Her outfit gives the illusion of dripping blood and she has a long blonde wig. Brooke Lynn Hytes's outfit is inspired by Enchantress from the Suicide Squad. She wears a skull on the top of her head. Ariel Versace has as black dress and sunglasses. Yvie Oddly has a short black dress, a black hat, and a blonde wig. Silky Nutmeg Ganache's look is based on the Wicked Witch from The Wiz.

For "MILF Eleganza", A'keria C. Davenport has a spider-inspired black outfit and a blonde wig. Vanessa Vanjie Mateo wears a black-and-green outfit with a large gravestone as a headpiece. Plastique Tiara has a black dress and a blonde wig. She carries a scythe. Scarlet Envy's gold outfit with netting is inspired by the Creature from the Black Lagoon. Nina West removes her face mask to reveal a decayed mouth. She has a large purple wig. Ra'Jah O'Hara has a white outfit inspired by a bone collector. She has a red wig and two horns. Shuga Cain has a red wig, horns, and a necklace with small animal skulls. She carries a skull. Brooke Lynn Hytes has a black outfit inspired by a black widow; she has a snake wrapped around her and she carries a cane. Ariel Versace wears a mermaid-inspired outfit with a matching bow, blue boots, and a large blue wig. Yvie Oddly's look is inspired by voodoo dolls. She has various small body parts affixed to her as well as a red wig. Silly Nutmeg Ganache has a red dress, two horns, and a blonde wig. She also carries a skull.

== Reception ==
Kate Kulzick of The A.V. Club gave the episode a rating of 'A-'. Writing for Vulture, Matt Rogers rated the episode four out of five stars. Sam Brooks ranked the performance number 154 in The Spinoff's 2019 "definitive ranking" of the show's 162 lip-syncs to date. In 2021, Tom Breihan of Stereogum called the performance "dramatic and eventful".

== See also ==
- Bloody Mary folklore in popular culture
- Cassandra Peterson filmography
