= Deadpool (pinball) =

2018 pinball machine

- Deadpool (pro) flyer
- Manufacturer: Stern Pinball
- Release date: August 2018
- System: Spike 2
- Design: George Gomez
- Programming: Tanio Klyce, Mike Kyzivat
- Artwork: Jeremy Packer (Zombie Yeti)
- Mechanics: Robert Blakeman
- Music: Vince Pontarelli
- Sound: Jerry Thompson

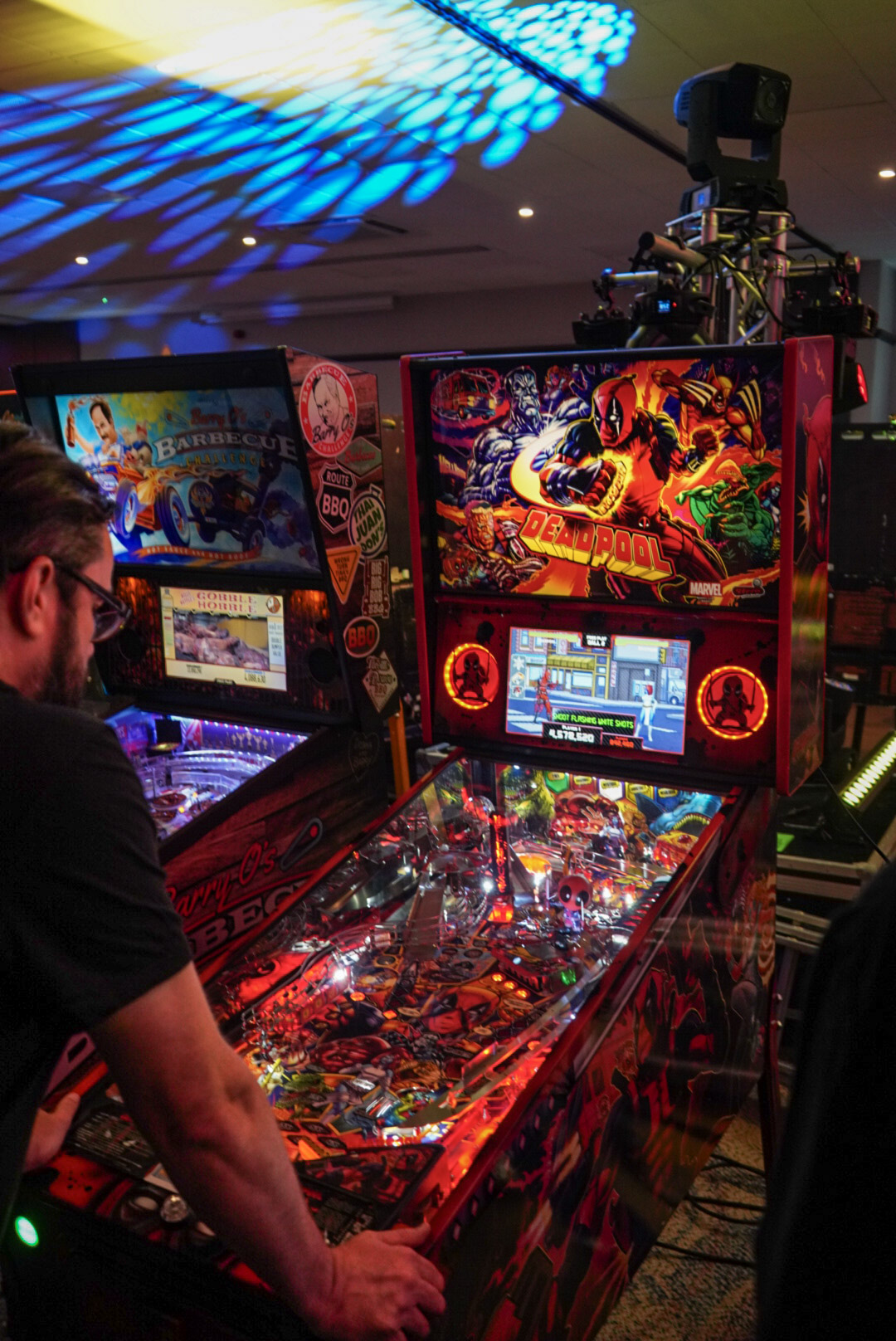
Deadpool at UK Pinfest 2025

Deadpool is a pinball machine designed by George Gomez and released by Stern Pinball in August 2018 based on the comic books of the same name. Nolan North provided voicework as the voice of Deadpool. Brian Huskey provided the voice of Lil' Deadpool and Jennifer Lafleur provided the voice of Dazzler.

== Development ==
The Deadpool pinball machine followed several Marvel-themed pinball machines, including Spider-Man in 2007 and Guardians of the Galaxy in 2017. It is the second pinball table to be based on the character, with the first one being a virtual pinball table from the Marvel Pinball video game, developed by Zen Studios also with Nolan North as Deadpool.

George Gomez served as lead designer on the game and Zombie Yeti created the art. The game drew from the comic book franchise and included the characters Wolverine, Mystique and Sabretooth.

== Overview ==
Stern created three versions; Pro, Premium and Limited Edition. All versions include wireforms and physical ball-lock in the handle of the katana.

The Premium and Limited Edition models feature an additional 8 drop targets, motorized disco ball with disco-illumination effects, custom-molded Wolverine and Dazzler action figures, and with a custom-molded chimichanga truck time machine.

The Limited Edition model is limited to 500 units and features a numbered plaque, custom-themed backglass, cabinet artwork and art blades as well as a shaker motor and anti-reflection glass.

Both Premium (Cassette) and Limited Edition (12-inch vinyl) models come with a Deadpool soundtrack featuring 11 music tracks which differ from those included on the Deadpool soundtrack.

=== Gameplay ===
Deadpool includes 4 different skill shots, 6 battles modes, 4 quest modes and 3 wizard modes.

== Reception ==
A Pinball Mag review appreciated the design and gameplay, but found the toys to be less original than on some other games.

== See also ==
- List of Stern Pinball machines
