= Ghostbusters (pinball) =

2016 pinball machine

- Ghostbusters (premium) flyer
- Manufacturer: Stern Pinball
- Release date: June 2016
- System: SPIKE
- Design: John Trudeau
- Programming: Dwight Sullivan
- Artwork: Jeremy Packer (Zombie Yeti)
- Music: Ray Parker Jr.
- Sound: Jerry Thompson
- Voices: Ernie Hudson

Ghostbusters is a pinball machine designed by John Trudeau and released by Stern Pinball in June 2016. It is predominantly based on the first Ghostbusters film, but with some elements from Ghostbusters II. Ernie Hudson (Winston Zeddemore) recorded custom speech and guides the player into becoming the latest member of the Ghostbusters team.

== Design and layout ==
Ghostbusters was one of the last pinball machines from Stern to use a DMD monochrome display rather than a full colour display of later machines. In the announcement trailer for the game the design and artwork were highlighted.

Ecto goggles hologram

Stern created three versions; Pro, Premium and Limited Edition. The Premium and Limited Edition models also feature what is described as "interactive holographic Ecto Goggles" which shows an animated ghost; this is not a hologram but instead a small hidden screen which uses a Pepper's ghost illusion. They also feature “para-normal” magnetic slingshots which unlike normal slingshots have no moving parts. In addition to moving up and down as on the Pro model, Slimer can move side to side; there are also additional custom molded models. All versions include the Stay Puft marshmallow man.

The premium and limited editions include a subway ramp leading to a ball lock, and have an additional ramp in this area; whereas the pro model has a simpler design. Other features shared between all models include three pop bumpers, two Scoleri brothers drop targets, Newton ball mechanism, numerous RGD-LEDs, and Tobin's spirit guide scoop. On each side of the machine is a double inlane, and single outlane.

The Limited Edition model was limited to 500 units and features a numbered plaque, custom-themed backglass, cabinet artwork as well as a shaker motor and anti-reflection glass. Optional official accessories were released, including an illuminated topper based on the top of Ecto-1.

In addition to the new voicework recorded by Ernie Hudson, clips of some of the cast of the film are used, including Bill Murray (Peter Venkmen), and Dan Ackroyd (Ray Stantz).

Limited edition playfield

== Gameplay ==
The game starts with selecting one of six possible skillshots on the main part of the playfield, or with one of the upper rollovers. There are nine scene modes arranged in three ladders: The Public Library (2), The Sedgewick Hotel (3), and Dana Barrett’s Apartment (4). After completing one of these ladders "We Came, We Saw, We Kicked Its..." is played. The primary multiball is storage facility multiball where all the ghosts escape containment and the player needs to recapture them all. There are three hurry-up modes, including the Scoleri Brothers where the drop targets representing them need to be hit. The game has two video modes; one is "Negative reinforcement" which involves guessing Zener cards and the other is "Don't cross the streams" where ghosts need to be caught using two proton streams.

Ghosts are collected as the game is played, with a game feature available every 20 ghosts until 100 are collected for Mass hysteria multiball, a multiball mode where control of the flippers is reversed.

After all nine scenes have been played "We’re Ready To Believe You" can be started, which is a timed mode to collect ghosts. If this mode is beaten the games multi-stage wizard mode "Are You a God" can be played.

The game includes a "scare feature" where it captures the ball and screams loudly before returning the ball. It also includes "midnight madness", a special six-ball multiball mode that starts at midnight (according to the clock on the machine) if a game is in the middle of being played.

== Reception ==
Pinball Mag reviewed the game with updated software (released in 2019), the earlier versions of which had been criticized by players. The use of the license including music, Ernie Hudson and toys were praised as a world under glass. The originality of the playfield layout was also praised, as was the depth of play and missions. It was criticized for being "punitive", partly due to the larger than usual gap between the flippers. IGN didn't play the machine, but praised the artwork and Ecto-goggles.

== Digital version ==
A digital version of the premium edition was released for The Pinball Arcade and Stern Pinball Arcade in 2017. This version was never updated with the 2019 software used on the physical table.

== See also ==
- List of Stern Pinball machines
