= The Simpsons (pinball) =

1990 pinball machine

- The Simpsons pinball flyer
- Manufacturer: Data East Pinball
- Release date: October 1990
- System: Data East (Version 3)
- Design: Joe Kaminkow, Ed Cebula
- Programming: Rehman Merchant
- Artwork: Kevin O'Connor, Margaret Hudson
- Mechanics: Ed Cebula, John Lund
- Music: Brian Schmidt
- Sound: Brian Schmidt
- Voices: Dan Castellaneta, Nancy Cartwright, Hank Azaria, Harry Shearer
- Production run: 5,502 units

The Simpsons is a 1990 pinball game released by Data East Pinball. It is based on the animated sitcom The Simpsons and features many elements from the series, such as character voices and music. Released in October 1990, the game was popular in the United States, becoming a hit for Data East Pinball. It has been cited as helping increase the popularity of pinball machines at the beginning of the 1990s. The Simpsons pinball game was followed by The Simpsons Pinball Party in 2003.

== Content ==
The pinball machine is modeled after the animated sitcom The Simpsons. The pop bumpers are styled as nuclear reactor cooling towers and several characters from the show function as targets. Other targets depict the Simpson family's favorite foods, such as chocolate ice cream and donuts, and the family bowling. The machine is equipped with a Yamaha synthesizer that plays the theme song from the television series. It also features a computerized voice system on an OKI sound chip, and the characters are constantly talking. The original voices of the characters from the series are used. Mr. Burns says "Smithers, fire that man!" and "Don't you know how to use flippers?", while Bart says lines like "Don't have a cow, man," "Way to go, man," "You blew it, man," and "Hey, man, we're both underachievers." This was also the last pinball machine by Data East Pinball to utilise an alphanumeric display before changing to the dot-matrix display. The artwork was drawn by hand in pencil.

== Development and release ==
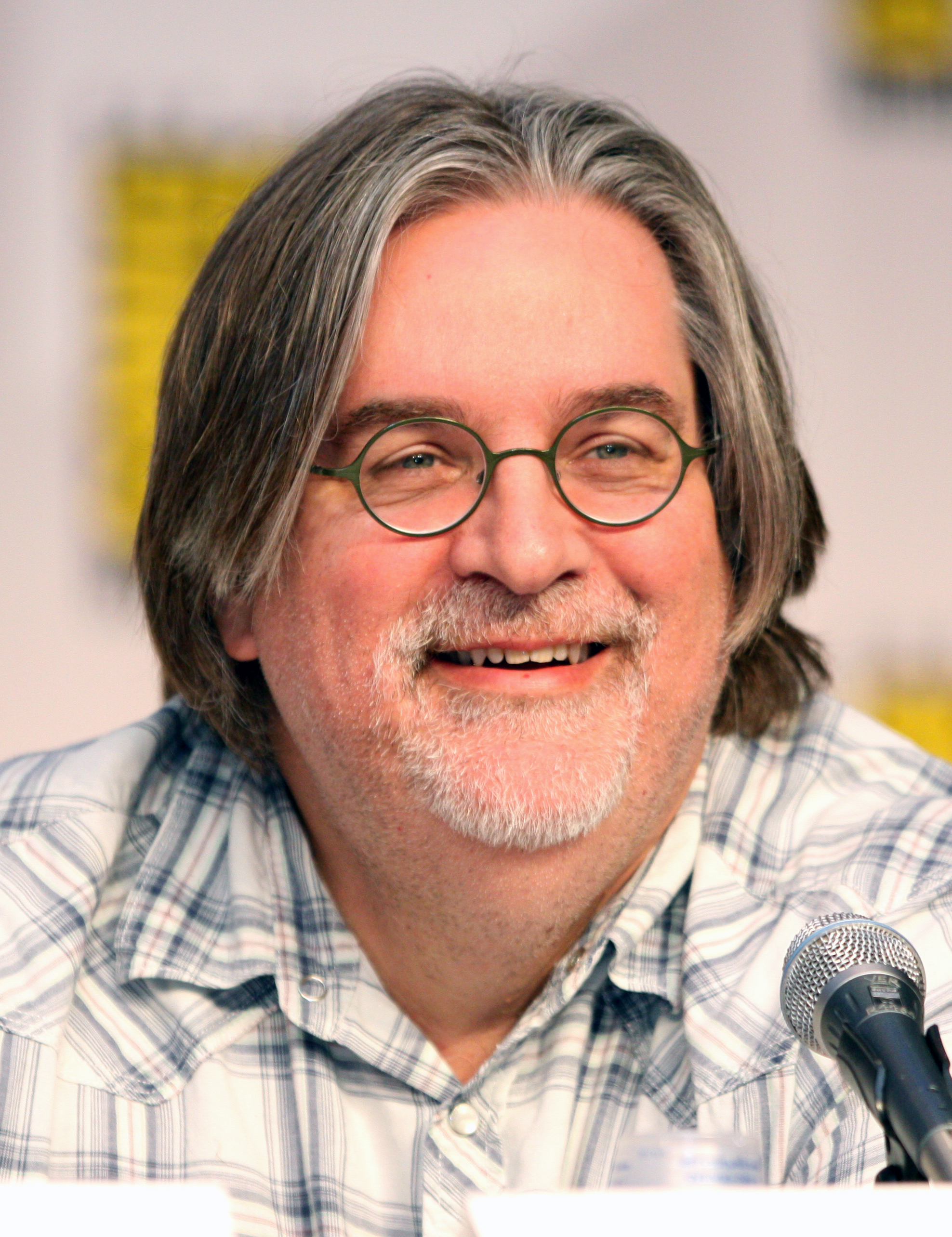
The Simpsons creator Matt Groening gave advice to the producers of the game.

The pinball game was released by Data East Pinball in 1990. It was licensed by Fox and produced in Data East's factory in Melrose Park, Illinois. According to an article in Chicago Sun-Times, the producers took advice from The Simpsons creator Matt Groening while developing the game. In 1993 Groening reflected positively on the experience saying, "The Simpsons has allowed me to do all the good stuff I always wanted to do as a kid. Like design a pinball machine." On November 9, 1990, Data East executive vice-president Gary Stern described the game to the press as "fun – a whole package ... voices, music, artwork, great ramps." He also noted that "This game is already on its way to becoming a monster hit." In 2007, Stern said in an interview with License! that "While we export about one-third of our games, that first [The Simpsons pinball] model did especially well in the U.S."

== Gameplay ==
The game includes a three ball multiball.

== Reception and legacy ==
The Simpsons pinball machine won the award for best pinball game in 1990 by the Amusement and Music Operators Association, a group that represents coin machine operators. According to the Chicago Sun-Times article, pinball players have cited Data East's The Simpsons as a game that helped increase the popularity of pinball. The pinball market had been dead by the end of the 1980s, following the surge of the video game market, but it rose in popularity at the beginning of the 1990s. Tom Henry of The Tampa Tribune wrote in 1991 that pinball games became popular again because they started emphasizing themes: "The artwork, targets and sounds work together to create a story, manufacturers say. The computer unveils the subplot differently, depending on skill levels and the sequence in which shots are made." He cited the Simpsons pinball game as an example of this—a "game with a strong theme."

Simpsons co-creators Sam Simon and Matt Groening as well as basketball player Wilt Chamberlain have owned the game. A second Simpsons pinball machine, The Simpsons Pinball Party (designed by Stern Pinball, the successor to Data East Pinball), was released in 2003.
