= The Hobbit (pinball) =

2016 pinball machine

- The Hobbit pinball flyer
- Manufacturer: Jersey Jack Pinball
- Release date: March 2016
- Design: Joe Balcer
- Programming: Keith Johnson; Ted Estes
- Artwork: Jean-Paul de Win
- Mechanics: Eric Meunier
- Music: Two Steps from Hell
- Sound: David Thiel
- Production run: 4,000

The Hobbit is a widebody pinball machine designed by Joe Balcer and released by Jersey Jack Pinball in March 2016. It is based on the series of films of the same name which is based on J. R. R. Tolkien’s 1937 novel The Hobbit.

== Overview and design ==
The Hobbit is Jersey Jack's second pinball machine and follow-up to The Wizard of Oz machine released in 2013.

The license from Warner Bros. was announced in November 2012 with a target release date of the game just before the third movie. An early version was revealed in October 2014, but a redesign of the game including new playfield art delayed production for over a year. Prior to Jersey Jack Pinball acquiring the license, Stern Pinball had been interested in obtaining it.

Jersey Jack used a lot of the new technology introduced in The Wizard of Oz including a 27-inch LCD monitor mounted in the backbox. A large number of film clips are played on this monitor. A strip of white LED's are used to illuminate the top of the backglass.

The playfield general illumination is much brighter than that used for The Wizard of Oz by using a new LED lighting system with higher-brightness LEDs.

The game has 3 flippers, including mid-field flipper on the right. Normal set-up includes a center-post between the flippers, but with the option to remove it for a more difficult game. The game is controlled by two buttons for the flippers, and the "ring button" located on the lockdown bar. There is a manual plunger to launch each new ball, but at other times an automatic plunger is used. A headphone jack is on the front of the machine.

The computer is housed in a metal box in the cabinet. The computer uses a MSI H81M-P33 mini-ATX motherboard with 8GB of DDR3 RAM, intel Celeron G530 CPU 2.4GHz, and an SSD with a Linux operating system. There is a separate sound board with several connectors to a 7 speaker 2.1 digital audio system. Initially the software had to be updated using a USB drive, but a 2021 update added wi-fi and LAN support; as of March 2025 software updates are still being released.

The standard edition launched with a retail price of US$8,000, and the limited edition and Smaug limited edition at US$8,500, with 1,500 customers pre-paying before release.

== Art design ==
display

The earliest iteration of the design of the main video display began with a circle in the middle for video clips and four panels for other game features. By the third iteration this used linear and hexagon shapes inspired by dwarven geometrical design. The "hexicon" grid in the centre was inspired by the board game The Settlers of Catan, with one hexagon for each of the games 31 main modes.

An early version of the playfield artwork incorporating Erebor was started by Jeff Busch, Jean-Paul de Win completed this incorporating screen-grabs already used on the main display. This version was publicly shown at Pinball Expo 2014. After receiving more art assets from Warner Brothers and receiving feedback the artwork on the lower part of the playfield was changed to feature Smaug.

The dwarven runes around the game spell members of the design team, with the inlane plastics saying "JP de Win was here" on the left, and "Jersey Jack Pinball" on the right.

== Layout ==
playfield, with one beast raised

There is a double in-lane on each side of the machine, each of these lanes is used to raise one of the four corresponding pop-up beasts (warg, orc, goblin, and spider) in the center of the playfield; between these beasts are four L-O-C-K rollovers which are activated by the ball rolling over them. In the left outlane there is a post which can be raised to hold the ball there, with a kickback mechanism that is used in particular modes. There are three banks of drop targets, E-L-F, D-W-A-R-F, and M-A-N, most of which have stand-up targets behind them. Both orbits have a spinner; also there is a vertical up-kicker (VUK) on each side of the machine, one behind D-W drop targets. The game also has two electro-magnets, one of which can be used to help lock a ball.

Towards the top of the playfield are two ramps with a captive ball between them. Towards the back right of the machine are the three pop bumpers, and just above these is a 4.3 inch LCD screen inside a book frame which is used to show mode and shot information. There is a model of the head of Smaug which rotates and speaks.

== Variations in editions ==
All editions include Bilbo Baggins and Gandalf on each side of the backbox, but each version has its own cabinet artwork. The standard version has stainless steel lockdown bar, body armour and legs; the other editions have these components powder coated in colours to match their design. RAD-cals were available as a paid upgrade to the cabinet decals.

Limited and special editions all have an axe on each of the two lower slingshots that swing when the slingshot is hit, invisiglass, and a shaker motor. Unlike the three pop bumpers on the standard edition, two of them are replaced with barrel jump bumpers.

The Smaug edition also includes a gold colored Smaug sculpture in place of the red Smaug on all other versions, and a Smaug themed attract mode.

The Black Arrow special edition uses black pinballs.

== Gameplay ==
Keith Johnson designed the rules for this game, and like his earlier title The Lord of the Rings this game has a deep ruleset. Gameplay is the same between all versions of the table.

At the start of each ball one of four skillshots can be selected.

To qualify modes to start up to three shots/banks are needed: the two ramps, right VUK, and the three target banks. There are 31 main modes and once qualified they can be started by hitting the left (book) ramp. Instructions for playing the mode are shown on the middle of the main monitor and on the book screen. When a main mode is not being played the main monitor shows all modes in a hexagonal grid indicating which have been completed.

In addition to showing the score, most of the rest of the main monitor is used to display the four corner sections for Smaug multiball (3-ball multiball), advance to Erebor (progressed with the spinners), defeat the beasts (4 hurry-ups, which also starts beast frenzy, a 2-ball multiball), and collect the dwarves. The player collects the dwarves of Thorin's Company (Gloin, Oin, Dwalin, Fili, Balin, Bifur, Bofur, Bombur, Thorin, Kili, Nori, Dori, and Ori) by hitting 13 shots. This also starts feast frenzy, a timed mode. Completing all four of these corners, and any of the 31 modes lights an Arkenstone mode.

The three Arkenstone Modes (one from each movie) are "Into the Fire", "Barrel Escape", and "Battle of the Five Armies" which are all mini-wizard multiball modes.

After playing all 31 main modes there is a wizard mode "There and Back Again", the same name as the mini-wizard mode on The Lord of the Rings.

== Reception ==
In a comprehensive review of the standard game Pinball News gave the game an overall 8.8/10 with in-depth ratings for various aspects:

- Layout 8/10
- Art 10/10 preferring the art of the Smaug edition but still liking the standard and LE editions
- Music 9/10
- Sounds 7/10
- Lights 9/10 noting the huge improvement over the earlier The Wizard of Oz games
- Displays 9.5/10
- Rules 9/10

In a 2023 review of the Smaug edition Pinball Mag praised the artwork calling the machine "a beauty", and called the integration of the theme the tour de force of JJP with immersion from the spectacular scenes of the movies and excellent graphic integration of the animations. The light show was also praised, further increasing the immersion along with the sound design. Overall rating it as one of JJP's best machines.
