= CSI: Crime Scene Investigation (pinball) =

2008 pinball machine

- Pinball game backglass
- Manufacturer: Stern Pinball / Steve Ritchie Productions
- Release date: November 2008
- System: Stern S.A.M. Board System
- Design: Pat Lawlor
- Programming: Lonnie D. Ropp, Lyman F. Sheats Jr., Keith P. Johnson
- Artwork: John Youssi, Margaret Hudson
- Music: David Thiel

CSI: Crime Scene Investigation is a Stern pinball game machine designed by Pat Lawlor and released in November 2008. It is based on the CSI: Crime Scene Investigation television series.

== Design ==
The game includes speech by Robert David Hall in his role as Dr. Al Robbins, with call-outs from other actors pulled from the television series.

== Layout ==
The playfield and the outlanes are separated by the phrase "Crime scene do not cross" which is also used as artwork on the left of the playfield.

== Gameplay ==
The game includes a skull where balls are locked for a multiball; this skull was suggested by the creator of the show. There is a Microscope mechanism which captures the ball for another multiball.

== Reception ==
Pinball News gave the table a 53/70 score. While praising the complex multiball modes, they felt that the game lacked depth in rules and theme integration. They also criticized the mini-flipper shots, finding them unsatisfying, and the up-posts in the orbit shots, which they felt disrupted the game's flow.

== See also ==
- List of Stern Pinball machines
