= The Lord of the Rings (pinball) =

2003 pinball machine

- The Lord of the Rings pinball flyer
- Manufacturer: Stern Pinball
- Release date: November 2003
- System: Stern Whitestar
- Players: 4
- Design: George Gomez
- Programming: Dwight Sullivan and Keith Johnson
- Artwork: Jerry Vanderstelt
- Music: Chris Granner
- Sound: Chris Granner
- Voices: Elijah Wood; John Rhys-Davies
- Production run: 5,100 (approximate) (2003 edition); 500 (2009 limited edition)

The Lord of the Rings is a Stern Pinball machine released in November 2003. Designed by George Gomez and programmed by Dwight Sullivan and Keith Johnson, it had an initial production run of 5,100 units, with a further 500 units of a limited-edition version released in 2009.

The game was announced on October 20, 2003 featuring elements from the New Line Cinema Lord of the Rings trilogy; The Fellowship of the Ring, The Two Towers, and The Return of the King, notably a few weeks before the release of the third film in December 2003.

The machine is considered to be a classic of the period, released in the same year as The Simpsons Pinball Party at a pivotal time for Stern Pinball and pinball in general.

== Design ==
On the suggestion of New Line Cinema, Jerry Vanderstelt was used as the primary artist due to his prior licensed The Lord of the Rings artwork, designing the backglass, backbox, and cabinet art.

When designing the sound for the game Chris Granner had full access to movie dialogue and sound effects, but had to rescore the music using the original compositions. Of the c.35 musical themes in the game all except one are excerpted from Howard Shore's score, the exception being the enter-your-initials music. Elijah Wood (Frodo) and John Rhys-Davies (Gimli) recorded custom speech for the game. It was the first game specifically developed to use an "interim" Whitestar MPU board system that had a new 16 bit sound system.

The game has a prominent Balrog bash-toy which moves to expose the jump ramp. This jump ramp leads to "the one ring", where the ball is held by an electro-magnet. A vertical upkicker (VUK) is located on the far left. The paths of the dead upper playfield is reached by another VUK. Near the back of the game are the towers of Orthanc (left) and Barad-Dur (right corner). Aragorn's sword is used as the exit to the right ramp and as a ball-lock mechanism. 12 action figures from Play Along toys are fixed to the playfield.

== Gameplay ==
The machine has one of the deepest rulesets of this period. After a choice of 3 skillshots the initial objective is to collect rings to start main modes and mystery awards. When lit, a shot up the jump ramp to the ring starts one of the main modes:

- Escape the Ring Wraiths
- Gandalf vs Saruman
- Warg Battle
- War of the Ents
- Attack of Shelob
- Destroy the Witch King

When a mode is beaten within the given time, a Gift from the Elves will light. The lit reward can be changed by hitting the far left VUK. When one of these gifts is lit, it is awarded by hitting the Barud-Dur tower:

- 2X Scoring
- Light Extra Ball
- Ring Multiball
- Big Points
- Light Special
- Super Ring Frenzy

After all 6 modes have been played then a timed mini-wizard mode, "There and Back Again," is played. Completing all the shots within the given time lights a Gift from the Elves.

There are also 3 film multiballs, collecting a super jackpot completes that multiball and lights a Gift from the Elves:

- The Fellowship of the Ring. To start this all 9 members of the fellowship are collected, and to win it 8 cross the bridge of Khazad-dum, followed by the final shot for Gandalf to destroy the bridge and defeat the Balrog.
- The Two Towers. To start this 3 balls are locked on Aragorn's sword. The multiball itself is based on the Battle of Helm's Deep.
- The Return of the King. To start this multiball 5,000 souls are collected from the paths of the dead upper playfield. In this multiball 4 shots need to be hit in sequence 7 times to enable super jackpots and completion of the mode

After playing these 3 multiballs, "Destroy the Ring" can be started. After hitting 4 main shots, the ball is shot to and held by the ring; another ball is plunged and the first ball must be hit with this one, ending with Gollum falling into Mount Doom.

If the "Destroy the Ring" mode is won after all other qualifying objectives are met which include collecting all six "Gifts of the Elves," completing all three film multiballs, and playing "There and Back Again" then the seventh and hidden Gift from the Elves is awarded beginning the Valinor wizard mode. If a player does not qualify for Valinor, an onscreen message and call out explain, "You have done well, but there is still more to do," and the DMD screen will list one of the objectives that remains unfinished such as "Complete Fellowship Multiball."

== Limited Edition ==
An updated version was released in 2009 in a limited edition of 500 machines. This was the first limited edition released by Stern. Jack Guarnieri, at the time a pinball distributor, persuaded Gary Stern to release this edition.

The principal changes from the standard edition are real glass (not a translite) used as the backglass, and a gold trim. There is also an option to add a shaker motor which was not available on the standard version. The game is signed by Gary Stern and George Gomez.

== Reception ==
In an extensive review Pinball News praised the sound package using a new hardware system, the animations on the DMD, and found the lighting to be exceptionally good. The only criticism was that there is inconsistency in the typeface used on the game.

RePlay magazine featured the game as the cover story in the November 2003 issue, with Gary Stern dressed as a wizard creating the machine, and a "Lord of the Flippers" article.

The game was also featured in the January 2004 issue of the PinGame Journal.

In a retro review in 2020, Nudge Magazine rated the game 6.7/10 praising the game mechanics and deep code, and criticizing the audio and animations.

== In popular culture ==
Barenaked Ladies referenced this machine in the lyrics for the "Silverball" track from their Silverball album.

== Legacy ==
Jersey Jack Pinball released The Hobbit pinball machine in March 2016, based on the films of the same name, the prequels to the Lord of the Rings series of films. Keith Johnson was also part of the design team for this machine.
