= Yours Cruelly, Elvira =

2021 memoir by Cassandra Peterson

Yours Cruelly, Elvira: Memoirs of the Mistress of the Dark
- Author: Cassandra Peterson
- Audio read by: Cassandra Peterson
- Language: English
- Subject: Memoir
- Publisher: Hachette Book Group
- Publication date: September 22, 2021
- Publication place: United States
- Media type: Print (Hardcover, paperback, E-book) and Audiobook
- Pages: 272 pp
- ISBN: 9780306874352
- OCLC: 1240266593
- Website: Official website

Yours Cruelly, Elvira: Memoirs of the Mistress of the Dark is a 2021 memoir by Cassandra Peterson. For the first time, Peterson opens up about her personal life, her experiences in showbusiness, and the creation of her iconic character Elvira, Mistress of the Dark. The release of the book coincided with the character's 40th anniversary and scored a spot on the New York Times Best Seller list.

== Background ==
Peterson revealed that her memoir was 15 years in the making. It wasn't until the COVID-19 pandemic that she was finally able to sit down and finish it as her gigs for 2020 were cancelled. Peterson, who had the reputation for being guarded when it came to her personal life, gave bits and pieces about her early days in show business in interviews. The reaction from these stories led to people telling her that she should write a book. "I've told these stories to friends for, you know, 100 years, and they're all like, 'Oh, my God, you have to write about this! This is insane!' It really happened, and they just can't believe that." Peterson also admitted to feeling vulnerable when it came to releasing the book, saying, "I do have things where I will wake up in the middle of night and have a slight panic attack going on, [thinking]: 'People are gonna hate me. Nobody's gonna talk to me. My fans don't like me.' I do have moments like that. Then there’s the other side of it, where it’s just a feeling that people should know this stuff." While she was worried about revealing that she was in a relationship with a woman, Peterson said that it felt "very liberating and a real relief." She further explained her hesitation revealing her relationship explaining that she feared for her career, her livelihood, and the public being unable to separate Cassandra from Elvira. At the same she says that she felt like a hypocrite.

== Summary ==
The memoir documents Peterson's humble beginnings, her turbulent relationship with her mother, and her venture into showbusiness. The scars she received after suffering third-degree burns over 35% of her body left her feeling self-conscious, something she continues to deal with today. The memoir also recounts her abusive relationship with her ex-husband and former manager, Mark Pierson, and what finally led to their divorce after 21 years of marriage. Peterson reveals the sexual harassment she received as a young actress in the industry as well as being raped on two occasions. The book alleges that professional basketball player Wilt Chamberlain, who had been a friend, raped her in the 1970s. Her career as a horror-hostess and the creation of Elvira is discussed. Peterson also reveals that she's been in a same-sex relationship for 19 years.

== Reception ==
The book debuted at #4 on the New York Times Best Sellers list, and #2 on Los Angeles Times Best Sellers list.

== Graphic novel ==
A graphic novel adaptation, Yours Cruelly: Becoming Elvira, based on the memoir, is set to be released on September 16, 2026.
