= George Gomez =

Cuban-American video game designer

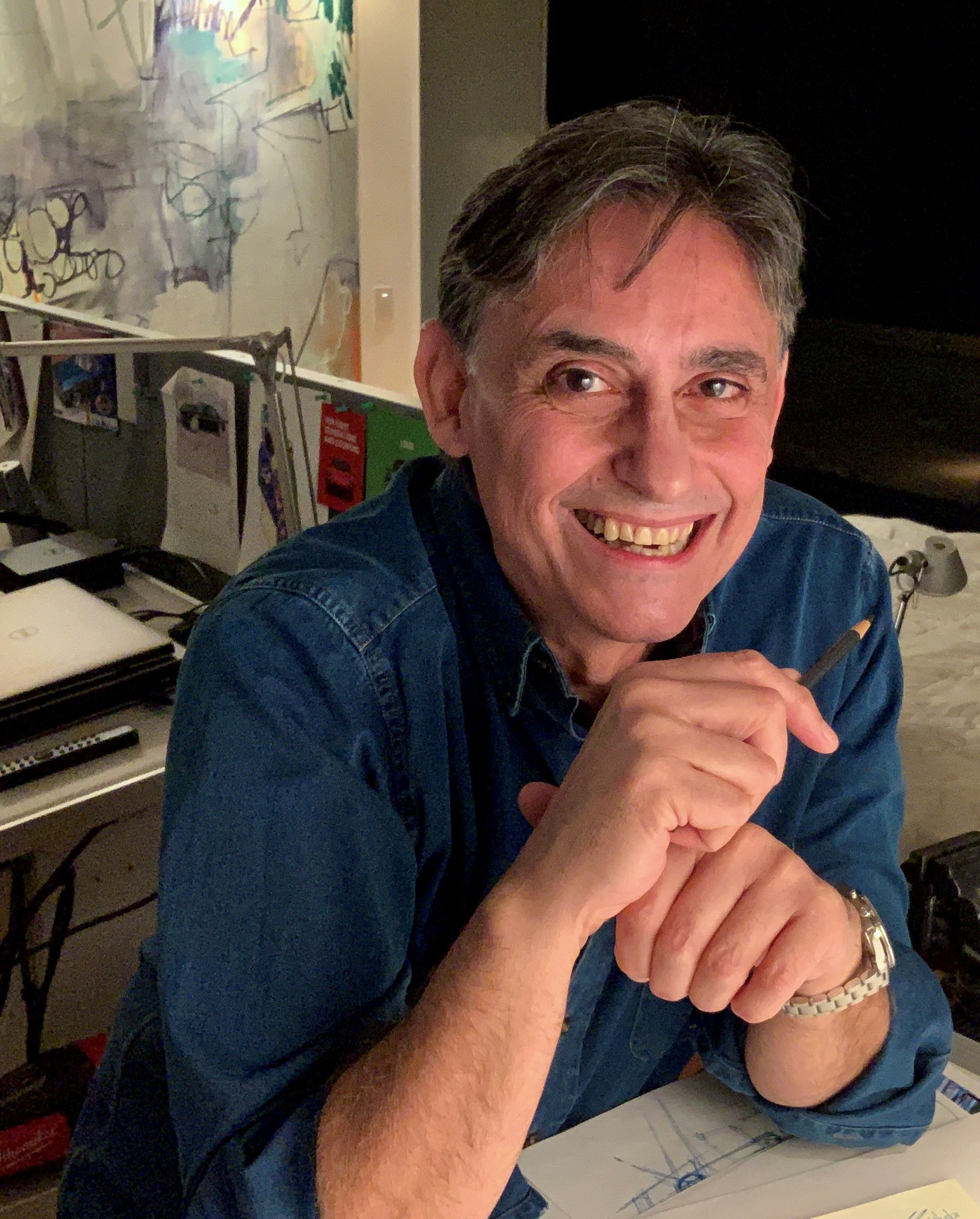
- Born: Havana, Cuba
- Other name: Jorge Alfredo Gomez Marth
- Occupation: Designer
- Known for: Pinball, video games, toys

George Gomez is an industrial designer, video game designer, and pinball designer who has worked for Bally, Williams, and Stern Pinball, among other companies. He has designed or contributed to several notable games, including Tron (1982), NBA Fastbreak (1997), and Monster Bash (1998).

== Biography ==
Gomez received a degree in industrial design in the late 1970s, influenced by his interest in drawing and making things as a child.

Gomez began his career in game design at Bally Midway in 1978. He worked on the team that created the Tron video game, and headed the team that created Spy Hunter. In 1984, after the 1983 video game crash, he left Midway to invent toys at the consulting firm Marvin Glass & Associates.

Gomez is the inventor of numerous toys, including Tonka's "Splash Darts" and Galoob's "Crash-N-Bash".

After Glass, Gomez worked on projects through the contract manufacturer Grand products, including the Battletech Centers and several Sega, Jaleco and Taito coin op video games of the late '80s. In 1993 he became a designer at Williams Electronics and designed several notable pinball machines including Monster Bash and was one of the lead developers of the Pinball 2000 system.

After Williams closed their pinball division, Gomez re-joined Midway Games heading Xbox and PlayStation game development teams. Gomez was one of key designers of the street basketball video game series NBA Ballers. While at Midway he became a consultant designer to Stern Pinball; during this time he designed several games, including The Lord of the Rings, Batman the Dark Knight, Playboy and The Sopranos. In July, 2011 he joined Stern Pinball as EVP/ Chief Creative Officer, responsible for all of the company's product development efforts. He was inaugurated into the amusement industry hall of fame in 2025.

== Arcade video games ==
(incomplete list)

- Blue Shark (1978)
- Designed the joystick for Gorf (1981), which was used on numerous other Bally arcade games
- Satan's Hollow (1982)
- Tron (1982)
- Discs of Tron (1983) (including design of the "environmental cabinet")
- Spy Hunter (1983)

== Console video games ==
- NBA Ballers: Chosen One (2008), Midway Games, Inc.
- NBA Ballers: Phenom (2006), Midway Games, Inc.
- NBA Ballers (2004), Midway Games, Inc.

== Pinball ==
- Corvette (1994)
- Johnny Mnemonic (1995)
- NBA Fastbreak (1997)
- Monster Bash (1998)
- Revenge From Mars (1999)
- Playboy (2002)
- The Lord of the Rings (2003)
- The Sopranos (2005)
- Batman- The Dark Knight (2007)
- Transformers (2011)
- The Avengers (2012)
- Batman 66 (2016)
- Spider-Man The Pin (2017) (consumer game)
- Supreme (2017) (Private Label)
- The Beatles (2018)
- Deadpool (2018)
- Star Wars Pin (2019) (consumer game)
- James Bond 007 (2022)
- Pokemon by Stern Pinball (2026)
