= Elvira and the Party Monsters =

1989 pinball machine

- Manufacturer: Midway
- Release date: October 1989
- System: Williams System 11B
- Design: Dennis Nordman, Jim Patla
- Programming: Mark Penacho
- Artwork: Greg Freres
- Music: Chris Granner
- Sound: Chris Granner
- Voices: Cassandra Peterson (Elvira)
- Production run: approximately 4000

Elvira and the Party Monsters is a 1989 pinball machine designed by Dennis Nordman and Jim Patla and released by Midway (under the Bally label). It features horrorshow-hostess Elvira. It was followed in 1996 by Scared Stiff and in 2019 by Elvira's House of Horrors, both also designed by Nordman with art by Greg Freres.

== Design ==
Most of the game was designed by Dennis Nordman, but after a motorcycle accident near the end of the design stage, Jim Patla completed it.

The game is a combination of three game ideas:

1. Monster Mash, with dancing Boogie men was conceived of by Dennis Nordman when he observed finger puppets with dancing arms at Halloween in 1984.
2. Greg Freres conceived of Party Monster as a follow-up to Party Animal which had released in 1987.
3. Roger Sharpe, working as Williams marketing director, thought of using Elvira as a theme

The marketing slogan "Elvira is No Cheap Date!" referring to the new .50/.75/1.00 pricing scheme. Elvira and the Party Monsters was manufactured shortly after the merger of Williams and Bally. Although the game uses a vaguely Bally-style cabinet and flippers, all the rest of the game hardware are completely made up of Williams parts. The machine uses a System 11B CPU and associated board setup. It includes rubber bogeyman characters and coffins that open during play.

=== Backglass design ===
The games designers are shown on the backglass, with Dennis Nordman as the werewolf, and Jim Patla as Dracula.

The arms of the creature from Creature from the Black Lagoon are shown on the backglass, three years before the Creature from the Black Lagoon pinball machine. I (heart) Smarkie is on the backglass in reference to Elvira's husband Mark Pierson; this was added at the request of Elvira when first shown a prototype of the machine.

== Reception ==
At the AMOA 1989 awards, Elvira and the Party Monsters won the best in show award.

== Digital versions ==
This pinball machine was included in the Atari Lynx game Pinball Jam alongside Police Force.

Elvira and the Party Monsters was available as a licensed table of The Pinball Arcade for several platforms until the loss of the Williams license in 2018.

The table released for Pinball FX on October 16, 2025 with optional enhancements including Elvira sitting in a cauldron. A review found this version to be authentic to the original.
