= The Simpsons Pinball Party =

2003 pinball machine

- flyer
- Manufacturer: Stern Pinball
- Release date: January 2003
- System: Stern WhiteStar
- Design: Keith P. Johnson, Joe Balcer
- Programming: Keith P. Johnson, Dwight Sullivan
- Artwork: Kevin O'Connor, Margaret Hudson
- Mechanics: Wesley Chang, Ray Tanzer
- Music: Dan Forden
- Sound: Chris Granner
- Voices: Dan Castellaneta, Nancy Cartwright, Hank Azaria

The Simpsons Pinball Party is a 2003 pinball game released by Stern Pinball. Released in January 2003, it has been noted for its complex game play and lasting popularity.

== Content ==
The Simpsons Pinball Party is based on the animated sitcom The Simpsons that airs on Fox. The game has received positive and negative feedback for one of the most complex rule sheets designed for a pinball machine, featuring the ability to stack various modes and multi-balls on top of each other. Reaching the "Super Duper Mega Extreme Wizard Mode" requires an unusually large number of shots and only a few people have ever reached it. It is noted for its theme integration as well as a second-level playfield and total of five flippers.

== Development and release ==
The game is the successor to the first Simpsons pinball game, entitled The Simpsons, which was released by Data East Pinball (the predecessor to Stern Pinball) in 1990. It was aimed at Stern Pinball's core demographic, players in their 20s and 30s. In 2007, Stern Pinball president Gary Stern said in an interview with License! that more than a decade later, "we started to manufacture a totally new game, The Simpsons Pinball Party. We coordinated with Fox and The Simpsons folks who did the art for the game, as well as the actors who voiced the speech heard during gameplay. We then made an initial production run, totaling thousands." At the time, Stern was manufacturing between 8,000 and 10,000 machines per year. Nancy Cartwright, Hank Azaria and Dan Castellaneta recorded original audio to accompany gameplay.

The design team was made up of Keith Johnson and Joe Balcer, while Johnson and Dwight Sullivan coded the game. Regarding the development process Johnson reflected that, "In the last 12 years, both pinball and The Simpsons have come a long way, and it was my goal to design a game that illustrates that perfectly. Casual players will be attracted to the Simpsons license and the compelling gadgets. Regular players will be astounded by the sheer amount of things to do and accomplish on the game. I think players of all kinds will be drawn in and find the game satisfying regardless of their skill level."

The pinball game was released in 2003. On February 12, 2003 Stern Pinball brought machines to The Simpsons' 300th episode celebration at the Santa Monica Civic Auditorium. According to Stern Pinball, the game is one of their "largest and most successful titles." Michael Jackson, Slash, and Jason Sudeikis have all owned machines. Gary Stern noted of the original Simpson's pinball machine, "We first licensed The Simpsons for pinball in the early '90s, when we were Data East Pinball. While we export about one-third of our games, that first model did especially well in the U.S." By comparison, The Simpsons television show had reached a much larger audience when Stern released their machine and saw larger overseas sales. In 2006, Stern Pinball used some of the same parts and boards to make an arcade game, Simpsons Kooky Carnival. In 2024, Gary Stern commented that he had no plans to modify or re-release The Simpsons Pinball Party because it was already perfect.

playfield

== Gameplay ==
The game is controlled with five flippers. It includes seven TV modes. During one of the modes, control of the flippers is reversed, with the left button controlling the right flipper and vice versa.

== See also ==
- List of Stern Pinball machines
