= Elvira's House of Horrors =

2019 pinball machine

- Manufacturer: Stern
- Release date: September 2019
- System: Stern SPIKE 2 System
- Design: Dennis Nordman
- Programming: Lyman Sheats
- Artwork: Greg Freres
- Mechanics: Win Schilling, Bob Brown, Joe Loveday
- Sound: Jerry Thompson
- Voices: Cassandra Peterson (Elvira), Tim Kitzrow
- Dots/Animation: Chuck Ernst, Danai Kittivathana, Joshua Clay, Paul Chamnankit
- Production run: 1,149+

Elvira's House of Horrors is a 2019 pinball game designed by Dennis Nordman and released by Stern. It is the third pinball machine to feature horror show-hostess Elvira. It is the follow-up to Bally's 1996's machine Scared Stiff, which was itself a follow-up to Bally's 1989's machine Elvira and the Party Monsters. Both of those machines were also designed by Nordman with art by Greg Freres.

One of the machines was retained by Cassandra Peterson for use in her office.

== Description ==
As with the other machines in the series, the game has a B-movie horror theme featuring Elvira. It has a color LCD mounted in the backbox of the machine, underneath the backglass. It is used to display clips from several classic horror films (à la Movie Macabre), clips of Elvira herself, animations specific to the game, and the status of gameplay. The concept is that Elvira has purchased a large house dirt cheap and it is haunted.

Custom voice calls were recorded for the game by Cassandra Peterson. In addition to clips from it is the first Stern pinball machine to include custom recorded video, all of which feature Elvira. Several characters were voiced by Tim Kitzrow, including a vampire. Clips from 26 films are used.

== Gameplay ==
The goal is to clear out the house, return each ghost to the film they originated from, and sell it for the maximum amount of money (points) you can.

== Release ==
Five different editions of the machine have been produced by Stern. Initially, 3 were available: Premium, Limited, and Signature. Unlike most Stern machines of the period, no Pro model was produced as this was not a cornerstone machine. The Premium Edition, which is the base model, had no production cap and total production numbers have not been released as of 2026. Production of the Limited Edition was capped at 400 units. Production of the Signature Edition was capped at 50 units. In 2021, a 40th Anniversary Edition was released to commemorate the first television appearance of Elvira in 1981. Production was capped at 199 units. In 2023, the Blood Red Kiss Edition was released. Production was capped at 500 units. As of 2026, all editions that had production caps are sold out.

== Reception ==
Pinballmag found the game to have simple satisfying shots, and praised the mansion. The complexity of the game rules was noted as a weakness.
