= Scared Stiff (pinball) =

1996 pinball machine

- Manufacturer: Midway
- Release date: September 1996
- System: Midway WPC-95
- Design: Dennis Nordman, Mark Weyna
- Programming: Mike Boon, Cameron Silver
- Artwork: Greg Freres
- Mechanics: Win Schilling, Bob Brown, Joe Loveday
- Sound: Paul Heitsch, Dave Zabriskie
- Voices: Cassandra Peterson (Elvira)
- Dots/Animation: Adam Rhine, Brian Morris
- Production run: 4,028

Scared Stiff is a 1996 pinball game designed by Dennis Nordman and released by Midway (under the Bally label), featuring horror show-hostess Elvira. It is the follow-up to 1989's Elvira and the Party Monsters. A third machine in the series, 2019's Elvira's House of Horrors was released by Stern. Both machines were also designed by Nordman with art by Greg Freres.

== Description ==
The game features a B-movie horror theme. Players have to go through the Six Tales Of Terror to level up the Stiff-o-meter. These are: Eyes Of The Bony Beast, Terror From The Crate, the Stiff In The Coffin, the Monster's Lab, Night Of The Leapers, and the Return Of The Deadheads. The interactive backbox contains a player controlled spinning spider. It is used to collect unique features and start special modes. Scared Stiff uses the DCS Sound System.

Scared Stiff was exhibited at the 1996 AMOA show in Dallas, with Cassandra Peterson present in her Elvira identity to promote the game.

When Scared Stiff was introduced in 1996, it was designed to have moving rubber boogieman figures mounted over the slingshots. These were designed to move forward with the kicker each time the ball hit the slingshot. The game's ROM also allowed for the boogiemen to 'dance' to the music during the Boogie Man Boogie mode by kicking with the music. Very late in production, this feature was removed because the figures' arms were thought to eventually break off. An opening between the feet of the slingshot plastics is still present on all production machines, as well as an entry in the game's manual about the feature. Additionally, the code in the machine's ROM supports the feature. Because of this, many hobbyists have added the boogiemen figure modifications to their machines.

Before the game released, mid-1996 layoffs at Williams included Dennis Nordman; Greg Freres referenced this on the backglass, calling one of the books "Black Thursday".

The faces on the stiff-o-meter on the playfield are the teachers from the art designer, Greg Freres, elementary school.

Some deadheads were designed that were not included in the final game.

== Gameplay ==
The game includes "six tales of terror".

== Digital versions ==
Scared Stiff was released in 2012 as a licensed table of The Pinball Arcade for several platforms until its delisting on June 30, 2018.

It released for Pinball FX on October 16, 2025 and included optional enhancements. This version includes all the dialogue from the original. A review found it retained the difficulty of the physical machine after The Pinball Arcade version was too easy.
