= Spider-Man (pinball) =

2007 pinball machine

- 2007 version
- Manufacturer: Stern Pinball / Steve Ritchie Productions
- Release date: June 2007
- System: Stern S.A.M. System
- Design: Steve Ritchie
- Programming: Lyman F. Sheats Jr.
- Artwork: Kevin O'Connor, Mark Galvez, Margaret Hudson, Marc Schoenberg
- Mechanics: John Rotharmel, Mike Redoble, Rob Blakeman
- Music: Dave Thiel
- Sound: Dave Thiel
- Production run: 3,760 (standard edition); 500 (Black edition)

Spider-Man is a pinball machine designed by Steve Ritchie and manufactured by Stern Pinball that was first released in June 2007. The table encompasses all three films in Sam Raimi's Spider-Man trilogy, which in turn were based on the prior comics and television series. The machine is designed by Steve Ritchie and programmed by Lyman Sheats. In addition to the standard version a "Black" edition was produced at the same time, limited to 500 machines.

== Game details ==
The goal of the table is to defeat the villains from all three movies: Green Goblin from Spider-Man, Doctor Octopus from Spider-Man 2, and Sandman and Venom from Spider-Man 3. When all four villains are defeated twice, the Battle Royale mode can be played.

=== Features ===
There are detailed, vibrant toys of each of the four villains on the playfield with an associated shot:

- Doctor Octopus' magnet that simulates a "Fusion Malfunction" by holding the ball.
- Green Goblin hovering on his glider above Pumpkin Bomb targets.
- Venom's ramp that quickly feeds the ball back to the left flipper.
- Sandman's whirlwind of targets and a motor three-bank at the center of the playfield; and much amazing multi-ball action.

The game includes a centre post between the flippers, the first since 1995's Jack-Bot.

J. K. Simmons, the actor who played J. Jonah Jameson in the Spider-Man films, also recorded additional lines of custom speech appropriate for the pinball game, such as "Extra ball", "Jackpot", and "Way to go, kid, you won a free game."

Vault Edition playfield

== Reception ==
The table was popular with players, and Pinball News in their extensive two part review particularly praised the layout, art, and music, rating these aspects at 9/10. It was considered beginner friendly. In addition to recording audio for the game, J. K. Simmons owned a Spider-Man machine.

== Legacy ==
In 2016, the game was remanufactured as part of Stern's "Vault" series of re-releases, this time with all the movie elements of the machine replaced with an Ultimate Spider-Man-based theme. The models were re-sculpted, and new voices and sound effects were added. Two additional music tracks were added to the score of the original version.

Venom was released by Stern Pinball in 2023.
