= Cassandra Peterson =

American actress, author, comedian, television host, dancer and singer (born 1951)

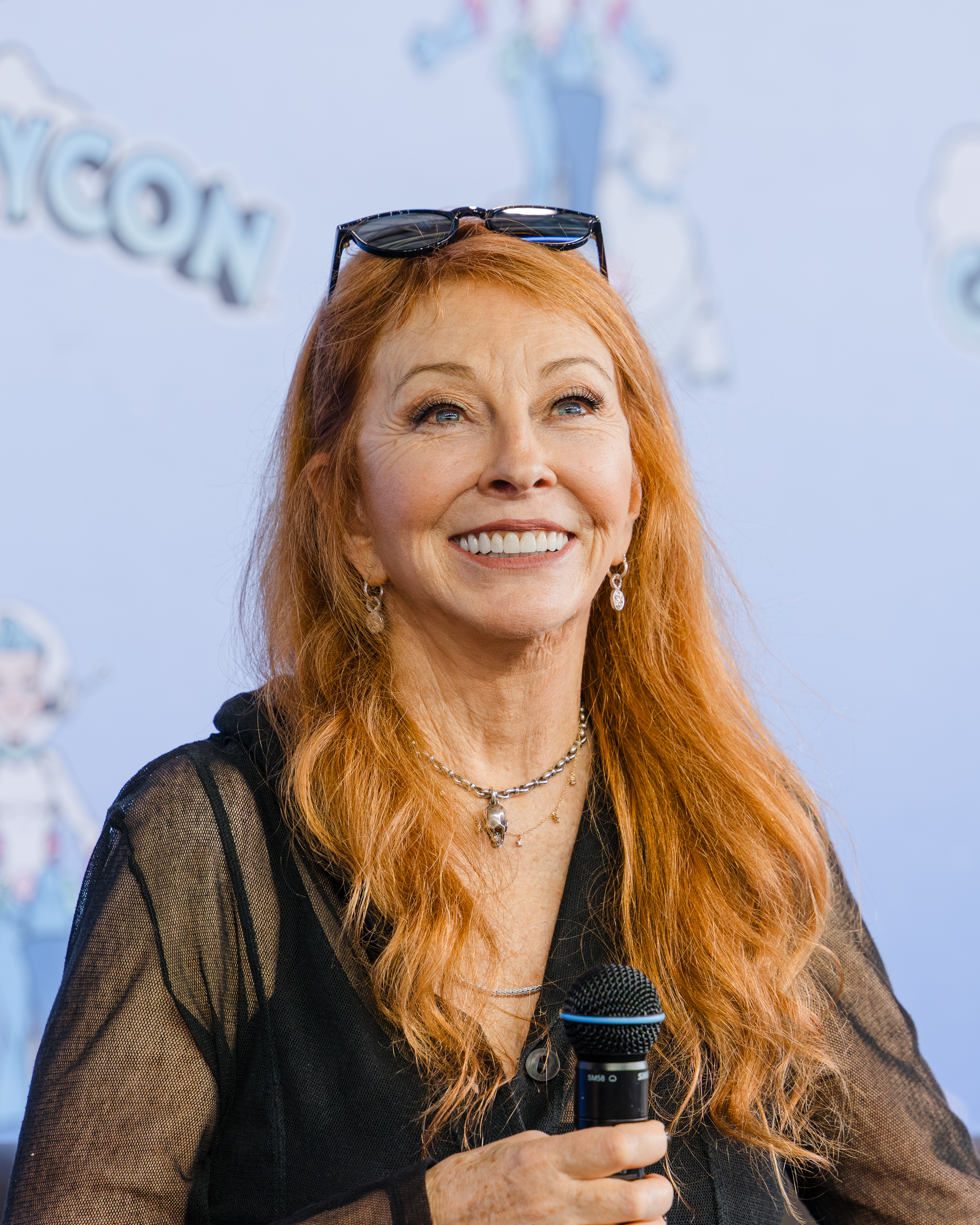
- Peterson at GalaxyCon Nashville in 2026
- Born: Cassandra Peterson; September 17, 1951 (age 75); Manhattan, Kansas, U.S.
- Occupations: Actress; writer; comedian; television personality; author; dancer; singer
- Years active: 1970–present
- Works: Full list
- Spouse: Mark Pierson (m. 1981; div. 2003)
- Partner: Teresa Wierson (2002–present)
- Children: 1
- Website: elvira.com

Cassandra Gay Peterson (/kəˈsɑːndrə ˈpiːtɜːrsən/ kuh-SAHN-druh; born September 17, 1951) is an American dancer, actress, comedian, writer, television personality, and singer. She is best known for her portrayal of the horror hostess character Elvira, Mistress of the Dark. Peterson gained fame on Los Angeles television station KHJ-TV in her stage persona as Elvira, hosting Elvira's Movie Macabre, a weekly B movie presentation. A member of the Los Angeles-based improvisational and sketch comedy troupe the Groundlings, Peterson based her Elvira persona in part on a "Valley girl"-type character she created while a member of the troupe.

The popularity of Elvira's Movie Macabre led to the 1988 film Elvira: Mistress of the Dark, and later the 2001 film Elvira's Haunted Hills, both starring Peterson as Elvira. The television show was revived in 2010, featuring Elvira hosting public domain films, and airing on This TV until 2011. Elvira returned as a horror hostess in 2014 with 13 Nights of Elvira, a 13-episode series produced by Hulu, and again in 2021 for a one-night, four-part 40th-anniversary special on Shudder.

Peterson has made cameo appearances as Elvira in a number of films and television programs, including appearing as a guest commentator during WrestleMania 2 and as a guest judge on RuPaul's Drag Race, The Boulet Brothers' Dragula, and Halloween Wars. She also had a cameo in Pee-wee's Big Adventure.

== Early life ==
Peterson was born on September 17, 1951, in Manhattan, Kansas. When she was a toddler, she was scalded by boiling water, which required skin grafts to cover over 35% of her body to heal, resulting in her having to spend three months in the hospital. Her family relocated to Colorado Springs, Colorado, where her mother and aunt operated a costume shop.

In a 2011 interview, Peterson stated that, as a child, she was more fascinated by horror-themed toys while other girls were occupied with Barbie dolls. In elementary school, she watched House on Haunted Hill, which was the first horror film she ever saw. She trained in ballet. During her teens, Peterson worked as a drag queen go-go dancer in a Colorado Springs gay bar and as a go-go dancer at Club A-Go-Go, a nightclub in Colorado Springs, and for soldiers at Fort Carson. She graduated from Palmer High School in Colorado Springs.

She cited among her early comic influences Phyllis Diller, Totie Fields and Anne Meara.

== Career ==
=== Early career ===
Inspired by Ann-Margret in the film Viva Las Vegas, while on a trip to Las Vegas, Nevada, during high school, she persuaded her parents to let her see a live show where she was noticed by the production staff; despite being only 17 years old, she persuaded her parents to let her sign a contract. Immediately after graduating high school, she drove back to Las Vegas, where she became a showgirl in Frederic Apcar's pioneering "Vive Les Girls!" at the Dunes; there, she met Elvis Presley, with whom she went on a date. She played a topless dancer in the film The Working Girls (1974).

In the early 1970s, Peterson moved to Italy and became lead singer of the Italian rock bands Latins 80 and The Snails. After being introduced to film director Federico Fellini by the producer of a documentary on Las Vegas showgirls in which she had appeared, she landed a small part in the film Roma (1972). When she returned to the United States, she worked at the Playboy Club in Miami as a showgirl in the 1973 revue Fantasies of Love au Naturel and later signed up with Hugh Hefner's Playboy Modeling Agency, working as a hostess and model. She also toured nightclubs and discos around the country with a musical/comedy act, Mama's Boys.

In her 2021 memoir Yours Cruelly, Elvira, she writes "Perhaps the biggest mistake I made in my twenties was posing nude for a husband-and-wife photography team, who bullshitted me into doing what they said was a 'test shoot' for Penthouse magazine. They guaranteed me it would never be seen anywhere publicly." She adds "I never saw or heard from them again, and as far as I knew, that was the end of that... until 1981 when I became famous. Those photos, pubic hair and all, appeared in every sleazy men's magazine on the stand and there wasn't a damn thing I could do about it." Peterson also appeared in several adult magazines in the 1970s, including Modern Man, Playgirl, and Swank, among others.

In 1979, she joined the Los Angeles-based improvisational troupe the Groundlings, where she created a Valley girl-type character upon whom the Elvira persona is largely based. In the 1980s, she left the Groundlings ensemble.

Peterson was one of two finalists for the role of Ginger Grant for the third Gilligan's Island television movie in 1981 but was dropped before filming. Shortly after that, KHJ-TV offered her the horror host position.

=== Elvira ===
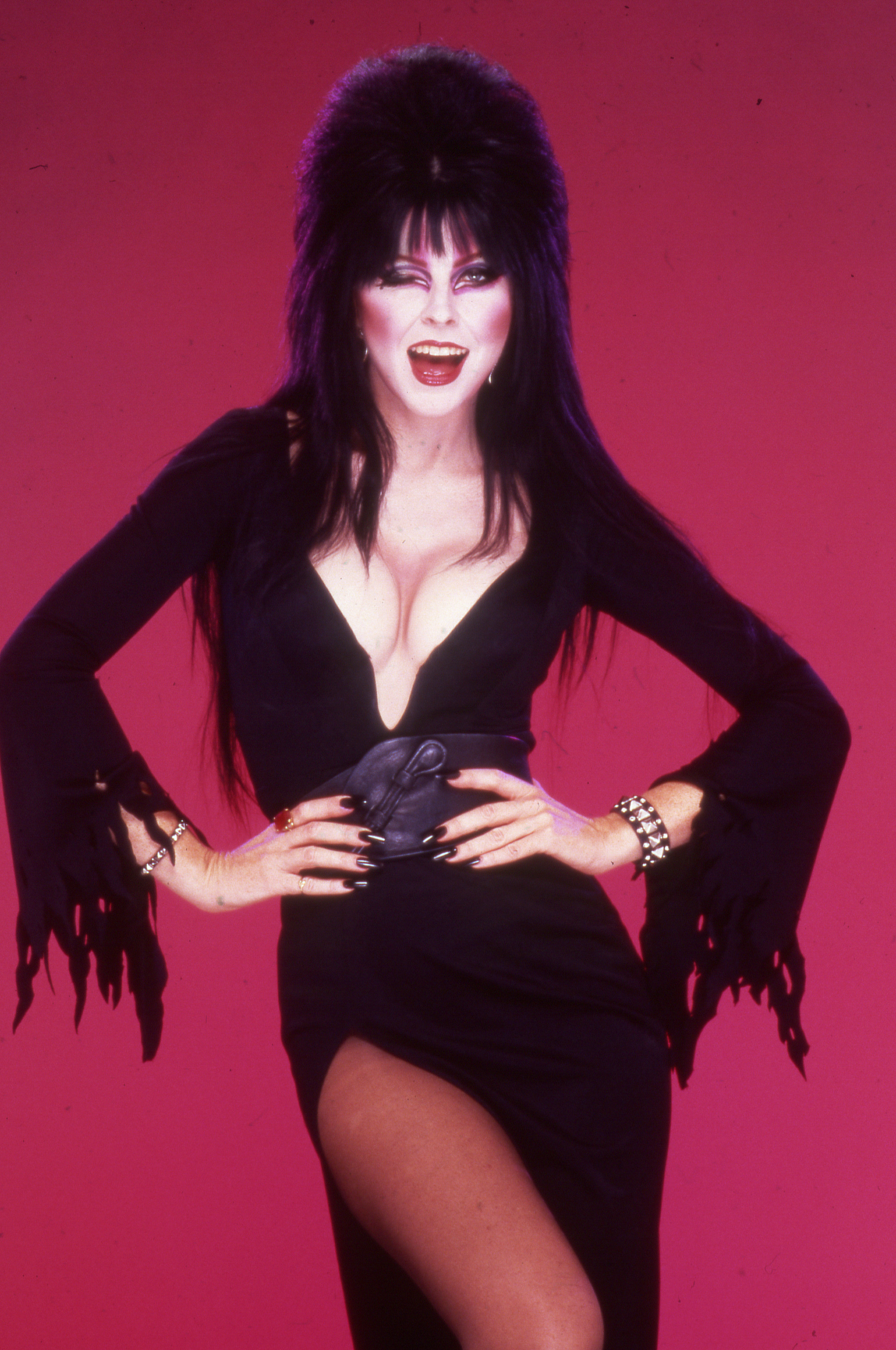
Peterson dressed as Elvira in 1984

In 1981, six years after the death of Larry Vincent, who starred as host Sinister Seymour of a Los Angeles weekend horror show called Fright Night, show producers began to bring the show back.

The producers decided to use a hostess. They asked 1950s' horror hostess Maila Nurmi to revive The Vampira Show. Nurmi worked on the project for a short time, but quit when the producers would not hire Lola Falana to play Vampira. The station sent out a casting call, and Peterson auditioned and won the role. Producers left it up to her to create the role's image. She and her best friend, Robert Redding, came up with the sexy goth/vampire look after producers rejected her original idea to look like Sharon Tate's character in The Fearless Vampire Killers. They created the Elvira look by drawing inspiration from a Kabuki makeup book and the hairstyles of The Ronettes.

Shortly before the first taping, producers received a cease and desist letter from Nurmi. Besides the similarities in the format and costumes, Elvira's closing line for each show, wishing her audience "Unpleasant dreams," was notably similar to Vampira's closer: "Bad dreams, darlings..." uttered as she walked off down a misty corridor. The court ruled in favor of Peterson, holding that "'likeness' means actual representation of another person's appearance, and not simply close resemblance." Peterson claimed that Elvira was nothing like Vampira aside from the basic design of the black dress and black hair. Nurmi claimed that Vampira's image was based on Morticia Addams, a character in Charles Addams's cartoons that appeared in The New Yorker magazine.

Peterson's Elvira character rapidly gained notice with her tight-fitting, low-cut, cleavage-displaying black gown. Adopting the flippant tone of a California "Valley girl", she brought a satirical, sarcastic edge to her commentary. She reveled in dropping risqué double entendres and making frequent jokes about her cleavage. In an AOL Entertainment News interview, Peterson said, "I figured out that Elvira is me when I was a teenager. She's a spastic girl. I just say what I feel and people seem to enjoy it." Her camp humor, sex appeal, and good-natured self-mockery made her popular with late-night movie viewers and her popularity soared. The character became so popular that Rod Temperton first suggested Elvira to perform the rap in Thriller, before Quincy Jones suggested Vincent Price.

The Elvira character soon evolved from an obscure cult figure to a lucrative brand. She has been associated with many products through the 1980s and 1990s, including Halloween costumes, comic books, action figures, trading cards, pinball machines, Halloween decor, model kits, calendars, perfume and dolls. She has appeared on the cover of Femme Fatales magazine five times. In 1984, she hosted her own six-hour Halloween special on MTV, which included skits and music videos and returned to host another four-hour Halloween special in 1986. That same year, she also was a guest commentator at Wrestlemania 2 in the Los Angeles segments alongside Jesse Ventura and Lord Alfred Hayes. Elvira's popularity reached its zenith with the release of the 1988 feature film Elvira: Mistress of the Dark, on whose script Peterson collaborated with John Paragon and Sam Egan. From 1989 through 1991, Peterson appeared as Elvira in a series of commercials promoting World Championship Wrestling's annual Halloween Havoc pay-per-view events.

In 1993, she filmed a pilot for CBS called The Elvira Show. An expansion of the 1988 film with a sitcom setting, the premise had Elvira and her family moving into a new neighborhood with her older aunt and dealing with nosy neighbors and uptight conservatives who all want them to move out. It also starred Katherine Helmond, Phoebe Augustine, Cristine Rose, Ted Henning, Lynne Marie Stewart, Claudette Wells, John Paragon, Laurie Faso, and Basil Hoffman. It was not picked up by a TV network.

After several years of attempts to make a sequel to Elvira: Mistress of the Dark, Cassandra and her manager and then-husband Mark Pierson decided to finance a second movie. In November 2000, Peterson wrote, again in collaboration with Paragon, and co-produced Elvira's Haunted Hills. The film was shot in Romania for just under one million dollars. With little budget left for promotion, Cassandra and Mark screened the film at AIDS charity fund raisers across America. For many people in attendance, this was their first opportunity to see the woman behind the Elvira character. On July 5, 2002, Elvira's Haunted Hills had its official premiere in Hollywood. Elvira arrived at the premiere in her Macabre Mobile. The film was later screened at the 2003 Cannes Film Festival.

In September 2010, Elvira's Movie Macabre returned to television syndication, this time with public domain films. In October 2014, it was revealed that a new series of thirteen episodes had been produced, 13 Nights of Elvira for Hulu. The show premiered on October 19, 2014, running through to Halloween.

In an interview with Josh Korngut on Dread Central's Development Hell podcast, Peterson revealed cancelled plans for an Elvira "buddy comedy" where the Mistress of the Dark took a road-trip to hell. She also detailed plans for an Edward Scissorhands–inspired animated feature film revealing Elvira's origins with the holiday of Halloween.

As of September 2018, Peterson was working to develop a direct sequel to 1988's Elvira: Mistress of the Dark, as well as an animated Elvira project.

=== Elvira on home video ===
Peterson partnered with International Video Entertainment (IVE) to host 24 installments of the horror home video series ThrillerVideo. Released in 1985, many of these movies were hand-selected by Peterson, including The Monster Club and Dan Curtis television films, as well as many episodes of the Hammer House of Horror television series. (Peterson avoided the more explicit cannibal, slasher, and zombie films of the time, so the remainder of the series lacks Elvira hosting.)

Rhino Home Video released Elvira's Midnight Madness series in 1990 and 1991.

The DVD collection Elvira's Box of Horrors was released in 2004, marking Elvira's return to film hosting after a ten-year absence.

=== Non-Elvira career ===
Peterson has also portrayed non-Elvira roles in many other films, most notably Pee-wee's Big Adventure in 1985 alongside friend and fellow Groundling Paul Reubens, who starred as his Pee-wee Herman character; Echo Park in 1986, starring Tom Hulce, Susan Dey, and Cheech Marin; Allan Quatermain and the Lost City of Gold, released in 1987, which starred Richard Chamberlain and Sharon Stone; and 2010's All About Evil, as a mother named Linda Thompson who says not to go to the old theater to watch scary movies. Peterson also appeared in Rob Zombie's The Munsters movie in 2022 and R.L. Stine's Pumpkinhead 2 (2026).

== Personal life ==
In the 1970s, Peterson had a liaison with Jon Voight, as well as with Robert De Niro during the filming of The Godfather Part II. She revealed in 2008 that she had lost her virginity to singer Tom Jones, calling the experience "painful and horrible". In her memoir, she accused the late basketball player Wilt Chamberlain of raping her during a party at his Bel Air mansion in the 1970s.

Peterson married musician Mark Pierson in 1981, and he soon became her personal manager. They had one daughter. They divorced in 2003.

Peterson released her memoir, Yours Cruelly, Elvira: Memoirs of the Mistress of the Dark, on September 21, 2021. She revealed in the book that she has been in a relationship with a woman, Teresa "T" Wierson, since 2002. They began their romantic relationship following Peterson's separation from her husband.

Peterson identifies as sexually fluid, though she also accepts "pansexual" as a label.

Peterson was a vegetarian for many years; as of 2021, she continues to maintain a "mostly vegetarian" diet consisting mostly of organic food. She maintains a "toned...down" regimen of yoga, pilates and physical activity for self-care, and reduced her previous heavy drinking to a more moderate level.

In 2025, Peterson protested against the role of Elon Musk in the Trump Administration by having the words "Elon Sux" added to the side of her Tesla. After circulating a video of herself driving it around Portland she posed in front of it with a chainsaw and donated the vehicle to National Public Radio as a fundraiser.

Peterson indicated she had stopped portraying Elvira in character by 2025, stating that she could no longer wear the outfit convincingly at her age: "people really don't want to see Elvira be 90 years old." She has continued to manage, franchise and merchandise the Elvira brand, under the premise that Elvira had become a mythical character that transcended Peterson and could now be adapted to media without her physically present; she compared Elvira's presence on Halloween to be akin to Santa Claus on Christmas.

== Discography ==
Peterson recorded several songs and skits for her Elvira Halloween albums in the 1980s and 1990s:

- Elvira and the Vi-Tones: 3-D TV: "3-D TV (Three-Dimensional)" b/w "Elvira's Theme" (Rhino Records 1982)
- Elvira Presents Vinyl Macabre: Oldies but Ghoulies (Volume 1) (Rhino Records 1983)
- Elvira Presents Haunted Hits (Rhino Records 1987)
- Elvira Presents Monster Hits (Rhino Records 1994)
- Elvira Presents Revenge of the Monster Hits (Rhino Records 1995)
- Elvira's Gravest Hits (Shout! Factory 2010)

She also performed on a track called "Zombie Killer" for the band Leslie and the LY's, released in February 2008. The music video for the track features Leslie and the LY's performing to a sold-out audience of zombies in a fictional venue called "Elvira Stadium". A 7" single was released. In 2018, she collaborated with singer Kim Petras on the title track of Petras' EP Turn Off the Light, Vol. 1 and subsequent mixtape Turn Off the Light.

== Published books ==
- Elvira; Paragon, John (1996). Elvira: Transylvania 90210. Penguin Publishing Group. ISBN 9781572971790.
- Elvira; Paragon, John (1997). Elvira: Camp Vamp. Penguin Publishing Group. ISBN 9781572972261.
- Peterson, Cassandra; Paragon, John (1997). Bad Dog, Andy: A Parody. General Publishing Group. ISBN 1575440377.
- Elvira; Paragon, John (1998). The Boy Who Cried Werewolf. Berkley Boulevard Books. ISBN 9780425164907.
- Peterson, Cassandra (2014). Elvira, Mistress of the Dark. Tweeterhead. ISBN 9780692678183.
- Peterson, Cassandra (2021). Yours Cruelly, Elvira: Memoirs of the Mistress of the Dark. Hachette. ISBN 9780306874352.
- Peterson, Cassandra (2025). Elvira's First Book of Monsters. Running Press. ISBN 9780762489190.
- Peterson, Cassandra (2025). Elvira's Cookbook from Hell. Hachette. ISBN 9780306832864.

== Awards and nominations ==
=== Awards ===
- Rondo Hatton Classic Horror Awards
  - 2011: Favorite Horror Host
  - 2017: Monster Kid Hall of Fame
- Silver Lake Film Festival
  - 2001: Spirit of Silver Lake Award
- Hollywood Horrorfest
  - 2018: Vincent Price Award
- RuPaul's Drag Race
  - 2024: Giving Us Lifetime Achievement Award

=== Nominations ===
- Saturn Awards
  - 1988: Best Actress – Elvira: Mistress of the Dark
- Golden Raspberry Awards
  - 1988: Worst Actress – Elvira: Mistress of the Dark

== See also ==
- Midnight movie
