= Mortal Kombat (film series) =

Film series based on video game franchise

- Official film series logo
- Directed by: Paul W. S. Anderson (1); John R. Leonetti (2); Simon McQuoid (3–4)
- Based on: Mortal Kombat by: Ed Boon; John Tobias
- Distributed by: New Line Cinema (1–2); Warner Bros. Pictures (3–4)
- Release dates: August 18, 1995 (1); November 21, 1997 (2); April 23, 2021 (3); May 8, 2026 (4)
- Country: United States
- Language: English
- Budget: Total (4 films) $185 million
- Box office: Total (4 films) $387.9 million

Mortal Kombat is an American series of martial arts fantasy films based on the video game series of the same name.

The first film, Mortal Kombat, was released in 1995 and its sequel, Mortal Kombat Annihilation, was released in 1997. After the two films, game publisher Midway filed for bankruptcy. Warner Bros. Pictures, having become the parent of New Line Cinema in 2008 (after over a decade of both operating as separate divisions of Time Warner), made a bid to purchase most of Midway's assets, including Mortal Kombat. In June 2009, Kasanoff and Threshold sued in bankruptcy court, arguing that they owned the copyright to many of the characters from the series.

On July 1, 2009, the bankruptcy court approved the sale of most of Midway's assets to Warner Bros. subject to the intellectual property claims of Threshold Entertainment. After years of development hell, a reboot of the series was released in April 2021.

== Films ==
=== Animated ===
Film	U.S. release date	Director(s)	Screenwriter(s)	Producer(s)
Original
Mortal Kombat: The Journey Begins	April 11, 1995	Joseph Francis	Kevin Droney	Alison Savitch & Lawrence Kasanoff
Reboot series (Legends)
Mortal Kombat Legends: Scorpion's Revenge	April 14, 2020	Ethan Spaulding	Jeremy Adams	Rick Morales
Mortal Kombat Legends: Battle of the Realms	August 31, 2021	Ethan Spaulding	Jeremy Adams	Jim Krieg & Rick Morales
Mortal Kombat Legends: Snow Blind	October 11, 2022	Rick Morales	Jeremy Adams	Jim Krieg
Mortal Kombat Legends: Cage Match	October 17, 2023	Ethan Spaulding	Jeremy Adams	Jim Krieg

==== Mortal Kombat: The Journey Begins (1995) ====
On April 11, 1995, New Line Home Video, Turner Home Entertainment and Threshold Entertainment released a tie-in animated film on VHS and Laserdisc, titled Mortal Kombat: The Journey Begins. Serving as a prequel to the in-development 1995 feature film, it follows the protagonists Liu Kang, Johnny Cage and Sonya Blade as they travel on a mysterious boat to the Mortal Kombat tournament. On the way they meet Raiden, who provides them with some hints about how to survive the tournament and defeat Shang Tsung and his army of Tarkatan minions. Upon arriving at the island where the battles takes place, Raiden retells the origins of Shang Tsung, Goro, Scorpion, Sub-Zero and the Great Kung Lao in between fight scenes.

The film featured a combination of traditional animation, motion capture, and CGI to explain the origins behind some of the movie's main characters, as well as a fifteen-minute behind-the-scenes documentary of the theatrical release. Trailers of the film were seen on the promotional screener VHS copy, and on other VHS releases from Turner Home Entertainment and New Line Home Video. The film was included on the Mortal Kombat Blu-ray released in April 2011.

==== Mortal Kombat Legends: Scorpion's Revenge (2020) ====
A direct-to-video animated film called Mortal Kombat Legends: Scorpion's Revenge was released by Warner Bros. Animation on digital April 14, 2020, and on Blu-ray, DVD, and 4K Ultra HD on April 28. The film is directed by Ethan Spaulding and written by Jeremy Adams. The voice cast includes Patrick Seitz as Scorpion, Steve Blum as Sub-Zero, Darin De Paul as Quan Chi, Jordan Rodrigues as Liu Kang, Joel McHale as Johnny Cage, & Jennifer Carpenter as Sonya Blade. Kevin Michael Richardson also reprises his role of Goro from the 1995 live action film. The film's premise centers around Scorpion seeking revenge on those who murdered his family and clan, after being resurrected by Quan Chi, while Liu Kang, Johnny Cage, and Sonya Blade are chosen to participate in the Mortal Kombat tournament to save Earthrealm from Outworld.

==== Mortal Kombat Legends: Battle of the Realms (2021) ====
A sequel, entitled Mortal Kombat Legends: Battle of the Realms, with most of the cast and crew from Scorpion's Revenge, was released on August 31, 2021.

==== Mortal Kombat Legends: Cage Match (2023) ====
In an interview in October 2022, Jeremy Adams revealed that he was writing the 4th Mortal Kombat Legends film. It serves as a prequel to Scorpion's Revenge.

=== Live-action ===
Film	U.S. release date	Director(s)	Screenwriter(s)	Story by	Producer(s)
Original series
Mortal Kombat	August 18, 1995	Paul W. S. Anderson	Kevin Droney	Kevin Droney	Lawrence Kasanoff
Mortal Kombat Annihilation	November 21, 1997	John R. Leonetti	Bryce Zabel & Brent V. Friedman	John Tobias, Joshua Wexler & Lawrence Kasanoff	Lawrence Kasanoff
Reboot series
Mortal Kombat	April 23, 2021	Simon McQuoid	Greg Russo & David Callaham	Greg Russo & Oren Uziel	James Wan, Todd Garner, Simon McQuoid & E. Bennett Walsh
Mortal Kombat II	May 8, 2026	Simon McQuoid	Jeremy Slater	Jeremy Slater	James Wan, Todd Garner, Toby Emmerich, Simon McQuoid & E. Bennett Walsh
Mortal Kombat 3	TBA	TBA	Jeremy Slater	Jeremy Slater	TBA

=== Original series ===
==== Mortal Kombat (1995) ====
Three unknown martial artists are summoned to a mysterious island to compete in a tournament whose outcome will decide the fate of the world.

==== Mortal Kombat Annihilation (1997) ====
A group of martial arts warriors have only six days to save the Earth from an extra-dimensional invasion.

=== Reboot series ===
==== Mortal Kombat (2021) ====
A washed-up mixed martial arts fighter named Cole Young is unaware of his hidden lineage or why Lin Kuei assassin Sub-Zero is hunting him down. Concerned for the safety of his family, he seeks out a clique of fighters that were chosen to defend Earthrealm against Outworld.

==== Mortal Kombat II (2026) ====
Following the events of Mortal Kombat, Lord Raiden tasks Earthrealm champions to find new warriors to prepare the upcoming tournament against Outworld, with one such recruit being a Hollywood martial artist, Johnny Cage.

==== Mortal Kombat 3 (TBA) ====
In October 2025, during New York Comic Con, it was reported that a third film was in development, with Jeremy Slater returning as screenwriter.

== Cast and crew ==
=== Recurring cast and characters ===
List indicators

This section includes characters who will appear or have appeared in more than two films in the series.

- An empty grey cell indicates the character was not in the film, or that the character's official presence has not yet been confirmed.
- ^{A} indicates an appearance through archival footage or audio.
- ^{U} indicates an uncredited appearance.
- ^{V} indicates a voice-only role.
- ^{Y} indicates a younger version of the character.

Characters		Animated films					Live-action films			
Characters		Mortal Kombat: The Journey Begins	Mortal Kombat Legends				Mortal Kombat	Mortal Kombat Annihilation	Mortal Kombat	Mortal Kombat II
Characters		Mortal Kombat: The Journey Begins	Scorpion's Revenge	Battle of the Realms	Snow Blind	Cage Match	Mortal Kombat	Mortal Kombat Annihilation	Mortal Kombat	Mortal Kombat II
Characters		1995	2020	2021	2022	2023	1995	1997	2021	2026
Liu Kang		Randy Hamilton	Jordan Rodrigues	Jordan Rodrigues	Statue		Robin Shou	Robin Shou	Ludi Lin	Ludi Lin
Sonya Blade		Jennifer Hale	Jennifer Carpenter	Jennifer Carpenter			Bridgette Wilson	Sandra Hess	Jessica McNamee	Jessica McNamee
Johnny Cage		Jeff Glen Bennett	Joel McHale	Joel McHale		Joel McHale	Linden Ashby	Chris Conrad	Pictured	Karl Urban Indy Urban^{Y}
Raiden		Ron A. Feinberg	Dave B. Mitchell	Dave B. Mitchell	Pictured	Dave B. Mitchell	Christopher Lambert	James Remar	Tadanobu Asano	Tadanobu Asano
Hanzo Hasashi Scorpion		Ed Boon^{U}	Patrick Seitz	Patrick Seitz	Patrick Seitz		Chris Casamassa Ed Boon^{V}^{U}	J. J. Perry Ed Boon^{V}	Hiroyuki Sanada	Hiroyuki Sanada Ed Boon^{V}^{U}
Kuai Liang	Sub-Zero	Jim Cummings		Bayardo De Murguia	Ron Yuan			Keith Cooke		
Bi-Han	Sub-Zero	Jim Cummings	Steve Blum				François Petit		Joe Taslim	Joe Taslim
Shang Tsung		Jim Cummings	Artt Butler	Artt Butler	Artt Butler		Cary-Hiroyuki Tagawa	Cary-Hiroyuki Tagawa^{A}	Chin Han	Chin Han
Goro		Ron A. Feinberg	Kevin Michael Richardson				Tom Woodruff Jr.^{U} Kevin Michael Richardson^{V}^{U} Frank Welker^{V}^{U}		Angus Sampson	
Kitana			Grey DeLisle	Grey DeLisle			Talisa Soto	Talisa Soto		Adeline Rudolph Sophia Xu^{Y}
Jax Briggs			Ike Amadi	Ike Amadi			Gregory McKinney	Lynn Red Williams	Mehcad Brooks	Mehcad Brooks
Shao Kahn			Fred Tatasciore	Fred Tatasciore			Frank Welker^{U}	Brian Thompson	Pictured	Martyn Ford
Shinnok			Robin Atkin Downes	Robin Atkin Downes		Robin Atkin Downes		Reiner Schöne	Pictured	
Quan Chi			Darin De Paul							Damon Herriman
Kano			Robin Atkin Downes		David Wenham		Trevor Goddard		Josh Lawson	Josh Lawson
Kung Lao		Appeared		Matt Yang King					Max Huang	Max Huang
Jade				Emily O'Brien				Irina Pantaeva		Tati Gabrielle
Cyrax				Artt Butler				J. J. Perry		
Smoke				Matthew Mercer				Ridley Tsui		
Reiko				Robin Atkin Downes					Nathan Jones	
Kabal					Keith Silverstein				Daniel Nelson Damon Herriman^{V}	
Reptile			Appeared				Keith Cooke Frank Welker^{V}	Keith Cooke^{A}	CGI	
Chan Kang (Note: Chan Kang does not appear in the video games, as he was an original character created specifically for the first live-action film.)							Steven Ho	Steven Ho^{A}		
Sindel								Musetta Vander		Ana Thu Nguyen
Mileena								Dana Hee	Sisi Stringer	
Baraka								Dennis Keiffer		CJ Bloomfield
Cole Young (Note: Cole Young does not appear in the video games, as he was an original character created specifically for the 2021 live action film, named as an Anglicisation of "Kuai Liang".)									Lewis Tan	Lewis Tan
Harumi Hasashi									Yukiko Shinohara	Yukiko Shinohara^{A}

=== Crew ===
Occupation	Film			
Occupation	Mortal Kombat	Mortal Kombat Annihilation	Mortal Kombat	Mortal Kombat II
Director(s)	Paul Anderson	John R. Leonetti	Simon McQuoid	Simon McQuoid
Producer	Lawrence Kasanoff	Lawrence Kasanoff	James Wan; Todd Garner; Simon McQuoid; E. Bennett Walsh	James Wan; Todd Garner; Toby Emmerich; E. Bennett Walsh; Simon McQuoid
Writer(s)	Kevin Droney	Screenplay by Bryce Zabel; Brent V. Friedman; Story by John Tobias; Joshua Wexler; Lawrence Kasanoff	Screenplay by Greg Russo; David Callaham; Story by Greg Russo; Oren Uziel	Jeremy Slater
Composer	George S. Clinton	George S. Clinton	Benjamin Wallfisch	Benjamin Wallfisch
Director(s) of photography	John R. Leonetti	Matthew F. Leonetti	Germain McMicking	Stephen F. Windon
Editor(s)	Martin Hunter	Peck Prior	Scott Gray; Dan Lebental	Stuart Levy
Production company(s)	Threshold Entertainment	Threshold Entertainment	New Line Cinema; Atomic Monster; Broken Road Productions	New Line Cinema; Atomic Monster; Broken Road Productions; Fireside Films
Distributor(s)	New Line Cinema	New Line Cinema	Warner Bros. Pictures	Warner Bros. Pictures

== Reception ==
=== Box office performance ===
Film	U.S. release date	Box office revenue			Budget	Reference
Film	U.S. release date	United States	International	Worldwide	Budget	Reference
Original series
Mortal Kombat	August 18, 1995	$73,000,000	$51,741,822	$122,195,920	$18 million	
Mortal Kombat Annihilation	November 21, 1997	$35,927,406	$15,449,455	$51,376,861	$30 million	
Reboot series
Mortal Kombat	April 23, 2021	$42,201,013	$41,400,000	$83,601,013	$55 million	
Mortal Kombat II	May 8, 2026	$79,579,103	$49,500,000	$129,079,103	$80 million	
Total		$230,707,522	$158,091,277	$388,798,799	$183 million	

=== Critical and public response ===
Film	Rotten Tomatoes	Metacritic	CinemaScore
Mortal Kombat	44% (77 reviews)	60 (13 reviews)	A–
Mortal Kombat Annihilation	4% (52 reviews)	11 (12 reviews)	C+
Mortal Kombat Legends: Scorpion's Revenge	90% (21 reviews)		
Mortal Kombat	55% (300 reviews)	44 (43 reviews)	B+
Mortal Kombat Legends: Battle of the Realms	50% (6 reviews)		
Mortal Kombat II	64% (187 reviews)	46 (35 reviews)	B

== Music ==
Title	U.S. release date	Length	Performed by	Label
Mortal Kombat: Original Motion Picture Soundtrack	August 15, 1995	68:28	Various Artists	TVT
Mortal Kombat: Original Motion Picture Score	October 11, 1995	42:01	George S. Clinton	Rykodisc
Mortal Kombat Annihilation: Original Motion Picture Soundtrack	October 28, 1997	72:08	Various Artists	TVT
Mortal Kombat: Original Motion Picture Soundtrack	April 16, 2021	79:37	Benjamin Wallfisch	WaterTower Music
Mortal Kombat II (Original Motion Picture Soundtrack)	May 1, 2026	97:00	Benjamin Wallfisch	WaterTower Music

== Novelizations ==
A novelization of the first movie by "Martin Delrio" (James D. Macdonald and Debra Doyle) was released through Tor Books. It is based on an early version of the film's script, and as such it includes several deleted or unfilmed scenes, such as a fight between Sonya Blade and Jade.
