= Kung Lao =

Mortal Kombat character

- Mortal Kombat character
- Kung Lao artwork by John Tobias for Mortal Kombat 3 (1995)
- First appearance: Mortal Kombat II (1993)
- Created by: Ed Boon; John Tobias
- Designed by: John Tobias (MKII, MK3); Luis Mangubat (MK:D)
- Voiced by: Various: Joshua Y. Tsui (MKG); Joe Yau (MK:SM); Jin Hyong (MK9); Will Yun Lee (MKX); Sunil Malhotra (2019–present); Matthew Yang King (2021 animated film)
- Portrayed by: Paolo Montalban (television); Mark Dacascos (web series); Max Huang (2020s films)
- Motion capture: Various: Anthony Marquez (MKII, MK3); Joshua Y. Tsui (MKG); Joe Yau (MK:SM); Tian Shuai (MK11); Noah Fledler (MK1)

In-universe information
- Species: Human/revenant
- Weapon: Razor-rimmed hat
- Family: Great Kung Lao (ancestor); Kung Jin (relative)
- Origin: China

Kung Lao (Chinese: 空佬) is a character in the Mortal Kombat fighting game franchise by Midway Games and NetherRealm Studios. He debuted in Mortal Kombat II (1993) as a Shaolin monk and close friend of series protagonist Liu Kang, and his trademark characteristic is his wide razor-brimmed hat that he uses as a weapon. Kung Lao is depicted as one of the series' primary heroes, including being the secondary protagonist of the action-adventure spin-off Mortal Kombat: Shaolin Monks (2005).

Outside of the games, Kung Lao has appeared in various related media. Reception to the character has been generally positive, particularly in respect to his appearance, special abilities, and Fatality finishing moves.

== Character design and gameplay ==
As stated in Kung Lao's bio card that after the first Mortal Kombat game, the creators wanted a monk character other than Liu Kang. According to Mortal Kombat co-creator John Tobias, Kung Lao's hat was inspired by the 1964 James Bond movie Goldfinger, in which the villain Oddjob threw his derby hat as a deadly weapon. Kung Lao was portrayed by Anthony Marquez in Mortal Kombat II and Mortal Kombat 3; Ed Boon said Marquez was ”one of the best martial artists we worked with." Liu and Kung Lao were meant to complement each other. One as the present day chosen one and the other as a reflection of a failed past, yet it was their sense of righteous purpose that bonded their friendship.

Kung Lao can be seen in Mortal Kombat II, Mortal Kombat 3, and Shaolin Monks wearing the Chinese character 武 which means military/wu shu/martial arts. However, when asked about this character, John Tobias stated that it is Chinese for "war".

Kung Lao's attacks are based on wind-type moves. His most notable attack is the Hat Toss, which could be directed in Mortal Kombat II, but could not be directed since Mortal Kombat Gold, until Mortal Kombat (2011). Many of his Fatalities involve the use of his hat to some extent, such as slicing the body in half and decapitation.

According to Prima Games, Kung Lao is one of the cheapest Mortal Kombat characters, where they observe "He can combo almost any jumping attack into his Dive Kick. He even has multiple projectile attacks, one of which he can aim up or down, meaning you can't reliably crouch under or jump over it. In Mortal Kombat 3, he even had one of the longest dial-a-combos, because his damage clearly wasn't high enough already."

== Appearances ==
=== Mortal Kombat games ===
==== Midway games ====
Introduced in Mortal Kombat II (1993), Kung Lao is one of the last known descendants of the Great Kung Lao, a Mortal Kombat champion who lost the title and his life to the Shokan Prince Goro 500 years previously, resulting in the start of corrupt sorcerer Shang Tsung's rule over the tournament. Kung Lao was originally chosen to represent the Shaolin in the Mortal Kombat tournament, but he declined due to the consequences of becoming champion. When a portal leading to the otherworldly dimension Outworld is opened and the Shaolin temple is attacked by Baraka and his Tarkatan soldiers, Liu Kang and Kung Lao resolve to travel through the portal themselves and avenge their fallen Shaolin brothers. Kung Lao's ultimate goal however was to rebuild the White Lotus Society at the Wu Shi Academy in order to train a new generation of warriors for the coming ages. Following Liu Kang's victory over the Outworld tyrant Shao Kahn, the monks return to Earth and begin training the next generation of Shaolin warriors. When Shao Kahn invades Earthrealm in Mortal Kombat 3 (1995), Kung Lao temporarily scraps his plans for reforming the White Lotus Society. While he faces the Kahn in battle, he is ultimately defeated and presumed dead.

In Mortal Kombat Gold (1999), Kung Lao had faked his death so he can live a life of peace in respect to the beliefs of his ancestors. However, he is drawn away from his newfound peace to help fight against the fallen Elder God Shinnok's forces when word reaches him that Goro is still alive. Kung Lao attacks Goro with a ceremonial strike of vengeance for the Great Kung Lao's death. With this act, the two warriors shake hands, ending their conflict.

In Mortal Kombat: Deadly Alliance (2002), Kung Lao vows revenge for Liu Kang's death at the hands of the title sorcerers. Along the way, Kung Lao seeks out advice and training from Outworld martial arts teacher Bo' Rai Cho. Kung Lao is killed by Deadly Alliance and then were resurrected by the dragon king Onaga to become his slaves in Mortal Kombat: Deception (2004). He and the rest of his brainwashed allies were later released from Onaga's spell by a partially resurrected Liu Kang and reformed ninja Ermac. In Mortal Kombat: Armageddon (2006) describes Kung Lao joins forces with him to bring their former comrades Raiden and Liu Kang under control, with the God of Thunder becoming "as ruthless as Shao Kahn" and Liu Kang's corpse selectively slaying various people.

In the action-adventure game Mortal Kombat: Shaolin Monks (2005), an alternate depiction of the events between the first and second Mortal Kombat games, Kung Lao's character was explored to a greater degree than had been shown in previous titles. In this game, he is portrayed as feeling almost resentful of Liu Kang's victory in the Shaolin tournament. A rivalry between the two monks was hence established for the first time. As the two fighters defeated Shang Tsung's warriors, they formed a race of sorts to become the Mortal Kombat champion. This rivalry escalated until the two warriors become convinced that the other has been corrupted by Outworld.

==== NetherRealm games ====
In the rebooted continuity of Mortal Kombat (2011), Raiden receives foreboding visions from his future self and attempts to change the timeline of events that lead to Armageddon. He allows Kung Lao to fight in the second tournament. Kung Lao defeats Shang Tsung, Quan Chi, and the Shokan Kintaro, but he is killed by Shao Kahn. Following Shao Kahn's failed invasion of Earthrealm, Kung Lao is resurrected as one of Quan Chi's undead revenant slaves. Kung Lao returns in Mortal Kombat X (2015), continuing to serve Quan Chi and Shinnok in the Netherrealm.

In Mortal Kombat 11 (2019), past iterations of Kung Lao and Liu Kang are brought to the present due to the machinations of the keeper of time Kronika. After learning the Shaolin Temple was attacked by Kronika's forces, the monks head out to investigate, only to encounter their revenant selves and fail to stop Kronika's henchman Geras from stealing vials of Earthrealm's lifeforce. They later help Kitana defeat Shao Kahn and lead the surviving Shaolin monks alongside the combined Earthrealm/Outworld armies in assaulting Kronika's Keep while their revenants attempt to stop them.

In Mortal Kombat 1, the Kung Lao from Liu Kang's new timeline was born and raised in the village of Fengjian, where he worked in the fields alongside his childhood friend, Raiden. In one of his intros with Liu Kang, the Great Kung Lao's victory is revealed to be hidden from the Earthrealm's public at the said ancestor's behest. After the two were trained in martial arts by Madam Bo, Liu Kang recruits them to be defenders of Earthrealm in the tournament against Outworld alongside Johnny Cage and Kenshi. The fight with Sub-Zero Liu Kang set up to test him also inspired him to develop his razor-sharp hat. After Raiden becomes Earthrealm's champion and wins the tournament for them, Liu Kang sends the remaining warriors to investigate Shang Tsung. To prevent Titan Shang Tsung from destroying his timeline, Liu Kang summons Titan incarnations of Kitana, Kung Lao, and Raiden to assist him. After Shang Tsung's Titan counterpart is defeated, Kung Lao becomes an instructor at the Wu Shi Academy, with Shujinko becoming one of his first students. Due to Kung Lao not teaching him humility, Shujinko became a threat to the realms before Liu Kang erased his memories. Kung Lao agreed to train him again, but with Raiden's help.

=== Other media ===
Kung Lao was absent from the 1990s Mortal Kombat feature films, with the producers of the 1995 film opting to combine his character with that of Liu Kang, in turn making Liu the descendant of The Great Kung Lao. Series co-creator John Tobias said in a 2021 interview that this decision "caus[ed] confusion in our games for years to follow" and "was a mistake." Kung Lao appeared in a supporting role in the 2021 Mortal Kombat reboot film as one of Raiden's chosen Earthrealm defenders, but he is killed late in the film by main antagonist Shang Tsung. (Note: When Kung Lao is introduced, Liu Kang addresses him as shī xiōng (师兄), which means a senior male student studying under the same master, but the film's English subtitles translate it as "cousin". Actor Ludi Lin (Liu Kang) clarified that the relationship between the two was more of a "found family" one as they are unrelated by blood, while "cousin" could be considered a term of endearment for a close friend.) He was played by Max Huang, a former member of the Jackie Chan Stunt Team. Huang reprises the role in the sequel Mortal Kombat II (2026), where he is resurrected as a revenant and brainwashed by Quan Chi into fighting against Earthrealm. After mortally wounding Raiden, he battles Liu Kang in the tournament, who reluctantly kills him once more before vowing to find a way to bring him back.

Kung Lao appeared in the first and last episodes in the 2013 second season of the web series Mortal Kombat: Legacy, and was played by Mark Dacascos.

Matthew Yang King voiced Kung Lao in the 2021 animated film Mortal Kombat Legends: Battle of the Realms, a retelling of the first Mortal Kombat tournament in which he is again one of Earthrealm's chosen warriors to compete, but he is ultimately killed in battle by Shao Kahn.

Kung Lao was the main protagonist of Jeff Rovin's 1995 Mortal Kombat novel that featured an original story set before the events of the 1992 game. In Malibu Comics' Mortal Kombat comic series that ran from 1994 to 1995, his backstory is altered in that he is an exile in Outworld due to the failure of his ancestor and the fall of his lineage. He debuts in the sixth and final issue of the 1994 Blood & Thunder miniseries when he rescues a near-death Liu Kang after the latter is severely wounded by Kano, and in the 1995 Battlewave miniseries, he joins with Kitana, Baraka and Sub-Zero in an attempt to overthrow the Outworld emperor Shao Kahn. He lastly featured in a July 1995 one-shot, Rising Son, which depicted his battle against Shang Tsung and his shapeshifting mind tricks.

In the 1998 syndicated television series Mortal Kombat: Conquest, The Great Kung Lao (played by Paolo Montalban) is one of the show's main protagonists alongside original characters Siro (Daniel Bernhardt) and Taja (Kristanna Loken). After becoming Grand Champion, the thunder god Raiden tells Kung Lao that, because he was the last defending warrior of Earthrealm, he is now destined to train new warriors to compete against Shao Kahn's forces for the next Mortal Kombat. The series ran for one season of 22 episodes.

== Reception ==
Kung Lao has received generally positive critical reception and often cited as one of the best fighters from the franchise. Kung Lao and Liu Kang's team ups were praised with IGN saying they made the series "at its best" whenever they joined forces. Gavin Jasper of Den of Geek wrote that Kung Lao "was easily one of the most fun to play and carried a unique style," but criticized his story as being less influential than the rest of the cast when it comes to moving the plot

Some critics have condemned the Mortal Kombat series racist, especially regarding its Asian characters. Guy Aoki, the president of the advocacy group Media Action Network for Asian Americans, rebuked Mortal Kombat II in 1994 for allegedly perpetuating existing stereotypes of Asians as martial arts experts including Kung Lao, Liu Kang, among others. Allyne Mills, publicist for the game's publisher Acclaim Entertainment, answered: "This is a fantasy game, with all different characters. This is a martial arts game which comes from Asia. The game was not created to foster stereotypes." The characters' racial diversity and the inclusion of female characters were also criticized by the psychologists Patricia Marks Greenfield and Rodney R. Cocking in their 1996 book Interacting with Video, writing they "cannot assume that this greater diversity represents a more progressive identity politics, for one could argue that it merely increases the racist and sexist potential of the individual fights." In his 2022 book Mortal Kombat: Games of Death, David Church noted Kung Lao among Mortal Kombat II's "nonwhite upper-tier characters" while exploring the topic of racial stereotyping in fighting games.

The character's finishing moves have been positively received throughout his series appearances. with Jeff Gerstmann of GameSpot finding his original "Hat Split" Fatality from Mortal Kombat II was a classic move. Moreover, K. Thor Jensen of UGO called it one of the most gruesome finishing move in video games, and Complex ranked it fifth in their listing of the "50 Craziest Video Game Fatalities". while Den of Geek rated the finisher among the best from MKII, praising both the animation and gore. Meanwhile, Kung Lao's "Buzzsaw" Fatality was considered among the best from the 2011 reboot game, and was cited as a factor in the game being banned in Australia. Mortal Kombat co-creator Ed Boon commented that it was "probably the most painful-looking Fatality ever made".

Reception to Kung Lao's alternate-media depictions has been generally positive. Jesse Schedeen of IGN sin that in MK Legacy, Dacascos' performance stands out positively but lamented the season season "kept the focus more squarely on Liu Kang and Kung Lao throughout." Screen Rant wrote that "standout performances" such as Dacascos' were "undermined slightly by stilted deliveries from some of the extras that flesh out flashback scenes." Carl Lyon of Fearnet similarly praised casting of Kung Lao and conversely felt the character was "woefully underused" in the series.

Gene Park of The Washington Post said that Kung Lao "makes one of the more exciting debuts" in the 2021 Mortal Kombat film, adding that that while he was an appealing mentor, the narrative poorly treats him especially with his highly gory death scene. Jeffrey Harris of 411Mania wrote that supporting characters like Kung Lao were "marginalized at the price of serving the contrived journey of discovery for [main protagonist] Cole Young", and while Huang was "not great" in the role, he and Ludi Lin (Liu Kang) "show[ed] enough that the movie probably should have been about them". Wesley Yin-Poole of Eurogamer and lamented the poor handling of the Shaolin Monks. Rosie Knight of Nerdist praised the strong bond the two monks share. Max Huang stated enjoyed the inclusion of Kung Lao thanks as he believes it was due to his relationship with Liu Kang. In regards to Battle of the Realms IGN panned the poor handling of the character especially because he does not have interactions with Liu Kang. In general, Sam Stone of Comic Book Resources noted the character's deaths in both the animated and live-action films released in the same year made the character more of a plot device to show the risk the heroes are facing.
