= Kung Jin =

Mortal Kombat character

- Mortal Kombat character
- Kung Jin in Mortal Kombat X (2015)
- First appearance: Mortal Kombat X (2015)
- Created by: NetherRealm Studios
- Designed by: Justin Murray
- Voiced by: Johnny Yong Bosch
- Portrayed by: Lewis Tan (Mortal Kombat X: Generations)
- Motion capture: Lawrence Kern

In-universe information
- Weapon: Bow and arrow
- Origin: China

Kung Jin is a character in the Mortal Kombat fighting game franchise by NetherRealm Studios. He debuted in Mortal Kombat X (2015) as a Shaolin archer and relative of fellow Shaolin Kung Lao who joins a new generation of heroes defending Earth from evil otherworldly forces. Kung Jin wields a bow and arrow system for melee and projectile attacks.

The character is the first male LGBT fighter of the Mortal Kombat series, and has received significant media attention and discussion about the representation of LGBT characters in fighting games in general.

== Concept and design ==
Kung Jin was introduced in Mortal Kombat X preview trailers and gameplay streams in March 2015. According to developer NetherRealm Studios, his creation was the result of the company wanting both an archer character and a relative of Kung Lao in the series. His main costume was inspired by Mongolian nomadic archers, with him wearing it as a symbol of his acceptance of his role as a hero. (Note: "Kung Jin is the black sheep of his family. Rather than becoming a monk like Kung Lao, he breaks away and becomes a thief, living on his own by his wits and his bow. His look is inspired by the nomadic archers of Mongolia with layers of leather, fur, and rough woven fabrics making up his costume. He wears his prime costume ... when he's accepted his role as hero, so he looks more like a warrior than a thief. ... Once we knew that he needed a magical bow we designed something more substantial than could be used as either a staff or a bow.")

Kung Jin was confirmed as the series' first gay character on social media by Dominic Cianciolo, NetherRealm Studios' story and voiceover director. Although this was not explicitly stated in Mortal Kombat X, dialogue in the game's story mode alluded to Kung Jin's sexuality during a conversation between him and Raiden, where the latter convinces him to continue the legacy of his kinsmen who were Shaolin monks. Kung Jin expresses his fear of the Shaolin not accepting him for who he is, but Raiden reassures him by responding, "They care only about what is in your heart. Not whom your heart desires." A pre-match introduction sequence between Kung Jin and Tanya also hinted at his lack of interest in members of the opposite sex.

Evan Narcisse of Kotaku wrote of Kung Jin's gameplay, "His moveset favors the style I tend to enjoy most when playing fighting games: quick strikes with options for keeping opponents away."

== Appearances ==
In Mortal Kombat X (2015), Kung Jin is introduced as a descendant of the legendary Earth hero, the Great Kung Lao, and the cousin of Shaolin monk Kung Lao, who is an undead revenant corrupted by the evil Elder God Shinnok during the game's events. After Kung Lao's death, Kung Jin moved with his family to the United States and lived in poverty. He operates as a thief until Raiden convinces him to abandon his criminal activities and train with the Shaolin at their Wu Shi Academy in China. As a member of the White Lotus Society, a faction co-founded by the Shaolin Order of Light and Raiden, thunder god and immortal protector of Earth, Kung Jin fights alongside Cassie Cage's military unit in order to repel the hostile forces of Outworld and the underworld Netherrealm. He has made no other series appearances to date, but is mentioned in passing in Mortal Kombat 11 where he is established through retroactive continuity as Kung Lao's nephew.

Kung Jin appears in the twelfth and final issue of the 2015 Mortal Kombat X prequel comic miniseries published by DC Comics and set before the in-game storyline.

Lewis Tan played the character in the unreleased web series Mortal Kombat X: Generations, which was intended as a 2015 follow-up to the 2011-13 web series Mortal Kombat: Legacy.

== Critical reception ==
The revelation of Kung Jin's sexual orientation in Mortal Kombat X received coverage from media outlets. Jef Rouner from the Houston Press used the topic to express his opinion of homophobia in gaming, particularly the "obliviousness [of] the idea that including a gay character [is] bowing to political correctness." Indonesian media outlet Liputan 6 reported that overall fan reception towards the reveal had been divisive, but noted that some players believed that Kung Jin's sexuality had little relevance to their actual opinion of the character. Todd Harper of Paste described the nature of Kung Jin's presentation as an LGBT character to be "complicated", and that he had mixed feelings over the issue: on one hand, he was pleased that with Kung Jin, NetherRealm Studios made a solid effort with the respectful representation of a queer Asian man, an underrepresented demographic in popular media. On the other hand, Harper raised concerns about the potential for Kung Jin's identity to be tastefully presented in a "consistently meaningful but not overpowering" without resorting to harmful stereotyping or tropes, citing as comparison examples he considered to be troubling like Poison from the Street Fighter series.

In light of his confirmed identity as a gay man, James Kozanitis from GameRevolution ranked Kung Jin in their 2016 list of the five most memorable LGBT characters in video games. In January 2019, Ella Braidwood from Pink News reported on social media reactions towards the initial announcement of Mortal Kombat 11's roster, and noted that a substantial number of series fans wanted to see Kung Jin's return as a playable character. Jasper thought the character had potential as a "silver-tongued member of the new generation of heroes" who is driven to social banditry as a result of his sympathies with the impoverished masses and that the allusion to his sexuality in the cutscene was "really sweet, well done, and very welcome", but expressed disappointment over the character underutilization following his first appearance in Mortal Kombat X.

Sam Machkovech of Ars Technica said that Kung Jin, whose staff could be turned into a bow for cross-screen arrow action, is a good example of a character who offers a playstyle that was never seen before in a Mortal Kombat game. Gavin Jasper from Den of Geek ranked Kung Jin 52nd in their 2019 list of the series' playable characters, deeming his personality the "most boring" of Mortal Kombat X's new characters.
