= Cassie Cage =

Mortal Kombat character

- Mortal Kombat character
- Cassie Cage in Mortal Kombat 11 (2019)
- First appearance: Mortal Kombat X: Blood Ties (2015)
- First game: Mortal Kombat X (2015)
- Created by: Shawn Kittelsen
- Voiced by: Ashly Burch (MKX); Erica Lindbeck (MK11)
- Motion capture: Brenda Barrie (MKX); Christina Eenigenburg (MK11, model)

In-universe information
- Weapon: Handguns
- Origin: United States
- Nationality: American

Cassie Cage is a character in the Mortal Kombat fighting game franchise by NetherRealm Studios. She debuted in Mortal Kombat X (2015) as the daughter of martial arts actor Johnny Cage and Special Forces officer Sonya Blade. Possessing the fighting prowess of her parents, she follows their footsteps by becoming a Special Forces soldier and leading a new generation of warriors in defending Earthrealm. Cassie is featured as the main hero of Mortal Kombat X's story mode and plays a prominent role in her other appearances.

The character received a positive reception for her personality, gender representation, and Fatality finishing moves.

== Development ==
=== Characterization ===
Shawn Kittelsen is credited with creating Cassie Cage, introducing her in Mortal Kombat X: Blood Ties, a comic miniseries published by DC Comics in 2015, and set between MKX and its 2011 predecessor. Kittelsen has however stated that NetherRealm Studios had already worked on a considerable amount of the creation of the new MKX cast, and in a 2015 interview with Den of Geek, he shared: "[The] younger characters like Cassie appealed to me from a more human angle — they're badasses, but how the heck is anyone a KID in this universe? Ninja assassins, interrealm wars, the constant specter of death lurking over your shoulder. What's it like to grow up in that environment? What does all that violence do you?"

Introduced as one of four second-generation Mortal Kombat fighters, described by Wesley Yin-Poole of Eurogamer as a "quartet of daddy issue-riddled newbies", Cassie is the daughter of Johnny Cage and Sonya Blade. A teenager growing up in Los Angeles and raised in a celebrity-obsessed culture, Cassie is "kind of aware that her dad is sort of an icon of direct-to-video movies". Kittelsen added that her voice is one that would be "expect[ed] from a teenage girl who was raised to kick ass and be a fighter." Her official MK11 biography reads: "The offspring of Johnny Cage and Sonya Blade laid the smackdown on Shinnok a few years back, but even that wasn't enough to escape the shadow of her legendary parents. Whenever Cassie isn't defending Earthrealm, she's fighting to prove worthy of their legacy."

Cassie was voiced by Ashly Burch in MKX, and Erica Lindbeck in MK11.

=== Art and design ===
An early sketch by concept artist Justin Murray showed Cassie as a "robotix [sic] engineer" with spiked, pink hair and a massive hand-operated mechanical arm. Another concept depicted her as a muscular MMA-style brawler with long, pink hair and wearing a customized leather sports bra and panties, tall, black boots and fighting gloves with a personalized logo of her initials framed inside the outline of a star. Her design for the game consists of her short blonde hair, aviator sunglasses, and a full Special Forces tactical suit; the design was finalized by artist Marco Nelor, who considered Cassie among his favorite designs.

Kickboxer and mixed-martial artist Felice Herrig has claimed that physical and visual similarities between herself and the character are not coincidental. Herrig first mentioned possible similarities in a January 2015 post to her Instagram account. Later, following the April 2015 release of Mortal Kombat X, she said in an interview with Fox Sports that her camp was looking into legal options, reaffirming her belief that "Cassie Cage is 100-percent me," and added, "Who doesn't want to be a bad ass in a video game? It's definitely cool and if they would have came to me and said 'hey can we use your image and your likeness in a video game as Cassie Cage?' I would be more excited." Cassie's in-game mannerisms include blowing bubble gum and taking selfies, the latter for which Herrig is well-known. However, no legal action was ever taken.

Cassie's design in Mortal Kombat 11 features her in three new outfit variations: militaristic garb, heavy white battle armor, and a hot pink visor and track jacket, respectively. A Harley Quinn skin was later released as downloadable content. Cassie is accompanied by the combat drone BLB-118, but no longer has her baton from MKX.

=== Gameplay ===
Serving as the main character of MKX's story, Cassie is playable in the game's twelfth and final chapter, in which she fights Sindel, Kitana, and D'Vorah before battling and defeating Corrupted Shinnok.

Cassie's fighting style is similar to that of her parents; combining her father's martial arts skills and her mother's military training, she can fight with her hands in close combat and use her pistols from long range. Cassie adopts her father's attitude and her mother's combat styles. She also has the capacity to use energy-infused abilities. Like the other selectable characters in MKX, Cassie's special moves and attacks are split into three gameplay variations. Cassie's three variations are "Hollywood", "Spec Ops", and "Brawler". In the "Hollywood" variation, Cassie—like Johnny Cage—wears sunglasses during battle, adopts his groin-punch move, and uses her handguns on the ground and in mid-air. In her "Bubble Head" Fatality (a finishing move that executes defeated opponents), she shoots her opponents in both legs and once in the forehead, then removes her gum from her mouth and sticks it onto the wound, causing the gum to fill with the victim's blood before they die. In "Selfie", she knocks off her opponent's lower jaw with her nightstick, then takes a selfie image with the corpse, which she then uploads to a fictitious social media site.

Returning in Mortal Kombat 11, Cassie's movesets are further developed while retaining the blend of her parents' skills. Many of Cassie's movesets and combos from MKX were either eliminated or completely reworked. In MK11, according to Game Informer, "most of her enhanced moves, which use up the aggression meter, simply increase the damage of her special moves, instead of opening opponents up for longer combos." Cassie's "Shadow Kick" ability helps her close distance easily while her grounded moves and combos help facilitate rushdown gameplay. In addition, Cassie excels at responding with speed or creating distance from opponents. Cassie's BLB-118 combat drone enhances her more militaristic moves, with NetherRealm Studios later making changes to it in post-release game patches. In the esports scene, Cassie's MK11 version is among players' top choices, fluctuating between S and A tiers.

== Appearances ==
=== Mortal Kombat games ===
Following the defeat of evil Outworld emperor Shao Kahn at the end of the 2011 series reboot, Johnny Cage and his wife Sonya Blade see the birth of their child Cassandra Carlton Cage, shortened to "Cassie", but they later divorce. She follows in her mother's footsteps and joins the Special Forces, which uses military training and technology to protect Earthrealm from its enemies. Under Raiden's orders, Cassie leads a task force assembled by her father and composed of a new generation of combatants—Jacqui Briggs (her best friend), Takeda, and Kung Jin. Sonya does not give Cassie preferential treatment. The team gain experience as they attempt a sneak attack on Sub-Zero's Lin Kuei temple and fail, though the attack is revealed to have been a training exercise set up by Johnny. Sub-Zero tells Cassie and her unit they will fail unless they work together as a team.

Sonya sends the team to Outworld to locate Mileena, who has Shinnok's amulet. Cassie encounters the realm's new ruler Kotal Kahn, who begrudgingly allies with her unit to locate the amulet. The team recovers the amulet, but Kotal has them captured out of distrust and intended to use them to lure Raiden to Earthrealm. When the unit return to Earthrealm, they discover Johnny has been abducted by Shinnok and taken to Raiden's Sky Temple, where the fallen Elder God has corrupted the Jinsei, the source of Earthrealm's life force. With her team incapacitated or caught up in fighting Shinnok's allies, Cassie faces Shinnok alone. During the battle, she discovers she has inherited Johnny's ancient power, which increases her strength, and she defeats Shinnok before helping Raiden restore the Jinsei. Following this, Sonya, Johnny, and Cassie happily reunite.

In Mortal Kombat 11, two years after defeating Shinnok, Cassie is promoted to Commander and leads a Special Forces strike team alongside Sonya and Jacqui in assaulting the Netherrealm. While the mission was successful, Sonya gave her life to ensure Cassie and the others escaped safely. Due to a time storm caused by the keeper of time, Kronika, Cassie worked with younger versions of Johnny, Sonya, and Jax to figure out what happened. When the Black Dragon cartel and Cyber Lin Kuei warriors attacked the Special Forces headquarters, Cassie fought to keep her parents' younger selves safe, but Kano ultimately captured them. In light of the attack, Raiden transported Cassie and their remaining allies to Hanzo Hasashi's Fire Gardens to regroup. Having put a tracker on Kano's helicopter, Cassie leads the surviving Special Forces members in weakening the Black Dragon and rescuing her parents' younger selves. After Kronika kidnaps Liu Kang, Cassie took part in a joint Earthrealm/Outworld attack on Kronika's keep to rescue him. In her arcade ending, after defeating Kronika and attaining her god-like power, Cassie resurrects Sonya so she can retire peacefully and maintains her position as a Special Forces commander instead of becoming the new keeper of time.

Cassie is not present in Liu Kang's new timeline in Mortal Kombat 1, as Johnny Cage has not yet met Sonya. However, an alternate timeline Cassie appears in the final battle as one of Shang Tsung's minions summoned to oppose Liu Kang, and is killed by an alternate timeline Kitana. Another incarnation of Cassie appears in both Geras and Liu Kang's arcade endings.

=== Other media ===
Cassie is a supporting character in DC Comics' Mortal Kombat X: Blood Ties weekly prequel miniseries that is set before the in-game storyline. Her role is similar to that in the game; she aspires to establish her own identity as she follows in the footsteps of her parents. She debuts in a two-parter in the fourth and fifth chapters; she is first seen training with Jacqui when her strained relationship with Sonya is revealed. Cassie and Jacqui sneak into an underground, mixed-martial-arts arena, where Cassie is suddenly forced to fight Frost in a death match, which Cassie wins but the Black Dragon crashes the event before she can kill Frost. She and Jacqui take Frost to safety before they flee the arena, during which Cassie snaps selfies to leave a traceable trail for the Special Forces.

In the ninth chapter, Cassie and Jacqui are captives of Kano and the Black Dragon but are intercepted by Mavado and the rival Red Dragon clan in an Outworld jungle. The factions fight over custody of Cassie and Jacqui before Erron Black frees them. Mavado attacks Black and tries to kill Cassie and Jacqui, but they overpower him and Cassie kills him with his hookswords. In the twelfth chapter, Cassie and Jacqui are taken captive by Havik. Cassie is then absent from the series until chapter eighteen, where she is imprisoned in a dungeon on Shang Tsung's island and is described by Havik as "the heir to an ancient warrior power", in reference to her father Johnny Cage's lineage.

Cassie is forced to watch Skarlet assault Jacqui. Havik tells her he is capable of acquiring this power when Cage's loved ones are close to death. In her cell, Cassie is attacked by Jacqui, who is under the influence of Havik's "Blood Code" curse. Skarlet, working with Havik, stabs Cassie in the chest with a Kamidogu dagger, inflicting a curse onto her. When Sonya and Cage enter Shang Tsung's island to confront Reiko and the Red Dragon, they are presented with the brainwashed Jacqui and Cassie, who tries to kill her own parents to prove her loyalty to Reiko.

== Reception ==
The character has had a mainly positive reception, with many outlets listing her as among both the best and strongest characters in the Mortal Kombat series. Den of Geek ranked Cassie eleventh in their 2015 rating of the series' 73 playable characters, describing her as "a new main hero character who is actually likable" and "everything you'd want out of a good female protagonist and it's wonderful that NetherRealm [Studios] was able to hit the potential on such a fun character design". The publication additionally cited her in 2022 as the tenth-most powerful character in the Mortal Kombat series, albeit with "an asterisk ... because the Cage bloodline was bred and trained for the sole purpose of creating mortals who could slay gods." Wesley Yin-Poole of Eurogamer commented that Cassie's "character design, personality, and overall sass" made her stand out among the four "Kombat kids". However, according to Chris Moyse of Destructoid, "Cassie combines the best and worst features from both her parents, which is the kind of thing that only happens in movies and video games." Suriel Vazquez of Game Informer wrote that in comparison to Burch's voice work in MKX, Lindbeck's performance made Cassie sound oddly younger, "less nonchalant and more juvenile", which "seemed to hamper that cool demeanor I'd come to love about her." Vazquez was also critical of the perceived flanderization of Cassie's personality in MK11, opining that the "abrasive air about her" characterization "seems intensified to a breaking point here. Her character leans more heavily into her being a stereotypical millennial".

Cassie's appearance in MKX was lauded as a notable representation of strong female characters in video games. In 2022, Dot Esports wrote that Cassie "has been praised for her singular personality and the gender representation she embodied," and rated her among the series' five best female characters on the grounds that she "amplifies the best qualities of both [Johnny Cage and Sonya Blade]." Lucas Sullivan of GamesRadar praised the game's overall "depictions of strong women, particularly Sonya Blade, Cassie Cage, and Jacqui Briggs" as "some of the most grounded, believable, and most importantly relatable portrayals I've seen". The staff of Comic Book Resources, in 2021, placed Cassie fifth in their ranking of Mortal Kombat's 23 playable female characters, citing the impact of her series debut: "In a clear passing of the torch moment, Cassie was the one who took down this latest threat to the worlds of Mortal Kombat and took her place as someone to lead the franchise into a new era."

Cassie's "Selfie" Fatality from MKX has gained critical praise. Polygon commented, "We've become accustomed to Mortal Kombat's brand of gruesome humor over the past 20-plus years but even I had to wince at this one". Kotaku's Patricia Hernandez stated, "Yes, it's not the most brutal fatality in the game. But it is the most memorable and culturally relevant one." CraveOnline ranked it second in their selection of the game's top ten Fatalities. Comic Book Resources considered it "one of the funniest and most memorable fatalities in the game", while Den of Geek commented, "Usually something like that would come off as too corny and forced, but they go so over-the-top with it, to the point of showing a Facebook knockoff page with scrolling comments from other kombatants, that it's one of the true highlights of the new game." In 2022, GameSpot simultaneously rated "Selfie" among the ten best Fatalities in the history of the franchise, and her "I <3 You" finisher from MK11 among the series' worst.

== See also ==
- United States Army Special Forces in popular culture
