= Mortal Kombat II (film) =

2026 film by Simon McQuoid

- Theatrical release poster
- Directed by: Simon McQuoid
- Written by: Jeremy Slater
- Based on: Mortal Kombat by: Ed Boon; John Tobias
- Produced by: Todd Garner; James Wan; Toby Emmerich; E. Bennett Walsh; Simon McQuoid
- Starring: Karl Urban; Adeline Rudolph; Jessica McNamee; Josh Lawson; Ludi Lin; Mehcad Brooks; Tati Gabrielle; Lewis Tan; Damon Herriman; Chin Han; Tadanobu Asano; Joe Taslim; Hiroyuki Sanada
- Cinematography: Stephen F. Windon
- Edited by: Stuart Levy
- Music by: Benjamin Wallfisch
- Production companies: New Line Cinema; Atomic Monster; Broken Road Productions; Fireside Films
- Distributed by: Warner Bros. Pictures
- Release dates: April 27, 2026 (TCL Chinese Theatre); May 8, 2026 (United States)
- Running time: 116 minutes
- Country: United States
- Language: English
- Budget: $80 million
- Box office: $130 million

Mortal Kombat II is a 2026 American martial arts high fantasy film based on the video-game series created by Ed Boon and John Tobias. It is the sequel to Mortal Kombat (2021) and is the fourth installment in the Mortal Kombat film series. Directed by Simon McQuoid and written by Jeremy Slater, it stars returning cast members Jessica McNamee, Josh Lawson, Ludi Lin, Mehcad Brooks, Lewis Tan, Max Huang, Damon Herriman, Chin Han, Tadanobu Asano, Joe Taslim, and Hiroyuki Sanada, with Karl Urban, Adeline Rudolph, Martyn Ford, and Tati Gabrielle joining the cast. The film follows martial arts actor Johnny Cage and Edenian princess Kitana as they participate in an interdimensional tournament to stop the tyrannical Outworld emperor Shao Kahn.

Following the release of Mortal Kombat in April 2021, producer Todd Garner, writer Greg Russo, and director McQuoid began conversations about the future of the franchise, including standalone films focused on Johnny Cage and Bi-Han / Sub-Zero, and a sequel to the 2021 film. By 2022, New Line Cinema green-lit the sequel, with Slater penning the screenplay and McQuoid returning to direct. Filming began in June 2023 in Australia, was paused in mid-July due to the SAG-AFTRA strike, resumed in mid-November, and concluded in late January 2024.

Mortal Kombat II premiered at the TCL Chinese Theatre on April 27, 2026, and was theatrically released in the United States on May 8, 2026, by Warner Bros. Pictures. The film grossed $130 million worldwide on an $80 million production budget and received mixed reviews from critics, who felt it was an improvement over its predecessor, but had limited appeal outside of fans of the games.

== Plot ==
In a flashback, Emperor Shao Kahn kills King Jerrod in Mortal Kombat and conquers Edenia in the name of Outworld, claiming Queen Sindel as his consort and Princess Kitana as his daughter.

Twenty years later, as the tenth Mortal Kombat tournament approaches, Quan Chi revives Kung Lao and Kano on Shao Kahn's orders. However, Quan Chi cannot corrupt or control Kano because of his already corrupt nature. In Earthrealm, Lord Raiden and Sonya Blade recruit washed-up actor Johnny Cage as their fifth champion alongside Sonya, Liu Kang, Jax Briggs, and Cole Young, but Johnny refuses to participate.

The tournament begins with Sonya fighting a corrupted Sindel, while Johnny is forcibly teleported into a match against Kitana. Sonya kills Sindel, while Kitana defeats Johnny but spares him in defiance of Shao Kahn's orders. Kitana reveals that she is spying for Raiden, prompting her bodyguard, Jade, to confront her for betraying Shao Kahn. Meanwhile, Quan Chi retrieves Shinnok's stolen amulet from Kano. The revenant Kung Lao then wounds Raiden, allowing Quan Chi and Shang Tsung to drain Raiden's power into the amulet. They bind it to Shao Kahn, making him immortal and leaving Raiden incapacitated.

In the second round, Liu Kang faces Kung Lao and tries to redeem him but ultimately must kill him. Jax defeats Jade but spares her in gratitude for Kitana's mercy toward Johnny. Cole fights Shao Kahn and mortally wounds him, but the amulet immediately heals Shao Kahn's injuries. Shao Kahn then kills Cole and dissolves his body in acid.

Realizing that they cannot defeat Shao Kahn while he possesses the amulet, Liu Kang, Jax, Sonya, and Johnny travel to the Tarkatans' homeland. Johnny defeats their leader, Baraka, regaining his confidence and earning Baraka's trust. Baraka then guides the group to a hidden entrance beneath Shao Kahn's palace. Meanwhile, Jade captures Kitana, whom Shao Kahn chains up in a public square. The four Earthrealm champions attempt to steal the amulet, but Shao Kahn kills Jax and captures Liu Kang and Sonya for the tournament's next round.

Preferring Earthrealm's luxuries and riches to Outworld, Kano betrays Shao Kahn and tells Johnny that a revived Bi-Han holds the amulet in the Netherrealm. Using his remaining power, Raiden sends Johnny and Kano there to destroy it.

During the final round, Shao Kahn fatally wounds Liu Kang, who realizes that he is not the chosen one. Liu Kang evaporates into flames, vowing to rescue the fallen. Sonya frees Kitana but is knocked unconscious by Shao Kahn, who wins the tournament for Outworld. Kitana openly denounces Shao Kahn and pledges allegiance to Earthrealm, becoming its final champion and challenging him to a one-on-one fight.

In the Netherrealm, Johnny and Kano join forces with the spirit of Hanzo Hasashi and a reformed Jade to battle Bi-Han. They destroy the amulet, unlocking Johnny's powers in the process. With his immortality gone, Shao Kahn is unmasked and killed by Kitana, liberating Edenia and allowing her to become its queen. Shang Tsung attempts to kill the weakened Raiden, but the amulet's destruction restores Raiden's power, enabling him to defeat Shang Tsung easily.

Some time later, Johnny, Sonya, Raiden, Kitana, Jade, and Baraka reunite with Kano, who has captured Quan Chi. They plan to use Quan Chi to revive the fallen champions.

== Cast ==
- Adeline Rudolph as Kitana
  - Sophia Xu as young Kitana
- Karl Urban as Johnny Cage
  - Indy Urban as young Johnny Cage
- Martyn Ford as Shao Kahn
- Tati Gabrielle as Jade
- Jessica McNamee as Sonya Blade
- Mehcad Brooks as Jax
- Ludi Lin as Liu Kang
- Josh Lawson as Kano
- Tadanobu Asano as Lord Raiden
- Chin Han as Shang Tsung
- Damon Herriman as Quan Chi
- Joe Taslim as Bi-Han
- Hiroyuki Sanada as Hanzo Hasashi / Scorpion
- Max Huang as Kung Lao
- Lewis Tan as Cole Young
- CJ Bloomfield as Baraka
- Ana Thu Nguyen as Queen Sindel
- Desmond Chiam as King Jerrod

Mortal Kombat series co-creator Ed Boon makes a cameo appearance as a bartender.

== Production ==
=== Development ===
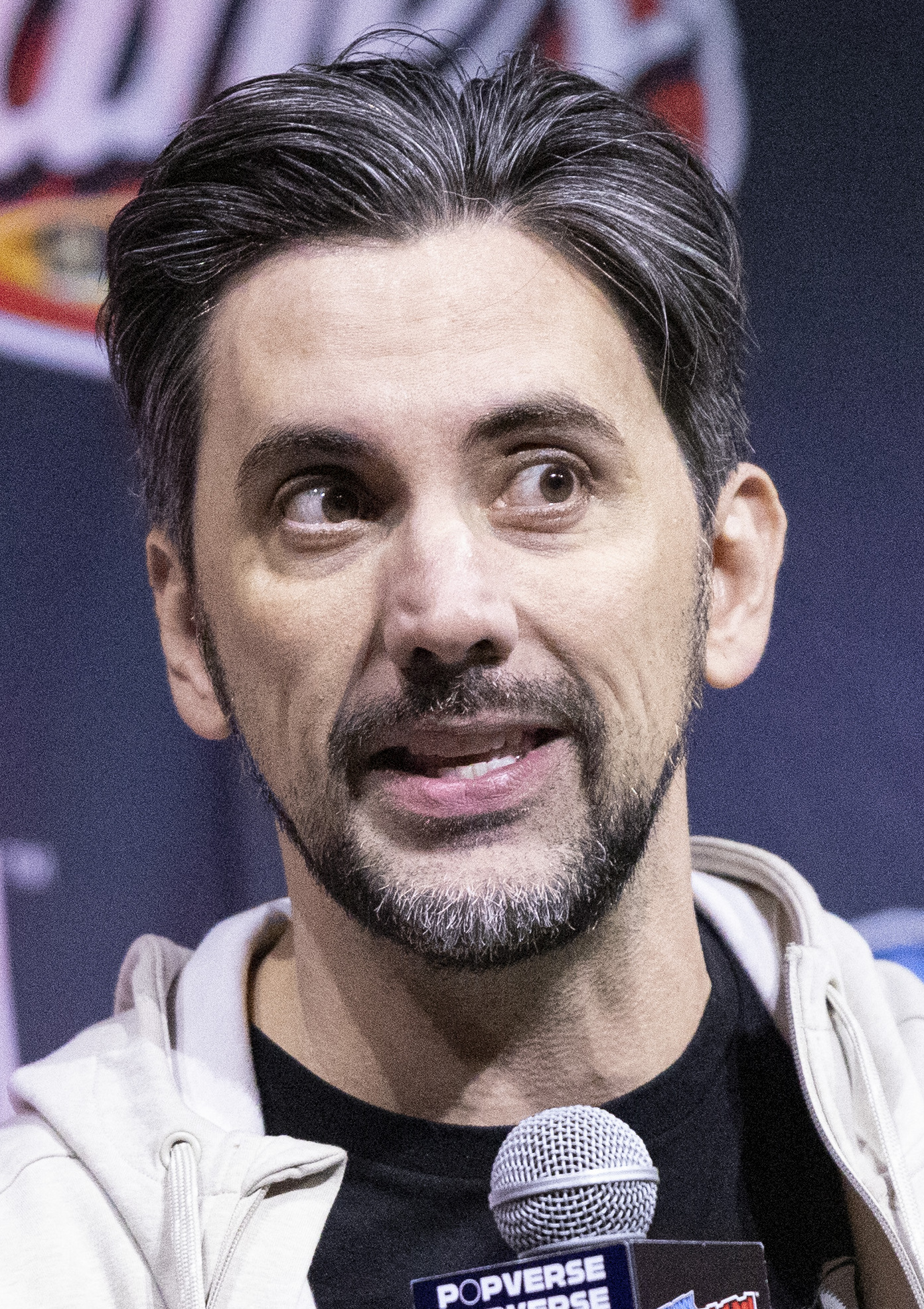
Jeremy Slater wrote the screenplay for Mortal Kombat II.

Following the release of Mortal Kombat in April 2021, actor Joe Taslim revealed that he was contracted for four additional Mortal Kombat films, if Warner Bros. Pictures decided to create a franchise. Director Simon McQuoid stated that he was open to returning to direct a sequel if the story for it was good. In an interview after the film's release, McQuoid said that the character Johnny Cage was not introduced in the film because Johnny Cage was a "giant personality" and would throw the film out of balance. He revealed that potential sequels could explore the material for characters like Cage and Kitana. He also expressed that he would like to include more female characters. Co-writer Greg Russo told Collider that he saw the reboot as a trilogy with the first film set before the tournament, the second film set during the tournament and the third film set post-tournament.

In November 2021, producer Todd Garner hinted at a sequel in development on Twitter, and in January 2022, the film was confirmed to be in development with Jeremy Slater writing the script. In May 2022, Slater confirmed plans to include Johnny Cage in the film, after the character had been set up at the end of Mortal Kombat, though he noted his exact role in the story had not been determined. That same month, Slater mentioned the film would "embrace some of [the] weirdness" inherent to the Mortal Kombat franchise, and that he wanted the film to be "unpredictable" and to defy fan expectations. In June 2022, he further explained that the sequel would address both positive and negative fan reactions to the first film. In July 2022, it was announced that the film had been greenlit by New Line and that McQuoid would return to direct the sequel.

=== Casting ===
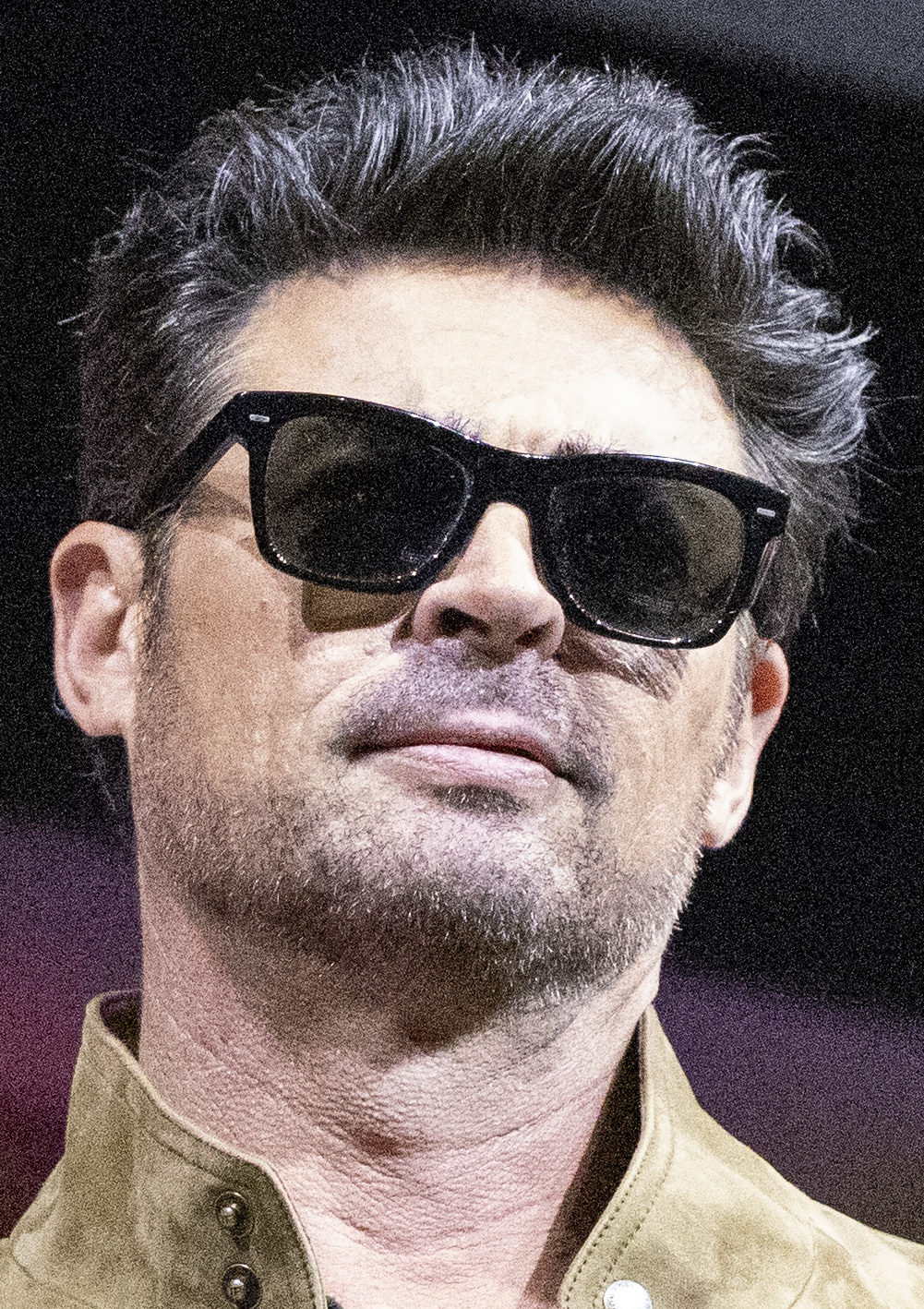
Karl Urban

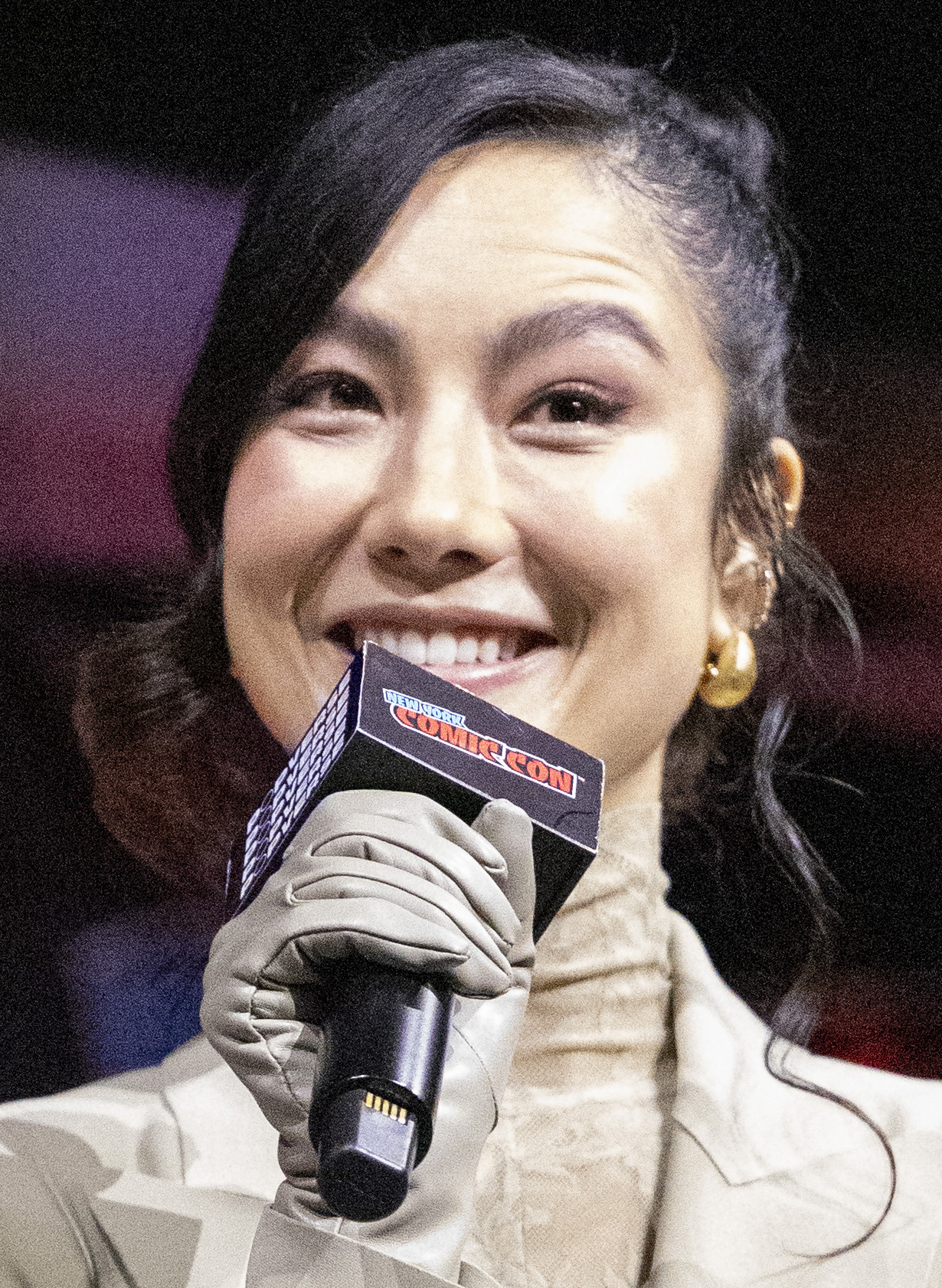
Adeline Rudolph

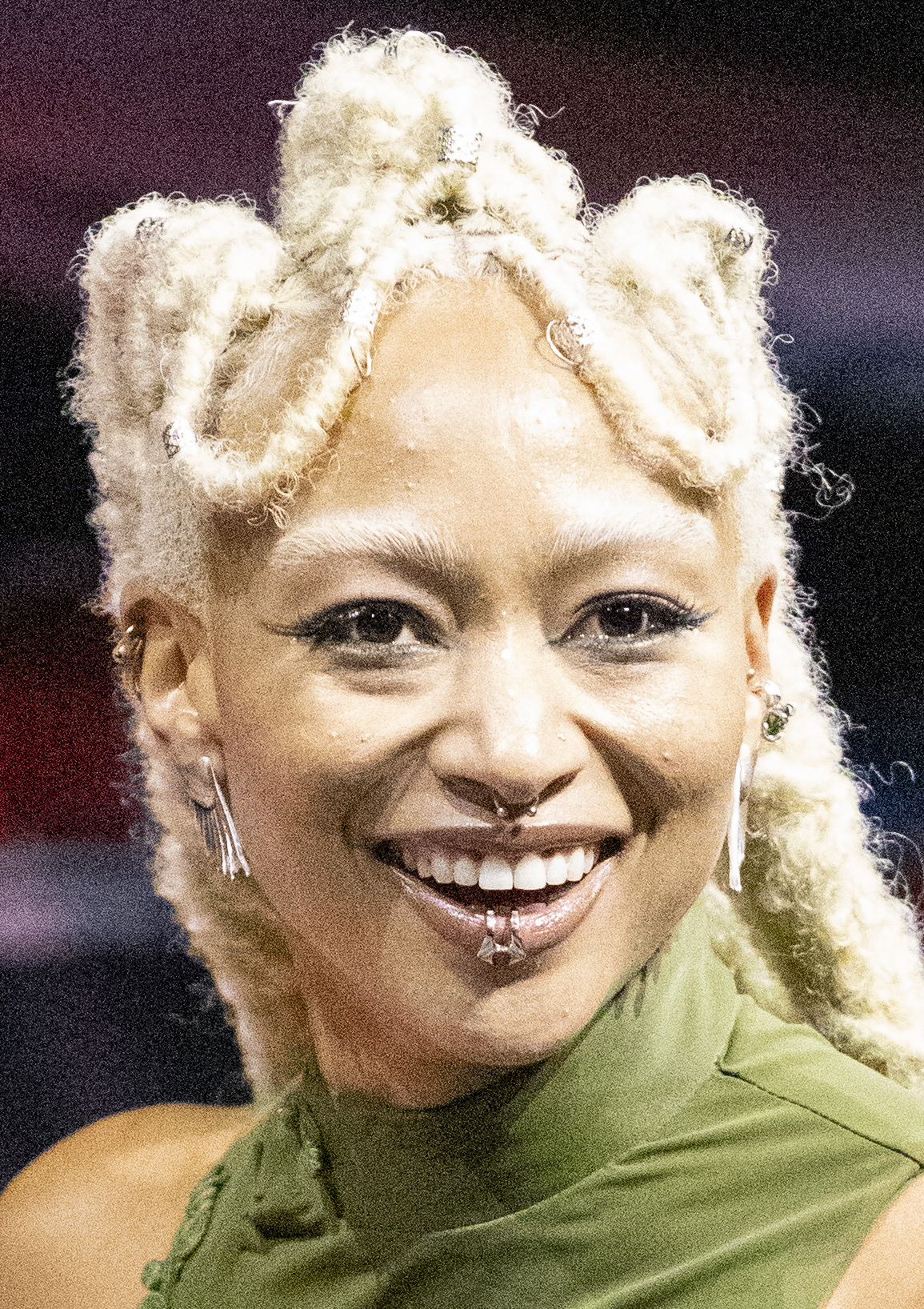
Tati Gabrielle

Urban, Rudolph, and Gabrielle joined the cast as Johnny Cage, Kitana, and Jade, respectively.

In May 2023, Tati Gabrielle was in final negotiations to play Jade in the film, with Karl Urban also in final talks to play Cage. It was also reported that Jessica McNamee and Josh Lawson would return to play Sonya Blade and Kano respectively. Later that month, Adeline Rudolph, who had worked with Gabrielle on the Netflix series Chilling Adventures of Sabrina, joined the cast as Kitana, with Gabrielle confirmed to be playing Jade. In June 2023, Martyn Ford, Desmond Chiam, Ana Thu Nguyen, and Damon Herriman were cast as Shao Kahn, King Jerrod, Queen Sindel and Quan Chi, respectively. Herriman previously voiced Kabal in the 2021 film. Later that month, Max Huang confirmed he would return as Kung Lao. A month ahead of the film's release in April 2026, Mortal Kombat co-creator Ed Boon was revealed to appear in the film.

=== Filming ===
Principal photography began on June 22, 2023, at Village Roadshow Studios in Gold Coast, Queensland, with Stephen F. Windon as the cinematographer. Due to the 2023 SAG-AFTRA strike, filming was suspended in July and resumed following the end of the strike in November 2023. Filming officially concluded in late January 2024.

== Release ==
=== Theatrical ===
Mortal Kombat II premiered at TCL Chinese Theater on April 27, 2026, and was theatrically released in the United States by Warner Bros. Pictures on May 8, 2026. It was previously scheduled to release on October 24, 2025, and May 15, 2026.

=== Home media ===
Mortal Kombat II was released on Digital HD on June 9, 2026, followed by a DVD, Blu-ray, and 4K Ultra HD release on July 28, 2026.

== Reception ==
=== Box office ===
Mortal Kombat II grossed $79.8 million in the United States and Canada, and $49.7 million in other territories, for a worldwide total of $130 million. It was produced on a budget of $80 million. Variety estimated the film would turn a profit of around $10 million for Warner Bros.

In the United States and Canada, Mortal Kombat II opened alongside The Sheep Detectives and Billie Eilish – Hit Me Hard and Soft: The Tour (Live in 3D), and was projected to gross $40–45 million from 3,503 theaters in its opening weekend. It made $17 million on its first day, including $5.2 million in Thursday night previews, and went on to debut with $38.5 million, finishing second behind The Devil Wears Prada 2. In its second weekend the film made $13.4 million (a drop of 65%), finishing in fourth, and then $6.1 million in its third weekend (including $7.6 million over the four-day Memorial Day weekend).

=== Critical response ===
On the review aggregator website Rotten Tomatoes, 63% of 207 critics' reviews are positive, with an average rating of 5.7/10. The website's consensus reads: "A self-aware slugfest that plays directly to those who know the difference between Fatalities and Babalities, Mortal Kombat II may not be a flawless victory but it's likely the most roundly enjoyable entry in the franchise yet." Metacritic, which uses a weighted average, gave the film a score of 46 out of 100, based on 35 critics, indicating "mixed or average" reviews. Audiences surveyed by CinemaScore gave the film an average grade of "B" on an A+ to F scale, down from the previous film's "B+" grade. Audiences polled by PostTrak gave it a 72% "definite recommend".

Glenn Kenny of The New York Times gave the film a positive review, writing: "The spectacle — its eardrum-shattering, eye-popping pyrotechnics, with the violence framed against all manner of phantasmagoric computer-generated backdrops — is its own reward." Frank Scheck of The Hollywood Reporter gave the film a positive review, saying: "The film has its rewards, mostly of the unsophisticated kind, since the fight sequences come fast and furious and the cheesy dialogue has enough groan-worthy one-liners to inspire a thousand drinking games," labeling the film "a tacky sequel that's strictly for the fans". Simon Abrams of RogerEbert.com gave the film two-and-a-half stars out of four, writing: "It makes good on its grisly promise whenever its meat-puppet protagonists stop talking and start pummeling each other."

Johnny Oleksinski of New York Post gave the film one star out of four, calling it "a migraine of nonstop fights and idiot characters", as well as "repetitive kills from bottom-drawer cartoons." Benjamin Lee of The Guardian gave the film two stars out of five, writing: "Treated like a premium format blockbuster does not do a film like Mortal Kombat II any favours, its junkiness less charming and more distracting, a street fighter suddenly forced to go pay-per-view." Owen Gleiberman of Variety described the film as "an old-school video-game trash extravaganza: all sound and fury and flying bodies and jargony world-building, propped up by a sludgy excuse for a story."

=== Accolades ===
Accolades received by Mortal Kombat II
Award	Date of ceremony	Category	Recipient(s)	Result	Ref.
Astra Midseason Movie Awards	June 30, 2026	Best Stunts	Mortal Kombat II	Runner-up	
Critics' Choice Super Awards	August 6, 2026	Best Superhero Movie	Mortal Kombat II	Nominated	
Critics' Choice Super Awards	August 6, 2026	Best Actress in a Superhero Movie	Adeline Rudolph	Nominated	
Golden Joystick Awards	November 11, 2026	Best Game Adaptation	Mortal Kombat II	Nominated	
The Game Awards	December 10, 2026	Best Adaptation	Mortal Kombat II	Pending	

== Sequel ==
In October 2025, during New York Comic Con, it was reported that a third film was in development, with Jeremy Slater returning as screenwriter. The sequel is not yet greenlit and depends on the reception of Mortal Kombat II.

== See also ==
- List of films based on video games
