= Mortal Kombat X =

2015 video game

- North American cover art featuring Scorpion
- Developer: NetherRealm Studios (Note: Windows version ported by High Voltage Software, later replaced by QLOC)
- Publisher: Warner Bros. Interactive Entertainment
- Director: Ed Boon
- Producers: Hans P. Lo; Adam Urbano
- Designers: Paulo Garcia; John Edwards
- Programmer: Gavin Freyberg
- Artist: Steve Beran
- Writers: Brian Chard; Dominic Cianciolo; John Vogel; Jon Greenberg
- Composer: Dynamedion
- Series: Mortal Kombat
- Engine: Unreal Engine 3
- Platforms: Microsoft Windows; PlayStation 4; Xbox One
- Release: April 14, 2015
- Genre: Fighting
- Modes: Single-player, multiplayer

Mortal Kombat X (Note: Pronounced as the letter X, not 10) is a 2015 fighting game developed by NetherRealm Studios and published by Warner Bros. Interactive Entertainment for Microsoft Windows, PlayStation 4, and Xbox One. It is the tenth main installment in the Mortal Kombat franchise and a sequel to Mortal Kombat (2011), taking place 25 years later after the events of its predecessor. High Voltage Software developed the Windows version of the game, with Polish studio QLOC taking over the work on it shortly after the release of Kombat Pack 1.

Like previous Mortal Kombat games, Mortal Kombat X's gameplay consists of two players, or one player and the CPU, fighting against each other with their selected character, using a large, varied array of character-specific attacks. The game contains several modes, such as a story mode, which mainly takes place twenty-five years after the previous Mortal Kombat game, several 'Tower' modes, which feature dynamically changing challenges, numerous online modes, and the 'Krypt', a mode played in a first person perspective, where players explore the areas unlocking a variety of in-game items.

An upgraded version of Mortal Kombat X, titled Mortal Kombat XL, (Note: Pronounced as the letters XL, not 40) was released on March 1, 2016, for PlayStation 4 and Xbox One, including all downloadable content characters from the two released Kombat Packs, almost all bonus alternate costumes available at the time of release, improved gameplay, and improved netcode. This edition was also released for Windows on October 4, 2016. A sequel, Mortal Kombat 11, was released on April 23, 2019, for Nintendo Switch, PlayStation 4, Windows, and Xbox One.

The console versions of Mortal Kombat X received critical acclaim upon release. Most praise was directed at the game's controls, overall gameplay, graphics, story, and characters, with some reviewers calling it the best game in the Mortal Kombat series. However, the game's PC version was met with mixed reception, with reviewers citing numerous technical issues (including frequent crashes and slow netcode) as problems that severely hindered the experience. Selling more than 10 million copies, the game was the fastest-selling game in the franchise and the ninth best-selling retail game of 2015 in the United States.

== Gameplay ==
The trailer for Mortal Kombat X

Mortal Kombat X is a fighting game in which two characters fight against each other using a variety of attacks, including special moves, and the series' trademark gruesome finishing moves, Fatalities. The game allows two players to face each other (either locally or online), or a single player to play against the CPU. The energy meter, first introduced in Mortal Kombat (2011), allows players to perform techniques such as "X-Ray" special moves. Similarly to NetherRealm Studios' previous title, Injustice: Gods Among Us, fighters are able to interact with the environment, using parts of the scenery to reposition themselves or using available objects as weapons. In addition, each fighter has three different variations, each featuring a different set of moves they can use during the fight: for example, the character Scorpion features a Ninjutsu variation which gives him specific moves utilizing dual swords, a Hellfire variation which incorporates fiery special moves, and an Inferno variation which allows him to summon hellspawn minions to aid him in the fight.

Returning from the previous Mortal Kombat game is the Energy Meter, which is divided in three sections, and provides access to enhanced special moves (costing one section), breaking combos (costing two sections) and performing X-ray moves (costing all three sections of the bar). Additionally, a Stamina Meter has been added under the health bar, which consists of two sections, and is consumed whenever the player runs, performs a back dash, a combo breaker, a stage interaction, or certain special techniques, such as cancelling Scorpion's teleports.

In addition to the usual Fatalities, Mortal Kombat X features two new types of finishing moves: Quitality, which instantly kills the player's character if they rage quit during a multiplayer match; and Faction Kills, a set of finishing moves available to players based on the selection of one of the game's five factions (Black Dragon, Brotherhood of Shadow, Lin Kuei, Special Forces, and White Lotus). Brutality finishing moves make a comeback, although different from the ones featured in Ultimate Mortal Kombat 3. Brutalities now take the form of certain moves that are triggered when said move is used as the final blow to win the final round in a fight, killing the opponent, provided certain conditions are met. In addition, the game features stage Brutalities, which are triggered when certain environment interactions are used to finish the opponent. Additionally, stage Fatalities were reinstated in Mortal Kombat XL, being available in three of the game's stages.

For local single-player, the game offers Story mode, a plot-driven mode with cutscenes between fights; and Living Towers, an evolved form of Mortal Kombat's Challenge Tower where the play conditions change. Also locally, player vs. player mode is available. Playing online, the play modes include 1 vs. 1 (ranked or random), King of the Hill, Survivor, and Test Your Luck. Another new mode is Faction Wars, where players choose one from the five factions to align with, and join a persistent online cross-platform competition with others, winning points for their faction, contributing in the conflict between them, ranking up personally, and earning special rewards such as faction-specific finishing moves (one of which is unlocked to the player if their faction wins at the end of any given week).

== Plot ==
Two years after the defeat of Outworld's ruler, Shao Kahn, Shinnok attacks Earthrealm with his army of Netherrealm demons, as well as Earthrealm warriors who were killed during Kahn's invasion and are now resurrected as revenants under Quan Chi's control. After fighting their fallen comrades, a strike team led by Johnny Cage, Sonya Blade, and Kenshi open a portal to Raiden's Sky Temple and head to the Jinsei Chamber, the source of Earthrealm's life force, where Raiden and Fujin are seen battling Shinnok and his Netherrealm forces. When Shinnok tries to kill Sonya, Johnny rushes to defend her, inadvertently awakening ancient superhuman powers within himself. Using his newfound powers, Johnny holds Shinnok at bay long enough for Raiden to steal Shinnok's amulet and imprison him inside it, but Quan Chi escapes. Johnny, Raiden, and Sonya track him to his lair in the Netherrealm and defeat him, successfully restoring Scorpion, Sub-Zero, and Jax to human form in the process after Quan Chi's failed attempt to turn Cage into a revenant, though the former escapes again. In the years that follow, Johnny and Sonya marry and have a daughter, Cassie, though they later divorced. Scorpion, now using his original name, Hanzo Hasashi, rebuilds his Shirai Ryu clan while mentoring Kenshi's son Takeda, and Sub-Zero becomes the new Grandmaster of the Lin Kuei after killing Sektor. Sub-Zero uses the data from Sektor's memory banks detailing Quan Chi's various manipulations of the Lin Kuei, including the truth about the deaths of Hasashi's wife and son, to help end his feud with Hasashi.

Twenty years after Shinnok's defeat, Johnny assembles a new team of young fighters composed of Cassie, Takeda, Jacqui, and Kung Lao's younger cousin (later retconned as his nephew) Kung Jin. After undergoing a training exercise with Sub-Zero, they are deployed to Outworld to resolve a civil war between former empress Mileena, who has obtained Shinnok's amulet from Kano, and Outworld's current emperor Kotal Kahn, with whom Earthrealm has a fragile peace treaty. Meanwhile, in an Outworld refugee camp in Earthrealm, Sonya captures Kano and forces him to reveal Mileena's location. Using this information, Cassie's team aids Kotal in recovering Shinnok's amulet and capturing Mileena, who is subsequently executed on Kotal's orders. No longer believing Earthrealm capable of keeping the amulet safe, Kotal decides to keep it in Outworld's hands and takes Cassie and her friends hostage as leverage against Raiden. Kotal's insectoid second-in-command D'Vorah, who had killed Baraka when Kotal started his rule, is revealed as a double agent for Quan Chi and steals the amulet. Cassie and her team escape captivity and inform Earthrealm of D'Vorah's intentions.

Hoping to stop Quan Chi from getting the amulet, Jax and Kenshi, aided by a Netherrealm local named Sareena, lead an assault on the Netherrealm. After fighting his way through the revenants of his former allies, Jax captures a weakened Quan Chi, who is brought to Earthrealm and held at an Outworld refugee camp. Hasashi infiltrates the refugee camp alongside his clan with the intent of assassinating Quan Chi as revenge for ruining his life, defeating Kenshi, Johnny, and Sonya in the process. As Hasashi prepares to kill Quan Chi, D'Vorah arrives with the amulet. Quan Chi manages to finish his spell moments before being beheaded by Hasashi, releasing Shinnok from captivity. Weakened by the Shirai Ryu's previous attack, Johnny is taken hostage by Shinnok and D'Vorah. With the aid of Quan Chi's revenants, Shinnok and D'Vorah assault the Sky Temple, and subdue Raiden and Bo' Rai Cho in the process. Shinnok then enters the Jinsei and corrupts it, transforming himself into a powerful demon in the process.

Cassie's team pursues Shinnok, only to be intercepted by Kotal Kahn and his army. They inform him of Shinnok's return and Kotal decides to kill them, hoping to appease Shinnok and buy time to bolster Outworld's defenses, but Sub-Zero and his Lin Kuei warriors appear just in time to repel the Outworld forces. At the Sky Temple, Jacqui and Takeda occupy the revenants, while Cassie and Jin enter the Jinsei chamber. When D'Vorah begins torturing Johnny, Cassie manifests powers similar to her father's, which she uses to defeat Shinnok. A grievously wounded Raiden then purifies the Jinsei, stripping Shinnok of his powers and forcing the revenants to withdraw. Sonya and her soldiers arrive to take Shinnok and D'Vorah away, and the Cage family reunites.

Sometime later, Raiden, now in possession of Shinnok's amulet and corrupted in the process of purifying the Jinsei, issues a warning to the revenants Liu Kang and Kitana, now rulers of the Netherrealm, that they will face "fates worse than death" if they threaten Earthrealm. Raiden leaves behind Shinnok's severed, but still living head as a final warning before departing.

== Characters ==
The game had 25 playable characters at launch, with 8 additional characters added via DLC. The playable characters in bold are new to the series, while the italicized ones are guest characters. Goro was available either as a pre-order bonus, or with the purchase of Kombat Pack 2.

Base Roster	DLC
**Cassie Cage**; **D'Vorah**; Ermac; **Erron Black**; **Ferra/Torr**; Goro (Note: Also available as preorder bonus.); **Jacqui Briggs**; Jax; Johnny Cage; Kano; Kenshi; Kitana; **Kotal Kahn**; **Kung Jin**; Kung Lao; Liu Kang; Mileena; Quan Chi; Raiden; Reptile; Scorpion; Shinnok; Sonya Blade; Sub-Zero; **Takeda**	**Kombat Pack 1**: Jason Voorhees; Predator; Tanya; **Tremor**; **Kombat Pack 2**: Alien; Bo' Rai Cho; Leatherface; **Triborg**

Along with series staples such as Scorpion, Sub-Zero, Liu Kang, Kitana and Raiden, several new fighters are added to the series' roster: D'Vorah, an insectoid humanoid who controls other insects; Ferra/Torr, a symbiotic pairing consisting of a young armored female warrior and a giant masked brute; and Kotal Kahn, an Aztec-inspired "blood god" who is the new emperor of Outworld. With the game's story mode spanning 20 years, the game also introduces the offspring of several characters, such as Cassie Cage, the daughter of Johnny Cage and Sonya Blade; Takeda, son of Kenshi; and Jacqui Briggs, daughter of Jax. Other series newcomers include Kung Jin, an archer, cousin of Kung Lao; and Erron Black, a Western-style gunfighter. A non-playable demonic form of Shinnok called "Corrupted Shinnok" appears as the final boss. Also, Tanya and Bo' Rai Cho, who later became downloadable characters, originally appeared in the story mode cutscenes, the former even being a non-playable opponent. Other notable characters that appear, but are not playable include Baraka, Sindel, Fujin, Rain, Sareena, Li Mei, Frost, Stryker, Kabal, Nightwolf and Smoke.

== Development ==
NetherRealm Studios began publicly hiring for the eighth generation development in April 2012. In July 2013, it was confirmed that a new Mortal Kombat game was in development and was said to be released alongside the film series' reboot in September 2011. In February 2014, actor Kiefer Sutherland claimed he was participating in this "huge game" in an unidentified role. The following June, Sutherland's involvement was denied by series co-creator Ed Boon. According to the resume of Karen Strassman, who voiced Kitana and Mileena in 2011's Mortal Kombat, the game's working title was Mortal Kombat 2. The game's poster was leaked and an updated version of the series' iconic dragon logo was revealed on May 28, 2014. Boon posted daily riddles on his Twitter account that constituted a countdown suggesting a June 2 announcement date, hinting at the game's title being Mortal Kombat X. One of the Twitter clues left by Boon teasing this title was the image of a Lincoln MKX emblem posted with the comment, "I wonder what the X stands for?"

On June 2, 2014, the title was indeed officially revealed as Mortal Kombat X, alongside an official reveal trailer featuring a fight between the iconic characters Scorpion and Sub-Zero, and an original song called "Can't Be Stopped" performed by artist Wiz Khalifa. The game made its first public appearance at E3 2014, starting on June 10, 2014, where four new characters were revealed, apart from the two already revealed by the trailer. With over eleven million views, it was the third-highest viewed trailer on YouTube in the second quarter of 2014. NetherRealm Studios said they are only working on the PlayStation 4 and Xbox One versions of the game. The game, which runs at 1080p screen resolution and 60 FPS, has been said to feature the most brutal finishing moves in the series. Boon said: "We have these meetings and everyone comes up with ideas for Fatalities. The ones that people say 'there's no way we can do that'—they're the first ones we work on."

By July 2015, due to heavy criticism for the porting issues that plagued the PC release of the game, almost all references to Mortal Kombat X had been removed from High Voltage Software's Facebook page. It was later revealed that work on the PC port had been handed over to Polish developers QLOC. On August 28, 2015, Warner Bros. announced the cancellation of the PlayStation 3 and Xbox 360 ports (originally scheduled for release at a later unspecified date) of Mortal Kombat X due to the inability to get the version for the last gen consoles to reach the quality standards set by the current generation. NetherRealm Studios community specialist Tyler Lansdown initially stated that Kombat Pack 2, Mortal Kombat XL, and the enhanced online netcode would not be available on the PC version. However, on August 25, 2016, an open beta test period of the online functionality of XL was announced for the PC, and ultimately a release date was set for October 4, 2016.

== Marketing ==
Prior to the game's release, DC Comics published a comic book series based on the game, with the first issue released on January 6, 2015. The debut trailer and opening cinematic features an original track by Wiz Khalifa titled "Can't Be Stopped". The official television commercial and launch trailer for the game were directed by System of a Down member Shavo Odadjian and featured the band's 2001 track "Chop Suey!". The Mortal Kombat X logo was featured on NASCAR driver Erik Jones' #20 Xfinity Series car (sponsored by GameStop) that won the O'Reilly Auto Parts 300 on April 10, 2015. Mortal Kombat X has been used in eSports competitions, with international tournaments in Europe, Asia, and North America with $1,000 weekly tournament prizes starting on April 19, 2015, with a season final on July 11, 2015, worth at least $100,000. The ESL Pro League Season 1 Finals were won by Critical Reaction's Dominique "Sonic Fox" McLean using Kitana with Erron Black as a secondary. McLean earned a grand total of $60,000 from the Season 1 Finals. Season Two of the ESL Pro League for Mortal Kombat X began on October 18, 2015, and concluded in early 2016.

== Release ==
Mortal Kombat X was released worldwide (except Germany) for PC, PlayStation 4, and Xbox One on April 14, 2015. For reasons relating to the initial refusal by the German USK to issue the game with an age rating, the official German release of Mortal Kombat X was delayed until September 1, 2015. The game's Kollector's Edition includes a figurine of Scorpion and the Gold Scorpion skin, as well as future access to Kombat Pack 1. Simultaneously with the release of Kombat Pack 2 and Mortal Kombat XL, the game received a free major update that introduced balance changes, one new stage ("The Pit"), several stage brutalities, and rollback-based netcode similar to GGPO.

=== Downloadable content ===
Before the game's launch, Goro was offered as a pre-order bonus. Later on, upon the game's release, he was also made available for purchase.

The game has also received numerous downloadable content (DLC) packages, containing skin packs and occasionally new characters, such as the Ultimate Horror Pack, which includes Jason and horror-themed skins for Ermac, Reptile and Mileena; or the Predator/Prey Pack, which includes Predator and Predator-themed skins for Johnny Cage, Scorpion and a skin for Jax with the likeness and voice of actor Carl Weathers from the first Predator film.

On March 13, 2015, Jason Voorhees from the Friday the 13th franchise was announced as the first downloadable bonus character in the downloadable Kombat Pack season-pass bundle. One week later, Predator, from the eponymous franchise, was revealed as the second DLC guest character after he was inadvertently leaked by the Xbox Games Store, with Tremor from Mortal Kombat: Special Forces and Tanya from Mortal Kombat 4 later rounding out the cast of the Kombat Pack. Ultimately, the pack was revealed to include all of the content in the Samurai Pack, Ultimate Horror Pack, Klassic Pack #1, Predator/Prey Pack and Klassic Pack #2. the Terminator from the eponymous franchise and Michael Myers from the Halloween franchise were considered at one point.

On September 2, 2015, Ed Boon teased a Kombat Pack 2 DLC, which would include four new characters. On December 3, 2015, the characters for Kombat Pack 2 were revealed to be Bo' Rai Cho from Mortal Kombat: Deadly Alliance, a new character named Triborg (a cyborg character that features Cyrax, Sektor, Smoke and Cyber Sub-Zero as its variations), Leatherface from The Texas Chainsaw Massacre franchise, and the Alien from the eponymous franchise. Kombat Pack 2 also makes Goro playable for those who did not have him as a pre-order bonus, and includes Kold War Scorpion, Kold War Pack, Apocalypse Pack and Klassic Fatalities #1 and #2. Kombat Pack 2 was ultimately announced for release on March 1, 2016, only on PlayStation 4 and Xbox One, marking the beginning of a period where the Windows port was left aside for any updates and new DLC releases. Eventually it was released on PC on October 4, 2016, along with the PC release of Mortal Kombat XL.

=== Mortal Kombat XL ===
On January 20, 2016, coinciding with the official announcement of Kombat Pack 2, NetherRealm Studios announced a new release of the game, called Mortal Kombat XL to be released simultaneously with said Kombat Pack, which would include all previously released downloadable content up to Kombat Pack 2. Mortal Kombat XL was then released for Xbox One and PlayStation 4 on March 1, 2016, in North America, and March 4, 2016, in Europe.

With the PC having been left behind after Kombat Pack 1, in August 2016 Ed Boon ran a poll on Twitter, which resulted in 45% of 10,000 voters saying they wanted Mortal Kombat XL for PC. After it ended, he posted the results, suggesting they would be acted upon. Shortly after, an online-only beta was officially released on August 25, 2016, as a free-to-play title on Steam in order to test the enhanced netcode, which lasted through September 1, 2016. As soon as the beta ended, it was announced that Mortal Kombat XL (both as a full game for purchase, and as an update for Mortal Kombat X owners) would become available alongside the Kombat Pack 2 DLC on October 4, 2016, along with the updates that would bring the PC port back to parity with its console counterparts. As revealed by the game's updated intro credits, the porting of XL to the PC was handled by QLOC, in opposition to the previous problematic releases, by High Voltage Software. Coinciding with the release of XL for PC, an XL Pack was announced for existing owners of the game, which provides all of the previously existing DLC in a single package. Also coinciding with the release of the PC port of Mortal Kombat XL was a balance patch affecting most of the 33 characters in the roster in all three of the game's platforms.

== Related game ==
On March 2, 2015, NetherRealm Studios announced that their mobile division would release an iOS/Android version of Mortal Kombat X in April 2015. The mobile game is described as a "free-to-play fighting/card-battler hybrid" and players would be able to unlock content in the console version of the game by playing the mobile version (and vice versa). The iOS version was released worldwide on April 7, 2015, while the Android version was soft launched on April 21, 2015, in select Asian countries and was officially launched worldwide on May 4, 2015.

With the 1.11 update version of the mobile game released on December 6, 2016, Freddy Krueger who appeared as a DLC character in MK9 was added as a mobile-exclusive character using his signature moves and X-Ray attack from MK9. On the update 1.13, Jade and Baraka were also added in the game as mobile exclusives, using their X-Rays from MK9. The latest version as of September 2017 (version 1.14) includes the popularly demanded Takeda, as well as the most recent addition to the ninja cast, Tremor. By October 4, another update was released, featuring Goro (Klassic and Tigrar Fury) and Shao Kahn. A February 2018 update introduced Bo' Rai Cho and Kintaro. An October 2018 update introduced console DLC character Leatherface. In February 2019, the game was renamed Mortal Kombat Mobile with its 2.0 update with a vast overhaul of new features for Mortal Kombat 11. Furthermore, the 2.0 update upgraded its graphics engine from Unreal Engine 3 to Unreal Engine 4.

The app has 50 million downloads on Android.

== Reception ==
=== Critical reception ===
Reception

Aggregate score
Aggregator	Score
Metacritic	iOS: 66/100; XONE: 86/100; PS4: 83/100; PC: 76/100 (XL) PS4: 85/100 (XL) PC: 84/100

Review scores
Publication	Score
Destructoid	8/10
Electronic Gaming Monthly	7.5/10
Game Informer	9.25/10
GameRevolution	4/5
GameSpot	8/10
GamesRadar+	3.5/5
GameTrailers	8.4/10
Giant Bomb	4/5
IGN	8.4/10
PC Gamer (US)	69/100
Polygon	8.5/10
VideoGamer.com	8/10
VentureBeat	65/100
TouchArcade	iOS: 4/5

Awards
Publication	Award
The Game Awards 2015	Best Fighting Game
Game Informer	Best Fighting Game
IGN	Best Fighting Game
19th Annual D.I.C.E. Awards	Fighting Game of the Year

Mortal Kombat X received largely positive reviews. Aggregating review website Metacritic gave the Xbox One version 86/100 based on 21 reviews, the PlayStation 4 version 83/100 based on 81 reviews, and the Windows version 76/100 based on 10 reviews. It became the fastest selling game in the history of the Mortal Kombat series and topped the US and UK PlayStation 4 sales charts in the month of release.

Brian Shea of Game Informer called Mortal Kombat X "more than the continuation of NetherRealm's successful vision for the franchise; it's one of the best fighting games in years", adding that the core gameplay was complex and varied while he enjoyed the multiplayer options. GameSpot's Peter Brown enjoyed the overall gameplay, saying it had "the best fighting mechanics of any game in the series" but was critical of the downloadable content as "there's so much to love about the new Mortal Kombat that it's a shame to see such blatant monetization practices overlap with your experience". Lucas Sullivan of GamesRadar described the story mode as "ceaselessly entertaining", having "great voice-acting and a surprisingly enjoyable script", and "a pretty tough act to follow", criticizing the other single-player modes outside of the main story, and "sparse" tutorial options.

Destructoid's Chris Carter scored the game an 8 out of 10 and called it "one of the biggest fighting games of 2015". Carter felt that as more characters are added via DLC, the game will get better over time. VideoGamer.com's Brett Phipps gave the game an 8/10 and called it "absurd, gruesome ridiculous fun". Phipps mostly praised the story, character gameplay variety, and gore, but was annoyed by online "hiccups". Nick Tan from Game Revolution commended the gameplay, particularly complimenting the character variations, environmental attacks, Brutalities, the Krypt, and the Tower system. Tan also liked the overall presentation and the story's concept, but missed Stage Fatalities and tag-team matches, disliked the story's ending, and felt that the game was purposefully "truncated".

Michael Huber of GameTrailers called it a "superb entry in the franchise", noting the gameplay, story mode and new online components. Vince Ingenito of IGN gave it a score of 8.4. He claimed that Mortal Kombat X was the best Mortal Kombat game in the franchise's history, lauding it as deeper, mechanically richer and more fully featured than the previous Mortal Kombat games. He also praised the presence of the new characters as the major roster shakeup made the game feel new and exciting to longtime series fans and casual fans. Michael McWhertor of Polygon called the game "one of the best fighting games in the series", praising the gameplay in addition to the newer systems in place and overall presentation. Stephen Kleckner of VentureBeat was more critical of the game, citing in his opinion confusing move animations, a system favoring close range mid-to-high combos, having to use the block button to execute a run, poor online play, and easy Fatality DLC. He also mentioned an issue where save data would be erased due to a bug in the PC version. Matt Elliott of PC Gamer had mixed feelings about the online gameplay and said that "Mortal Kombat online simply isn't sturdy enough to remain competitive".

=== Sales ===
In March 2019, Warner Bros. confirmed that Mortal Kombat X had sold more than 12 million copies worldwide by then. It was the fastest-selling game in the franchise and was the ninth-best-selling retail game of 2015 in the United States. The first-month sales of the game is higher than the first-month sales of every game released in April 2016.

=== Awards ===
List of awards and nominations
Award	Category	Result
The Game Awards 2015	Best Fighting Game	Won
2015 NAVGTR Awards	Game, Franchise Fighting	Won
2015 NAVGTR Awards	Camera Direction in a Game Engine	Nominated
19th Annual D.I.C.E. Awards	Fighting Game of the Year	Won
