= Jax (Mortal Kombat) =

Mortal Kombat character

- Mortal Kombat character
- Jax in Mortal Kombat 11 (2019)
- First appearance: Mortal Kombat II (1993)
- Created by: Ed Boon and John Tobias
- Designed by: Various: John Tobias (MKII, MK3, MK4, MK:SF); Luis Mangubat (MKvsDCU); Atomhawk Design (MK9); Marco Nelor (MKX)
- Voiced by: Various: Ed Boon (1993–1999); Dorian Harewood (animated series); Craig J. Harris (2000–2002); Simeon Norfleet (2005–2006); Dan Washington (MKvsDCU); Marz Timms (MK9); Greg Eagles (MKX); Carl Weathers (MKX, DLC skin); William Christopher Stephens (2019–present); Ike Amadi (2020s animated films)
- Portrayed by: Various: Gregory McKinney (1995 film); Lynn "Red" Williams (Annihilation); Michael Jai White (short film, web series); Mehcad Brooks (2021 film)
- Motion capture: Various: John Parrish (MKII—MK4, MK:A); Carlos Pesina (MK:SF); Sean Okerberg (MKvs.DCU); Israel Idonije (MK11)

In-universe information
- Full name: Jackson Briggs
- Family: Jacqui Briggs (daughter)
- Origin: United States
- Nationality: American

Jackson "Jax" Briggs is a character in the Mortal Kombat fighting game franchise by Midway Games and NetherRealm Studios. Introduced in Mortal Kombat II (1993) as the leader of a Special Forces unit, he became a mainstay of the series, including as the protagonist of the action-adventure spin-off Mortal Kombat: Special Forces (2000). The character is distinguished by his metal bionic arms, which he first received in Mortal Kombat 3 (1995), and his abilities are based around his upper-body strength.

In the games, Jax is first depicted as the commanding officer of Special Forces operative Sonya Blade and subsequently becomes one of the warriors defending Earthrealm from various threats. He is also depicted as a primary hero in various related media, including the 1996 animated series Mortal Kombat: Defenders of the Realm, the 1997 film Mortal Kombat Annihilation, and the 2011 web series Mortal Kombat: Legacy. Reception to the character has been generally positive for his appearance and special moves.

== Character design ==
Jax was originally named "Kurtis Stryker," and was to be in the roster of the inaugural 1992 first game of the franchise while possessing the storyline of pursuing Kano and his entrapment on Shang Tsung's island. The character was ultimately postponed upon the developers' realization that there were no female fighters in the game, which resulted in Sonya Blade taking his place instead and inheriting much of his originally intended storyline. Stryker was officially added into Mortal Kombat II, where he was the first character made for the game, but renamed "Jax" during the development process.

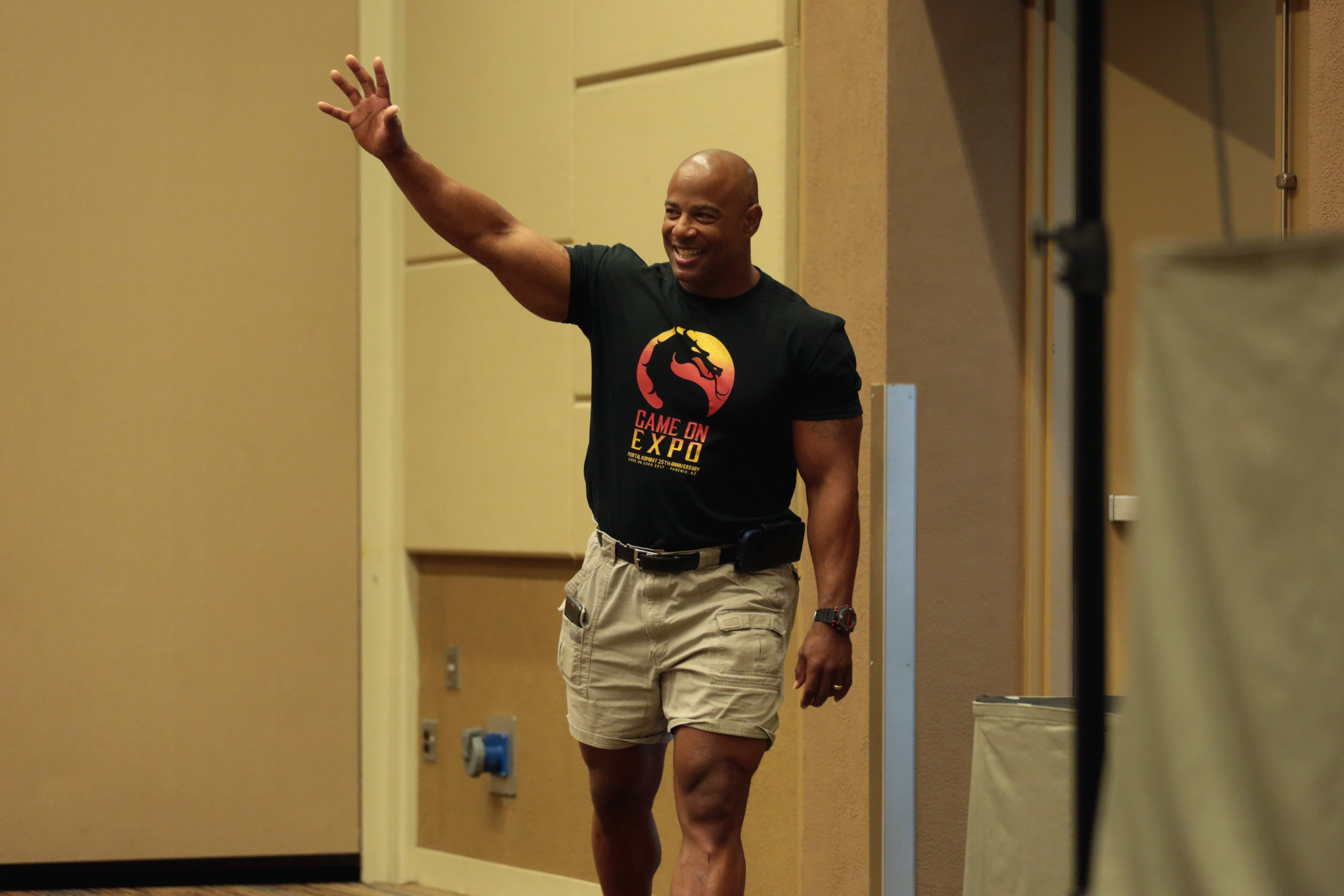
John Parrish in 2017

Played by bodybuilder John Parrish, Jax was originally conceived for the game as a kickboxer dressed in shorts and a headband, but this concept was nixed due to potential similarities to Street Fighter's boxer character Balrog. Jax was then outfitted in a yellow gi with metal forearms that clanged upon impact. Digitized game footage of the character in the costume was shot over two days, during which Parrish accidentally split the pants. The design was aborted thereafter by the developers as they felt the character did not look big enough, so Parrish was called back by Midway several months later for a re-shoot, for which he went shirtless with simple black tights. For Mortal Kombat 3, he had Jax's bionic implants painted onto his arms, a process that took six hours.

In early development screenshots of Mortal Kombat Deadly Alliance, released to the public in 2001, Jax was seen facing off against Scorpion while wearing his MK3 costume, but he was given a complete makeover for the finished product with a military-themed, while in MK vs. DC Universe and the 2011 reboot, he sported a pair of dog tags around his neck. Jax has gone shirtless in all iterations of his main costumes in the Mortal Kombat fighting games, with the exception of MKvsDC, in which he was fully clothed with no skin exposed save for his head and face, and his bionics were adorned with green LED lights.

== Appearances ==
=== Mortal Kombat games ===
==== Midway games ====
Jax's first game appearance came in Mortal Kombat II (1993), where he is on a mission to find his Special Forces partner, Lieutenant Sonya Blade, who had gone missing in Outworld while attempting to apprehend Kano. Though he succeeds in rescuing Sonya, Kano manages to evade capture.

When Outworld emperor Shao Kahn invades Earthrealm in Mortal Kombat 3 (1995), Jax is among the thunder god Raiden's chosen warriors to help save Earthrealm; preparing for battle by fitting his arms with metallic bionic implants. After helping foil Shao Kahn's attempt to permanently claim Earth as his own, Jax and Sonya found the Outer World Investigation Agency (OIA), which specializes in exploring and mapping other realms as well as the destruction of interdimensional portals that could lead to Earth.

Major Jackson "Jax" Briggs makes his first chronological appearance in the 2000 action-adventure game Mortal Kombat: Special Forces, in which he attempts to stop Kano and the Black Dragon crime organization from stealing an artifact capable of opening portals to other realms.

In Mortal Kombat 4 (1997), Jax and Sonya arrest Black Dragon member, Jarek, but they all end up joining forces with other Earthrealm heroes to stop fallen Elder God Shinnok and his Netherealm forces. After witnessing Jarek attack Sonya, Jax saves her and throws him over a cliff. (Note: Sonya, Jax, and Jarek all shared the same Mortal Kombat 4 ending, but with varying outcomes for each character. Jax and Jarek's feature the latter throwing Sonya to her death over the cliff after he plummets to his apparent demise in his failed attempt to attack Sonya. In Sonya's ending, Jarek's death is legitimate, while in Jarek's own ending, his hand reaches up over the edge to grab Sonya by the ankle and pull her off. This is further extended in Jax's ending, in which Jarek is then killed by Jax in retaliation. All deaths therein were non-canonical; in Mortal Kombat: Armageddon, it is revealed in Jarek's biography that he survived his fall and used the incident to fake his death while he recuperated.) While returning to Earthrealm, Jax and Sonya find the malfunctioning Lin Kuei cyborg Cyrax stranded in a desert, and bring him back to the OIA headquarters, where they restore his humanity and recruit him as an agent of the Special Forces.

In Mortal Kombat: Deadly Alliance (2002), Sonya and Jax have added the blind swordsman Kenshi into their ranks, but the OIA's underground facility is destroyed by Hsu Hao, who reveals himself to be part of the evil Red Dragon clan; bitter rivals of the Black Dragon. When Hsu Hao is later sent by Red Dragon leader Mavado to kill the sorcerer Shang Tsung, Jax intercepts and kills him. However, in the battle against the titular Deadly Alliance of Shang Tsung and Quan Chi, Jax and his allies are killed and resurrected by the Dragon King Onaga to become his slaves.

While Jax is not playable in Mortal Kombat: Deception (2004), (Note: He is a selectable character in Mortal Kombat: Unchained, the PSP port of Deception.) he plays a minor role in the storyline when Shao Kahn's former enforcer Ermac and the spirit of Liu Kang break Onaga's mind control over Jax and his comrades. He returns in Mortal Kombat: Armageddon (2006), in which Jax becomes playable again. Sonya sends Jax to lead a unit in search of survivors after destroying Sektor's Tekunin warship.

Jax is one of the eleven characters representing Mortal Kombat in the non-canonical 2008 crossover fighting game Mortal Kombat vs. DC Universe. In his ending, he underwent further mechanization to increase his power, though at the cost of his humanity.

==== Netherealm Studios games ====
In the 2011 Mortal Kombat game, which is a reboot of the first three games, Jax is present at the start of the Shaolin Tournament and works with Sonya to bring down the Black Dragon. While they succeed in seizing many of their weapons caches, the Special Forces' key informant, Kano, is discovered to be a high-powered member of the organization, causing Jax and Sonya to focus on Kano's capture following the deaths of many of their comrades. This leads them to the Mortal Kombat tournament on Shang Tsung's uncharted island, where Jax is captured and imprisoned, forcing Sonya to participate in the tournament to spare his life. Raiden later enables Sonya to free a wounded Jax, but Shang Tsung destroys their extraction transport, stranding them on the island. Raiden reappears to heal Jax's injuries, which makes Sonya and Jax aware of both his presence and their crucial role in defending Earthrealm alongside Raiden's other chosen warriors. After Liu Kang's victory over Shang Tsung, Sonya is held captive in Outworld before being rescued by Jax, who does not take part in the second tournament after his arms are psychically obliterated in a confrontation with Ermac and he is transported back to Earthrealm for medical attention. Sonya and Jax, now with newly outfitted cybernetic arms, reunite with the other Earthrealm warriors to repel Shao Kahn's invasion of Earthrealm. While Raiden and Liu Kang commune with the Elder Gods, the Lin Kuei ninja clan and Shao Kahn's wife Sindel attack. While Sonya survives, Jax is killed and resurrected by Quan Chi in the Netherealm as one of his undead revenant slaves.

Jax returns as a playable character in Mortal Kombat X. Two years after he was enslaved by Quan Chi, Raiden and Sonya manage to resurrect him. Due to his traumatic experience as a revenant, he retires from the Special Forces, marries a woman named Vera, and becomes a farmer. A further twenty years later, his adult daughter Jacqui followed in his footsteps and joined the Special Forces alongside Cassie Cage, the daughter of Sonya and Johnny Cage; albeit against her father's initial wishes, though he eventually came around to support her. Jax, Sareena, and Kenshi are assigned to capture Quan Chi in the Netherrealm to use him to revive their friends. He loses most of his men in the battle, but soon captures Quan Chi and transports him to Earthrealm.

Jax returns in Mortal Kombat 11. Two years after the previous game, Jax has secluded himself on his farm following Vera's death and his honorable discharge from the Special Forces. After Kronika, the keeper of time, fractures the timeline in an attempt to start anew, a younger version of Jax gets brought to the present. She also recruits the present Jax to her side after promising him a new life in her new era, which brings him into conflict with Jacqui and his younger self. While leading an attack on Kronika's keep, Raiden encourages the present Jax to fight for Earthrealm once more after telling him Kronika is Shinnok's mother. In the DLC story expansion Aftermath, a time-travelling Fujin helps bring the present Jax to his senses, leading to him abandoning Kronika's cause before the final battle.

While Jax isn't playable in the base roster of Mortal Kombat 1, he does appear as an assist-based Kameo fighter. During the climax of the game's story, multiple timeline variants of Jax can be seen during the final battle. In Kenshi's tower ending, Jax in Liu Kang's new timeline is revealed to be an FBI agent who helps Kenshi take down the Yakuza. After the battle, they are confronted by Shang Tsung. Following the incident, he learns from Kenshi as well as Johnny Cage's movies about the threats Outworld poses to Earthrealm and got his superiors to form the Outworld Investigation Agency and hire Kenshi as an agent.

=== Other media ===
Michael Jai White as Jax in the 2011 first season of Mortal Kombat: Legacy. White first portrayed the character in the 2010 short film Mortal Kombat: Rebirth.

As in the games, Jax often appears in alternate Mortal Kombat media as one of thunder god Raiden's warriors chosen to defend Earthrealm from Outworld forces. He is briefly seen in the 1995 film Mortal Kombat where he and Sonya are pursuing Kano. He was played by Gregory McKinney, while his name was misspelled as "Jaxx" in the closing credits. Jax was among many characters recast for the 1997 sequel Mortal Kombat Annihilation, in which he was played by former American Gladiators actor Lynn "Red" Williams; in this film, Jax played a larger role as Sonya's partner and one of Earthrealm's chosen warriors. Mehcad Brooks played the character in the 2021 reboot film Mortal Kombat. Brooks reprises his role in the sequel.

Jax was a featured character in the 1996 animated series Mortal Kombat: Defenders of the Realm, in which he was depicted as cool-minded and regularly in an amiable mood. He was voiced by Dorian Harewood.

In Kevin Tancharoen's 2010 short film Mortal Kombat: Rebirth, Michael Jai White played Jax as a police detective in the fictional location of Deacon City, and reprised the role for the first two episodes of Tancharoen's 2011 Mortal Kombat: Legacy web series. White said in a 2011 interview with MTV that he was originally to play Jax in the first Mortal Kombat film, but he turned it down in order to star in HBO's 1995 Mike Tyson biopic. He was again cast as Jax in Annihilation before ultimately dropping out upon being cast in the title role of Spawn.

Ike Amadi voiced the character in the 2020 animated film Mortal Kombat Legends: Scorpion's Revenge and the 2021 sequel Mortal Kombat Legends: Battle of the Realms.

Jax is a featured character in the 1994 Midway-produced Mortal Kombat II comic book that was written and illustrated by series co-creator John Tobias, which introduces the game's new characters and is used to set up the events leading to the second tournament. He makes a single-panel appearance in the special-edition Mortal Kombat 4 comic packaged with the 1998 PC release of the game, contacting Sonya by radio as she pursues Black Dragon member Jarek.

In Malibu Comics' Mortal Kombat comic series, Jax first appears in the September–November 1994 "Goro: Prince of Pain" three-issue miniseries, which featured MKII characters and tied into the 1994 "Blood & Thunder" six-issue story arc that covered the tournament from the first game. In the miniseries U.S. Special Forces, released in two parts in January and February 1995, he and Sonya work to capture an original Black Dragon character named Rojack. Jax then featured in the six-part "Battlewave" miniseries that year, where he is brutally attacked by Goro and left in a coma, but awakens to fight off an assassination attempt and joins Cage on a mission in Outworld, where the Earthrealm heroes succeed in breaking up a wedding between a brainwashed Sonya and Shao Kahn.

=== Merchandise ===
An action figure of Jax was released by Toy Island in 1996 as part of their Mortal Kombat Trilogy line. He and Reptile were featured in an "X-Ray" pack of two six-inch figures with transparent upper bodies that were based on the 2011 reboot and produced by Jazwares. The company also released a four-inch Jax figure in 2012 that was packaged with an Uzi submachine gun (which was not in the game), but the figure was discontinued after only several months in release.

== Reception ==
=== Racial characterization and response ===
Jax's noncanonical Mortal Kombat 11 ending, in which he manipulates time in order to end the Atlantic slave trade, drew online criticism from players for its perceived "woke" political agenda, and resulted in the game being review bombed. Michael McWhertor of Polygon nonetheless praised the ending as "the best and boldest in the game", while The Mary Sue criticized the backlash: "Why is this 'too woke'? Why is this threatening to people, when all it does is offer an alt-reality where we didn't have 400 years of race-based chattel slavery?" Kotaku noted, "There is no mention [therein] of 'black power.' There is no indication that ... developer Netherrealm Studios is promoting 'white genocide.'" Joseph Knoop of The Daily Dot said: "It's a ridiculous reaction to an already ridiculous story — and something tells me Mortal Kombat wouldn't have it any other way." While Wes Fenlon of PC Gamer was also supportive in that the ending "tackles a heavy subject in its short running time", he considered it "unsurprisingly vague on the details." TheGamer commented, "Jax's ending has been blown so far out of context in a negative way that one would believe it to have been some explicit declaration of a political statement. Instead ... it is clear how ridiculous the outrage is." In his 2022 book Mortal Kombat: Games of Death, author David Church wrote that the "outsize response to a common trope of alternate-history speculative fiction supports [a] caveat that racist attitudes brought into the game's reception by a subgroup of angry gamers may be a stronger force than in-game representations themselves."

In 2021, Wired cited the debuts of Jax ("the all-American soldier") in Mortal Kombat II and Balrog in Street Fighter II (1991) as "lead[ing] the mainstream charge in terms of casting a variety of genders and races" in fighting games. That same year, Alex Miller of Inverse wrote: "Playing as Balrog and Jax in Street Fighter II and Mortal Kombat II completely blew my mind. ... It was satisfying seeing characters of color being on equal footing with the likes of Ryu and Scorpion, and if you were skilled enough, you could manipulate them to kick anybody's ass in the game. It felt fair — finally." Game Informer cited Jax among its "Respectful Representations of Blackness In Gaming" in 2022, commenting that while he "suffers from a stereotypical 'big, angry black man' musculature ... most black fighters (like Balrog and Bruce Irvin) are shackled by their shady pasts and antagonistic tendencies, [but] Jax stands atop the heap as a captivating leader, loyal friend, and protective father." However, in describing black characters in video games as "over-reliant on outdated, one-dimensional stereotypes", Laura Francis of GamesRadar+ remarked that Jax's "huge bulging biceps and loud demeanour are his primary defining traits." Game designer Brenda Brathwaite, writing for The Escapist in 2008 on the stereotyping of African-American video game characters, criticized the "ridiculous" attributes of black characters from "violent" fighting games such as Jax's "Machine Gun" special move (from Deadly Alliance and MK vs. DC Universe) and T.J. Combo's "Target Practice" finisher from Killer Instinct 2 in which he pulls out a gun and fatally shoots his opponent. Kyle A. Harris of Southern Illinois University Carbondale, in a 2016 study titled The New Blackface: The Transition of Black One-Dimensional Characters from Film to Video Games, categorized Jax along with Final Fantasy VII character Barret Wallace and Balrog and Dee Jay from Street Fighter as "hulking figures over six feet tall with extremely huge muscles and brash personalities." Harris further opined that Jax and Barret's cybernetic enhancements further perpetuated and emphasized their physical strength.

=== Other reception ===
Jax has received a mixed to generally positive reception over the course of his in-game appearances. While his Mortal Kombat II appearance has been criticized, his design from Mortal Kombat 3 and onward have met with praise. GameFront called him "a character no one cares about," but Den of Geek ranked Jax 35th in their 2015 rating of the series' 77 playable characters for his role as the "cool as hell ... super-strong Army dude".

Jax was widely seen as a top-tier character of Mortal Kombat II. He was considered as such by GamePro in their 1993 character rankings, in which they placed him second out of the game's twelve playables behind Mileena: "It's hard to fight against a good Jax [player] that knows how to control space and use his projectile well." According to CU Amiga, Jax was "the best all-round character," but "not quite as nimble on his feet as [the] other characters." Sega Visions opined that Jax "had the best offense" in the game, while "his slow movement and less-than-powerful uppercut are his weaknesses." According to Total 64, Jax in Mortal Kombat Trilogy was a "top fighter, that is equally good in the air as on the ground." According to Alex Vo of GameSpy, he was a "versatile" character but his tonfa weapon style in the game had "no range," while he was best utilized only in distant or up-close combat. In Prima's official guide for the 2011 Mortal Kombat reboot, Jax "has generally changed over the years from a defensive machine to an offensive powerhouse," and displays no particular advantage over other characters but is very disadvantaged when playing against Shang Tsung. The publisher additionally considered Jax from MKII to be one of the "cheapest" Mortal Kombat characters, citing his specials such as his unblockable "Ground Pound" and "Quadruple Slam" while opining that the first game had no such unblockable specials but "that line of sensible thinking was thrown out the window when Mortal Kombat 2 came around." Den of Geek noticed that across the franchise Jax been given mechanical arms in different forms (from equippable bionic armor in the original canon to prosthetic replacements in the reboot), often resulting in noticeable gore in order to simply add them. In his debut as a main character, Mortal Kombat: Special Forces, it comes across instead as a "a trial run for what would one day become a permanent upgrade". Director McQuoid talked about changing the usage of mechanical arms with Sub-Zero instead being the one takes Jax's arm in order to further mixed him in the narrative with the main cast as Sub-Zero acts as a major antagonist in such reboot film. With the new reboot game coming in 2023, GameRant noticed several fans were questioning how Jax would lose his arms in Mortal Kombat 1. GameSpot felt that while the 2023 reboot takes several liberties, Jax instead keeps wearing his most iconic outfit alongside other recurring characters.

Reaction to Jax's Fatalities has been mixed. His finishers from Mortal Kombat II have been well received, with the "Arm Rip" Fatality additionally voted by readers of GamePro as the best Mortal Kombat finisher in 1995. His "Giant Stomp" from Mortal Kombat 3, in which he grows off-screen to a gargantuan height and then crushes his opponent with his foot, was included in IGN's 2010 ranking of their "Unofficial Top 10 List" of the best series finishers, but made GamePro's 2008 list of the 12 "LAMEST" Fatalities: "If you have the ability to grow to 200 feet tall, you should probably unleash it at the beginning of a battle instead of the end." Game Informer called it one of the game's "most confusing" finishers. Jax has additionally received negative attention for his Mortal Kombat 4 ending, in which he kills Jarek after the latter drops Sonya off a cliff.

Response to Jax's alternate-media representations is mixed. Eric Snider of Film.com said of Williams' performance in Mortal Kombat Annihilation, "Since he's The Black Guy, the movie makes him say things like 'That's what I'm talkin' about!' and 'Let's do this!'" Blair Marnell of CraveOnline praised White's performance in Mortal Kombat: Legacy: "White really carries the piece as Jax ... this is a Jax that I can buy as a main character." IGN described White in the series as "doing what he does best—kicking some serious ass."

== See also ==
- United States Army Special Forces in popular culture
