= Max Huang =

German-Indonesian actor and stuntman (born 1988)

- Huang at Dragon Con 2025 in Atlanta, GA
- Born: Julian Maximilian Widjaja; 22 September 1988 (age 38); Nuremberg, Bavaria, West Germany
- Occupations: Actor; stunt performer; singer
- Relatives: Iskandar Widjaja (cousin)

Chinese name
- Traditional Chinese: 黃又亮
- Simplified Chinese: 黄又亮
Transcriptions
Standard Mandarin
- Hanyu Pinyin: Huáng Yòuliàng

Max Huang You-liang (born Julian Maximilian Widjaja; 22 September 1988) is a German-Indonesian actor, martial artist and stunt performer. He is known for his role of Kung Lao in the 2021 film Mortal Kombat, based on the fighting video game of the same name, and for being a member of the Jackie Chan Stunt Team.

== Early life ==
Huang was born Julian Maximilian Widjaja in Nuremberg to an Indonesian father, conductor Noorman Widjaja, and a German mother. He began studying Wing Chun at the age of 11, and later joined the German National Wushu Team, winning a gold medal at the 2009 German Nationals. He studied acting in the United Kingdom.

While working in the Chinese film industry, he adopted the Chinese name Huang You-liang (Chinese: 黃又亮) - Widjaja is the Indonesian transliteration of ‘Huang’ and ‘You-liang’ is the Chinese soundalike for ‘Julian’.

== Career ==
Huang started in the film industry as a member of the Jackie Chan Stunt Team, as stunt performer and coordinator; he has worked in films such as Police Story 2013 (2013), Matthew Vaughn's Kingsman: The Secret Service (2014) and The Foreigner (2017). He was the first German-born member of the team.

Huang played Kung Lao in the 2021 film Mortal Kombat.

Music

In April 2021, he wrote and released a single titled "Flawless Victory", which was produced by rapper Vinnie Paz and featured his cousin, the violinist Iskandar Widjaja.

== Personal life ==
Huang is the brother of stuntman/stunt coordinator/actor Lee Huang and cousin of violinist Iskandar Widjaja. He resides in Taiwan.

== Filmography ==
=== Film ===
Year	Title	Involved in			Role	Notes
Year	Title	Acting	Stunts	Other	Role	Notes
2010	Dead Survivors	Yes	Yes		Zombie	
2010	Burning Man	Yes			Gangster	
2012	The Ego	Yes			Cafe Guest #1	Short film
2012	Shanghai Calling		Yes			Stunt coordinator
2012	CZ12	Yes			Michael's Bodyguard	
2013	Tribal Ties	Yes			Shakkah	Short film
2013	Police Story 2013	Yes	Yes		'Hercules'	
2014	Sorry, I Love You		Yes			
2014	Outcast	Yes			Bandit	
2014	Kingsman: The Secret Service		Yes			
2015	Dragon Blade	Yes			Shou Xia	
2016	Time Raiders	Yes	Yes		Igor	
2016	Skiptrace		Yes			
2017	The Lego Ninjago Movie		Yes			
2017	The Foreigner		Yes			Assistant stunt coordinator: UK
2017	Bleeding Steel		Yes			Fight & stunt coordinator
2019	No Way Out	Yes			Chen	Short film, also director
2020	Vanguard		Yes			Assistant stunt coordinator: UK
2021	Mortal Kombat	Yes			Kung Lao	
2023	Hidden Strike	Yes	Yes		Chinese Mercenary	Stunt coordinator
2026	Mortal Kombat II	Yes			Kung Lao	
2026	7 Dogs	Yes				Saudi Arabian film
2026	Kung Fu Deadly	Yes			Marrs	

=== Television ===
Year	Title	Role	Notes
2010	Lasko – Die Faust Gottes	Ninja	Uncredited
2017	Sense8	Prison Guard	Episode: "Obligate Mutualisms"

=== Music videos ===
Year	Title	Artist(s)
2021	"Flawless Victory"	Himself
