= Johnny Cage =

Mortal Kombat character

- Mortal Kombat character
- Johnny Cage in Mortal Kombat 11 (2019)
- First appearance: Mortal Kombat (1992)
- Created by: John Tobias
- Designed by: Various: John Tobias (early games); Steve Beran (MK:DA); Mark Lappin (MK:SM); Cy Mandua (MK9)
- Voiced by: Various: Jeff Bennett (1995 animated film); Ed Boon (MK4); Matt Chapman (MK:SM); Jeff Pilson (MK9); Andrew Bowen (2015–present); Linden Ashby (MK11 premier skin); Jean-Claude Van Damme (MK1 premier skin); Joel McHale (2020s animated films)
- Portrayed by: Various: Linden Ashby (1995 film); Chris Conrad (Annihilation); Matt Mullins (short film, Legacy I); Casper Van Dien (Legacy II); Karl Urban (2026 Film)
- Motion capture: Daniel Pesina (MK, MKII); Chris Alexander (MKT)

Johnny Cage (Jonathan "John" Carlton) is a character in the Mortal Kombat fighting game franchise by Midway Games and NetherRealm Studios. Introduced in the original 1992 game, he is an American action hero with an extensive martial arts background. The series depicts Cage as one of the primary heroes defending Earthrealm from various threats, as well as the comic foil. In the first rebooted timeline, Cage is also the love interest of Special Forces officer Sonya Blade and the father of their daughter Cassie Cage.

Cage is inspired by martial arts star Jean-Claude Van Damme, particularly Van Damme's character, Frank Dux, in the 1988 film Bloodsport. A staple of the franchise, Cage has appeared in various media outside of the games. Reception of the character has been generally positive for his role in the series, character development, gameplay, and Fatality finishing moves.

== Concept and design ==
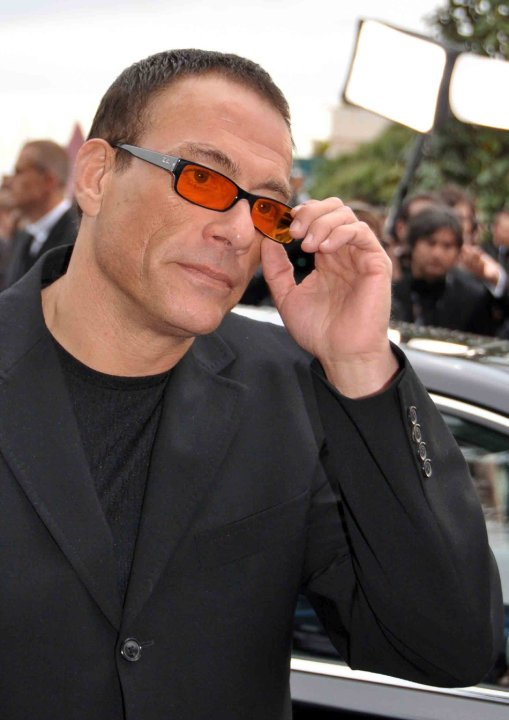
Van Damme in 2010

Original concept sketches for a proposed fighting game by artist John Tobias showed a character called "Michael Grimm, the current box office champion and star of such movies as Dragon's Fist, Dragon's Fist II and the award-winning Sudden Violence." Tobias later described them as "R-rated really schlocky 1980s martial arts films". According to martial artist Daniel Pesina, who portrayed Cage in the original game and the 1993 sequel Mortal Kombat II, Pesina used Iron Fist from the Power Man and Iron Fist comic series as the source of inspiration prior to the team settling on spoofing Van Damme.

Midway Games had hoped to license martial artist and actor Jean-Claude Van Damme for a fighting game that was intended to be modeled after Van Damme's 1988 film Bloodsport. The company created a short demo reel that consisted of film footage of Van Damme inserted into a digital background in order to convince the actor to join the project, an attempt that was unsuccessful. When the game later became Mortal Kombat, the Michael Grimm character was retained as a spoof of Van Damme and renamed Johnny Cage, with Van Damme's split-legged groin punch from Bloodsport consequently included as one of Cage's special moves. Mortal Kombat 1 would later feature a special skin for Cage featuring Van Damme's voice and likeness.

Cage's real name of John Carlton was taken from Midway artist and programmer John Carlton, who worked on the NBA Jam arcade game series. Cage was the first character created for Mortal Kombat, and the test prototype of the original game had just two Cage characters fighting each other. In a 1995 interview with Electronic Gaming Monthly, Tobias said that Cage's Fatality finishing move of punching off his opponent's head was the final one created for the game, before which he was going to simply throw his opponent across the screen.

As a narcissistic Hollywood star, Cage serves as comic foil in contrast to the games' more serious characters like Liu Kang and Raiden, which is embellished in the 2011 Mortal Kombat reboot game with a large chest tattoo of his name. Cage's main role in Mortal Kombat X is as a Special Forces consultant instead of an actor; his design by NetherRealm Studios (formerly Midway Games) was their attempt to define whether or not he had taken his martial arts skills seriously since the aftermath of the 2011 reboot game, and he was outfitted in tactical gear that was designed to fit his fighting style while finding the balance between "serious or stoic" and "too goofy". In Mortal Kombat X, Cage's gameplay style is split into three fighting variations like those of the other playable characters; Prima Games deemed him effective at zoning. (Note: A fighting game tactic in which players strategically keep opponents at a specific distance onscreen.) A female alternate universe variant of Johnny named Janet Cage appears in Mortal Kombat 1, initially as an NPC during the story mode before being added as a downloadable assist character, or "Kameo Fighter".

== Appearances ==
=== Mortal Kombat games ===
Introduced in Mortal Kombat (1992), Johnny Cage is a martial artist and actor who is tricked by the sorcerer Shang Tsung into entering the latter's Mortal Kombat tournament to prove that he does not rely on special effects in his films and improve his marketability. In the sequel Mortal Kombat II (1993), Johnny disappears from the set of his latest film to join Earthrealm's warriors, led by Mortal Kombat champion Liu Kang, in traveling to the otherworldly dimension of Outworld to compete in a second Mortal Kombat and save their world from Outworld tyrant, Shao Kahn.

While Cage does not appear in Mortal Kombat 3 (1995) and Ultimate Mortal Kombat 3, the 1996 compilation title Mortal Kombat Trilogy reveals he was killed by Shao Kahn's forces during the latter's invasion of Earthrealm and Johnny's journey to the afterlife was blocked due to the tyrant fusing Earthrealm with Outworld. Nonetheless, the merger restores Johnny's soul and allows him to help his allies defeat Shao Kahn once more before ascending to heaven. In Mortal Kombat 4 (1997), at Johnny's request, Raiden revives him so he can join his friends in fighting the disgraced former deity Shinnok.

In Mortal Kombat: Deadly Alliance (2002), Raiden recruits him for a new mission in Outworld. However, Johnny and his fellow Earthrealm warriors are killed while trying to stop the titular Deadly Alliance from resurrecting the Dragon King Onaga. In Mortal Kombat: Deception (2004), he and the Earthrealm warriors are resurrected and brainwashed by Onaga to serve as his slaves until they are eventually freed by reformed ninja Ermac and Liu Kang. Johnny returns in Mortal Kombat: Armageddon (2006), in which he participates in the titular Armageddon to claim the elemental Blaze's godlike power, only to be killed once more.

In Mortal Kombat (2011), due to Raiden altering the timeline to avert Armageddon, Johnny becomes a cocky and talkative martial arts actor and "a descendant of an ancient Mediterranean cult who bred warriors for the gods". Cage fights for Earthrealm's sake, reprising his early role but survives to Shao Kahn's invasion of Earthrealm alongside Sonya and the victorious Raiden. In Mortal Kombat X (2015),, Johnny inadvertently discovers his special powers while rescuing Sonya from Shinnok and assists Raiden in imprisoning Shinnok inside a magical amulet. Johnny and Sonya later get married and have a daughter, Cassie Cage, but they divorce due to Sonya's commitment to her career. A further twenty-five years later, Johnny joins a secret Special Forces unit under Sonya's command. Having inherited her father's powers, Cassie defeats Shinnok, and reunites the Cage family.

In Mortal Kombat 11 (2019), Johnny and Cassie grieve over Sonya's death following a Special Forces attack on the Netherrealm. After the keeper of time Kronika causes a time storm in an attempt to remove Raiden from history, past versions of Johnny and Sonya are brought to the present. Disgusted by his younger self's arrogance and misconduct around his version of Sonya, the present Johnny works with him to improve his attitude. Though the older Johnny successfully defends the Special Forces base from Kronika's forces, he is injured in battle, while his and Sonya's younger counterparts are kidnapped and forced to fight for the Black Dragon crime cartel's entertainment. After Cassie leads a Special Forces unit to rescue them, the younger Johnny becomes inspired to be more like his future self. In the DLC story expansion Aftermath, the younger Johnny is ambushed by Shao Kahn and Sindel, who take him and his family prisoner.

In Mortal Kombat 1 (2023), after Fire God Liu Kang creates a second new timeline while stopping Kronika, Johnny has become a powerless and struggling actor whose expensive lifestyle drives away his ex-wife, Christina, whom he married before becoming famous. Not long after, he is confronted by former yakuza member Kenshi Takahashi, who seeks one of his recent purchases and a sacred Takahashi family sword, Sento. Their fight is interrupted by Liu Kang, who recruits them to represent Earthrealm in the Mortal Kombat tournament. Though Raiden is chosen as champion, Liu Kang sends the remaining representatives to capture Shang Tsung. All throughout, Johnny films his exploits to use as inspiration for future film projects and bonds with Kenshi. After the latter loses his eyes while saving him from a Tarkat-infected Princess Mileena, Johnny eventually and willingly gives Sento to Kenshi in return. Following Shang Tsung's defeat, Johnny creates a multi-media franchise based on his adventures to gradually introduce Earthrealm to Outworld. In addition to the "prime" Johnny, Janet Cage of a gender-inverted timeline appears as a downloadable assist character, or "Kameo Fighter", while Lieutenant Colonel Johnathan Cage of a World War II-esque timeline appears in the Khaos Reigns DLC.

=== Other appearances ===
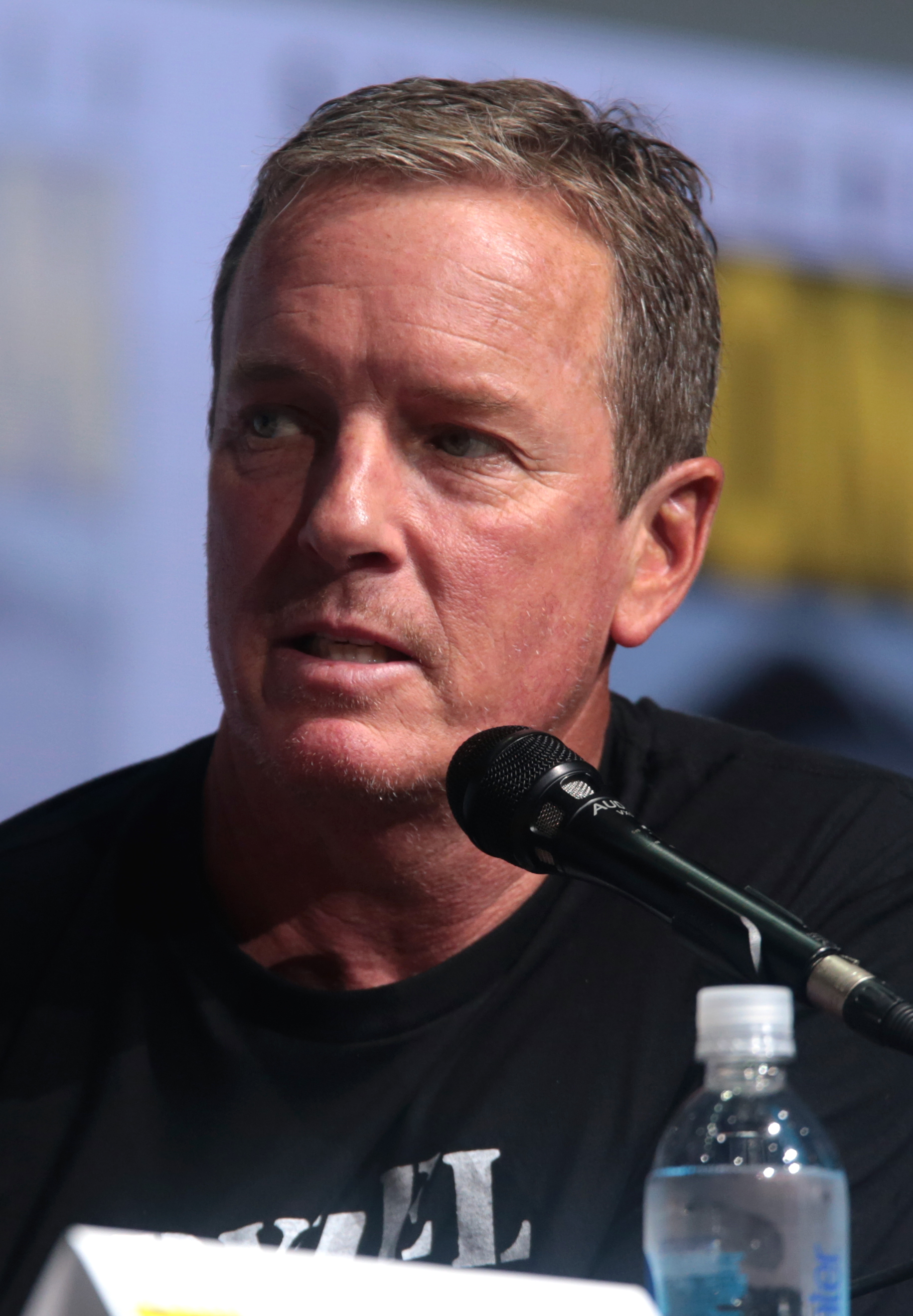
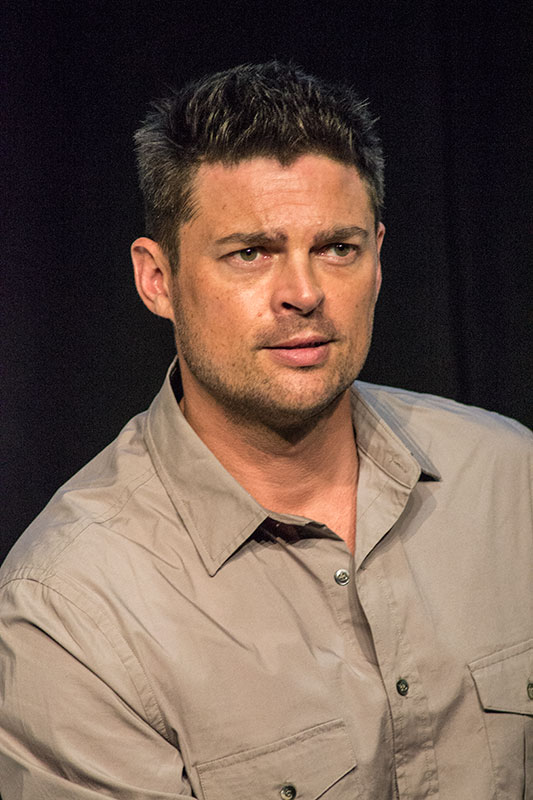
Linden Ashby and Karl Urban play Johnny Cage in Mortal Kombat (1995 film) and Mortal Kombat II respectively

Johnny Cage appears in Mortal Kombat (1995), portrayed by Linden Ashby. He, Liu Kang, and Sonya Blade are chosen by Raiden to participate in the eponymous tournament, with Johnny agreeing to prove himself as a legitimate fighter after being tricked by Shang Tsung. Johnny goes on to defeat Scorpion and Goro before Liu Kang replaces him in the final round. Additionally, Cage appears in the prequel Mortal Kombat: The Journey Begins.

Johnny Cage makes a minor appearance in Mortal Kombat Annihilation, portrayed by Chris Conrad. Amidst Shao Kahn's invasion of Earthrealm, Sonya is taken hostage. Johnny successfully saves her, but is killed by the tyrant in the process.

Ashby, who had practiced martial arts before he was cast in the role, would later lend his voice and likeness to a downloadable skin for Cage in Mortal Kombat 11. Pat E. Johnson, the first film's stunt choreographer, recommended Conrad as Ashby's replacement to Annihilation's producers.

Johnny Cage appears in Mortal Kombat: Rebirth, portrayed by Matt Mullins. This version is a faltering action star who works undercover for police officer Jackson Briggs before he is killed by Baraka.

Johnny Cage appears in Mortal Kombat: Legacy, portrayed again by Matt Mullins in the first season and Casper Van Dien in the second season. This version is an unemployed television actor who had previously starred in Mighty Morphin Power Rangers. In his self-titled episode, Cage, desperate to revive his flailing career, pitches reality show pilots that depict him engaging in vigilantism. However, he is rejected by two executives, one of whom would then steal his idea and pitch it to another actor. After assaulting the executive and two security guards, Shang Tsung approaches Cage to recruit him as a fighter for Outworld in the Mortal Kombat tournament. Cage declines before reluctantly joining Raiden's warriors in representing Earthrealm in the tournament. Van Dien compared his career trajectory to that of Cage in a 2013 interview with MTV.

Johnny Cage appears in Mortal Kombat Legends: Scorpion's Revenge (2020), Mortal Kombat Legends: Battle of the Realms (2021), and Mortal Kombat Legends: Cage Match, voiced by Joel McHale. While a supporting character in the first two films, the third sees him as the protagonist. A young Cage takes up martial arts while in school before traveling the world to train in various fighting styles and eventually becoming an action star after saving a Hollywood producer from a mugger. By the 1980s, Cage becomes embroiled in the Brotherhood of Shadows' plot to summon Shinnok and joins forces with his assistant Chuck Golden and demonness Ashrah to stop the cult.

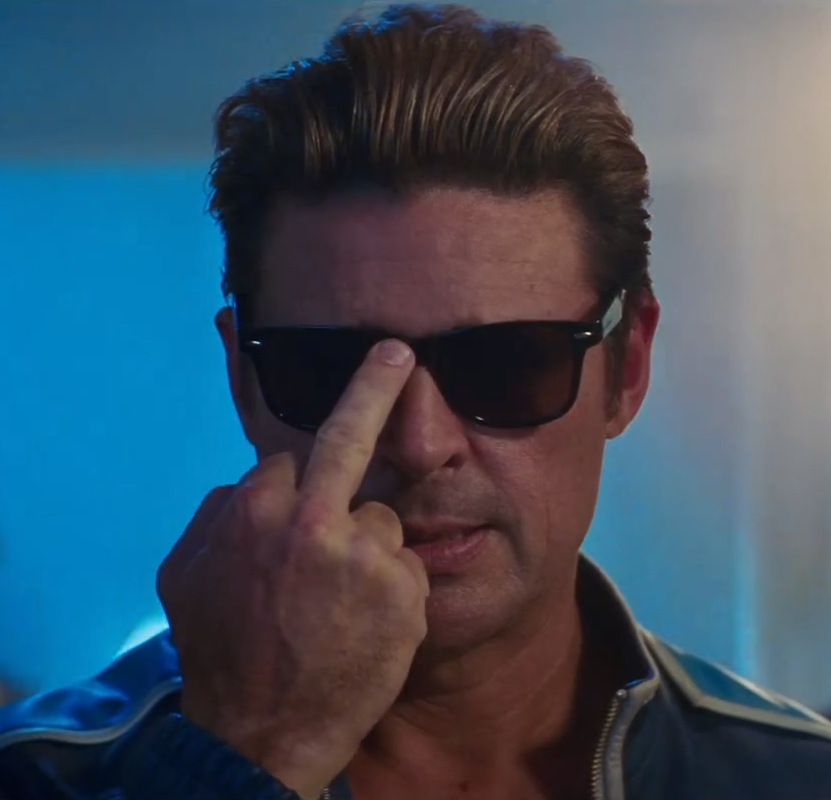
Karl Urban as Johnny Cage in Mortal Kombat II (2026)

While Johnny Cage was excluded from Mortal Kombat (2021), with director Simon McQuoid explaining that the main cast was already established when he had joined the production and feeling that Cage was "a very tricky, complex character" and a "big personality ... that has such a gravitational force around him [that] everything would have started to orbit around him", a reference to him appears at the end of the movie, when Cole Young (Lewis Tan) departs to scout more champions for Earthrealm, passing by the poster of a Cage movie, Citizen Cage, hinting at him being recruited in the future. Cage appeared as the secondary lead in Mortal Kombat II, portrayed by Karl Urban. In a fake trailer for a fictional 1990s Hollywood martial arts action film starring Johnny Cage called Uncaged Fury, as a teaser trailer for Mortal Kombat II, also reveals other films starring Johnny Cage, those being Cool Hand Cage, Hard to Cage, and Rebel Without a Cage. In the film, he is a washed up actor that peaked in the 90s who is reluctant to join Earthrealm's warriors, but discovers more about himself and his potential as he assists them in defeating Shao Kahn and Outworld.

Johnny Cage appears in Malibu Comics' Mortal Kombat comic book miniseries Mortal Kombat: Blood & Thunder (1994), which adapts the original game, and Mortal Kombat: Battlewave (1995), which sees Cage resuming his acting career before he and his personal bodyguard Bo join Jax Briggs in traveling to Outworld to investigate an attack carried out by Goro. He appears in DC Comics' Mortal Kombat X: Blood Ties, which is set before the events of the game.

=== Merchandise and promotion ===
Cage has been licensed for various action figures produced by Hasbro, Toy Island, and Jazwares. Advanced Graphics released a life-sized Cage cardboard standee in 2011, and Syco Collectibles released a polystone character statuette in 2012.

== Reception ==
Cage has been rated among the top Mortal Kombat characters by various gaming media publications, and his Fatality finishing moves over the course of his series appearances have been positively received. Brad Nicholson of Destructoid enthused in 2008 that Cage was "easily the best character in a fighting game ever." However, Shea Serrano of Grantland rated Cage as the second-worst of Mortal Kombat II's characters in 2012, on the basis of his skill being "overtaken almost entirely by his own ego."

Critical reception of Cage's characterization in the Mortal Kombat games and alternate media has been mixed. Chris Buffa of GameDaily wrote: "If you can't marry Brad Pitt, you can always settle for Mortal Kombat's Johnny Cage." GamesRadar considered Cage a combination of Jean-Claude Van Damme, Nicolas Cage, and Robert Downey, Jr. Writing for Complex, Elton Jones declared that Cage "embodies Hollywood's overpaid jerk persona perfectly," while Hanuman Welch considered Cage an exemplification of overconfidence and self-delusion, as well as a "spokesperson of the obnoxious Ed Hardy crowd." Mark Walton of GameSpot castigated Cage in the 2011 reboot game as sexist and arrogant. In their review of Mortal Kombat 11, the Washington Post enjoyed the interactions presented between the young and the old Cage as they gave elements that helped to make the narrative more appealing. Fans have praised Cage's gameplay, specifically his combos and sunglasses finishes in Mortal Kombat 1.

Gavin Jasper of Den of Geek praised Linden Ashby's performance in the first Mortal Kombat film as "a perfect idea of" Cage's personality. R. L. Shaffer of IGN was critical of Cage's "illogical character arc" as a former Power Rangers actor in Mortal Kombat: Legacy as he felt it was "disconnected" from Cage's role in the games, but Carl Lyon of Fearnet opined in his 2013 second-season review that Casper Van Dien's portrayal of the character made Cage "the loveable asshole we all know and love." In the upcoming Mortal Kombat 2 film, Bradley Russell of GamesRadar+ felt that Karl Urban's Johnny "is suitably obnoxious."
