= Before and After (film) =

- Theatrical release poster
- Directed by: Barbet Schroeder
- Screenplay by: Ted Tally
- Based on: Before and After by Rosellen Brown
- Produced by: Barbet Schroeder; Joe Roth; Susan Hoffman; Roger Birnbaum
- Starring: Meryl Streep; Liam Neeson; Edward Furlong; Alfred Molina
- Cinematography: Luciano Tovoli
- Edited by: Lee Percy
- Music by: Howard Shore
- Production companies: Hollywood Pictures; Caravan Pictures
- Distributed by: Buena Vista Pictures Distribution
- Release date: February 23, 1996
- Running time: 108 minutes
- Country: United States
- Language: English
- Budget: $35 million
- Box office: $15 million

Before and After is a 1996 American crime drama film based on Rosellen Brown's 1992 novel about two parents who must deal with the after effects when their son is accused of murder. The movie was directed by Barbet Schroeder and starred Meryl Streep as Dr. Carolyn Ryan, Liam Neeson as Ben Ryan, Edward Furlong as Jacob Ryan, and Julia Weldon as Judith Ryan (who also narrated the movie). Alfred Molina, John Heard, and Alison Folland appear in supporting roles.

Before and After was released by Buena Vista Pictures Distribution on February 23, 1996. The film received mixed to negative reviews from critics and was a box office bomb, grossing $15 million against a $35 million budget.

== Plot ==
In a small Western Massachusetts town, Dr. Carolyn Ryan and her sculptor husband Ben live with their two children Jacob and Judith. Their world is shattered when Sheriff Fran Conklin tells them that Martha Taverner has been killed and witnesses saw Jacob with her just before she died. When he asks to speak with Jacob, the family realizes that he's not in his room as they thought. Fran asks to look at Jacob's car, but Ben refuses. When Fran asks Judith where Jacob is, Ben demands the sheriff get a warrant.

When Fran leaves, Ben inspects Jacob's car, finding a pair of gloves and a car jack with blood on them. Ben burns the gloves, cleans the jack and tosses it with his art materials before the police return. When he tells Carolyn what he has done, she is afraid that Ben may have destroyed evidence that could help them find Jacob, as she is fearful that a maniac may have killed both Martha and her son. The Ryans plaster the town with signs trying to find Jacob, but the town ostracizes them, assuming Jacob is a murderer.

Postcards start to arrive from Jacob. Over the course of five weeks, he sends postcards from all over the country. Carolyn is convinced that he's been kidnapped and wants to alert the police. Ben remains wary of disclosing anything, insisting they must keep the postcards a secret. Eventually Jacob is caught in Boston and brought back home to stand trial. For the first several days, he is catatonic, only speaking aloud to enter his plea at the arraignment.

Jacob speaks to Judith in their treehouse when she asks him if he really traveled all over the country. He explained that he would take the train to the Boston airport once a week and press the postcards on people who were headed to the cities on the cards. He would explain that he had just returned from a vacation there but had forgotten to mail the postcards to his parents, and he did not want them to think he'd forgotten them. The travelers would mail the cards for him when they arrived at their destination.

The family receives a harassing phone call from one of the townspeople. Ben bitterly mocks the caller and offers an impassioned defense of his son. Touched by his father's sincerity, Jacob opens up and explains what happened: he had been fighting with Martha when she revealed that she was pregnant, in addition to the fact that she had been having sex with several other boys. They made up, but while they had sex in Jacob's car, they got snowed in. Unable to free the car through a variety of methods, they decided to try to jack one end of the car up while they packed snow under the other end. Their fight reignited and got violent. Martha swung a crowbar at Jacob and missed him by an inch. He charged at her, knocking her to the ground. She landed face first on the jack and was killed. Ben decides that it is best to not reveal the truth. He coaches Jacob on a different version of the story, which they tell to their lawyer, but the plan goes awry when Ben is deposed by the grand jury and realizes that there is no father-son privilege which exempts him from testifying. When Carolyn is called to testify, she reveals the truth. Jacob's lawyer is incensed, but he explains that he will simply treat Carolyn as a hostile witness and her testimony will amount to hearsay, since it conflicts with Jacob's account of the events.

When Ben discovers what Carolyn has done, he is furious. A family argument ensues and in the morning, Jacob is missing again. He turns up at the police station, where he has given a full confession. As a minor, he needs his parents to sign his confession. Ben refuses, explaining that he could never sign anything that took Jacob away from him.

Jacob is sentenced to five years for involuntary manslaughter, but is released after only two years with probation, and Ben is sentenced to almost one year for his cover up. The family relocates to Miami.

== Cast ==
- Meryl Streep as Dr. Carolyn Ryan
- Liam Neeson as Ben Ryan
- Edward Furlong as Jacob Ryan
- Alfred Molina as Panos Demeris
- Julia Weldon as Judith Ryan
- Daniel von Bargen as Fran Conklin
- Alison Folland as Martha Taverner
- John Heard as Wendell Bye
- Ann Magnuson as Terry Taverner
- Kaiulani Lee as Marian Raynor
- Larry Pine as Dr. Tom McAnally

== Production ==
The film was shot on location in Egremont, Massachusetts on Baldwin Hill East at the Rathbun Farm. Scenes were also filmed in and around Pittsfield, Lee, Great Barrington and Lenox. The court hearings were filmed at the Hampden County Hall of Justice in the Hampden County seat of Springfield, Massachusetts.

== Soundtrack ==
Before and After

Soundtrack album by Howard Shore
- Released: February 23, 1996
- Length: 41:10
- Label: Hollywood

Howard Shore chronology
Seven (1995)	Before and After (1996)	Crash (1996)

1. Main Title (4:01)
2. Searching for Clues (1:55)
3. Destroying Evidence (3:04)
4. Looking for Jacob (2:07)
5. First Postcard (1:48)
6. Dr. Ryan (0:51)
7. Apprehended (3:12)
8. Preliminary Hearing (1:04)
9. Ben & Carolyn (1:27)
10. Tree House (2:55)
11. The Confession (4:49)
12. The Grand Jury (1:46)
13. Carolyn (2:11)
14. It's Your Fault (1:54)
15. The Truth (1:41)
16. Jacob's Gone (2:00)
17. Before And After (4:16)

== Reception ==
=== Box office ===
Before and After was not successful financially, grossing only $8.8 million in the United States and Canada and $15 million worldwide against a production budget of $35 million.

=== Critical response ===
On Rotten Tomatoes, the film holds an approval rating of 35% based on reviews from 20 critics, with an average rating of 4.9/10. Audiences surveyed by CinemaScore gave the film a grade "C+" on scale of A to F.

Roger Ebert of the Chicago Sun-Times said, "Before and After is a long, slow slog through a story about a family crisis that is largely the fault of the family itself — especially the hot-tempered but loving father, who makes a series of crucial mistakes. It's one of those movies where you want to call out helpful advice to the screen, which would save the characters a lot of trouble."
