= Seven (soundtrack) =

Se7en (Original Motion Picture Soundtrack)

Soundtrack album by various artists
- Released: September 26, 1995
- Genres: Pop; rock
- Length: 57:08
- Label: TVT

Se7en (Original Motion Picture Soundtrack) is the soundtrack accompanying the 1995 film Seven (stylized as Se7en). It features songs from Marvin Gaye, Billie Holiday, Charlie Parker, The Statler Brothers and two instrumental cues from Howard Shore's score. The album released on September 26, 1995, by TVT Records in compact disc and cassette-tape formats. The album omits Coil and Danny Hyde's remixed version of Nine Inch Nails's song "Closer" (replacement for Shore's opening theme "The Last Seven Days") and David Bowie's song "The Hearts Filthy Lesson" played in the opening and end credits, respectively.

== Track listing ==
No.	Title	Artist(s)	Length
1.	"In The Beginning"	The Statler Brothers	2:22
2.	"Guilty"	Gravity Kills	4:05
3.	"Trouble Man"	Marvin Gaye	3:50
4.	"Speaking of Happiness"	Gloria Lynne	2:33
5.	"Suite No. 3 in D, BWV 1068: Air"	Stuttgarter Kammerorchester, Karl Munchinger	3:39
6.	"Love Plus One"	Haircut 100	3:38
7.	"I Cover The Waterfront"	Billie Holiday	3:20
8.	"Now's The Time"	Charlie Parker	4:16
9.	"Straight, No Chaser"	Thelonious Monk	9:38
10.	"Portrait Of John Doe"	Howard Shore	4:57
11.	"Suite From Seven"	Howard Shore	14:50
Total length:			57:08

== Original score ==
Shore recorded the film score with over 100 musicians at the Abbey Road Studios in London, which consists of brass, percussion, piano, and trumpets. The score was not officially released to the public, with a bootleg recording of the score published after the film's release. In September 2016, Howe Records released the complete score from the film as a part of their "collector's edition" in the seventh volume. WaterTower Music also included in their archive edition and released separately on October. The album featured 15 tracks from the original score as z runs for 61 minutes.

Track listing
No.	Title	Length
1.	"The Last Seven Days"	2:14
2.	"Gluttony"	5:44
3.	"Linoleum"	2:24
4.	"Somerset"	1:04
5.	"Greed"	3:39
6.	"Mrs. Mills"	1:05
7.	"Help Me"	3:31
8.	"Sloth"	5:29
9.	"Library"	2:19
10.	"John Doe"	6:02
11.	"Apartment #604"	4:15
12.	"Lust"	3:52
13.	"Pride"	4:01
14.	"The Wire"	3:15
15.	"Envy"	7:09
16.	"Wrath"	5:16
Total length:		61:19

== Reception ==
Writing for Filmtracks.com, Christian Clemmensen called the score as "a mind-numbing hour to tolerate on those longer presentations, one that requires extreme patience and an intellectual appreciation of an art form that can never yield a truly sane listening experience". Chris Hicks from Deseret News complimented it as an "eclectic mix" of tracks and also praised Shore's score as "eerie but listenable" giving three out of five to the album.

Shore was qualified as "runner-up" at the 1995 Los Angeles Film Critics Association Awards, and a nomination for Best Soundtrack at the 1996 Fangoria Chainsaw Awards.
