= Gravity Kills (album) =

Studio album by Gravity Kills
- Released: US March 5, 1996; Europe March 12, 1996
- Recorded: 1995–1996
- Studios: Mr. Blood, St. Louis and Battery Studios, New York
- Genre: Industrial rock
- Length: 39:13
- Label: TVT
- Producers: John Fryer, Gravity Kills

Gravity Kills chronology
Gravity Kills (1996)	Manipulated (1997)

Singles from Gravity Kills
- 1. "Guilty" Released: February 13, 1996; 2. "Enough" Released: 1996; 3. "Blame" Released: 1996; 4. "Down" Released: 1997

Professional ratings
Review scores
Source	Rating
AllMusic	4/5 stars
eMusic	4/0 stars
NME	1/10

Gravity Kills is the debut studio album by American industrial rock band Gravity Kills. It was released in 1996 on TVT Records. The album sold roughly 500,000 copies.

The first song was titled "Take" on the promo version of the album. It was renamed "Forward" just before the album was released.

The song "Blame" uses a sample from the song "Illusion", composed by the Japanese group Geinoh Yamashirogumi for the highly influential 1988 anime movie Akira.

== Album cover ==
The picture in the centre on the front cover is called "Picturing the Bomb". The image is owned by Rachel Fermi and Esther Samra.

== Track listing ==
All tracks are written by Gravity Kills.

No.	Title	Length
1.	"Forward"	1:31
2.	"Guilty"	4:02
3.	"Blame"	4:35
4.	"Down"	4:10
5.	"Here"	4:21
6.	"Enough"	4:17
7.	"Inside"	2:53
8.	"Goodbye"	3:12
9.	"Never"	3:10
10.	"Last"	3:14
11.	"Hold"	3:53

"Picturing the Bomb" image or drawing of a destroyed industry or building

== Videos ==
- "Guilty"
- "Enough" (Two versions)
- "Down" (w/ live footages) (Unreleased video)
- Blame (L.A. Remix version)

== In other media ==
- "Guilty" was featured in Seven (stylized as Se7en), a 1995 thriller film by David Fincher.
- "Last" was featured in a Doug Ellin's 1998 romantic comedy film, Kissing a Fool.
- A remix version of "Blame" was featured in the Escape from L.A. soundtrack.
- A demo version of "Goodbye" was featured in the 1995 action and adventure film, Mortal Kombat.

Appearances in video games

Year	Song	Games
1996	"Blame"	Test Drive Off-Road
1996	"Guilty"	Test Drive Off-Road
1996	"Enough"	Test Drive Off-Road
2000	"Guilty"	Vampire: The Masquerade – Redemption

== Personnel ==
Gravity Kills

- Jeff Scheel – lead vocals
- Matt Dudenhoeffer – guitars
- Doug Firley – keyboards
- Kurt Kerns – drums and bass

Production

- Produced by John Fryer and Gravity Kills
- Engineered by Tim Donovan
- Mixed by John Fryer
- Photography (Inner tray) by Rocky Morton
- Mastering by Howie Weinberg
- Written by Gravity Kills
- Design by Robin Glowski and Greg Knoll
- Artwork by Greg Knoll and Kurt Kerns

== Charts ==
=== Album ===
Chart (1996)	Peak position
US Heatseekers	1
US The Billboard 200	89

=== Singles ===
Year	Song	Chart	Peak position
1996	"Guilty"	US Mainstream Rock	39
1996	"Guilty"	US Billboard Hot 100	86
1996	"Guilty"	US Modern Rock	24
1997	"Guilty"	UK Charts	79
1997	"Enough"	UK Charts	109
