= Falling (Gravity Kills song) =

Single by Gravity Kills

from the album Perversion
- Released: 1998
- Recorded: 1997
- Genre: Industrial rock
- Length: 4:02 (Studio Album); 4:09 (CD Single); 4:00 (Instrumental)
- Label: TVT
- Songwriter: Gravity Kills
- Producers: Roli Mosimann, Gravity Kills

Gravity Kills singles chronology
| "Alive" (1998) | "Falling" (1998) | "One Thing" (2002) |

"Falling" is a song by industrial rock band Gravity Kills from the album Perversion, released by TVT Records in 1998.

== Release ==
"Falling" reached No. 35 on Billboard's Mainstream Rock chart on July 4, 1998. The song was included in both original and instrumental form in the 1998 cross-platform racing video game Test Drive 5.
