= Darlahood =

American rock band

- Origin: New York, New York, United States
- Genres: Rock
- Years active: 1995-1997
- Label: Reprise Records
- Past members: Luke Janklow; Joe Magistro; David Sellar
- Website: http://www.uelectric.com/dhood.html

Darlahood was an American rock band from New York City, active from 1995 to 1997. The band's lineup consisted of singer/guitarist Luke Janklow, drummer Joe Magistro, and bassist David Sellar.

Darlahood released one album, 1996's Big Fine Thing. Their song "Grow Your Own" peaked at #16 on Billboard's Mainstream Rock chart in December 1996.

== Biography ==
Shortly after forming, Darlahood received contract offers from several major record labels, before ultimately deciding on Reprise Records. During production of their debut album, the band travelled to Bearsville Studios in Bearsville, New York and Sound on Sound Studios in New York City to record with producers Clive Langer and Alan Winstanley, and mixer Bob Clearmountain.

Darlahood's debut album, Big Fine Thing, was released on October 22, 1996. The band's debut single, "Grow Your Own," received noticeable airplay, reaching the Top 20 on Billboard's Mainstream Rock chart. The second single, "Big Fine Thing," did not chart, but the music video, produced by Nigel Dick, received some airplay on MTV.

Darlahood's musical style was influenced by classic rock artists such as The Beatles, T. Rex, The Allman Brothers Band, Bad Company, and Aerosmith; and modern artists such as The Black Crowes, Trent Reznor and The Smashing Pumpkins.

In late 1996, Darlahood toured alongside Helmet, Danzig, and Gravity Kills before opening for Collective Soul in April and May 1997.
