= Molly Upton =

American painter, sculptor, and quilter (1953–1977)

- Born: Martha Neill Upton; September 30, 1953; Pittsfield, Massachusetts
- Died: March 30, 1977 (aged 23); San Francisco, California
- Education: Macalester College, University of New Hampshire
- Known for: Quilts, watercolors, sculpture

Martha Neill Upton (September 30, 1953, Pittsfield, Massachusetts – March 30, 1977, San Francisco, California) was a watercolorist, sculptor and studio quilt artist. Her quilted tapestries helped quilts become seen as fine art, rather than craft work, during the early 1970s. Her quilts were shown in the first major museum exhibition of non-traditional quilts, The New American Quilt at New York's Museum of Arts and Design, then called the Museum of Contemporary Craft, in 1976.

== Biography ==
Upton was born on September 30, 1953, in Pittsfield, Massachusetts. Her parents, James Gordon Upton and Barbara Allen Upton, moved to Darien, Connecticut in 1954. Her father was a graduate of the Princeton University in the Class of 1944 and a veteran of the United States Army Air Force as a C-47 pilot. After leaving the Air Force, he established a career in advertising and marketing in New York. Upton's mother graduated from Vassar College in 1943 with a degree in political science.

Upton attended the Hindley Elementary School (K-5) and the Thomas School (6-8) in Darien, Connecticut where she first met Susan Hoffman, who introduced her to quilting. She graduated from the Dana Hall School in Wellesley, Massachusetts in 1971 just prior to the July 1 opening of the exhibition Abstract Design in American Quilts at the Whitney Museum of American Art in New York. The exhibit was "regarded by most quilt scholars as instrumental in igniting the quilt renaissance of the 20th and 21st centuries. The exhibition elevated quilts to the same level as "high" art by presenting them on the walls of a prestigious art museum and by comparing their graphic and painterly qualities to those found in modern abstract art".

Upton attended Macalester College, for her freshman year in 1971 and 1972 and the University of New Hampshire during the Fall of 1972 and Fall 1973 as an art major. She spent the summer of 1972 in Weston, Vermont while Hoffman spent that summer in Dorset, Vermont. Upton and Hoffman worked as waitresses and also opened The Front Porch Out Back, a small barn shop near Upton's family's house in Weston and did a brisk business in mobiles, necklaces, and other handmade items.

In the Spring of 1973, Upton traveled extensively through Switzerland and Greece, living for a time with a Greek family. The influences for her piece Torrid Dwelling (1975) and Watchtower (1975) can be attributed to this period. During the Fall Semester of 1973, Upton decided to leave the University of New Hampshire and move to Cambridge, Massachusetts. Upton and Hoffman became roommates in an apartment there and pursued quiltmaking with the intent of securing a metropolitan art gallery showing.

Upton and Hoffman ignored the "great American quilt revival" trends in quilt making that had begun in the 1960s. Instead of replicating traditional quilting patterns, Upton and Hoffman, along with a handful of their contemporaries, began to synthesize a fine arts perspective with the quilt format. Their abstract "Quilted Tapestries" were original designs. They invited comparison of their work with contemporary art, and they asked art world prices for it. Their work coupled high standards of aesthetic quality with an uncompromising vision of its own value and importance.

Upton produced over 27 tapestries between 1974 and 1976. She moved to San Francisco between 1975 and 1976. In March 1977, she committed suicide by jumping from the Golden Gate Bridge.

== Quilted tapestries ==
Upton designed and created over 27 quilted tapestries between 1974 and 1977. She was 21 years old when she created her first quilt, Nocturn Regalis, and was 23 when she completed her last quilt, Alchemy.

These tapestries are notable for their abstract designs, unusual colors, and technical complexity. Upton abandoned the use of the grid structure and dismissed the use of a repeated block motif. Her piecework presents "a single carefully integrated overall image." Her unorthodox methods of working included using the floor surface as her design wall to compose her tapestries and binoculars held the reverse way to simulate a long view. Upton used any and every kind of fabric, without exception, if it served her purpose – corduroys, silk, linen, and velvet. In one of the few recorded statements from this young artist, Upton said she drew inspiration in part from "wandering through ruins, active streets and deserts; from past civilizations, and (from piano) keyboards."

In the first series of quilted tapestries,The Pairs Collection, Upton and Hoffman selected a "concept or aesthetic problem and then each made a quilt dealing with the problem in her own way". The first "Pairs" set was a black and white study, based on the gradation principles as seen in the "graphic traditions of calligraphy", juxtaposed against a second quilt with the same design principles portrayed in color.

== Early exhibitions ==
In 1975, the landmark "Quilts by Radka Donnell, Susan Hoffman, and Molly Upton" exhibit opened at the Carpenter Center for Visual Arts at Harvard University. This "marked the first time quilts had been featured in such a prestigious East Coast art gallery setting".

In December 1975, Arts Magazine published a full page announcement for the "Quilted Tapestries of Susan Hoffman and Molly Upton" exhibit opening at the Kornblee Gallery in New York City, November 25 – December 13, 1975 and included photographs of Upton's black and white Pine Winter and Hoffman's black and white Hourglass Infinity. They were "the first quiltmakers to be represented by a New York art gallery, and their quilts astonished many who saw them".

A review of this exhibit by Allen Ellenzweig appeared in Arts Magazine in February 1976. "Upton's color sense is stricter, more subdued. In three separate pieces, Watchtower, Note Motion and Construction, black and white or equivalent high-contrasting hues are used to specify the overall 'drawing'. In Construction, an overlapping cross-hatch plaid presents alternately advancing and receding spaces, akin to Vasarely optical play. Note Motion contains many forms that approximate musical notation and the Cubistic composition seems a reminder of Picasso's Three Musicians."

The exhibit was also reviewed by Ann-Sargent Wooster in the March 1976 issue of Artforum. "Upton's quilts rely on a greater light/dark contrast which is often used for an Op-art effect. Her work resembles one of the seldom mentioned but significant antecedents of this type of geometric abstraction – the "art" weavings and rugs produced by Anni Albers and others at the Bauhaus."

In that same year, Upton's Greek and Torrid Dwelling pieces were included in the juried exhibit Bed and Board – Contemporary Quilts & Woodwork at the DeCordova Museum (June 21 – September 28, 1975).

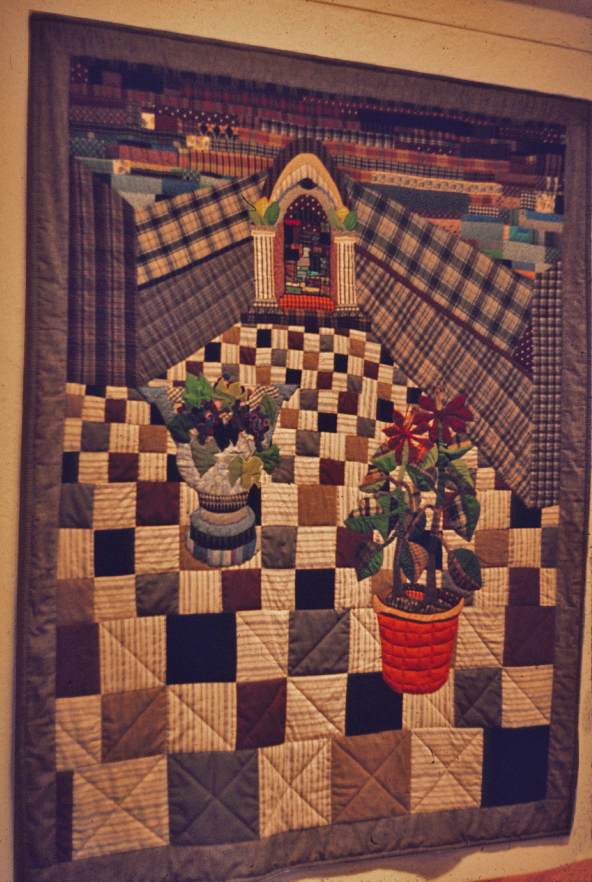
Installation view of Molly Upton's quilt "Greek" in 1975 exhibition BED & BOARD at the DeCordova Museum, Lincoln, MA

Upton was awarded a grant from the National Endowment for the Arts and was selected as one of ten artists to participate in the "Works in Progress" Program, demonstrating her work in City Hall, Boston and later exhibited at the Institute of Contemporary Arts in Boston.

== Legacy ==
In 1976 Upton's quilted tapestries were presented in the following exhibitions/venues:

- The New American Quilt, Museum of Contemporary Crafts, New York, NY
- The Da Ginza Museum, Tokyo, Japan
- Stedelijk Museum, Amsterdam, Holland
- Quilted Tapestries, Smith Anderson Gallery, San Francisco, CA
- The Art Quilt, sponsored by the Art Museum Association of America, Los Angeles Municipal Art Gallery, Los Angeles, CA. Opening October 1, 1976

The April 1976 issue of Craft Horizons, published Jean Libman Block's "A Quilt is Built", a review of the Museum of Contemporary Crafts exhibit that included a photograph of Upton's Pine Winter. Libman describes the exhibit as "a brilliant showing of contemporary quilts. Don't look for traditional motifs. If not exactly left behind, they have been exalted or transcended in an explosion of new techniques and images." This exhibit was additionally circulated by the Western Association of Art Museums.

In a review by Lisa Hammel for the New York Times entitled "Quilts: A Folk Idiom That Has Come of Age", Hammel writes about how the New American Quilt artists "have been stretching the limits of the folk idiom through new processes and new techniques, new images and new ideas, until they have come out at out at the other end with something totally individual – the quilt transcendent."

Upton's work was illustrated in the 1976 book by Beth and Jeffrey Gutcheon: The Quilt Design Workbook.

Torrid Dwelling, considered Upton's groundbreaking work, was selected as one of the 100 Best Quilts of the 20th Century in 1999 through a collaboration between Quilter's Newsletter Magazine, the International Quilt Festival, Quiltmaker and McCall's. A book of these quilts was published by Quilters Newsletter, and a museum quality exhibition was held at the International Quilt Festival in 1999. A PBS Documentary was created from this event.

Upton described her creative aesthetic when she spoke about Torrid Dwelling: "I first conceived of Torrid Dwelling with no people-a riddle of rocks as a symbol of civilization." Later, midway through construction, she "included a couple of men and a chicken, as a conscious but hidden clue that the landscape could still support man. But the irregular and often illogical juxtaposition of the stones make it active and puts it in motion, suggesting an impending change-even ruin."

Upton was recognized in her brief lifetime as an extraordinary creative force – a visionary. Her tapestries are considered benchmarks for what is recognized today as pure art: "any art form that is considered to have purely aesthetic value". Upton once said: "As for the work independent, finally of itself, it perceives nothing, only exists; a reference point, a spiritual counterpart, belonging at once to no one and everyone. It is the final collection of evidence of the active creation that took place while it was waiting to be finished."

== Works ==
Works of art:

- 1974: Nocturn Regalis, Bordering on Humor, Greek, Midnight Gardeners, Pine Winter, Summer Pine, Reclining Tigress, Forest Fire, Blades, Caw-Caw, Caw
- 1975: Torrid Dwelling, Note Motion, Fanfare, Construction, Watchtower, Symbol: Self-Portrait Without a Mirror, Chickens
- 1976: Ionic, Bolt, The Overcoat ("Molly, in creating this piece, was inspired by Gogol's short story. 'The Overcoat.' The image of the man running is the artist's variation on the central figure of Lyonel Felninger's painting, Street in Paris ('Pink Sky')." Trip Around the Block, Tropical, George Washington, Lion Man, HotCoal/Cool Jazz, Alchemy

== Posthumous exhibits ==
Posthumous exhibits of Upton's work include:

- Quilted Tapestries of Molly Upton, Waveny Carriage Barn, New Haven, Connecticut, December 3–17, 1978 (This was the first exhibit of Upton's collected works on the east coast after her death. Reviews of this exhibit were published by Beth Gutcheon and Susan Hoffman)
- Quilted Wall Tapestry Exhibit by Darien's Susan Hoffman and Molly Upton, Bethel Gallery, Bethel, Connecticut, February 18 – March 4, 1979
- New England Images, Topsfield Fair Grounds, Topsfield, Massachusetts, June 8 – 19, 1983
- 100 Best Quilts of the 20th Century - International Quilt Festival, Houston, Texas– October 1999
- Molly Upton, Vermont Quilt Festival, Northfield, Vermont, Spring 2000
- Quilted Tapestries by Molly Upton '71, Dana Hall School, Wellesley, Massachusetts, January 9 – February 11, 2000
- Last Quarter, Twentieth Century, New England Quilt Museum –2000
- Two Visionaries: Francis Abel Brand and Molly Upton, National Quilt Museum, Paducah, Kentucky October 26, 2002 – March 8, 2003
