= Susan Hoffman =

Susan Hoffman is an American quilt artist.

== Life ==
She began quilting while still in high school, and with her friend and fellow quilt artist Molly Upton, opened a small shop to sell artwork in her hometown in Vermont. Hoffman attended college at the University of Denver. Hoffman and Upton lived as roommates in Cambridge, Massachusetts after college, and began quilting together, making related quilts that they eventually termed "the pair collection." In 1975, their Third Pair—Hoffman's "Moonlit" and Upton's "Greek"—were selected for inclusion in a Japan installation of the seminal 1971 Whitney Museum exhibition curated by Jonathan Holstein, Abstract Design in American Quilts.

Beginning in the mid-1970s, Hoffman and Upton were represented by the Kornblee Gallery, known in the 1960s and 1970s for representing young artists who went on to great prominence. They were the first quilt artists to be represented by a New York gallery. Their 1975 exhibition received favorable reviews, including one by Ann-Sargent Wooster in Artforum, who noted Hoffman's "concern with subtleties of color" and her use of "units of cloth for chromatic abstractions similar to those of the German expressionists and Kupka."

== Exhibitions ==
- Abstract Design in American Quilts, Japan, 1975
- The New American Quilt, Museum of Contemporary Crafts, New York, 1976
- Quilts by Radka Donnell, Susan Hoffman, and Molly Upton, Carpenter Center for the Arts, Harvard University, Cambridge, MA 1975
- Joint show with Molly Upton, Kornblee Gallery, New York, NY, 1976
- Solo Exhibition, Kornblee Gallery, New York, NY, 1980
- Peter Hoffman & Susan Hoffman, Southern Vermont Art Center, 2018
- The Quilted Canvas II, New England Quilt Museum, Lowell, MA 2018
