= Rosellen Brown =

American novelist (born 1939)

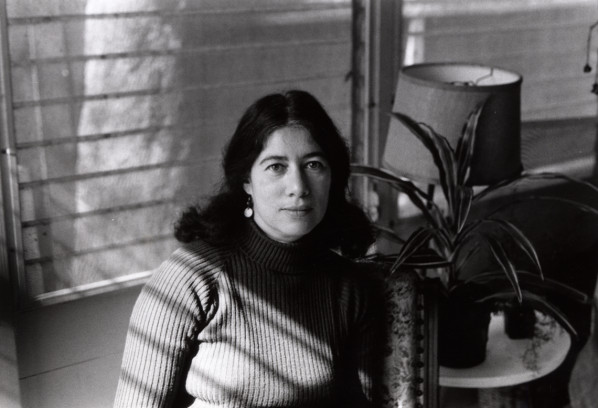
- Rosellen Brown
- Born: May 12, 1939 (age 87); Philadelphia, Pennsylvania, U.S.
- Education: Barnard College; Brandeis University
- Occupation: Author
- Writing career
- Language: English
- Genres: novels, poems, short stories
- Notable awards: Janet Heidinger Kafka Prize

Rosellen Brown (born May 12, 1939) is an American author, and has been an instructor of English and creative writing at several universities, including the School of the Art Institute of Chicago and the University of Houston. The 1996 film Before and After was adapted from her novel of the same name.

== Early life ==
Brown was born in Philadelphia, Pennsylvania. She received a Bachelor of Arts degree from Barnard College in 1960 and Brandeis University.

== Life and work ==
She has been an instructor of English and creative writing at several universities, including the School of the Art Institute of Chicago and the University of Houston.

The TV adaptation Half A Heart was based on Brown's book of the same name which traces the lives of several people who participated in the civil rights movement and continue to live in its shadow. Before and After was released as a film in 1996. Starring Liam Neeson and Meryl Streep, it was directed by Barbet Schroeder from a screenplay by Ted Tally.

== Publications ==
- Some Deaths in the Delta and Other Poems, 1970
- Whole World Catalog, Teachers and Writers Collaborative, 1972 (co-editor)
- Street Games (stories), 1974; 1991
- The Autobiography of My Mother (novel), 1976
- Cora Fry (poems), 1977
- Tender Mercies (novel), 1978
- The Secret Garden (play adaptation of the novel), 1983
- Civil Wars (novel), 1984
- Before and After, 1992
- A Rosellen Brown Reader: Selected Poetry and Prose, 1992
- Inter-Office (short story), 1994
- Cora Fry's Pillow Book (poetry), 1994
- Half a Heart (novel), 2000
- The Lake on Fire (novel), 2018

== Awards ==
- Janet Heidinger Kafka Prize

== See also ==
- History of the Jews in Houston
