= Perversion (album) =

Studio album by Gravity Kills
- Released: June 9, 1998
- Recorded: Mr. Blood, Upper Room Studios, St. Louis
- Genres: Industrial rock, industrial metal
- Length: 40:45 (U.S.); 40:50 (UK)
- Labels: TVT (U.S.); Dragnet Records (Germany)
- Producers: Roli Mosimann, Gravity Kills

Gravity Kills chronology
Manipulated (1997)	Perversion (1998)	Superstarved (2002)

Singles from Perversion
- 1. "Alive" Released: 1998; 2. "Falling" Released: 1998

The US packaging for meat image was used in album's artwork.

Perversion is a 1998 album by industrial rock band Gravity Kills. It was released on June 9, 1998, through TVT Records.

== Background ==
During an online chat session on April 17, 2000, the band disclosed that the title of the album was originally going to be 'Whore', and after their record label pushed back, the title was changed to 'Perversion' two days before the CDs went into production. They also stated that the actual title of the tenth track, 'Belief', is simply the word itself, and the '(To Rust)' was the result of a misprint during the cover art's production process. The album art features a scan of an instructions sheet on safe handling of meat and poultry. The inner sleeve features a double-spread image of the band in a room occupied by pigs; vocalist Jeff Scheel is tied to a chair while rapidly shaking his head, while the other band members are stood next to a table with headphones on. A red neon sign is affixed to the wall behind them, displaying seemingly nonsensical white Japanese text.

== Promotion ==
A promotional CD was released under the same name in early 1998, containing all of the album's tracks. "Drown" was retitled as "Drowned" or "Drowning" depending on the pressing. After being approached by TVT Records, American cosmetics brand Urban Decay released a nail polish as a promotional tie-in product for the album. The polish, titled 'Perversion', was a glossy black color and was given away for free with each copy of the album bought from various outlets. Vocalist Jeff Scheel said of the collaboration, "I think it fits in with most rock bands because there's this marriage between rock music and fashion anyway. And guys wear [nail polish]. Anyway, I will be wearing it." The color became a staple until Urban Decay discontinued their nail range.

== Reception ==
Professional ratings
Review scores
Source	Rating
AllMusic	2.5/5 stars
eMusic	4/5 stars
Spin	3/10

Perversion was met with mixed reviews and ratings. Allmusic gave the album 2.5/5, eMusic gave it a 4/5 and MOG gave it 3/5. It reached #107 on the Billboard 200. Reviewing the album for Spin, Joshua Westlund commented that the band was recreating Nine Inch Nails's song "Head Like a Hole" and stated, "Gravity Kills songs have no subjects because pronouns don't matter to singer Jeff Scheel; the charges against "you" in the first verse always come back as revelations about "me" in the second. Lust, disgust, and ennui sound like the same numb sensation in GK's music. Which might explain why "darkness" has seldom sounded so gray."

== Chart positions ==
=== Album ===
Country	Chart (1998)	Peak position
U.S.	Billboard 200	107

=== Singles ===
Country	Chart (1998)	Title	Peak position
U.S.	Mainstream Rock	Falling	35

== Compilation-promo appearances ==
Some of the songs appeared in some compilation volumes and promos:

Year	Song	Compilations/promos
1999	Drown	Crossing All Over, Vol. 9
1999	Alive (Hurricane Mix)	Offroad Tracks Vol.16
1999	If (Compound Remix)	TVT Warped '99
1999	Alive	Creed on (CD Sampler)
-	Falling	Virtually Alternative 92

== Media appearances ==
"Drown" and "Alive" were featured in Test Drive: Off-Road 2. "Falling" was featured in Test Drive 5. "If" was featured in MTV Sports: Pure Ride.

== Track listing ==
No.	Title	Length
1.	"Falling"	4:02
2.	"If"	4:06
3.	"Crashing"	3:40
4.	"Drown"	3:40
5.	"Alive"	3:52
6.	"Wanted"	4:04
7.	"Always"	4:44
8.	"One"	3:46
9.	"Disintegrate"	4:40
10.	"Belief (To Rust)"	4:16

Japanese Bonus track
No.	Title	Length
11.	"Poetry and Power (from the Gary Numan tribute CD)"	3:19

Unidentified bonus track
No.	Title	Length
12.	"Alive (Hurricane Mix)"	3:36

Various – industrial bonus track
No.	Title	Length
12.	"Enough [Mix]"

== Personnel ==
Gravity Kills

- Jeff Scheel - Lead vocals
- Matt Dudenhoeffer - Guitar
- Doug Firley - Keyboard and Bass
- Kurt Kerns - Drums and Bass

Production

- Produced by Roli Mosimann and Gravity Kills
- Engineered by Doug Firley and Federico Panero
- Mixed by Gary Townsley and East Side Sound
- Written by Gravity Kills
- Photos by Joseph Cultice
- Package Design by David Lau
