= Superstarved =

Studio album by Gravity Kills
- Released: United States March 19, 2002; England April 15, 2002; Japan April 10, 2002
- Recorded: June 1999 – October 16, 2001
- Studios: The Mattress Factory and ASI Chicago, Mr. Blood, St Louis
- Genres: Industrial metal, nu metal
- Length: USA 46:20; UK 46:38
- Labels: USA Sanctuary Records; UK Mayan / Sanctuary Records; Japan Victor Entertainment
- Producers: Martin Atkins, Gravity Kills

Gravity Kills chronology
Perversion (1998)	Superstarved (2002)

Singles from Superstarved
- 1. "One Thing" Released: 2002; 2. "Love, Sex, and Money" Released: 2002; 3. "Personal Jesus" Released: 2003

Professional ratings
Review scores
Source	Rating
Allmusic	3/5 stars
Sputnikmusic	3/5 stars

Superstarved (stylized as superstarved★ or superstarved*) is the third studio album by Gravity Kills, released March 19, 2002. It is the only album to feature drummer Brad Booker. The album is described as "more riff-oriented" and "grindier" and shares similarities to nu metal music.

== Production ==
The band signed with major record label Sanctuary Records in New York in March 2000 before the release. According to guitarist Matt Dudenhoeffer, approximately 30 songs were written for the album, of which about 12 were likely make it to the finished album. "Eclipse", "Shake", "Photograph", "Monsters & Astronauts", "Naked", and "Hollow" were going to be on the album, but ended up not being included. Jason Slater was going to be producing the album, but did not. The band originally recorded the cover version of Depeche Mode's "Personal Jesus" in 1999, then released it in 2002. The album was produced with a more mainstream nu-metal crossover sound and features more guitars, the inclusion of turntables and pseudo-rapped vocals on some tracks.

== Songs ==
"Love, Sex, and Money" was the last song written for the album. The video for the song was in shot in Seattle, San Francisco and Chicago with live footage of the band performing on the Superstarved Tour.

Jeff Scheel says that "Forget Your Name" was his first experiment from switching from Digital Performer to Logic Audio. It was described by a reviewer as an "angst ridden 'love song' in the loosest sense."

"Beg and Borrow" is the most emotional song on the album. Scheel describes it as lonely, emotional and desperate. On August 18, 2011, Scheel uploaded his piano cover of "Beg and Borrow" on SoundCloud as a free download. This was the first time in nine years that he had created a studio song and a studio cover.

== Track listing ==
No.	Title	Length
1.	"Love, Sex, and Money"	3:40
2.	"Take It All Away"	3:49
3.	"Fifteen Minutes"	2:47
4.	"Forget Your Name"	3:56
5.	"Enemy"	3:42
6.	"Breakdown"	3:27
7.	"Beg and Borrow"	4:21
8.	"One Thing"	3:51
9.	"Personal Jesus"	3:14
10.	"Wide Awake"	4:07
11.	"Suffocate"	3:59
12.	"Superstarved"	3:27
13.	"LS&M Reprise"	2:10

Best Buy bonus track
No.	Title	Length
14.	"Love, Sex, and Money" (Joolz Club Mix)	7:50

== Album's cover art and name ==
The star on the album's cover is in connection with the album's name, "superstarved", which designer Craig Wagner created for Gravity Kills' album. The word refers to the condition of extreme malnutrition. The name came from a comment on what the band went through changing record labels between their second and third albums.

== Personnel ==
Gravity Kills

- Jeff Scheel - lead vocals
- Matt Dudenhoeffer - guitar
- Doug Firley - keyboard, bass
- Brad Booker - drums

Additional musicians

- Julian Beeston - programming
- Matt Dudenhoeffer - backing vocals on "Fifteen Minutes"
- Richard Fortus - guitars on "Wide Awake" and "One Thing"
- Charles Levi - bass on "Superstarved"
- Derek Geisser - guitar on "Enemy"
- Bob Dog Caitlin - sitar on "Take It All Away"

Production

- Produced by Martin Atkins and Gravity Kills
- Engineered by Julian Beeston
- Mixed by Julian Beeston and Martin Atkins, except "One Thing" (Chris Greene and Martin Atkins) at ASI Chicago
- Written by Gravity Kills, except "Personal Jesus" (Martin L. Gore) and "Wide Awake" (Gravity Kills and Richard Fortus)
- Photos by Steve Truesdell
- Gravity Kills logo and star designed by Craig Wagner
- Artwork and design by John Bergin
