= Seven (1995 film) =

1995 film by David Fincher

- Theatrical release poster
- Directed by: David Fincher
- Written by: Andrew Kevin Walker
- Produced by: Arnold Kopelson; Phyllis Carlyle
- Starring: Brad Pitt; Morgan Freeman; Gwyneth Paltrow; John C. McGinley
- Cinematography: Darius Khondji
- Edited by: Richard Francis-Bruce
- Music by: Howard Shore
- Production company: Arnold Kopelson Productions
- Distributed by: New Line Cinema
- Release date: September 22, 1995
- Running time: 127 minutes
- Country: United States
- Language: English
- Budget: $33–34 million
- Box office: $327.3 million

Seven (often stylized as Se7en) is a 1995 American crime thriller film directed by David Fincher and written by Andrew Kevin Walker. It stars Brad Pitt and Morgan Freeman, with Gwyneth Paltrow and John C. McGinley in supporting roles. Set in an unnamed, crime-ridden city, the narrative follows disenchanted, nearly retired Detective Lieutenant William Somerset (Freeman) and his newly transferred partner David Mills (Pitt) as they try to stop a serial killer from committing a series of murders based on the seven deadly sins.

Walker, an aspiring writer, based Seven on his experiences of moving from a suburban setting to New York City during a period of rising crime and drug addiction in the late 1980s. An Italian film company optioned his script, but following financial difficulties, the rights were sold to New Line Cinema. Studio executives were opposed to the script's bleak conclusion, insisting on a more mainstream and optimistic outcome. Fincher, determined to re-establish himself after a career setback with his directorial debut Alien 3 (1992), was mistakenly sent Walker's original script and, convinced of its merit, committed to directing the project if the original ending remained intact. Principal photography took place in Los Angeles between December 1994 and March 1995, on a $33–34 million budget.

Seven garnered middling test audience results and was not predicted to perform well due to its violent and mature content. However, it grossed $327 million worldwide, becoming a sleeper hit and the seventh highest-grossing film of the year. Contemporaneous reviews were generally positive, praising the performances of the central cast and the ending. Seven revitalized Fincher's career and helped Pitt move from roles based on his appearance to more serious, dramatic roles.

In the years since its release, the critical reception has been more positive. The film has inspired a number of television series and films with its aesthetic, music, and premise. Its title sequence, which depicts the killer preparing for his actions in the film, is considered an important design innovation that sparked a renewed interest in title design, while the film's twist ending has been named as one of the most shocking and unforgettable in cinematic history.

== Plot ==
In a city overcome with violent crime and corruption, disillusioned police Detective Lieutenant William Somerset is one week from retirement. He is partnered with David Mills, a young, short-tempered, idealistic detective who recently relocated to the city with his wife, Tracy.

On Monday, Somerset and Mills investigate an obese man who was forced to eat until his stomach burst, killing him. Somerset finds the word "gluttony" written on a wall. Somerset, considering the case too extreme for his last investigation, asks to be reassigned, but his request is denied. The following day, another victim, who had been forced to cut a pound of flesh from his body, is found; the crime scene is marked "greed". Clues at the scene lead Somerset and Mills to the sloth victim, a drug-dealing pederast whom they find emaciated and restrained to a bed. Photographs reveal the victim was restrained for precisely one year. Somerset surmises the murders are based on the Christian concept of the seven deadly sins.

Tracy invites Somerset to share supper with her and Mills, helping the detectives overcome their mutual hostility. On Friday, Tracy meets privately with Somerset because she has no other acquaintances in the city. She reveals her unhappiness at moving there, especially after learning she is pregnant, and believes the city is an unfit place to raise a child. Somerset sympathizes with Tracy, having persuaded his former girlfriend to abort their child for similar reasons and regretting it ever since. He advises Tracy to inform Mills of the pregnancy only if she intends to keep the child.

A remark by Mills inspires Somerset to research libraries for anyone checking out books based on the seven deadly sins, leading the pair to the apartment of a man known only as John Doe. Unexpectedly, Doe returns home and is pursued by Mills. Doe incapacitates him by striking him with a tire iron and holds him at gunpoint, but chooses to leave him alive and flees. The police investigate the apartment, finding thousands of notebooks and photographs of his victims; the cache includes images of Somerset and Mills by a person they believed was an intrusive journalist at the sloth crime scene. Doe calls the apartment and speaks of his admiration for Mills.

On Saturday, Somerset and Mills investigate the fourth victim, lust, a prostitute who had been raped with a custom-made, bladed strap-on by a man held at gunpoint. The following day, the pride victim is found: a model whom Doe had facially disfigured. Unable to live without her beauty, she killed herself.

As Somerset and Mills return to the police station, Doe arrives covered in blood and surrenders himself. He threatens to plead insanity at his trial, potentially escaping punishment, unless Mills and Somerset escort him to an undisclosed location where they will find the envy and wrath victims. During the drive, Doe says he believes God has chosen him to send a message about the ubiquity of sin and society's apathy towards it. He is without remorse, believing the murders will force society to pay attention to him.

Doe leads the detectives to a remote location outside the city, where a delivery van approaches. Somerset intercepts the vehicle, whose driver was instructed to deliver a package to Mills at this specific time and location. He is horrified at the package's contents and tells Mills to put down his gun.

Doe reveals he himself represents envy because he envied Mills' life with Tracy and implies the package contains her severed head. He urges Mills to become wrath, telling him Tracy begged for her life and that of her unborn child, and takes pleasure in realizing Mills was unaware of her pregnancy. Despite Somerset's pleas, Mills, distraught and enraged, shoots Doe dead, completing Doe's plan. Police remove the catatonic Mills, and Somerset tells his captain he will "be around". Somerset says in voiceover: "Ernest Hemingway once wrote: 'The world is a fine place, and worth fighting for.' I agree with the second part."

== Cast ==
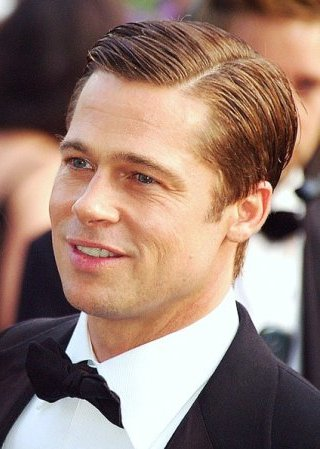
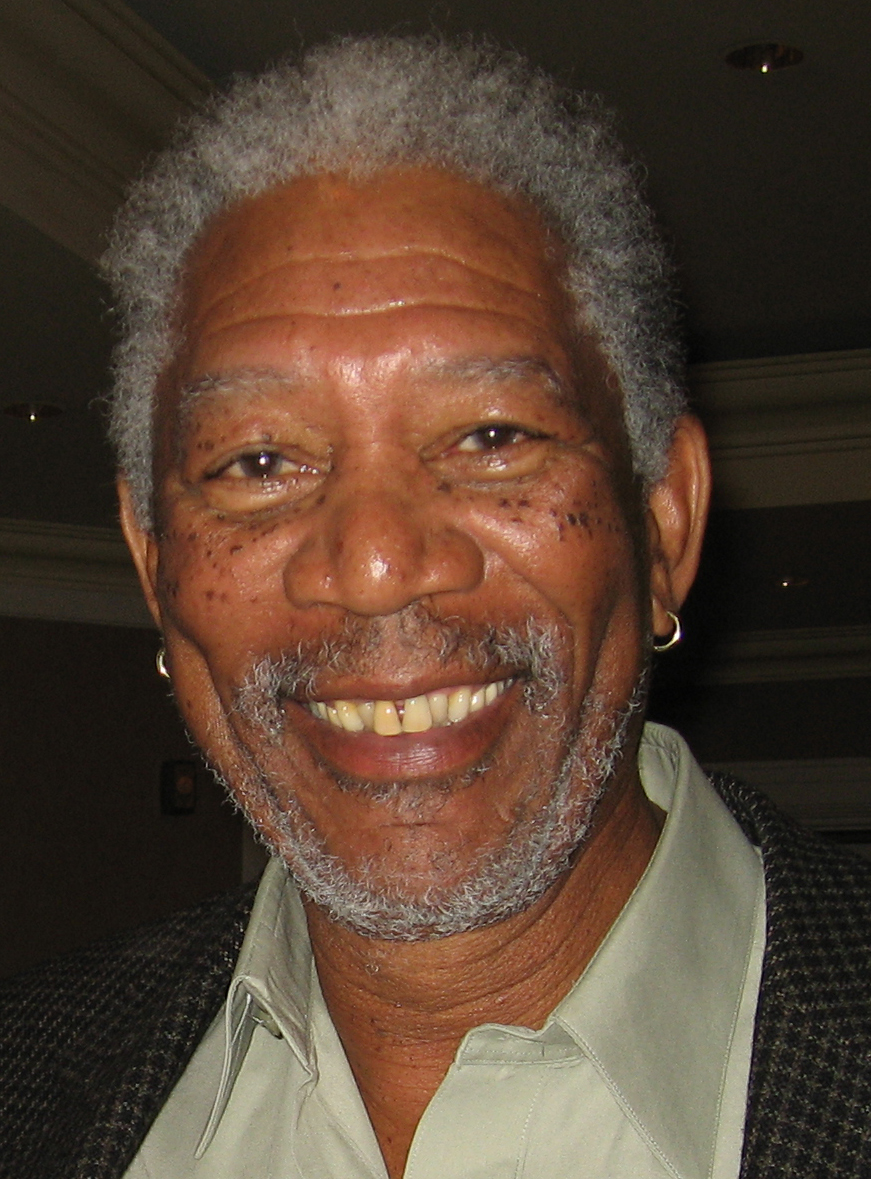
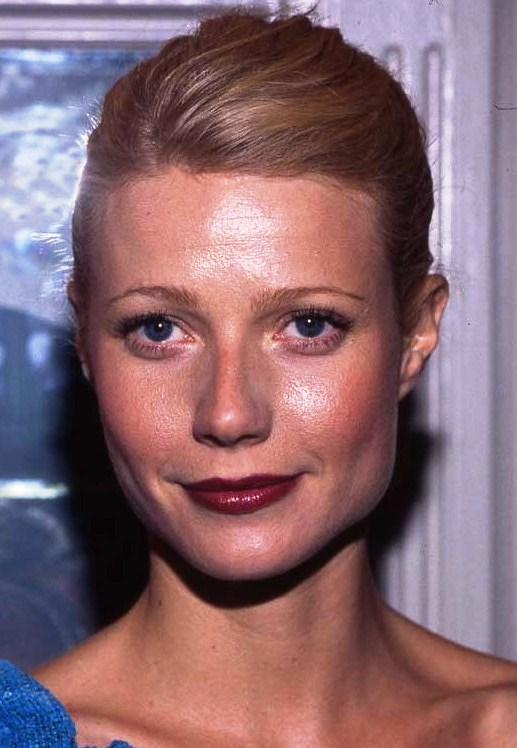
Brad Pitt (pictured in 2007), Morgan Freeman (2006), and Gwyneth Paltrow (2000)
- Brad Pitt as David Mills: A well-meaning but impulsive homicide detective
- Morgan Freeman as William Somerset: A veteran police Detective Lieutenant disillusioned with his job
- Gwyneth Paltrow as Tracy Mills: Detective Mills' lonesome wife
- Richard Roundtree as Martin Talbot: The district attorney
- R. Lee Ermey as the police captain: The detectives' grizzled superior
- John C. McGinley as California: A SWAT team leader
- Kevin Spacey as John Doe: A serial killer inspired by the seven deadly sins

Seven also features Julie Araskog as Mrs. Gould, John Cassini as Officer Davis, Reg E. Cathey as Doctor Santiago, Peter Crombie as Doctor O'Neil, Richard Portnow as Doctor Beardsley, Richard Schiff as Mark Swarr, and Mark Boone Junior as a "greasy FBI man". Hawthorne James appears as George, the library night guard, Michael Massee portrays "man in massage parlor booth", Leland Orser plays "crazed man in massage parlor" forced to kill the "lust" victim, Pamala Tyson portrays a thin vagrant outside Doe's apartment, and Richmond Arquette plays Doe's delivery man.

Doe's victims include: Bob Mack as gluttony, a morbidly obese man who is force-fed until his stomach bursts; Gene Borkan as greed victim Eli Gould, a criminal attorney who is forced to cut off his own flesh; and Michael Reid MacKay as the sloth victim Theodore "Victor" Allen, a drug dealer and child abuser. Cat Mueller portrays the lust victim, a sex worker who is impaled with a bladed sex toy, and Heidi Schanz appears as model Rachel Slade, pride, whom Doe disfigures. Writer Andrew Kevin Walker makes a cameo appearance as a corpse Somerset investigates during the film's opening scene; Freeman's son Alfonso appears as a fingerprint technician; and columnist George Christy portrays the police department janitor scraping Somerset's name from his door.

== Production ==
=== Writing ===
In 1986, aspiring screenwriter Andrew Kevin Walker moved from suburban Pennsylvania to New York City and experienced culture shock while living in a city undergoing significant increases in crime and drug abuse. While working as a sales assistant at Tower Records in 1991, Walker began writing a spec script titled Seven, set in an unnamed, bleak city inspired by his "depressing" time in New York. (Note: Attributed to multiple references:) Walker said, "it's true that if I hadn't lived there I probably wouldn't have written Seven ..." Film studios were eager for high concept spec scripts—simple, succinct ideas that could be easily marketed to audiences. Walker believed his thriller about police officers pursuing a serial killer inspired by the seven deadly sins would attract attention and help launch his professional writing career.

Walker deliberately left aspects of the narrative open to interpretation to avoid invalidating the audience's own conclusions. He also wanted to subvert expectations and leave viewers feeling "violated and exhausted" by the ending. According to Walker, "there's lots of evil out there, and you're not always going to get the satisfaction of having any sort of understanding of why that is. That's one of the things that scares people the most about serial killers". In developing the killer, Walker drew on his experiences walking through the city and witnessing crimes and sins openly around him, which led him to consider a character who deliberately fixated on such behavior. He had Doe surrender to the police to deny both the characters and audience the expected satisfaction of his capture, opting instead to leave them in discomfort leading up to the finale.

In the early 1990s, Italian company Penta Film, under manager Phyllis Carlyle, optioned the script. Walker received the minimum fee permitted by the Writers Guild of America (WGA), which was enough for him to quit his job, move to Los Angeles, and dedicate himself to developing Seven.

=== Development ===
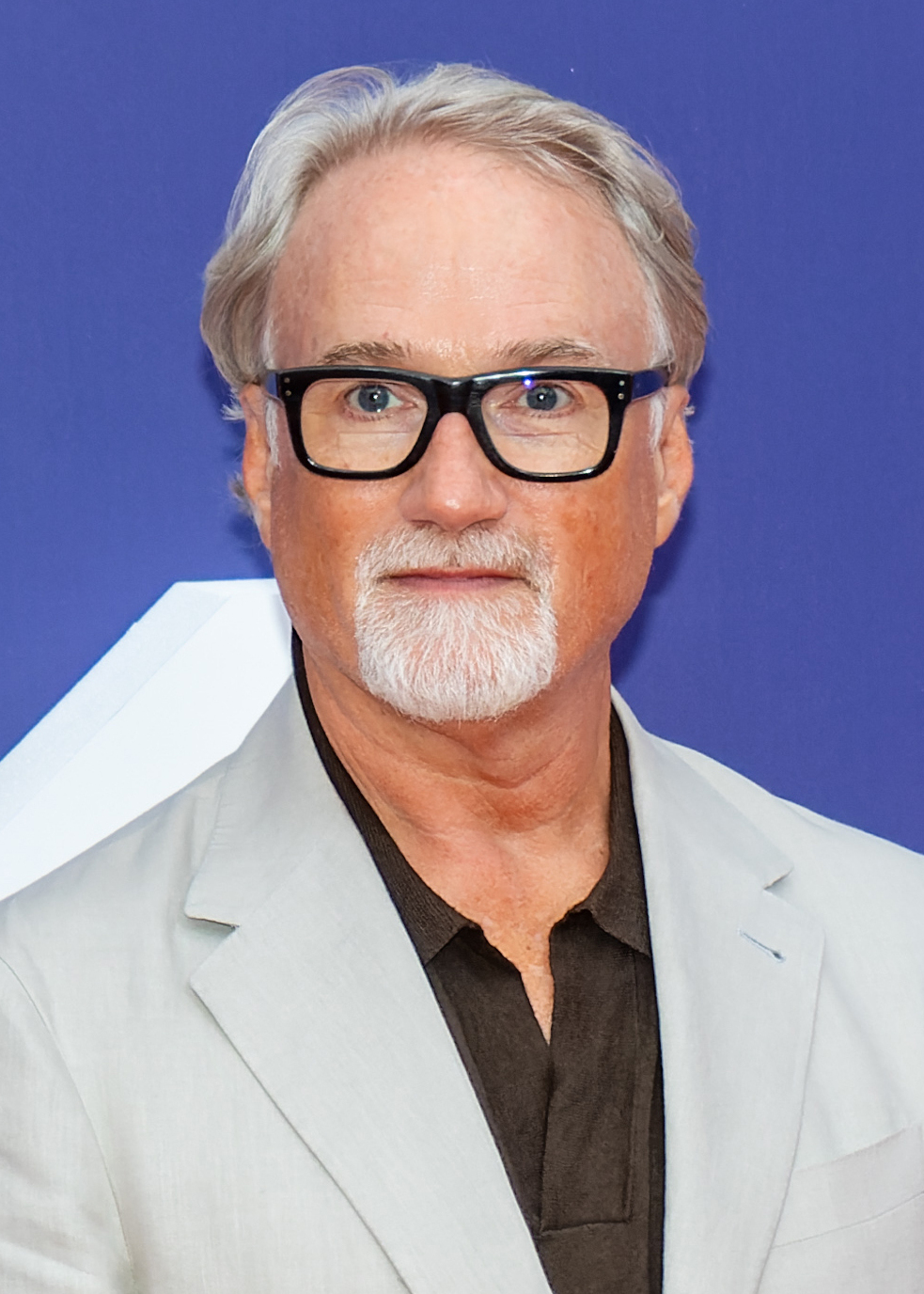
Director David Fincher (pictured in 2023)

To lead the project, Penta Film hired director Jeremiah S. Chechik, known for his recent success directing the comedy film National Lampoon's Christmas Vacation (1989) and seeking a more serious project. Chechik and Penta Film demanded several script changes, including removal of the bleak ending in which Tracy's severed head is delivered in a box. (Note: Attributed to multiple references:) Faced with the prospect of being replaced or the project being cancelled, Walker acquiesced and wrote a more conventional ending in which the detectives confront Doe in a church described as either burning or burned out. In the revised script, Doe embodies envy and kills Mills before being shot dead by Somerset, while the pregnant Tracy leaves the city. In a 2017 interview, Walker said he felt he was ruining the script and should have left the project. He ultimately wrote thirteen drafts to satisfy the studio's demands.

As the script option neared expiration and Penta Film faced financial difficulties—culminating in the company's dissolution in 1994—the rights were sold to producer Arnold Kopelson, who subsequently brought the project to New Line Cinema. (Note: Attributed to multiple references:) Chechik left the project, and Guillermo del Toro and Phil Joanou were approached as possible replacements; Joanou declined because he considered the story too bleak.

David Fincher had established himself directing music videos, including "Vogue" by Madonna and "Who Is It" by Michael Jackson. His feature-film debut, Alien 3 (1992), was a negative experience, as he clashed with 20th Century Fox over mandated edits that altered his vision for the film. Fincher subsequently disowned it, saying, "I'd rather die of colon cancer than make another movie." Despite this, Fincher's agent sent him the Seven script. Initially uninterested in its police-procedural elements, Fincher became captivated by the gradual revelation of Doe's plan, saying, "I found myself getting more and more trapped in this kind of evil ... and even though I felt uncomfortable about being there, I had to keep going." Fincher believed the script aligned with his creative sensibilities, particularly its exploration of evil and uncompromising ending, in which the protagonists do not engage in a last-minute action sequence to save Tracy because she is already dead. (Note: Attributed to multiple references:) Fincher expressed his interest to the studio, which then realized he had mistakenly been sent Walker's original script. New Line Cinema provided him with the current draft, in which Tracy survives, but Fincher insisted on directing the original version. During discussions with Michael De Luca, New Line Cinema's president of production, the pair discovered that they shared a preference for Walker's original script. They agreed to begin filming that version within six weeks, fearing that further delay might attract executive attention and interference with their plans. (Note: Attributed to multiple references:)

Kopelson and studio executives continued trying to soften Seven's tone and alter its ending. (Note: Attributed to multiple references:) Fincher resisted the proposed changes and was unwilling to compromise his creative control or vision. De Luca remained supportive, and the original ending gained further backing as prominent actors, including Morgan Freeman, Brad Pitt, and Kevin Spacey, joined the project. Pitt agreed to star only if the head-in-the-box ending was retained, having been frustrated that the original ending of his previous film, Legends of the Fall (1994), was changed after negative test-audience reactions. He also insisted that Mills kill Doe, believing it was important that Mills act out of passion rather than morality. Kopelson ultimately supported Fincher after being assured that Tracy's severed head would not be shown. Walker maintained that softening the ending would undermine the story's core.

Walker further refined the script, including expanding a chase sequence in which Mills cautiously pursues Doe. He wanted to avoid conventional cinematic chases in which characters recklessly pursue their target, reasoning that he would be wary of turning every corner in the same situation. A shooting script was completed by August 1994.

=== Casting ===
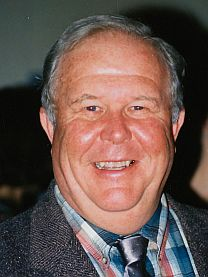
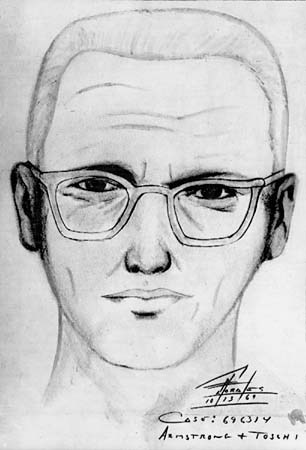
Ned Beatty (pictured in 1996) was offered the role of John Doe based on the 1969 composite sketch of the Zodiac Killer, with Fincher saying, "He should look like a poster."

Pitt had established himself as an in-demand star following the success of Interview with the Vampire (1994) and Legends of the Fall, but Fincher had not initially considered him for Mills because he did not fit his conception of the character. After meeting Pitt, however, Fincher believed he was charismatic and likeable enough to keep the audience sympathetic to Mills regardless of his actions. To secure Pitt's involvement, Kopelson shortened pre-production from twelve weeks to five to accommodate his schedule. Pitt rejected several other film offers because he wanted to escape typecasting as a romantic lead in favour of something with a more "documentary feel", an urban setting, and a focus on dialogue, akin to thrillers such as The Conversation (1974). Pitt described Mills as a well-intentioned "idiot" who "speaks before he really knows what he's talking about". He cut his hair for the role and lost weight to reduce the muscle he had developed for Legends of the Fall. Sylvester Stallone and Denzel Washington declined the role.

Walker named Somerset after writer W. Somerset Maugham. He envisioned William Hurt in the role, but Fincher cast Freeman at Kopelson's suggestion, despite studio concerns that pairing a black detective with a white one would make Seven seem derivative of Lethal Weapon (1987). Robert Duvall, Gene Hackman, and Al Pacino declined the role. The script was further revised after Pitt and Freeman were cast to better match their acting styles; Mills became more verbose, while Somerset's dialogue was reduced and made more precise and direct. Robin Wright auditioned for Tracy, while Christina Applegate declined the role before Paltrow was cast. Pitt recommended Paltrow after being impressed by her audition for Legends of the Fall. Fincher preferred Paltrow, but initial discussions suggested that she would not be interested in a film as dark as Seven. After auditioning about 100 actors, Fincher had Pitt contact Paltrow and arrange a meeting. Fincher considered Tracy important because she provides the film's only tonally positive elements, and believed Paltrow's previous performances showed she could convey that effectively despite the character's limited screen time.

Fincher and Walker wanted Ned Beatty to play John Doe, inspired by the appearance of the 1969 composite sketch of the Zodiac Killer and seeking someone who could "look like a poster"; Beatty declined, calling the script the "most evil thing I've ever read". Michael Stipe, lead vocalist of R.E.M., was considered, but filming conflicted with the band's tour. Christopher Guest was also considered, while Val Kilmer declined the role. R. Lee Ermey auditioned, but Fincher found his portrayal unsympathetic and lacking depth. (Note: Attributed to multiple references:) Kevin Spacey was preferred by Pitt, but executives initially refused to meet his asking price. Doe's scenes were first filmed with an unknown actor, but the filmmakers quickly decided to replace him, and Pitt helped negotiate Spacey's involvement. Spacey received a call on a Friday night asking him to join the production and was filming by the following Tuesday; he completed his scenes in twelve days. Spacey requested that his name be omitted from the film's marketing and opening credits to preserve the secrecy surrounding the killer's identity. (Note: Attributed to multiple references:) He said:

"I'd just done Swimming with Sharks (1994), The Usual Suspects, and Outbreak (both 1995) ... I knew that if any of those movies did well, my profile would be ... different ... If I'm the third-billed actor in a movie where the top two billings are trying to find somebody and they don't find that somebody until the last reel, then it's obvious who that somebody is ... I felt very strongly that it was the right thing to do for the movie. We finally won because it was a deal-breaker; I was either going to be on a plane to shoot the movie, or I wasn't".

The 480 lb (220 kg) Bob Mack made his film debut as the gluttony victim. Gene Borkan was cast as the greed victim because the filmmakers wanted someone resembling lawyer Robert Shapiro. He did not realize the character would already be dead and refused a request to appear nude. After learning what the scene involved, Borkan renegotiated his pay to "five times [the $522 Screen Actors Guild (SAG) day-scale fee]". Michael Reid MacKay's audition for the sloth victim required him to portray a corpse slowly turning his head towards the camera. His performance was deemed sufficiently "creepy". Set decorator Cat Mueller portrayed the lust victim after Fincher's assistant told her she had the personality and body to play a dead prostitute. She received $500 for two days' work and described being nude in front of Pitt as a perk. Model Heidi Schanz was cast as the pride victim after the previous actor dropped out. With little time remaining, Fincher wanted a model who already had headshots that could be displayed throughout the character's apartment. The film's content made casting and crewing Seven difficult. Gary Oldman declined an unspecified role, Fincher's former costume designer refused to work on the film, and one talent agent declined to pass offers to their clients, describing Seven as "evil and misogynistic".

=== Filming ===
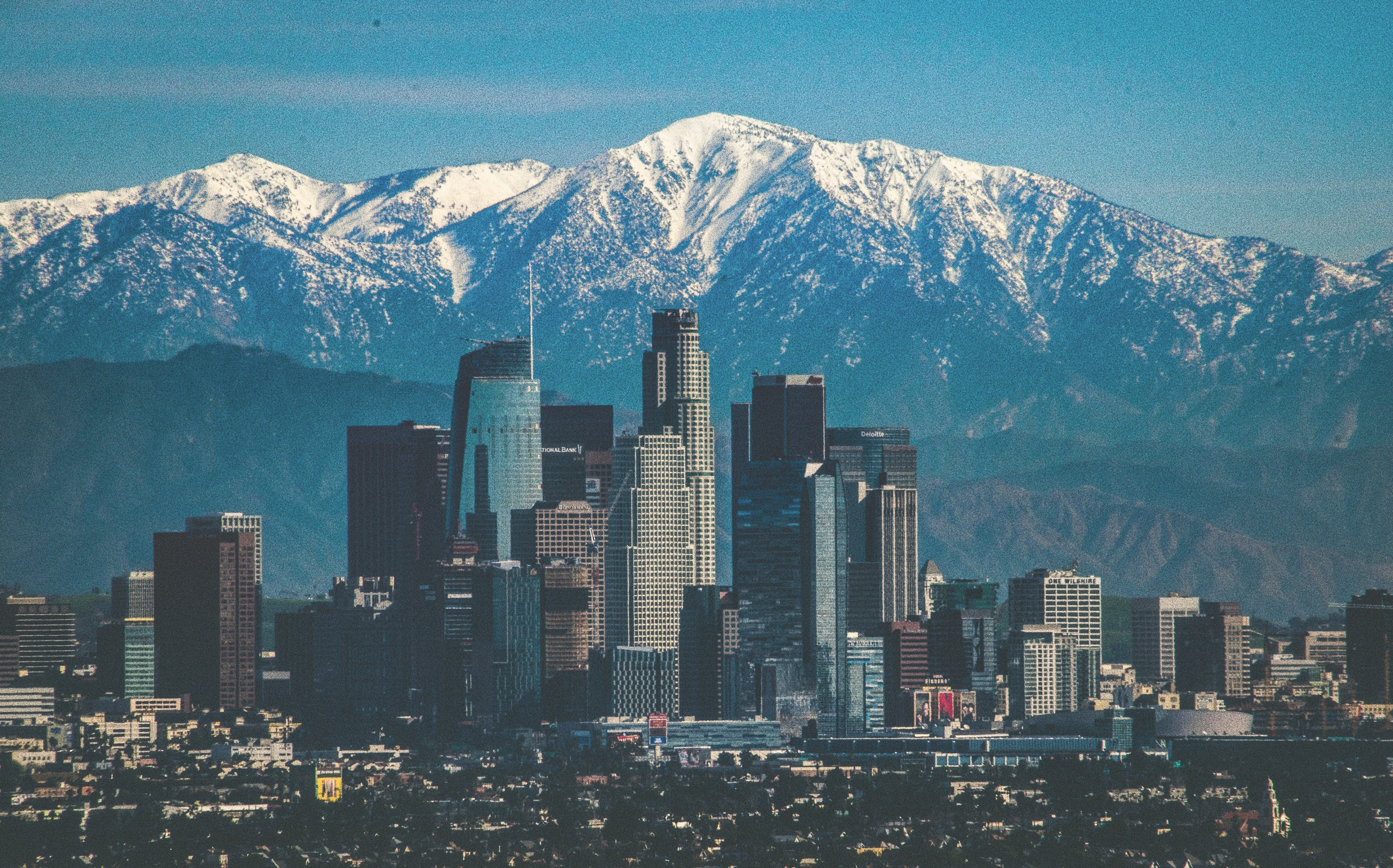
Seven was filmed mainly in downtown Los Angeles (pictured in 2016).

Principal photography began on December 12, 1994, and concluded on March 10, 1995. Walker remained on set throughout filming to offer suggestions and provide rewrites as needed, but largely deferred to Fincher, believing he should adapt the script as he saw fit. Michael Alan Kahn served as assistant director.

Location filming took place entirely in downtown Los Angeles. Fincher had wanted to shoot in Oakland, California, attracted by its clapboard houses, but the schedule did not allow it. Rain frequently disrupted filming, so Fincher chose to incorporate it rather than risk continuity problems, particularly because Pitt was available for only fifty-five days before beginning work on 12 Monkeys (1995). Fincher also felt the rain reinforced the characters' sense of entrapment by making conditions oppressive both indoors and outdoors, while helping the city feel less recognizably like sunny Los Angeles.

Seven's visual style drew influence from films including All That Jazz (1979), The Silence of the Lambs (1991), and The French Connection (1971), as well as the over-the-shoulder perspective used in the documentary television series Cops, which Fincher felt conveyed vulnerability. Cinematographer Darius Khondji cited the crime thriller Klute (1971) as a significant influence, particularly its "use of toplight ... widescreen compositions for intimacy rather than big vistas, the way that vertical strips of the city are shown in horizontal mode, the fragments of faces and bodies ... the look of Se7en has this heightened sense of realism—a realism that's been kicked up several notches and becomes its own style". Fincher singled out a scene in Klute lit only by a character's flashlight, saying he disliked films in which characters complained of poor visibility while the audience could still see clearly. Khondji contrasted warm light from Chinese lanterns, representing the past and present, with the colder light of Kino Flos, representing the future.

The studio objected to the darkness of the dailies, and Khondji suggested printing the footage brighter, but Fincher refused. A promotional showreel assembled from the available footage was well received at the theater-owner convention ShoWest, after which complaints about the darkness ceased. Khondji used Panavision Primo lenses for their sharpness and contrast, together with Kodak film stocks capable of capturing the film's "gritty" interiors and deep blacks in night exteriors.

Khondji described the sequence in which Mills pursues Doe as one of the most difficult to shoot because of its length, rapid camera movement, rain, and cramped, dimly lit interiors. One segment had to be reshot because the location was too dark for the camera to capture Freeman's face. Pitt insisted on performing his own stunts for the scene and slipped on a rain-slicked car hood, crashing through the windshield and cutting tendons and nerves in his left hand; Fincher said exposed bone was visible. Pitt returned to filming a few days later with stitches and a forearm cast, which was written into later scenes. In scenes set before the chase, he kept the injured hand in his pocket or otherwise concealed it. (Note: Attributed to multiple references:)

For the sloth-victim sequence, the crew had to clear used condoms and crack pipes from the location and replace them with prop crack pipes and air fresheners. Although the reveal that the victim was still alive was written into the script, and later accounts stated that Freeman, Pitt, and McGinley were aware of it, MacKay recalled that Fincher told the SWAT performers only that there would be "a corpse", leading them to expect a prop. MacKay maintained that McGinley's startled reaction to his movement was genuine on the first take, although McGinley himself recalled "acting shocked" for the scene. Green color gels were used on lights shining through the windows from an adjacent building to give the scene a green tint.

The ending was scripted to take place directly beneath transmission towers, which Doe selects to disrupt police communications. The towers also interfered with the film crew's radios, forcing the actors to use cell phones to communicate with the crew from a distance.

=== Ending and post-production ===
The film's ending remained a point of contention between New Line Cinema and the filmmakers. Fincher, intending to shock audiences, wanted Mills's shooting of Doe to be followed by an abrupt cut to black, but executives believed this would alienate viewers. (Note: Attributed to multiple references:) Fincher instructed staff at a test screening to leave the lights off after the cut so audiences could absorb the ending, but his instructions were ignored. Afterwards, Fincher recalled a passing woman remarking, "The people who made that movie should be killed". Fincher said the screening invitation only told audiences that the film would feature Pitt and Freeman, both then associated with films very different in tone from Seven.

Executives wanted a mainstream conclusion in which Mills and Somerset pursue Doe and a kidnapped Tracy, who survives. According to Pitt, the studio also suggested a more heroic outcome for Mills in which he does not kill Doe and the box contains the head of one of Mills's dogs rather than Tracy's. Freeman preferred a storyboarded version in which Somerset kills Doe, sparing Mills from also losing his career, but Pitt insisted that Mills had to kill Doe, and test audiences preferred that version. Another proposed ending had Mills shoot Somerset to prevent him from killing Doe first. Fincher and Pitt refused to abandon the head-in-the-box ending, but agreed to a longer epilogue showing Mills's arrest and Somerset delivering a concluding narration intended to provide some humanity. (Note: Attributed to multiple references:) Fincher recalled that Freeman performed the box-opening scene about 17 times. Although rumored to contain a prosthetic replica of Paltrow's head, the box instead held a weighted bag filled with metal pellets and fitted with a blood-stained wig.

Pitt and Fincher were dissatisfied with the car-ride sequence leading into the finale because excessive ambient noise picked up during filming required the dialogue to be overdubbed, which Pitt believed diminished the scene's momentum, pacing, and emotion. The helicopter footage was also filmed during post-production because there had been insufficient time during principal photography; the studio had agreed to provide additional time and funding if further material proved necessary. By then, the previously green landscape had turned brown, requiring the ground-based footage to be color-corrected to match. The opening credits were originally scripted to accompany footage of Somerset visiting a countryside home he intended to buy for retirement, taking a piece of wallpaper with him before returning to the city by train. The sequence was intended to contrast the countryside with the darkness of the city, but there was insufficient budget to film it, and later scenes showing Somerset with the wallpaper were removed.

Richard Francis-Bruce edited the 127-minute theatrical cut. His approach emphasized "having a motivated cut", with each edit serving a specific purpose. For the finale, he used increasingly rapid cuts as Doe's plan is revealed, along with a four-frame image of Tracy as Mills pulls the trigger to compensate for never showing the contents of the box. To deepen the film's visual darkness, Fincher and Khondji used an expensive and time-consuming bleach bypass process that retained some of the silver normally removed from the film stock, producing a luminous effect in light tones and deeper, darker colors. Of the 2,500 prints distributed to theaters, only a few hundred underwent the process.

Seven was initially budgeted at $30–31 million, but Fincher repeatedly persuaded studio executives to provide additional funding, ultimately pushing the cost about $3 million higher, to $33–34 million. (Note: The 1995 budget of $33–$34 million is equivalent to $69.7 million–$71.8 million in 2025.) This made it New Line Cinema's most expensive film to that point. (Note: Attributed to multiple references:) One studio employee recalled that executives would enter meetings determined not to grant Fincher any more money, only to be persuaded by his persistence.

=== Music and sound ===
Fincher hired Howard Shore to score Seven based on his work on The Silence of the Lambs. Shore said Fincher attended recording sessions but rarely interfered with his process. Performed by an orchestra of up to 100 musicians, the score combines brass, including trumpets, with percussion and piano. "Portrait of John Doe" serves as the central theme and is built around two cue notes; a rising variation accompanies Tracy's appearances. Shore said the ending had a visceral effect on him, which he reflected in the score by using little accompaniment during the dialogue between Mills, Somerset, and Doe, while emphasizing key moments such as Somerset opening the box.

Shore's more upbeat original opening theme, "The Last Seven Days", was replaced by Nine Inch Nails's "Closer", remixed by Coil and Danny Hyde. David Bowie's "The Hearts Filthy Lesson" plays over the end credits. Other music featured in Seven includes "In the Beginning" by the Statler Brothers, "Guilty" by Gravity Kills, "Trouble Man" by Marvin Gaye, "Speaking of Happiness" by Gloria Lynne, Johann Sebastian Bach's Air from Suite No. 3 in D Major, BWV 1068, performed by the Stuttgarter Kammerorchester, "Love Plus One" by Haircut One Hundred, "I Cover the Waterfront" by Billie Holiday, "Now's the Time" by Charlie Parker, and "Straight, No Chaser" by Thelonious Monk.

Sound engineer Ren Klyce and Fincher incorporated frequent diegetic background sounds, including rain and screaming, to suggest that disturbing events were occurring off-screen and to create a sense that the audience could not escape them. Klyce and sound designer Steve Boedekker also created the music heard at the entrance to the sex club where the lust victim is murdered.

== Design ==
=== Style and set design ===
Production designer Arthur Max, costume designer Michael Kaplan, Fincher, and Khondji collaborated to establish a unified visual approach. Their guiding principle was that the film's world should appear corrupted, dysfunctional, and in a state of decay. Fincher drew inspiration from the photography of William Eggleston and Robert Frank, whose work emphasized "coolness", creating visuals that were simultaneously gritty, stylized, classic, and contemporary. Khondji said Frank's influence was particularly evident in Seven's bright exteriors and dark interiors, a contrast achieved by underexposing the film negative. The final scene with Mills, Somerset, and Doe used inconsistent lighting, with the actors backlit by the sun regardless of their position within the scene.

Fincher wanted precise staging to make audiences feel physically present in each location. Believing creative limitations would challenge him, he had sets constructed without removable walls, forcing the crew to film within their confines. Doe's murder scenes were influenced by photography, including the work of Joel-Peter Witkin, while the sloth sequence drew particularly on Edvard Munch, using green tones and "claustrophobic" imagery.

=== Victims ===
Rob Bottin led development of the film's practical effects. He researched crime-scene photographs and police evidence files, observed an autopsy, and studied the effects of obesity to inform his designs. For the gluttony victim, Mack spent up to 10 hours a day having makeup and prosthetics applied. He was unaware that the scene involved insects until reading the daily call sheet and noticing a "cockroach wrangler". A fiberglass replica of Mack was used for the character's autopsy.

Bottin's team spent 11 days developing the appearance and prosthetics for the sloth victim. MacKay was 5 ft 5 in (165 cm) tall and weighed 96 to 98 lb (about 44 kg) during filming, giving him a naturally slight frame for the emaciated character. The filmmakers asked him to lose more weight, but he refused. The effects team cast MacKay's body, head, arms, and feet to create molds for his full-body makeup. His appearance incorporated airbrushed veins, additional body painting, gelatin sores, skeletal teeth, and hair plastered to his head. Applying the makeup and prosthetics to his face and body took 14 hours, requiring MacKay to begin at 5 am for an 8 pm call time. During four hours of filming, MacKay had to remain almost completely still and limit his breathing so his stomach would not visibly rise and fall. The cold conditions were worsened by makeup artists repeatedly spraying his body with water; unable to move, he tensed his muscles to keep warm. He described the relief of finally being allowed to cough in McGinley's face, as he could move and breathe normally again. For Schanz's pride victim, her nose was taped to one side and her face wrapped in gauze.

=== Title credits ===
Following the removal of the planned opening train sequence featuring Somerset, Fincher needed a temporary title sequence for studio screenings of Seven. (Note: Attributed to multiple references:) He recruited R/GA designer Kyle Cooper and his team to create a montage from Doe's perspective, establishing the character and the threat he posed before his appearance in the final act. At Fincher's request, the sequence was set to the "Closer" remix.

The sequence was well received by executives, who suggested retaining it for the theatrical release. Fincher, reluctant to appear to be accepting their suggestion, initially asked Cooper to devise a new concept, but Cooper persuaded him to develop a more elaborate version of the montage instead. Cooper focused on Doe's journals, which are briefly glimpsed in the film, while Fincher wanted the sequence to depict Doe himself. Fincher initially wanted Mark Romanek to direct the sequence, admiring his music video for "Closer" and sharing similar design sensibilities, but Cooper secured the role because of his previous experience with title design. Fincher told Cooper, "All I want is for the audience to want to run screaming from the theater during the title section".

The sequence depicts Doe preparing for his murders, including cutting off his fingertips, developing photographs in his bathtub, and making tea. The latter detail was inspired by Cooper's appreciation for the "elegant" way Doe stirs his tea after surrendering. The sequence also focuses on Doe writing in his journals and crossing out words such as "pregnancy" and "marriage", along with other symbols of a "perfect life" he believes people do not deserve. Fincher described it as "a way of introducing the evil", saying the sequence presents the audience with images from the mind of someone who has "lost it", whose meaning becomes clearer later. Clive Piercy and John Sabel created Doe's journals, which cost tens of thousands of dollars each to fill with text and images. Around six complete journals were produced. Artist Wayne Coe storyboarded the sequence, which was filmed by Harris Savides and edited by Angus Wall. Cooper regularly discussed ideas with Wall and spent the night before filming gathering objects such as fish hooks and loose hairs from his drain that he thought would make visually interesting additions.

Filming took place over eight days, including two days with a hand model standing in for Doe. Fincher was dissatisfied with the casting because the model's hands were shorter and thicker than Spacey's. A further five weeks were spent assembling the sequence. Although digital techniques were available, Cooper's team constructed it by hand, believing irregularities and accidents would enhance the aesthetic. They manually added scratches, tears, and pen marks to the film negative. Fincher and Cooper also devised rough credit lettering intended to resemble writing by a "disturbed hand". The text was scratched onto a black-surfaced scratchboard and manipulated during transfer to film to create smears and overlapping variations, producing an animation-like effect. Low-frequency "disquieting" sounds, including barking dogs and screams, were layered throughout. The title sequence cost $50,000.

== Release ==
=== Marketing ===
New Line Cinema had low expectations for Seven based on middling test-audience scores. The studio's marketing president, Chris Pula, described the advertising campaign as risky because it had to prepare audiences for the film's dark, violent content while generating discussion among potential viewers. Early trailers and newspaper, television, and radio advertisements emphasized the seven deadly sins, positioning Seven as an "edgy" prestige film rather than a jumpscare-style horror. Entertainment professionals believed violent or horrific films had limited appeal and rarely received positive reviews. Fincher's reputation had also been tarnished by the failure of Alien 3, and although Freeman and Pitt were proven box-office draws, New Line Cinema struggled to capitalize on Pitt's popularity. His core audience of teenage girls was not considered the film's target demographic, while research suggested young men were reluctant to take romantic partners to Pitt films because they felt "threatened" by his appeal. Strong word-of-mouth after Seven's release prompted the campaign to shift toward Pitt's female fans.

Seven premiered on September 19, 1995, at the Academy of Motion Picture Arts and Sciences in Beverly Hills, California. More than 800 guests attended, including Fincher, Freeman, McGinley, Spacey, Tia Carrere, Matthew Modine, Robert Rodriguez, Steven Seagal, John Singleton, Quentin Tarantino, and Jennifer Tilly.

=== Box office ===
Seven was released in the United States and Canada on September 22, 1995. In its opening weekend, the film grossed $14 million from 2,441 theaters, averaging $5,714 per theater and ranking first at the box office, ahead of the debut of Showgirls ($8.1 million) and To Wong Foo, Thanks for Everything! Julie Newmar ($4.5 million) in its third week of release. It achieved the highest-grossing September opening weekend at the time, surpassing Freddy's Dead: The Final Nightmare (1991), which had opened with $12.6 million. The strong opening was attributed to Pitt's popularity, limited competition from other action films, and a marketing campaign that overcame audience skepticism about the premise. Audiences surveyed by CinemaScore gave the film an average grade of "B" on a scale of A+ to F. New Line Cinema distribution executive Mitch Goldman had moved the release date forward to avoid competition and opened the film in more theaters than usual, targeting suburban and small-town markets where Pitt's recent films had performed well.

Seven remained number one in its second weekend with a gross of $12.4 million, ahead of the debuts of Halloween: The Curse of Michael Myers ($7.3 million) and Devil in a Blue Dress ($5.4 million), and again in its third weekend, grossing $10.4 million, ahead of Assassins ($9.4 million) and Dead Presidents ($8 million). It remained the highest-grossing film until its fifth weekend, when it fell to number 3 behind the debuts of Get Shorty ($12.7 million) and Now and Then ($7.4 million), and stayed among the ten-highest-grossing films for nine weeks. (Note: Attributed to multiple references:) By the end of December, Seven had grossed about $87 million and was re-released in select locations to raise its profile during the nomination period for the 1996 Academy Awards. The re-release raised its total to about $100.1 million, making it the ninth-highest-grossing film of 1995, ahead of Die Hard with a Vengeance ($100 million) and behind Casper ($100.3 million). Industry estimates from 1997 placed the studio's rental returns, after theaters' share, at $43.1 million.

Seven also performed strongly outside the U.S. and Canada, with successful openings in Australia ($1.8 million), South Korea ($808,009), Seoul ($961,538), New Zealand, and the Netherlands. The film earned a further $227.2 million from these markets.

Worldwide, Seven grossed $327.3 million, (Note: The 1995 theatrical box office gross of $327.3 million is equivalent to $692 million in 2025.) making it the seventh-highest-grossing film of the year. It was an unexpected commercial success and one of the most profitable films of 1995. Literary critic John Kenneth Muir noted that many horror films released that year had underperformed despite being associated with prominent genre directors such as Wes Craven and John Carpenter. He attributed Seven's breakout success to its blending of horror, police procedural, and urban noir, as well as its tendency to suggest rather than explicitly depict much of the violence, leaving it to the audience's imagination.

Seven was re-released theatrically in 2025, earning an additional $2.6 million worldwide and raising its lifetime gross to $329.8 million.

== Reception ==
=== Critical response ===
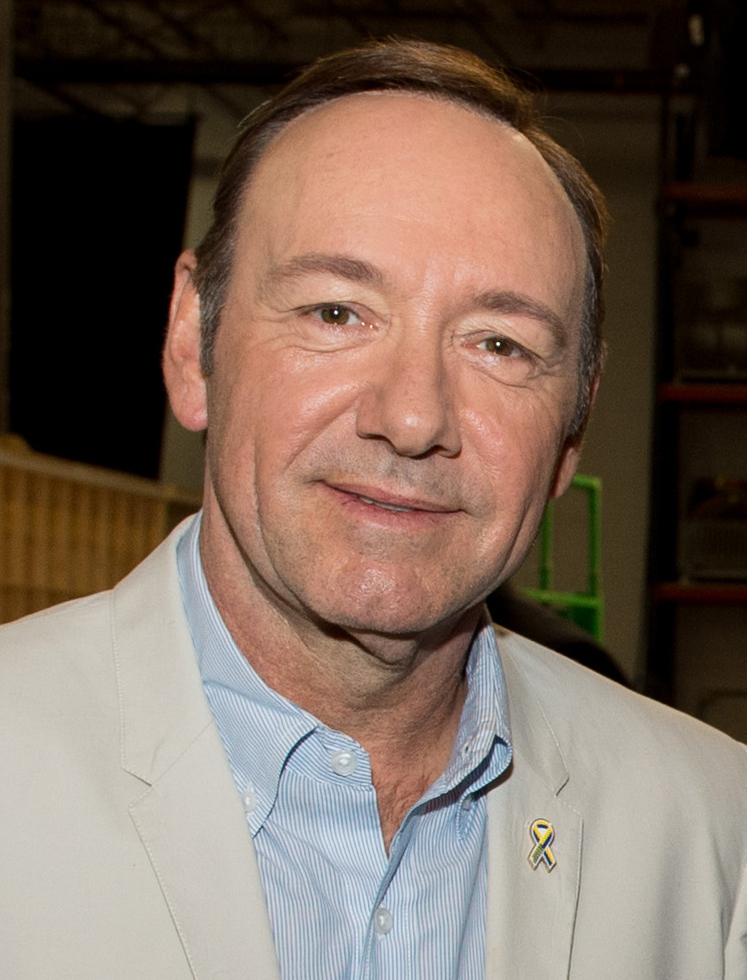
Kevin Spacey (pictured in 2013) was a late addition to Seven as the studio originally did not want to pay his fee. Critics praised his portrayal of Doe.

Seven received generally positive reviews. Critics including Roger Ebert, Desson Howe, and James Berardinelli described Seven as an intelligent, well-made thriller capable of comfortably standing alongside other thrillers. Others compared Seven unfavorably with The Silence of the Lambs and The Usual Suspects, saying Seven lacks the other films' intelligent narrative, and takes itself too seriously as an examination of evil instead of a "silly piece of pulp". The Orlando Sentinel said, however, Seven offers a "terrific film-noir atmosphere" and excellent performances, with The Seattle Times saying the film would be "unendurable" without Freeman and Spacey.

James Berardinelli and Janet Maslin, among others, praised Freeman's performance. Terrence Rafferty and Kenneth Turan wrote that Freeman's "exceptional" performance is mainly responsible for making Seven watchable despite itself. Critics said Freeman frequently stole scenes from Pitt and brought depth to an otherwise clichéd role, with Howe remarking that he even made Pitt "look actorly" alongside him. Reviews of Pitt's performance were polarized between those who found it "energetic" and impressive and those who believed the role was beyond his acting abilities. Some reviewers said Pitt's performance continued his successful transition to more-serious roles from those based mainly on his appearance, although Howe said Pitt's presence does more for Seven than his acting. The Orlando Sentinel said what could have been a cliché role was saved by Mills not being inept or inexperienced, just out of his depth in this case. Jami Bernard, Turan, and Berardinelli criticized Mills as stereotypical, unlikeable, or poorly developed, and found Pitt's performance insufficient to overcome the character's shortcomings.

Several critics positively received Paltrow's performance, saying she made the most of her limited screen time and was generally underused while considering the character a "flimsy contrivance". Spacey's performance was also praised for its creepy, understated portrayal of an intelligent character who does not undermine himself with "a moment of sheer stupidity".

Fincher's directorial style was commended for its "striking craftsmanship" and "stunning" visuals that often simultaneously thrill and exasperate the viewer. In contrast, Rafferty said Fincher's style became less effective when stretched over the film's runtime, while other critics accused him of mistaking darkness for profundity and choosing style over coherence. Although Gene Siskel considered Walker's script to be smartly written, several critics were less enthusiastic, finding the dialogue trite, many scenes implausible, and character motivations weak. Bernard and Richard Schickel wrote Seven lacks many of the essentials prevalent in its genre such as suspense, witty dialogue and cathartic humor, and the psychological depth to match the intellectual thrills of The Silence of the Lambs.

The violent content of Seven was generally negatively received. Critics such as Berardinelli and Siskel found the gore excessive, and Hartl called it "gratuitous". While some found the violent visuals to be tiresome and detracting, others said Fincher skilfully avoided showing the violence that led to the deaths, preventing them from distracting from Seven's more enjoyable aspects. According to Ebert and Turan, however, Seven would be too disturbing for many viewers. Fincher responded: "I didn't set out to piss off the people who are upset. I was told that Michael Medved [film critic at the New York Post] wrote that the movie was evil, but I'm sure he slows down when he passes an accident just like everyone else. Death fascinates people, but they don't deal with it". Howe said the ending is "like an act of treachery against the viewer", undermining any hope for a positive outcome, and Barry Norman said it denies the audience "even of the final comfort they fully deserve". Owen Gleiberman praised its grim irony. Ebert found the ending "satisfying" but underwhelming compared to the film's earlier events.

=== Accolades ===
Seven received one nomination at the 68th Academy Awards for Best Film Editing (Richard Francis-Bruce), and Walker was nominated for Best Original Screenplay at the 49th British Academy Film Awards. At the MTV Movie Awards, Seven received three awards; Best Movie, Most Desirable Male (Pitt), and Best Villain (Spacey). New Line Cinema re-released Seven in Westwood, Los Angeles, California, on December 26 and in New York City on December 29, 1995, in an unsuccessful attempt to generate Academy Award nominations for Freeman, Pitt, and Fincher.

== Post-release ==
=== Home media ===
The soundtrack to Seven was released in November 1995. The 11-track compact disc (CD) and cassette release includes several songs featured in the film, including "Guilty" and "In the Beginning", as well as two pieces from Shore's score, "Portrait of John Doe" and "Suite from Seven", but omits "Closer" and "The Hearts Filthy Lesson". A bootleg recording of the score containing additional tracks was released in 1998.

Seven was released on VHS, DVD, and LaserDisc in 1996. (Note: Attributed to multiple references:) A two-disc special edition DVD released in 2000 featured a remastered image scanned from the original film negative, along with extended and deleted scenes, the original opening featuring Somerset, the cut-to-black ending, production photographs and designs, and storyboards for an alternative ending. It also included four commentary tracks: Pitt, Fincher, and Freeman discussing the film; Fincher, De Luca, Francis-Bruce, Walker, and film studies professor Richard Dyer; Khondji, Max, Dyer, Francis-Bruce, and Fincher; and an isolated music-and-effects track with commentary by Shore, Klyce, Dyer, and Fincher.

The film was released on Blu-ray Disc in 2010 with remastered visuals and the special edition's bonus material; a collectible DigiBook edition additionally included production notes and photographs. The complete 16-track score was officially released on CD in 2016.

In 2023, Fincher announced that he was developing a 4K resolution remaster of Seven from the original film negative. He said he would not alter the film's content, but intended to enhance some visual elements and conceal flaws made more apparent by the higher resolution. The remaster received a one-week theatrical release exclusively in IMAX theaters beginning January 3, 2025, followed by a 4K Ultra HD Blu-Ray release on January 7 for the film's 30th anniversary.

=== Other media ===
A novelization of Seven, written by Anthony Bruno, was released alongside the film in November 1995. A seven-issue comic-book series was published by Zenescope Entertainment between September 2006 and October 2007. Serving as a prequel to the film, it focuses on Doe and the planning of his crimes.

== Thematic analysis ==
=== Apathy and hope ===
The apathy of the film's unnamed city's inhabitants is a central theme in Seven. Somerset does not believe the city can be saved, intending to retire beyond its confines, and tells Mills that women are taught to yell "fire" rather than "help" because people are more likely to pay attention if they selfishly think of themselves as in danger. Film scholar Amy Taubin described the city as an infection point for corruption, in which signs of violence and decay are omnipresent in its dark corners, rain, television reports, fights, screams, and children in impoverished apartments. Richard Dyer draws parallels between the perpetual rain in Seven and films like Blade Runner (1982), emphasizing its relentless and pervasive nature. In Seven, the incessant rain symbolizes sin permeating every conceivable crevice. The city's bleak aesthetic implies a moral decay and indifference by its inhabitants that enables Doe's plan, which can be considered akin to the sloth sin. (Note: Attributed to multiple references:)

The city reflects a common trend in Hollywood cinema during the 1980s and 1990s, portraying iconic American urban settings like New York City as nightmarish realms of criminality and moral chaos, as seen in films such as Escape from New York (1981), Batman (1989), Darkman (1990), and The Crow (1994). Macek said such films articulate a pronounced anti-urbanism, surpassing the mere recycling of cultural imagery. Despite their lack of realism, these movies tap into the fantastical realm of horror and entertainment, allowing them to express repressed fears and anxieties within viewers' everyday lives. Seven's city is presented as a blighted, decaying zone of unfettered criminality and vice, echoing a reactionary view of urban problems concerning segments of the contemporary American middle class. According to Macek, Seven validates suburban fears of inner-city communities and the urban poor as unruly and beyond redemption. Professor Kirsten Thompson characterizes the city as devoid of temporal or spatial markers, with an absence of recognizable elements like street signs, costumes, or specific vehicles that could provide clues to its identity. This intentional lack of distinct features creates an unsettling impression that the city exists in a perpetual state of ambiguity, simultaneously everywhere and nowhere. The narrative thus reinforces the notion that the city is trapped in a temporal loop, condemned to endlessly repeat cycles of sin and corruption without the prospect of liberation or escape.

Somerset has not stopped caring but has become resigned to the apathy of those around him and the futility of his efforts. Seven underscores this in several scenes, such as the dismissal of his concerns regarding a child witnessing a murder, the police captain's indifference to a mugger stabbing his victim's eyes, and the sex club manager who dislikes his role but sees no alternative. Critic Matt Goldberg describes Mills and Tracy as naïve to the city's corruption; for example, they are tricked into renting an apartment that experiences constant shaking from nearby trains. Thompson observes that Tracy, unlike Mills, possesses a more discerning perspective, having already concluded that the city holds no promising future for her family and expresses her desire to return to their home outside its borders. Somerset supports her, hoping to spare Tracy and her unborn child from the influences of the city.

Both Somerset and Doe perceive the ubiquity of sin and indifference toward it. There are parallels between the characters, both of whom live alone, are devoted to their work, and have no meaningful relationships. Although there is mention of some acquaintances, Somerset tells Tracy that those who spend time with him find him disagreeable. Somerset and Doe differ in their response to sin; Somerset has surrendered to apathy and despair, whereas Doe feels contempt for society and has assumed the role of its punisher. It is implied that Somerset was passionate about his work until he realized the futility of effecting change, while Doe remains dedicated and fervent, believing in the transformative impact of his actions. Somerset, who has never taken a life, retains a glimmer of hope for humanity's redemption, while Doe, in contrast, freely commits murder, convinced of humanity's irredeemable nature. When confronted by Mills about the innocence of his victims, Doe retorts that sin pervades the city to such an extent that innocence becomes trivial and tolerated.

Walker described Mills as the optimist and Somerset as the pessimist. The ending proves Mills's optimism was misplaced, but given the option to walk away from the problem as intended or stay, Somerset remains. Doe's plan works, shocking Somerset out of his apathy, and inspiring him to defer his retirement and fight for a better future. Rosenbaum described it as an enduring belief in the ability of goodness to prevail once again, tempered by the fact that the hope is inspired by a self-martyred serial killer. He said Seven chose style over substance, giving the overall message that nothing will really change.

Writers Deborah Wills and Andrew Wilson concluded that despite the seemingly hopeless worlds depicted, Seven challenges viewers to confront their complicity in everyday events and act differently, and reconsider their outlook and approach to a world they deem worthy of redemption. Released during a period of heightened anxiety leading up to the Millennium, Seven tapped into prevalent fears and marked the two-thousandth anniversary of Jesus Christ's birth, intensifying apocalyptic speculations. In the decade surrounding this transition, many films addressed concerns about time running out, reflecting a broader sense of societal decay. Seven embodies this millennial sensibility, portraying a world devoid of hope for a better future, where individual detachment appears as the only distant prospect amid the prevailing chaos.

=== Religion and order ===
Somerset characterizes Doe's murders as his sermons to the masses. According to Dyer and author Matthew Saunders, Doe conducts a violent crusade, illustrating the consequences of moral decay and sin, based on his interpretation of Christian ideology, in a city similar to the biblical Sodom and Gomorrah. Writer Patricia Moir suggests that theorists in the late 1990s believed societal norms in North America were diminishing due to the decay of social meta-narratives of order created by religion, science, and art, and that in the absence of these paradigms, all that remains is the chaos of existence. Somerset tries to create order using the ticking of a metronome to disguise the disordered noise of sirens and screams outside his apartment. (Note: Attributed to multiple references:) Dyer wrote that Somerset's smashing of the metronome signifies his acknowledgment of the city's darkness. Doe creates order by filtering literature about the seven deadly sins and works by authors such as John Milton through a lens of religious fanaticism. He believes his purpose is God-given, which is reflected in the opening credits depicting Doe cutting the word "God" from a dollar bill.

Doe rationalizes that everyone is guilty of sin or wishing ill on other sinners, including himself, hence, his plan involves his own death. (Note: Attributed to multiple references:) Goldberg suggests that Doe is the true sin of wrath, evidenced by his violent acts. His resigned acceptance of the envy sin after assigning wrath to Mills is, according to Goldberg, because there is no other sin for him to take, and he is conscious that sin will not end with his death. Doe's transfer of wrath to Mills demonstrates the infectiousness and pervasiveness of sin. Mills's killing of Doe can be considered an act of justice, eliminating a remorseless force of evil, although his motivation is purely for revenge.

Professor Philippa Gates suggests that the greatest fear Doe represents is the possibility that he is right, as his challenging of sinners is informed by Roman Catholic doctrine. Mills is ostensibly the hero and Doe the villain, but from Doe's perspective, his victims were not innocent, drawing justification from biblical precedent. The idea that Doe's crimes could be defended as a means of redeeming the city creates a paradox where Mills, responsible for two deaths, is portrayed as a hero, while Doe, a murderer, is considered evil.

=== Art and literature ===
According to Professor Thomas Fahy, art, literature, music, and high culture play pivotal roles in both Doe's mission and Somerset's investigation in Seven. Doe strategically conceals a crucial clue to his plot at the greed murder scene by turning a piece of art upside down, a detail discernible only by someone versed in art, and reflecting the city's own upturned status. Somerset engages in scholarly work at the library, accompanied by Johann Sebastian Bach's "Air" as a thematic backdrop to the intellectual atmosphere of the setting. Somerset explores works such as "The Parson's Tale" by Geoffrey Chaucer and Dante Alighieri's Divine Comedy as a way of understanding Doe. However, Somerset's intellectual and philosophical inclinations isolate him, with fellow officers resenting his propensity for posing what they deem unnecessary questions. In contrast, Doe employs art for brutal purposes, crafting murder set pieces that undermine Somerset's sense of security. Mills, however, differs from both men, demonstrating a less comprehensive education and rudimentary understanding of these more cultured themes, which proves a disadvantage against the intellectual and well-read Doe. Writer Paul Gormley posited that Seven challenges racial stereotypes by affording Somerset a leading role with privileged knowledge, juxtaposing him with the naive white protagonist, Mills.

Journalist Kim Newman describes Doe's murders as art installations intended for observation, reminiscent of philosopher Michel Foucault's concept of spectacular punishment. (Note: Attributed to multiple references:) The victims are staged like models, challenging the audience to perceive the murders as repulsive and compelling, using art to express violence and highlighting the cultural divide between the educated and uneducated. Doe's portrayal as an aesthete-killer draws comparisons with characters like fictional killers such as Hannibal Lecter, yet Doe does not define himself by high culture, surrounding himself with his own art. Some, like Professor Jeremy Tambling, find allegorical links between sins and murders to be forced, questioning Doe's embodiment of envy and representing lust through the victimized prostitute.

Seven also uses color to symbolize sins. Writer Shaina Weatherhead said Seven foreshadows the importance of wrath (represented by the color red) and envy (the color green) throughout, such as Somerset's red lamp and Mills's green mug. Seven makes other references to art, such as a stack of spaghetti cans resembling Campbell's Soup Cans by Andy Warhol.

Seven includes subtle references to the number seven, reinforcing the religious subtext; Doe's plan culminates on a Sunday, the seventh day of the week and the biblical day of rest, on which Doe's package for Mills is delivered at 7:01 pm. Somerset's research references texts such as "The Parson's Tale"—which discusses penance—and a reference to seven children being slain. Of particular focus is the Divine Comedy which depicts seven terraces of purgatory, each relating to an individual sin, and the nine circles of hell. (Note: Attributed to multiple references:) Professor Steve Macek interprets the unnamed city as an allegory for the hell in the Divine Comedy. Author Valerie Allen further explores the Dantean parallels, comparing Mills to the passionate and emotional Dante who is guided through hell by the wise and rational Somerset/Virgil. While Somerset, like Virgil, is somewhat saved by Seven's denouement, Mills is denied the redemptive themes of Dante, ending the film in despair. Allen describes the moral landscape of the Divine Comedy as holding human actions accountable to reason, emphasizing justice and mercy as a cosmic principle and distinguishing between the punishment of hell and penitence in Purgatorio. While these humans can potentially purge themselves through virtuous acts, Doe's punitive approach exacerbates the city's problems rather than bringing balance.

=== Culture of celebrity ===
Moir and Professor James Oleson comment on the excesses of performance art and the culture of celebrity, with Mills disdainfully labeling Doe as a "movie of the week" and a "fucking T-shirt", implying that Doe's legacy will be short-lived, eventually fading into obscurity. While Moir proposes that the film leaves Doe's legacy open-ended, hinting at the potential for further deterioration, Oleson argues that Doe's impact in the real world cannot be ignored, asserting that discussing and studying Doe inadvertently validates his vision. Oleson explores the societal phenomenon of glorifying serial killers, citing notorious figures like Jack the Ripper, Ted Bundy, and Jeffrey Dahmer, who attained widespread recognition, as well as individuals who are sexually attracted to perpetrators of heinous crimes. The cultural fascination extends to fictional serial killers like Doe, Hannibal Lecter, Dexter Morgan, and John Kramer who are depicted as intelligent, resourceful, and endowed with unique motivations and methods.

Dyer draws a parallel between Doe and Lecter, highlighting their ability to outsmart and manipulate authorities while employing artistic methods in their murders. However, Dyer distinguishes their disparate social statuses: Lecter, an educated professional with refined tastes, contrasts with Doe, who appears self-taught, unemployed, and fixated on his mission. In contrast, Rosenbaum contends that Seven avoids glorifying Doe through comedic moments or heroic portrayals. Author Adam Nayman presents a critical view of Seven, suggesting that the film elevates Doe as a figure with valid societal critiques.

=== Characters ===
Writers Terri Murray and Lewis Rose highlight a thematic parallel between Somerset and Doe, emphasizing their meticulous, fastidious, and patient natures, contrasting with the brash and impulsive Mills, who portrays himself as a crime-fighting hero. Critic Jonathan Rosenbaum observes that Mills and Somerset stand in stark contrast in terms of temperament, morality, intelligence, and personal connections. Somerset is analytical, wise, and experienced, while Mills is young, messy, and inexperienced but full of potential. Mills, characterized by his optimism and relatively light-hearted nature, moves to the city with the belief that he can have a positive influence. Tracy, according to Dyer, symbolizes potential virtue, but her impact is reduced because her appearances are infrequent, to conceal her eventual fate.

Dr. Denis Flannery identifies a homoerotic subtext among male characters, particularly drawing parallels between David Mills and John Doe and the homoerotic undertones of David and Jonathan from the Hebrew Bible, in which Jonathan also dies before David. Additional allusions include Somerset being named after a gay author, Tracy questioning Somerset's bachelor status, and Mills intentionally positioning Somerset at the opposite side of a table to avoid assumptions about their relationship. Flannery suggests a potential feminizing or transgender implication for Doe, given that "Doe" is also a term for a female deer, and implications of romantic interest in Mills. According to Flannery, Spacey's portrayal includes stereotypical homosexual inflections, and Doe's failed attempt at assuming a traditional husband role with Tracy hints at his sexual complexities or inadequacies.

Allen acknowledges the difficulty in ascribing psychological truth to Doe. Spacey sees Doe as a truly evil and psychologically unfathomable individual. Author Shona Hill notes Somerset's rejection of the idea that Doe's actions are incomprehensible, asserting that Doe is not the Devil but merely a man. A key distinction lies in framing John Doe's actions within a biblical context, giving them clear logic and purpose. During the final scene's car ride, Somerset detects a baser motive in Doe, suggesting he takes pleasure in killing people. Mills, dismissive of Doe as a mentally unstable common criminal, aligns with criminologist Cesare Lombroso's beliefs emphasizing psychological defects as the cause of criminal behavior. Oleson argues that Doe is the true architect of their narrative universe, dictating events while Mills and Somerset merely participate. Doe's notebooks offer insight into his misanthropic worldview, revealing disdain for the city and extreme reactions to mundane urban interactions. Tambling interprets the name "John Doe" as an allegorical placeholder for "Everyman", obscuring any true identity. Author David Deamer posits that Doe's true identity is inconsequential compared to his purpose.

== Legacy ==
=== Cultural influence ===
Retrospectives on Seven have named it a landmark in the serial-killer and crime-thriller genres. Critics have highlighted its uncompromising bleakness, neo-noir visual style, and the combination of visceral horror and philosophical themes as qualities that distinguish it from other serial-killer films.

The British Film Institute (BFI), The Guardian, and NME wrote that Seven influenced a wave of serial-killer thrillers, including Kiss the Girls (1997), The Bone Collector (1999), and Along Came a Spider (2001). Its commercial success is also credited with encouraging imitators, despite its unusually bleak tone and ending. The Guardian argued that many of these successors reproduced the film's elaborate murder set-pieces and visual style without its philosophical concerns, reducing the killer to a gimmick rather than a means of exploring morality and human behaviour. The BFI, Entertainment Weekly, and The Daily Telegraph described the Saw franchise as drawing influence from Seven, particularly its crime scenes. Fincher rejected suggestions that Seven originated the "torture porn" subgenre—which includes Saw—arguing that Seven relied on implication and the audience's imagination rather than graphic depictions of violence and gore.

Director Joe Russo said that Seven was among the films referenced during the development of Captain America: Civil War (2016). Director Lee Cronin cited Seven's detective narrative and the supernatural horror of Poltergeist (1982) as principal inspirations for his 2026 film The Mummy. In 2016, the BFI wrote that Seven's depiction of urban despair was an influence on Christopher Nolan's depiction of Gotham City in The Dark Knight trilogy (2005–2012) and Zack Snyder's interpretation of the DC Extended Universe (2013–2023). Others, such as Variety and Rolling Stone, credited Seven as a visual and narrative influence on Matt Reeves's The Batman (2022). A 2020 retrospective by NME highlighted Seven's influence on television, arguing that its investigative approach, serial-killer narratives, and visual style informed series such as CSI: Crime Scene Investigation (2000–2015), Hannibal (2013–2015), Prodigal Son (2019–2021), Supernatural (2005–2020), and True Detective (2014).

According to the BBC, Seven established Fincher as one of Hollywood's most iconoclastic directors. Publications, including the Los Angeles Times and IndieWire, described Seven as Fincher's breakthrough film and important in establishing his directorial reputation, (Note: Attributed to multiple references:) as well as it being a defining aspect of his career. According to IndieWire, the success of Seven enabled Fincher to exercise increasing creative control over his subsequent films, such as The Game (1997), Fight Club (1999), and Panic Room (2002).

The opening title sequence has been credited with a "renaissance" of title design, inspiring many imitators, particularly in the horror genre. The New York Times described it as one of the most important design innovations of the 1990s, while the Independent Film Channel ranked it as the third greatest film title sequence, behind those of Vertigo (1958) and A Hard Day's Night (1964). NME identified its scratchy, subliminal montage style in the opening credits of films including Red Dragon (2002), Taking Lives (2004), and The Bone Collector.

The Hollywood Reporter wrote that the ending elevated the film to classic status, while Entertainment Weekly and The Guardian emphasised its rejection of conventional crime-film expectations and Doe's successful completion of his plan. These publications credited the ending's enduring impact to its use of implication rather than explicit imagery of the box's contents, saying that the audience experiences the events through Somerset's reaction. (Note: Attributed to multiple references:) Although Tracy's head is never shown in the box, Fincher recalled meeting a viewer who believed she had seen it. He called the incident evidence that the audience's imagination could be more powerful than explicit imagery. Pitt's line, "What's in the box?", became one of the film's most recognisable popular-culture references. (Note: Attributed to multiple references:)

=== Modern reception ===
Retrospective critics have continued to regard Seven as one of the defining crime thrillers of the 1990s. (Note: Attributed to multiple references:) Writing in 2021, critic Adam Nayman argued that although some contemporary critics had dismissed the film as "style over substance", later commentary had reached a "mostly rapturous critical consensus", citing Richard Dyer's 1999 BFI Classics study as evidence of the film's enduring critical and scholarly attention.

Later critical assessments have praised the film's atmosphere, visual style, bleak worldview, and uncompromising ending. (Note: Attributed to multiple references:) Roger Ebert included the film in his Great Movies series in 2011, praising its characterisation, visual style, and construction, and describing it as among the darkest mainstream Hollywood thrillers ever made. Time Out described the film as the point at which Fincher's "fearsome vision arrived uncut", arguing that its visual style had proven more durable than The Silence of the Lambs. Empire similarly characterised the film as a work of "Gothic horror and spiritual unease".

The film has also received continued recognition in retrospective rankings and industry polls. It ranked 134th in Empire's 2008 list of The 500 Greatest Movies of All Time—based on polls of readers, Hollywood actors, and film critics—85th in a 2014 poll of 2,120 entertainment industry professionals conducted by The Hollywood Reporter, and 87th in Time Out's 2026 list of the 100 greatest films. The film has a score of 65 out of 100 on Metacritic based on 22 critics' reviews, indicating "generally favorable reviews". Review aggregator Rotten Tomatoes offers an 84% approval rating from the aggregated reviews of 156 critics, with an average score of 7.7/10. The website's critical consensus says: "A brutal, relentlessly grimy shocker with taut performances, slick gore effects, and a haunting finale".

== Proposed sequel ==
In 2001, New Line Cinema proposed a sequel, reportedly titled Ei8ht, based on a repurposed 1996 spec script, Solace, written by Ted Griffin and Sean Bailey and influenced by Seven. The proposed sequel would have followed William Somerset as he pursued a psychic serial killer, with reports that Somerset would develop similar abilities. In a 2021 interview, Griffin said that the latter idea was false. The project was ultimately short-lived. Fincher dismissed the idea of a sequel, saying, "I would be less interested in that than I would in having cigarettes put out in my eyes". The script was made into the standalone thriller Solace (2015).
