= Guilty (Gravity Kills song) =

Remix album (single) by Gravity Kills
- Released: February 13, 1996
- Genre: Industrial rock, trance
- Length: 4:05 (album version)
- Label: TVT

Gravity Kills chronology
Guilty (1996)	Gravity Kills (1996)

Music video
- "Guilty" on Vimeo

Guilty is a remix single by Gravity Kills, released by TVT Records.

It also includes the album version of the song, and tracks 6 and 7 include both the remix by tomandandy, and the demo version of "Goodbye".

The Juno Reactor remix of the song was featured in the Stanley Cup FMV sequence in NHL '99 and featured in the film, Beowulf.

Noticeably absent from the "Guilty" single is the song's 'Single Remix', which played on radio stations and garnered Gravity Kills brief mainstream popularity in 1996. However, the single version was included on the Se7en soundtrack, which was released before the band's popularity in 1995. Although the song on the soundtrack is in fact, the 'Single Remix' version, it is not denoted as such on the soundtrack packaging.

"Guilty" was heard in the promo for the fifth season of True Blood.

== Track listing ==
No.	Title	Length
1.	"Guilty" (Juno Reactor Remix)	6:20
2.	"Guilty" (Roli Mosimann Remix)	6:19
3.	"Guilty" (Youth's Blood Orchid Sky Remix)	6:55
4.	"Guilty" (Album Version)	4:05
5.	"Guilty" (Youth's Art As Prostitution Remix)	6:26
6.	"Goodbye" (tomandandy Remix)	5:07
7.	"Goodbye" (Demo version)	3:11
8.	"Guilty" (Roli Mosimann Instrumental)	6:20
9.	"Guilty" (Juno Reactor Instrumental)	5:51
10.	"Guilty" (Nothing Remix)	5:03
11.	"Guilty" (Lo-Fi Remix)	3:37

== Chart positions ==
Chart (1996)	Peak position
U.S. Billboard Hot 100	86
U.S. Billboard Modern Rock Tracks	24
U.S. Billboard Mainstream Rock Tracks	39
UK Charts	79

Image from the "Guilty" music video showing Jeff Scheel
