= New England Quilt Museum =

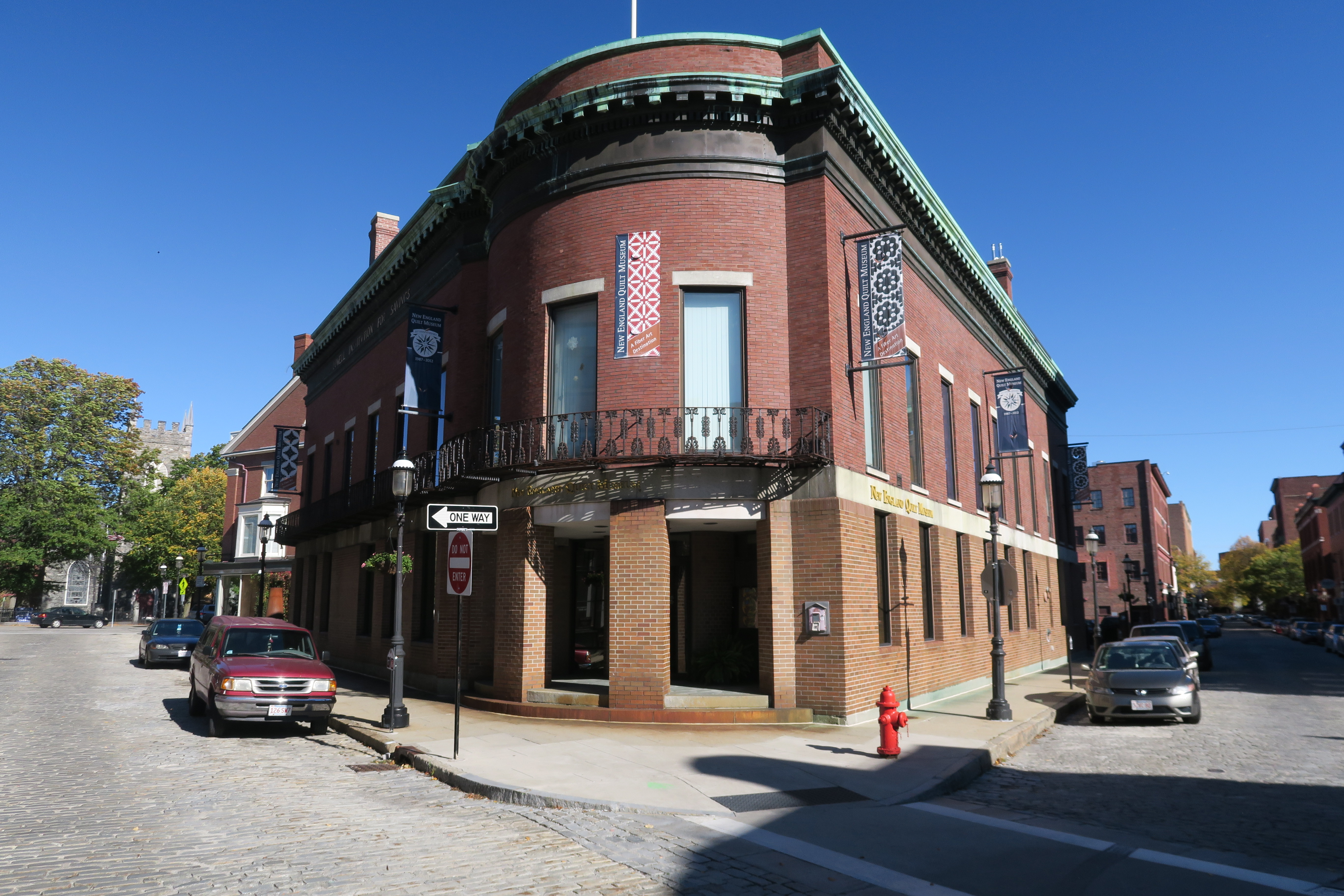
- Established: June 1987
- Location: Lowell, Massachusetts
- Coordinates: 42.6454°N 71.3121°W
- Type: Art museum
- Key holdings: Late 18th century to contemporary art quilts
- Collections: Textile arts
- Collection size: 500
- Visitors: 6,000 / year
- Public transit access: Lowell MBTA Station
- Parking: National Historic Park lot (no charge)
- Website: www.nequiltmuseum.org

The New England Quilt Museum, founded in 1987, is located in downtown Lowell, Massachusetts and is the only institute in the Northeastern United States solely dedicated to the art and craft of quilting. It is the second-oldest quilt museum in the United States. It houses special and permanent exhibits, a library, a museum shop, and classrooms. Collections are strong in 19th century quilts, with a geographic focus on New England.

== History ==
The museum opened in 1987, and was founded and staffed by quiltmakers. It has been since its start committed to both craft and fine arts quilts, with exhibits and classes incorporating contemporary as well as traditional fiber arts approaches.

The museum moved into its current space in 1994, after a flood in its previous building. The new space, the historic Lowell Institute for Savings building, gave the museum more room for exhibits, collection storage and preparation, classrooms, a museum shop, and events. It is located near the Lowell National Historical Park, which highlights Lowell's centrality to the 19th century textile trade and Industrial Revolution in the United States.

== Activities ==
In 2000, the museum founded the Lowell Quilt Festival, which has expanded to involve multiple partners across the city and region. IMAGES, a top juried show that began in 1983, is also part of the festival; entries are from across the United States and Canada. The Lowell Quilt Festival was held for the last time in 2014.

MassQuilts, a volunteer-led statewide project to document the history of quilts, holds sessions at the museum the second Thursday of every month. The organization was started in 1994, and has documented more than 8,000 quilts. MassQuilts has also developed traveling shows, exhibits for the museum, and Massachusetts Quilts, Our Common Wealth a university press book on the history of Massachusetts quilts and exhibits for the museum.

== See also ==
- American Textile History Museum
- Lowell National Historical Park
