= Gravity Kills =

American industrial rock band

- Gravity Kills in 1995

Background information
- Origin: St. Louis, Missouri, U.S.
- Genres: Industrial rock; industrial metal
- Years active: 1994–2003, 2005–2012, 2023
- Labels: TVT, Sanctuary
- Members: Jeff Scheel; Matt Dudenhoffer; Douglas Firley; Kurt Kerns
- Past members: Greg Miller; Brad Booker

Gravity Kills is an American industrial rock band from St. Louis, Missouri, formed in 1994. After releasing three albums, they disbanded in 2003, followed by reunions from 2005 to 2012, and another in 2023.

After a brief period on the regional scene, the band signed to TVT Records in late 1995. Gravity Kills first gained mainstream attention via their 1996 self-titled debut album, which contained the single "Guilty". "Guilty" peaked at No. 86 on the US Hot 100 Chart and at No. 79 on the UK Singles Chart. Ultimately, the Gravity Kills album sold approximately 500,000 copies. Their follow-up album in 1998, Perversion, was less successful than its predecessor, although "Falling" appeared on the US Mainstream Rock Chart. Gravity Kills switched to the Sanctuary Records label for their third and final album in 2002, Superstarved. Although the lead single "One Thing" was the band's highest position on the US Mainstream Rock Chart (No. 24), they disbanded in January 2003 due to a lack of label support and internal issues. They played various one-off shows between 2005 and 2012, followed by a second reunion in 2023.

Their music was described by one critic as "a blending of eerie industrial rock with a pop-infused melodic chorus and a bit of hard-core head banging." Overall, Gravity Kills' songs have been featured on soundtracks for a variety of media, such as Mortal Kombat, Se7en, Escape from L.A., and Kissing a Fool, in addition to video games such as the Test Drive franchise. Gravity Kills toured with a mixture of bands during their first run, such as Sex Pistols, Sevendust, Local H, Flaw, Sister Machine Gun, and Pigface.

== History ==
=== Formation, name, and self-titled debut album (1994–1996) ===
As the band was forming in 1994, keyboardist Doug Firley was reading an article where he misread what he thought said "like the Gravity Kills." He went back through the article and could not find what he thought he had read. Firley told drummer Kurt Kerns and guitarist Matt Dudenhoeffer about it and thought that Gravity Kills would be a great name for the band.

In response to a contest from St. Louis area radio station KPNT for a compilation CD of local artists, the trio brought in vocalist Jeff Scheel (Kerns' cousin) to record and mix a track in one week during the summer of 1994. The resulting song, "Guilty", was given heavy airplay and quickly became the most requested song at the station. The band continued to write and record songs throughout 1995.

Although nearly an entire year had passed since "Guilty" was first released, Gravity Kills finally played their first live show in November 1995 at a soldout venue in St. Louis. Later that month, the band officially signed a record deal with TVT Records. The band's first self-titled album was released in March 1996, and peaked at No. 89 on the Billboard 200 chart and No. 1 on the Billboard Heatseekers chart. "Guilty", the first single, found heavy airplay upon its release. It peaked at No. 24 on the Billboard Modern Rock chart, No. 39 on the Billboard Mainstream Rock chart, and at No. 86 on the Billboard 100 chart. Videos were made for "Guilty", "Enough", and "Down". "Enough" in particular had peaked at No. 98 on the UK Singles Chart. Hollywood also embraced the band's music as they landed songs on three high-profile soundtracks: Se7en with "Guilty", Mortal Kombat with "Goodbye (Demo Version)", and Escape From L.A. with "Blame (L.A. Remix)". The band partially re-recorded the song "Blame" for the Escape From L.A. soundtrack, and it was released as an individual single.

Gravity Kills toured in the summer of 1996 with the Sex Pistols and embarked on a solo tour that fall. With the success of the first album, the band quickly established itself on the rock scene as one of the most promising young bands in the industrial music scene. Gravity Kills' album was also released worldwide with chart success in England, Germany, and France.

=== Manipulated, live tours, and Perversion (1997–2000) ===
In 1997, TVT Records released a remix compilation album called Manipulated which contained remixes from the band's self-titled debut album songs "Guilty", "Blame", "Enough", "Down", and "Here". That year, they contributed a song to the Gary Numan tribute album Random, "Poetry and Power". Gravity Kills also briefly collaborated with the musician Moby on a song titled "Suffocating". It was meant to be included on the soundtrack to the film Spawn; however, Moby disliked the outcome, and instead worked with Butthole Surfers for the soundtrack. The outtake was later released online.

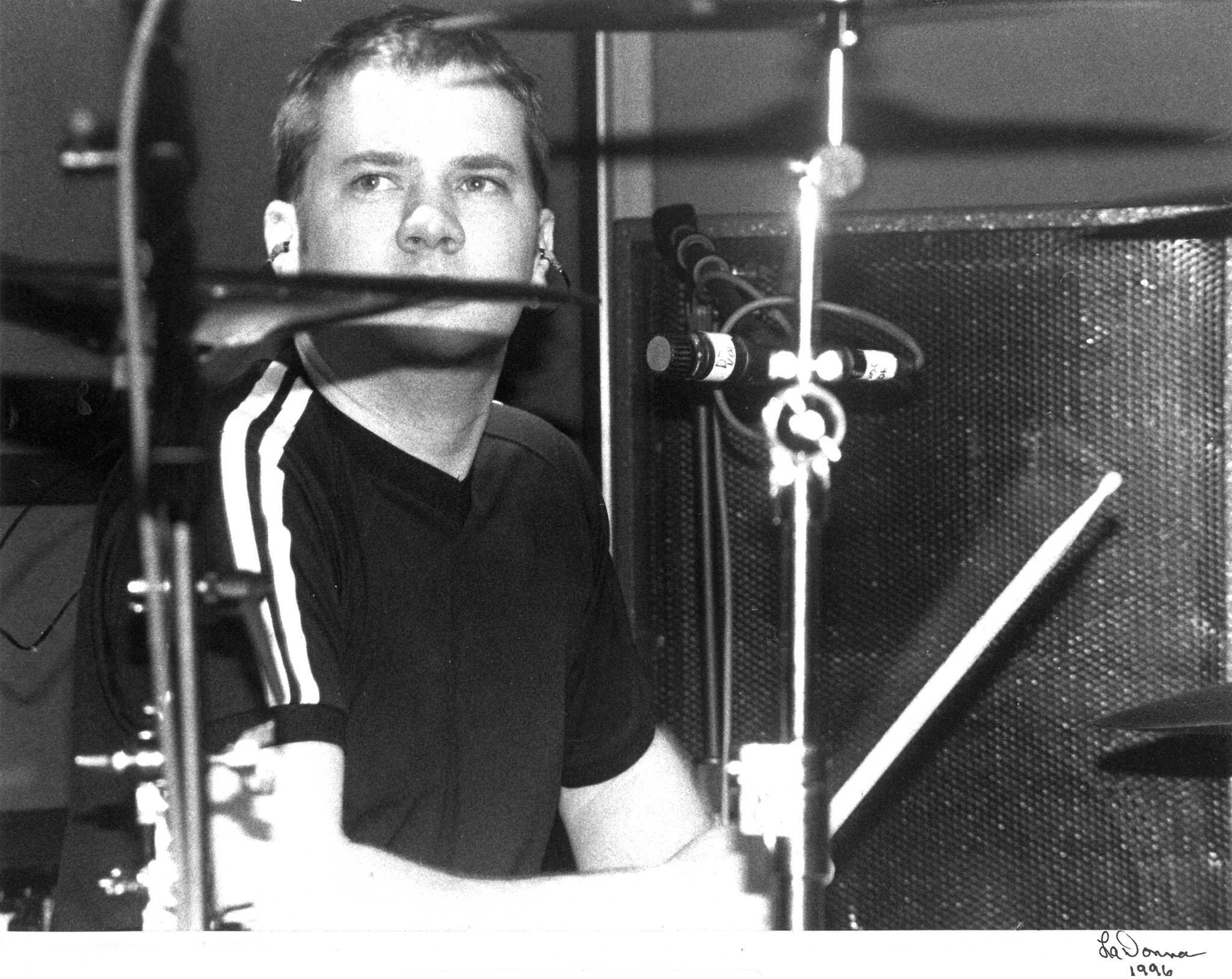
Drummer Kurt Kerns performing in 1998 in Tampa, Florida

On April 19, 1998, Scheel suffered a whiplash when he got overexcited during a warm-up gig at the University Wellness & Activities in San Antonio, Texas. He had not performed live with the band since a previous live concert at the Q101 Festival in Chicago, IL on October 16, 1997. The injury happened at a club in what was supposed to be a low-key gig that attracted 6,000 fans, according to the band's label, TVT Records. The injury, which put Scheel out of commission for a few weeks, came less than a week before Junkie XL leader Tom Holkenborg injured his back in an onstage accident; ironically, Junkie XL and Gravity Kills were scheduled to join British band Pitchshifter on a U.S. tour on June 3.

The band released their second studio album in June 1998, titled Perversion. The album was less successful than their self-titled debut but still sold well, peaking at No. 107 on the Billboard 200 chart. The single "Falling" peaked at No. 35 on the Billboard Mainstream Rock chart, and was featured in the 1998 racing video game Test Drive 5 along with Pitchshifter, Fear Factory, Junkie XL, and KMFDM. "Alive" and "Drown" also appeared in another game from the same franchise in 1998, Test Drive Off-Road 2. On July 1, 1998, at the Summerfest in Milwaukee, Wisconsin, Scheel got the whole crowd chanting "Fuck you!" while the show was being broadcast live on a mainstream rock local radio station, Lazer 103 FM. This was a familiar phrase to the July 2, 1997, Summerfest. The station's DJ tried to get the crowd to stop, but he was having mic problems and the crowd ignored him. In August 1999, drummer Kerns had left the band, reasons for leaving as a chance for him to spend time with his family and to return to practicing architecture. He was initially replaced by Greg Miller (who played with another St. Louis band, Radio Iodine). After a handful of shows in 2000, Brad Booker (former drummer for the band Stir) joined on drums.

=== Superstarved, Doug Firley's injury, and split-up (2001–2003) ===
After the release of Perversion, numerous recording sessions commenced for the third album between June 1999 and August 2001. An entire tracklist was completed; however, the band was dissatisfied with the mixes and returned to the studio. Gravity Kills also signed with their new label Sanctuary Records. The initial sessions would later be leaked online (by Scheel himself), which also contained six songs that had not made the final album's cut.

In March 2002, Sanctuary Records released the band's third album, Superstarved. The UK version of the album was released by Mayan Records (which was a part of Sanctuary Records) and the Japan version of the album was released by Victor Entertainment. The single "One Thing" had charted at No. 24 on the Billboard Mainstream Rock chart, the band's highest position to date. Gravity Kills co-headlined a tour with American Head Charge in promotion of the album throughout April. The following month, on May 2, keyboardist Firley sustained serious injury to his hand in Allentown, Pennsylvania, while performing in front of a sold-out crowd. The injury occurred when Firley dropped the 300 pound custom-made spring-loaded steel keyboard on his hand, shattering the bones in his right ring finger during the band's performance of their single "One Thing". The band returned home to St. Louis after finishing the weekend shows in New Jersey and New York for Firley to seek treatment and had to sell off the components of the recording studio it owned, thus ending the cycle of tour dates. Firley later underwent surgery to repair his hand.

On January 4, 2003, the band officially broke up, a statement posted on the site read as follows:

[...]Your assumptions are true. Gravity Kills are (sic) no longer together and will not be producing music together under the name Gravity Kills. Each of the band members has moved on to other endeavors. The reasons for this are various and, unfortunately for legal reasons cannot be mentioned here. The band as always, appreciates all the support throughout the years and considers their fans to be the best fans in the world. Those band members still associated with the music industry hope to see you soon with their new projects.

The band members scattered to different occupations. Matt Dudenhoeffer returned to an engineering job outside of the music industry. Doug Firley went on tour with Alicia Keys as a keyboard tech and then worked as a draftsman before forming the production team Shock City Productions with Chris Loesch. Brad Booker became the new drummer for the band Apartment 26, and later reunited with his previous band Stir on multiple occasions. Jeff Scheel went to work at the Box Talent Agency as an agent for corporations, casinos, and clubs. Scheel was also the vocalist of a band called Star 13 (stylized as *13).

=== Reformation, performances, and abandoned fourth studio album (2005–2012) ===
On October 28, 2005, Gravity Kills reunited to perform for a self-created Halloween music festival in St. Louis, Missouri entitled The Killoween Freakshow. It was initially to be an annual event, as another Killoween occurred on October 28, 2006, at Pop's Nightclub and Bar. Due to a scheduling conflict, Killoween was instead The Nightmare Before Thanksgiving on November 21, 2007. Gravity Kills confirmed rumors that had persisted over the past year on October 20, 2009, and the band announced that they were working on new music.

The band performed in Tulsa at the Hard Rock Hotel and Casino on May 7, 2010, and at Roberts Orpheum Theater in St. Louis, MO on June 25, 2010, as part of a benefit show. The band was working on a follow-up album, as they maintained an online diary regarding their progress. They revealed a working title for one of the songs, "Again".

=== Vinyl reissue and future plans (2018–present) ===
On December 13, 2018, Gravity Kills noted on their official Facebook page that the last time the band had performed together was on November 23, 2012, at The Pageant in St. Louis, Missouri. The band was considered to be in hiatus, but in November 2022 they previewed a vinyl reissue of their self-titled debut album. The post displayed the tentative vinyl packaging and no release date was given at that point. The vinyl pressing of Gravity Kills was eventually released on May 19, 2023. Not long after, the band announced a reunion show in St. Louis for November 11, 2023; thus, it became their first live show in 11 years.

== Band members ==
- Jeff Scheel – vocals, occasional guitar (1994–2003, 2005–2012, 2023)
- Matt Dudenhoeffer – guitar (1994–2003, 2005–2012, 2023)
- Doug Firley – bass, keyboards, programming (1994–2003, 2005–2012, 2023)
- Kurt Kerns – drums, vocals, bass, guitar (1994–1999, 2005–2012, 2023)

=== Former ===
- Greg Miller – drums (1999–2000)
- Brad Booker – drums (2000–2003)

== Discography ==
=== Studio albums ===
Year	Title
1996	Gravity Kills
1998	Perversion
2002	Superstarved

=== Remix albums/singles ===
Year	Title
1996	Guilty (Remix Single)
1997	Manipulated

=== Charting albums and singles ===
==== Albums ====
- 1996 Gravity Kills Heatseekers No. 1
- 1996 Gravity Kills The Billboard 200 No. 89
- 1998 Perversion The Billboard 200 No. 107
- 2002 Superstarved CMJ Retail Chart No. 62

==== Singles ====
Year	Song	Modern Rock	Mainstream Rock	The Billboard 100	UK charts	Album
1996	"Guilty"	24	39	86	77	Gravity Kills
1996	"Enough"	-	-	-	98	Gravity Kills
1996	"Down"	-	-	-	-	Gravity Kills
1996	"Blame (L.A. Remix)"	-	-	-	-	Escape From L.A. (soundtrack)
1998	"Alive"	-	-	-	-	Perversion
1998	"Falling"	-	35	-	-	Perversion
2002	"One Thing"	-	24	-	-	Superstarved
2002	"Love, Sex, and Money"	-	-	-	-	Superstarved
2003	"Personal Jesus"	-	-	-	-	Superstarved
"—" denotes a release that did not chart.

== Music videos ==
Year	Title	Director(s)
1995	"Guilty"	Rocky Morton
1996	"Blame (L.A. Remix)"	Peter Christopherson
1996	"Enough"	Rocky Morton & Annabel Jankel
1997	"Down"	-
2002	"Love, Sex, and Money"	Marc Romero

== Other appearances ==
Year	Song	Title
1995	"Guilty"	Se7en film
1995	"Goodbye (Demo Version)"	Mortal Kombat film / soundtrack
1996	"Blame (L.A. Remix)"	Escape from L.A. film
1997	"Enough (Extrinsic Remix)"	Hoax IV Brass Monkeys film
1997	"Blame"	Test Drive: Off-Road video game
1997	"Enough"	Test Drive: Off-Road
1997	"Guilty"	Test Drive: Off-Road
1997	"Enough"	Airbag film
1997	"Suffocating" Feat. Moby	outtake of Spawn film soundtrack
1998	"Last"	Kissing a Fool film
1998	"Guilty (Juno Reactor Remix)"	NHL '99 video game
1998	"Falling"	Test Drive 5 video game
1998	"Alive"	Test Drive: Off-Road 2 video game
1998	"Drown"	Test Drive Off-Road 2
1999	"Guilty (Juno Reactor Remix)"	Beowulf film
2000	"Guilty"	Vampire: Redemption video game
2000	"If"	MTV Sports: Pure Ride video game
2002	"Guilty"	Evil on Queen Street film written and directed by Matt Spease
2012	"Guilty"	True Blood TV series season 5 promo
2019	"Enough"	Treadstone TV series episode "The Berlin Proposal" closing credits
