= Mortal Kombat (1995 score) =

Mortal Kombat: Original Motion Picture Score

Film score by George S. Clinton
- Released: October 11, 1995
- Genre: Electronica
- Length: 42:01
- Label: Rykodisc

Mortal Kombat chronology
| Mortal Kombat: Original Motion Picture Soundtrack (1994) | Mortal Kombat: Original Motion Picture Score (1995) | Mortal Kombat Annihilation (1997) |

Mortal Kombat: Original Motion Picture Score is the instrumental score album released to accompany the Mortal Kombat (1995) film. The music was composed by George S. Clinton with additional guitar work provided by Buckethead and drums by Brain.

Clinton based his main themes on Japanese taiko drums, emphasizing the film's mystical atmosphere and Asian-influenced style. He used Shakuhachi flute, didgeridoos and a Tuvan throat singer to give the film a more exotic musical landscape than following traditional orchestral scores.

In a 2015 interview, Clinton said,

For the first test screening they had put a temporary score under it that was mainly traditional orchestral action music, and it became clear that the target audience, which was used to hearing techno music blasting during game play, was not happy with that approach. So that gave me the opportunity to come up with an approach I called “Techno-Taiko-Orcho.” My score would have a techno core with a layer of Asian ethnic instruments (Taiko drums, shakuhachi, Tuvan throat singer) surrounded by an orchestra. But not just a regular orchestra, a Testosterone Orchestra. No treble clef instruments (no flutes, clarinets, trumpets, violins, etc.). Just 18 violas, 14 celli, six basses and lots of low brass — and percussion. It was massive. When music supervisors John Houlihan and Sharon Boyle introduced me to guitar wizard Buckethead, I knew he would become a major element in my score as well.

Clinton created the sound effect that suggests the presence of Shang Tsung in the film with a Tuvan throat singer which along with other segments of this score were used extensively in other film teasers and trailers, most notable in Roland Emmerich's Godzilla and the Final Destination franchise.

The album contains two tracks not used in the film named "Farewell" and "Kids". The latter can be heard at the end of the sequel Mortal Kombat Annihilation.

== Reception ==
Los Angeles Times critic Kevin Thomas characterized it as a "driving, hard-edged" score.

== Track listing ==
1. "A Taste of Things to Come"
2. "Liu Vs. Sub-Zero" featuring Buckethead
3. "It Has Begun"
4. "The Garden" featuring Buckethead
5. "Goro Vs. Art" featuring Buckethead
6. "Banquet" featuring Buckethead
7. "Liu Vs. Kitana"
8. "Liu's Dream" featuring Buckethead
9. "Liu Vs. Reptile" featuring Buckethead
10. "Stairway"
11. "Goro Goro" featuring Buckethead
12. "Kidnapped"
13. "Zooom"
14. "Johnny Vs. Scorpion" featuring Buckethead
15. "Hand and Shadow" featuring Buckethead
16. "Scorpion and Sub-Zero" featuring Buckethead
17. "Soul Snatchin'"
18. "On the Beach"
19. "Johnny Cage" featuring Buckethead
20. "Goro Chase" featuring Buckethead
21. "Evening Bells"
22. "Monks"
23. "Friends"
24. "Flawless Victory" featuring Buckethead
25. "Farewell"
26. "Kids"
