= Bile discography =

The discography for American industrial metal band Bile consists of the following:

== Suckpump (1994 Energy) Length: 39:34 ==
1. Head (5:26)
2. Burnt (3:56)
3. Ura Fucking Loser (5:16)
4. I Reject (2:56)
5. Feeling Like Shit (4:13)
6. Get Out (4:21)
7. Suckpump (9:01)
8. Get Out (Radio Edit) (4:25)

RELEASED: September 8, 1994, LABEL: Energy Records FORMAT: LP INFO: "Suckpump" is now out of print. A remastered version can be found in the "Frankenhole" digipak. Written and recorded by Krztoff. Produced and engineered by Slave, Void, and Krztoff.

== Teknowhore (1996 Energy) Length: 66:55 ==
1. Intro (2:10)
2. Teknowhore (2:08)
3. Weather Control (4:38)
4. No One I Call Friend (6:28)
5. Habitual Sphere (4:38)
6. Compound Pressure (5:14)
7. Interstate Hate Song (3:35)
8. Green Day (1:12)
9. No I Don't Know (2:31)
10. Suckers (2:18)
11. Lowest Form (4:54)
12. You Can't Love This (Pt. 1) (1:01)
13. You Can't Love This (Pt. 2) (6:08)
14. You Can't Love This (Pt. 3) (3:21)
15. You Can't Love This (Pt. 4) (6:26)
16. Solitude Is Bliss (10:15)

RELEASED: June 18, 1996, LABEL: Energy Records FORMAT: LP INFO: "Teknowhore" is now out of print. A remastered version can be found in the "Frankenhole" digipak. Written and recorded by Krztoff. Produced by Krztoff and Slave. Mixed by Slave. Engineered by Steve Spaperri and Patrick Gordon

== The Darkbeat EP (1996 Energy) Length: 21:24 ==
1. Planet Weather Control (9:05)
2. The Phantom God (12:19)

RELEASED: 1996 LABEL: Energy Records FORMAT: EP INFO: "The Darkbeat EP" is a vinyl record released as a promotional item with two remixed tracks. The tracks are versions of "Weather Control" and "Lowest Form." Remixed and produced by Slave and Krztoff with assistance by Myk Amoia

== Biledegradable (1997 Energy) Length: 44:11 ==
1. My Generation (2:37)
2. Rubber Love (6:00)
3. Degradable (6:40)
4. Fascion (Demo) (3:59)
5. My Generation (Original Demo) (3:31)
6. The Phantom God (12:19)
7. Planet Weather Control (9:05)

RELEASED: March 18, 1997, LABEL: Energy Records FORMAT: EP INFO: "Biledegradable" is now out of print. Tracks 6 and 7 were originally found on "The Darkbeat EP" vinyl. "My Generation" written by Peter Townshend. Produced, engineered, and mixed by Krztoff.

== Sex Reflex (1999-2003 Bile Style) Length: 53:18 ==
1. World War Four (0:35)
2. Betty Page (4:59)
3. Wet Dream (0:26)
4. Sex Reflex (3:18)
5. Rock Is Dead (In Bed) (3:20)
6. To Belong, My New Uniform (2:05)
7. Manchurian Candy-Date (1:37)
8. In League (4:51)
9. Double Fang (3:34)
10. Vampyre Hunter K (1:59)
11. When the Dead Come Home (5:12)
12. It'll Never Happen to Me (4:17)
13. Relix (6:47)
14. The Hunger, The Feeding, The Afterglow (10:18)

RELEASED: September 23, 2003, 2000 original 3 different versions tracks are different on each version LABEL: Bile Style Records FORMAT: LP INFO: Produced, mixed, mastered, recorded, and engineered by Krztoff. "Sex Reflex" was remastered and reissued in September 2003 with alternative cover art, a remixed track, and exclusion of the track "Manchurian Candy Date."

== Nightmare Before Krztoff (1999-2003 Bile Style) Length: 64:00 ==
1. The Serial Killer Blues (5:27)
2. In My Eye (5:24)
3. Melas Chasm (5:16)
4. You Don't Turn Me (5:28)
5. Submission (4:24)
6. The Day the Aliens Landed (6:11)
7. Death Buzz Lust (7:41)
8. Venom On My Breath (6:52)
9. Extremeties (3:31)
10. Dr. Quogue's Metahdone Reducer (9:30)
11. Love Stinks (4:15)

RELEASED: May 16, 2000, LABEL: Bile Style Records FORMAT: LP INFO: Dubbed as Krztoff's 'solo' cd. Produced, mixed, and mastered by Krztoff during the "Sex Reflex" sessions that didn't quite fit into the Bile realm. "Love Stinks" written by Peter Wolf and Seth Justman.

== Demonic Electronic (2001-2003 Bile Style) 63:37 ==
1. The Devil's Bile (4:22)
2. Legion (3:47)
3. Demonic Electronic (3:03)
4. Celebrity (5:58)
5. Prime Time Loser (5:25)
6. Bad Karma (6:09)
7. The Hatred Acid (3:33)
8. Buried in the Back (2:17)
9. Demons (3:36)
10. Jerk (8:27)
11. Clones (We're All) (3:07)
12. Jerk (Atkins Diet Mix) (4:30)
13. Celebrity (Radio Rehash) (4:02)
14. Say Hello (2:53)
15. Teknowhore (KMFDM Demo '93) (2:28)

RELEASED: October 29, 2002, 2 different versions released and tracks are different on each. LABEL: Bile Style Records FORMAT: LP INFO: "Demonic Electronic" was written, performed, produced, recorded, mixed, engineered, and mastered by Krztoff. "Clones (We're All)" written by Alice Cooper.

== The Copy Machine (2002 Bile Style) 33:44 ==
1. Clones (We're All) (3:07)
2. Do You Wanna Touch Me There (Oh Yeah) (3:45)
3. We Got The Beat (2:21)
4. Love Stinks (4:15)
5. My Generation (2:39)
6. Mid-Life Crisis (4:01)
7. Scentless Apprentice (3:54)
8. Not to Touch the Earth (4:37)
9. Creep (5:05)

RELEASED: October 12, 2002, LABEL: Bile Style Records FORMAT: LP INFO: A collection of Bile's cover songs. All songs recorded, mixed, and mastered by Krztoff. Tracks written by, in order: Alice Cooper, Gary Glitter, The Go-Go's, The J. Geils Band, The Who, Faith No More, Nirvana, The Doors, and Black from the Dead.

== Frankenhole (2003 Bile Style) Length: 106:29 ==
Disc One:

1. Head (5:26)
2. Burnt (3:56)
3. Ura Fucking Loser (5:16)
4. I Reject (2:56)
5. Feeling Like Shit (4:13)
6. Get Out (4:21)
7. Suckpump (9:01)
8. Get Out (Radio Edit) (4:25)

Disc Two:

1. Intro (2:09)
2. Teknowhore (2:08)
3. Weather Control (4:38)
4. No One I Call Friend (6:28)
5. Habitual Sphere (4:38)
6. Compound Pressure (5:14)
7. Interstate Hate Song (3:35)
8. Green Day (1:12)
9. No I Don't Know (2:31)
10. Suckers (2:18)
11. Lowest Form (4:54)
12. You Can't Love This (Pt. 1) (1:00)
13. You Can't Love This (Pt. 2) (6:08)
14. You Can't Love This (Pt. 3) (3:21)
15. You Can't Love This (Pt. 4) (6:26)
16. Solitude Is Bliss (10:15)

RELEASED: November 18, 2003, LABEL: Bile Style Records FORMAT: LP INFO: Full title: "Frankenhole - The Reanimation of Dead Tissue." This is a remastered compilation of Bile's first two albums, "Suckpump" and "Teknowhore." All songs written, recorded, mixed, mastered, and engineered by Krztoff.

== Regurge: A Bucket of Bile, Best of Bile (2004 Bile Style) Length: 63:03 ==
1. Get Out (4:21)
2. No One I Call Friend (6:28)
3. In League (4:51)
4. Legion (3:48)
5. I Reject (2:56)
6. Weather Control (4:38)
7. Sex Reflex (3:45)
8. Jerk (9:33)
9. Ura Fucking Loser (5:16)
10. Teknowhore (2:08)
11. Betty Page (4:59)
12. The Devil's Bile (4:22)
13. Celebrity (5:58)

RELEASED: December 10, 2004, LABEL: Bile Style Records FORMAT: LP INFO: Full title: "Regurge: A Bucket of Bile Best Of." This is a best of compilation containing all your favorite Bile tracks. All songs written, recorded, mixed, mastered, and engineered by Krztoff.

== Hate Radio (2009 Bile Style) ==
1. Like The Plague
2. Take Target Out
3. World Up Your Ass
4. Dr. Depression
5. Who the Fuck
6. I Don't Need a Reason
7. The Weakest One
8. Whores of War
9. Hate Radio
10. The Late Great United States
11. Your Last Minute
12. The Banned After
13. Danz De Bear
14. The Tear in The Fabric of Time

== Sharks and Covid, Vol. 1 (EP) (2021 Bile Style Records) 14:55 ==
1. Heavy on Me (3:29)
2. Shark Frenzy at Brooklyn Beach (2:59)
3. M.H.T.D. (2:57)
4. NYC Variant (5:30)

RELEASED: May 5, 2021, LABEL: Bile Style Records FORMAT: Digital Download INFO: Created during and inspired by the covid-19 pandemic quarantine and multiple unreported fatal shark attacks worldwide. All instruments, programming and mixing by Christoph Liggio. Additional horns by Roger Ebner. Additional drums on "Heavy on Me" by Steve Gallo. Recorded in Brooklyn, NY and Chicago, IL.

== Video ==
- When The Dead Come Home VHS & DVD

== Motion picture soundtracks ==
- Mortal Kombat featured the song "I REJECT"
- Strangeland featured the exclusive song "IN LEAGUE" (1998), The band is also featured in the movie performing live.
- Traces of Death V (2000) featured several songs from the album Sex Reflex

== Other releases ==
- DNA sampler Vol 1 (1995) Ura Fucking Loser
- Energy Records Sampler (1997) Rubber Love, Weather Control
- Anthems of Rust and Decay: A Tribute To Marilyn Manson (2000) Tourniquet
- The Broken Machine: A Tribute to Nine Inch Nails (2001) Happiness in Slavery
- United: 02 - The Sound of the Underground (2002) Jerk-Marty Atkins mix
- Mutations: A Tribute to Alice Cooper (2002) Clones (we're all)
- A Tribute of the Year: Tribute to Faith No More (2002) Midlife Crisis
