= Beverly Hills Ninja =

1997 film by Dennis Dugan

- Theatrical release poster
- Directed by: Dennis Dugan
- Written by: Mark Feldberg; Mitch Klebanoff
- Produced by: Bradley Jenkel; Brad Krevoy; Steven Stabler; Mitch Klebanoff
- Starring: Chris Farley; Nicollette Sheridan; Nathaniel Parker; Chris Rock; Robin Shou
- Cinematography: Arthur Albert
- Edited by: Jeff Gourson
- Music by: George S. Clinton
- Production companies: TriStar Pictures; Motion Picture Corporation of America
- Distributed by: Sony Pictures Releasing
- Release date: January 17, 1997
- Running time: 88 minutes
- Country: United States
- Languages: English; Japanese
- Budget: $18 million
- Box office: $37.9 million

Beverly Hills Ninja is a 1997 American martial-arts comedy film directed by Dennis Dugan, and written by Mark Feldberg and Mitch Klebanoff. The film stars Chris Farley as an inept white ninja who travels to Beverly Hills to investigate a murder surrounding a counterfeiting operation. Nicollette Sheridan, Nathaniel Parker, Chris Rock, and Robin Shou costar in the film.

Upon its release on January 17, 1997, Beverly Hills Ninja received negative reviews from critics but was a modest commercial success, grossing $37.9 million worldwide on a $18 million budget. It was the last film starring Farley to be released in his lifetime, as he died later that same year on December 18, 1997.

== Plot ==
A clan of ninjas in Japan finds a chest washed ashore with a white baby boy inside. One of their legends speaks of a foreign white man who would become a master like no other. Haru is raised with the expectation that he will become the legendary master and trained in ninjutsu as the "Great White Ninja". As Haru grows into adulthood, doubts are raised as he is clumsy, overweight, lacks his ninja skills, and he fails to graduate as a ninja. Left alone to protect the temple while the clan is on a mission, Haru disguises himself as a ninja when an American woman, Sally Jones, comes seeking assistance. She tells Haru she is suspicious of her boyfriend, Martin Tanley, and asks him to investigate. Haru discovers Tanley and his bodyguard, Nobu, are in league with the Yakuza, are involved in a money counterfeiting business during which Martin winds up killing one of his dealers, but Haru cannot tell Sally before she leaves. Haru is also spotted by the police and blamed for the murder. Haru takes a plane to Beverly Hills to find Sally. The clan's sensei sends Haru's adoptive brother, Gobei, to secretly watch over and protect him during his mission.

Haru checks in at a Beverly Hills hotel, where he befriends its bellboy, Joey Washington, and teaches him some ninja lessons. Haru tracks Tanley and Nobu to a nightclub in Little Tokyo, where they attempt to retrieve some counterfeiting plates from their rival gang. The gangs fight, resulting in the deaths of two of the rival gang members, for which Haru once again finds himself the prime suspect. Haru returns to the hotel the next day, where he receives guidance from his sensei. When Haru locates Tanley's mansion, he finds Sally and discovers her real name is Alison Page. Alison informs him that Tanley murdered her sister, and she is dating Tanley with a fake name to get evidence. Haru discovers that Tanley will hire an ink specialist, Chet Walters, to help counterfeit money. His investigation is cut short when a rival gang attempts to whack Tanley, and Haru and Allison flee, breaking her cover. Haru and Allison visit Chet's office where they incapacitate him and drug him into revealing the truth about his dealings with Tanley. Haru disguises himself as Walters and infiltrates Tanley's warehouse. His identity is exposed after he fails to counterfeit the money properly, and Tanley captures him. While Tanley obtains the other half of the plates from the rival gang, Alison rescues Haru, only to be kidnapped by Tanley. Haru is then surrounded by the Los Angeles police during which Gobei used a smoke bomb to cover Haru's escape, being arrested himself, and later escaping. Haru enlists Joey's help to find Tanley's warehouse to rescue Alison. Gobei intervenes without Haru's knowledge and leads them back to the warehouse.

Haru is overwhelmed by Tanley's guards. Gobei reveals himself to Haru and distracts the guards, allowing Haru to rescue Alison. Haru uses a forklift to smash into the room, where Tanley locked Alison up with a bomb. Trying to defuse the bomb, Haru accidentally resets it for five minutes and decides to help Gobei and suddenly snaps, demonstrating impressive martial arts moves that stun Gobei. Haru saves Gobei and defeats several guards. Haru and Gobei are left facing Nobu and two guards. Joey crashes through a window and knocks himself and one of the guards unconscious. Haru and Gobei defeat Nobu and the remaining guard and then fight Tanley. Haru accidentally knocks Gobei unconscious with a sheave and forces Tanley to flee. Haru shoots a harpoon mounted on a cart through the room and into the back of a truck in which Tanley is escaping. The harpoon drags the bomb into Tanley's truck and explodes. Haru rescues Alison, while Tanley and his hitmen are arrested by Los Angeles police. Joey is interviewed by a news reporter and claims to be "The Great Black Ninja".

Haru returns to Japan, where he tells his sensei that he will be living in Beverly Hills with Alison. As Haru and Alison depart for Beverly Hills, a grappling hook falls from the bus and hooks Gobei's wheelchair, causing him to be thrown into the Pacific Ocean. As the film comes to an end, Haru shouts an apology to Gobei.

== Cast ==
- Chris Farley as Haru, an orphaned clumsy Caucasian male who was raised at a Japanese monastery to be trained in Ninjitsu
  - Jason Davis as Young Haru
- Nicollette Sheridan as Alison Page / Sally Jones, a femme from Beverly Hills who was determined to prove Tanley killed her sister
- Robin Shou as Gobei, Haru's foster brother who is a dedicated ninja
- Nathaniel Parker as Martin Tanley, a counterfeiter and crime boss running the Yakuza in LA
- Soon-Tek Oh as Sensei, the dojo master whom Haru and Gobei are training under
- Chris Rock as Joey Washington, a young bellhop who wants to be a ninja
- Keith Cooke Hirabayashi as Nobu, Tanley's personal bodyguard
- William Sasso as Chet Walters, a counterfeiter Tanley plans to hire
- François Chau as Izumo
- Jason Tobin as Busboy
- John P. Farley as Policeman
- Kevin Farley as Policeman
- Billy Connolly as Japanese Antique Shop Proprietor
- Patrick Breen as Desk Manager
- Steve Terada as Martial Artist

== Production ==
Dana Carvey was originally attached to play Haru back in 1990.

== Box office ==
In its opening weekend, the film topped the North American box office with $12,220,920. It went on to gross $31,480,418 in North America and $6,393,685 in other territories, for a total of $37,874,103 grossed worldwide.

== Reception ==
Beverly Hills Ninja received generally negative reviews. On Rotten Tomatoes the film has an approval rating of 16% from 31 reviews. The site's consensus states: "Far from silent, but comedically deadly, Beverly Hills Ninja proves painfully unfunny." On Metacritic it has a score of 27 out of 100 based on reviews from 11 critics. Audiences surveyed by CinemaScore gave the film a grade B+ on scale of A to F.

James Berardinelli panned the film, stating that "Beverly Hills Ninja is essentially a one-joke film. That joke has to do with Chris Farley [...], who plays one of the clumsiest men on Earth, crashing into objects or having things fall on his head" and concluded that it "isn't just juvenile, it's lackluster and unfunny."

Bruce Fretts of Entertainment Weekly also criticized the film, complaining it had "...a yawner plot about Farley busting up a yen counterfeiting ring" and that "when the writers run out of ideas, they simply have Farley walk into a lamppost, or cop from old SNL skits."

A favorable review came from Mick LaSalle of the San Francisco Chronicle who wrote that it is "not the kind of picture that gets respect from New York critics, but it's funny. [...] This is a movie in which the audience knows half the gags in advance, but thanks to director Dennis Dugan's timing and Farley's execution, the audience doesn't just laugh anyway, but laughs harder... he's too good, too funny and too in control of his out-of-controlness to be a mere buffoon." Leonard Klady of Variety magazine wrote: "This sweet saga of an underachiever who makes good is surprisingly appealing and sure to broaden the portly comic's fan base."

In the years since its release, Christian Bale has cited the film as one of his all time favorites.

== Soundtrack ==
Beverly Hills Ninja

Soundtrack album to Beverly Hills Ninja
- Released: January 14, 1997
- Genre: Soundtrack
- Length: 34:14
- Label: EMI Records

Professional ratings
Review scores
Source	Rating
Allmusic	2/5 stars

Track listing

1. "You're a Ninja?..." – Chris Farley, Chris Rock
2. "Kung Fu Fighting" – Patti Rothberg
3. "One Way or Another" – Blondie
4. "...We Are in Danger..." – Chris Farley, Nathaniel Parker
5. "Tsugihagi Boogie Woogie" – Ulfuls
6. "Low Rider" – War
7. "The blackness of my belt..." – Chris Farley, Chris Rock
8. "Tarzan Boy" – Baltimora
9. "...my identity must remain mysterious..." – Chris Farley, Curtis Blanck
10. "Turning Japanese" – The Hazies
11. "You're the big, fat Ninja, aren't you?" – Chris Farley, Nathaniel Parker
12. "Kung Fu Fighting" – Carl Douglas
13. "I'm Too Sexy" – Right Said Fred
14. "...close to the temple, not inside" – Chris Farley, Nicollette Sheridan
15. "I Think We're Alone Now" (Japanese version) – Lene Lovich
16. "Finally Got It" – Little John
17. "...Yes, I guess I did" – Chris Farley, Soon-Tek Oh
18. "The End" – George Clinton & Buckethead
