= Liang Heng =

Chinese writer and scholar (born 1954)

- Born: 1954 (age 71–72); Changsha, Hunan Province, China
- Occupation: Author
- Notable work: Son of the Revolution, After the Nightmare

Liang Heng (simplified Chinese: 梁恒; traditional Chinese: 梁恆; pinyin: Liáng Héng) (born 1954) is a Chinese-American writer and scholar. He co-authored Son of the Revolution, a memoir of growing up during the tumultuous Cultural Revolution and After the Nightmare, another first-person account of China, this time describing a return visit during the period of reform and opening up in the 1980s.

== Life ==
As narrated in his memoirs, Liang Heng was born in Changsha, Hunan Province. He was the only son born to a reporter and a police bureaucrat. He and his two elder sisters seemed assured a place in China's communist system - their parents were well placed, and all were fervent supporters of Mao Zedong. The Liangs' fortunes turned after the Hundred Flowers Campaign, in which loyal communists were encouraged to find faults in the existing regime; accordingly, Liang's mother offered some mild criticism. This mass movement was soon replaced with another, an "anti-rightist" campaign that targeted those who were seen as deviating from the party line. Liang Heng's mother, singled out because she had criticized the party in compliance with the Hundred Flowers Campaign, was sent to a re-education camp. Throughout the Cultural Revolution the family's lives continued to be shaped by the nation's revolutionary fervor. Liang's father reluctantly divorced his now disgraced wife in order to spare his family the "black mark" of having a "rightist" mother. Eventually, Liang's father was labeled a counter-revolutionary intellectual and publicly humiliated, and Liang Heng suffered social degradation as a "stinking intellectual's son." In Son of the Revolution, Liang chronicles his participation in a Changsha street gang, his time sent to live in the remote countryside, and his experience as a child member of the Red Guard.

Eventually, the years of violent turmoil subsided. Liang became a factory worker and then a star basketball player, navigating the "back door" system of bribery in hopes of gaining admission to university. Once China signaled that it would reopen university entry examinations, Liang Heng earned entry into the Hunan Teachers' College in Changsha. There he met Judith Shapiro, an American teacher, one of the early "foreign experts" admitted to China after several decades during which few foreigners were permitted to interact with Chinese citizens. After prolonged efforts, which ultimately involved the intervention of Deng Xiaoping, Liang and Shapiro were married. Liang emigrated with his wife to the United States in the early 1980s. Later that decade, at the invitation of government reformers, the couple returned to China to observe the ongoing social changes (this return visit is the subject of "After the Nightmare," co-authored by Liang and Shapiro).

Liang Heng was portrayed by Robin Shou in the 1990 TV drama film Forbidden Nights. The movie was based on a New York Times article by Judith Shapiro, "The Rocky Course of Love in China," describing her relationship with Liang Heng in Changsha.

In 1991 Liang and Shapiro divorced.

Liang Heng's archive, including manuscripts, photos and sound recordings, is held at the Hoover Institution Archives at Stanford University.

== Bibliography ==
All co-authored with Judith Shapiro

- Son of the Revolution. Vintage Books USA. 1983. ISBN 978-5-550-99986-8.
- Cold Winds, Warm Winds: Intellectual Life in China Today. Wesleyan University Press. 1986. ISBN 978-0819561688.
- After the Nightmare. Knopf USA. 1987. ISBN 978-0394551531.
