= Up Against the Wall =

Up Against the Wall may refer to:

- "Up Against the Wall", a song on Tom Robinson Band's 1978 album Power in the Darkness
- "Up Against the Wall", a song on Boys Like Girls' 2006 self-titled debut album
- Up Against the Wall Motherfucker, 1960s New York-based anarchist affinity group
- "Up Against the Wall, Redneck Mother", a song by Ray Wylie Hubbard, made famous by Jerry Jeff Walker's 1973 recording
- "Up Against the Wall", a song on The Whitlam's 1997 album Eternal Nightcap
- "Up Against the Wall", a song on Patti Rothberg's album Between the 1 and the 9
