= Suckpump =

SuckPump

Studio album by Bile
- Released: 9 August 1994
- Recorded: Music Palace, Strong Island, New York
- Genre: Industrial metal
- Length: 39:34
- Label: Energy Records
- Producer: Slave a.k.a. David Stagnari, Void, and Krztoff

Bile chronology
SuckPump (1994)	Teknowhore (1996)

Professional ratings
Review scores
Source	Rating
AllMusic	2.5/5 stars
The Encyclopedia of Popular Music	4/5 stars

SuckPump is the first album by New York industrial band Bile, released in 1994. The album was released on the now-defunct Energy Records. Bile re-released the album in 2003 alongside their out-of-print second release, Teknowhore, as a digipak titled Frankenhole.

SuckPump was written and recorded by Chris 'Krztoff' Liggio and produced and engineered by David 'Slave' Stagnari, Robert 'Void' Caprio, and Krztoff (reported on the album as Kristoff).

"I Reject" was part of the soundtrack of the 1995 film adaptation of Mortal Kombat.

== Critical reception ==
The Encyclopedia of Popular Music gave the album 4 stars (out of 5) and called it a "classic." The Washington Post wrote that the songs "are formed around ordinary dance tracks, then fed through a meat grinder of distorted vocals and crushing guitars, resulting in tunes that would be almost catchy but for the throbbing instrumental attack."

== Track listing ==
All songs written by Chris Liggio except "Burnt" by Liggio and Eric Meneses

1. "Head" - 5:26
2. "Burnt" - 3:56
3. "Ura Fucking Loser" - 5:16
4. "I Reject" - 2:56
5. "Feeling Like Shit" - 4.13
6. "Get Out" - 4:21
7. "Suckpump" - 9:01
8. "Get Out (Radio Edit)" - 4.25

== Credits ==
Live band members

- Krztoff (Chris Liggio) - vocals
- Eric Roi (Eric Meneses) - vocals
- Archie A.K. - vocals
- Brett (Brett Pirozzi) - bass guitar
- Jeff X. - guitars
- R.H. Bear (Rick Boeckel) - keyboards
- Omen (Damion Troy) - cybercussion
- Sin-D - sex
- Mr. and Mrs. Clown
- Bobabuse (Bob Noble) - beatings
- Mclusky - lights

Production

- Produced and engineered by Slave a.k.a. David Stagnari, Void, and Krztoff
- Programming and additional sounds by Slave a.k.a. David Stagnari
- Tape edited by Void
- Recorded at Music Palace, Strong Island, N.Y.
- Mastered by Howie Weinberg at Masterdisk
- Management - Ramsey Jabbar for Aggression Inc.
- Design - Mary Jane Leonti Design Group
- Illustration - Gina Volpe
