= Mortal Kombat: The Album =

Soundtrack album by The Immortals
- Released: May 31, 1994
- Recorded: 1993–1994
- Length: 37:00
- Label: Virgin
- Producer: Olivier Adams

Professional ratings
Review scores
Source	Rating
AllMusic	2/5 stars

Mortal Kombat: The Album is a soundtrack album by The Immortals (Maurice "Praga Khan" Engelen and Olivier Adams), released in 1994 to accompany the home versions of the video game Mortal Kombat. Television commercials for the home versions included a brief plug for the album at the end. The single Mortal Kombat (Techno-Syndrome) was released in 1993.

== Background and recording ==
Engelen and Adams were invited by Midway Games following the success of their techno/industrial/new beat band Lords of Acid, and were then provided with a copy of the game, detailed information about the various characters, and a library of sound effects to sample, being given one month to compose an album in-between tours of their project. The album featured a techno song for each of the 7 playable characters, as well as boss Goro, along with two additional tracks. One of those, "Hypnotic House (Mortal Kombat)" was used as an intro in the Mortal Kombat Sega CD.

The other, "Mortal Kombat (Techno Syndrome)", was the only solo effort, as Engelen had left for a meeting of his record label, leaving Adams to do the song by himself on his Atari ST computer. "Techno Syndrome", with its signature scream of "Mortal Kombat!"—sampled from the "Mortal Monday" commercial advertising the home console version of the game, with the scream performed by actor Kyle Wyatt—has subsequently become famous as "the Mortal Kombat theme song" because of its use in the 1995 film, and remixed versions of the song continue to be associated with the Mortal Kombat franchise. The soundtrack reached number 10 on the Billboard 200 charts. Jonathan Oyama of VentureBeat claimed that "Techno Syndrome" is based on "Twilight Zone" by 2 Unlimited. However, Adams and Engelen assert that any similarities between the two songs were coincidental, and no legal action was ever pursued.

"Techno Syndrome" is also a hidden song featured in the Sega CD version of Mortal Kombat when one chooses to enter the "soundtrack" mode at the Sega CD intro screen. It can also be accessed by putting the CD in a CD player and selecting track 17. The album peaked at #16 on the Billboard Heatseekers in the United States.

== Track listing ==
All tracks are written by Maurice Engelen and Olivier Adams, except where noted.

No.	Title	Writer(s)	Length
1.	"Johnny Cage (Prepare Yourself)"		3:39
2.	"Kano (Use Your Might)"		3:45
3.	"Sub-Zero (Chinese Ninja Warrior)"		3:49
4.	"Liu Kang (Born In China)"		4:05
5.	"Techno Syndrome (Mortal Kombat)"	Olivier Adams	3:22
6.	"Scorpion (Lost Soul Bent On Revenge)"		3:48
7.	"Sonya (Go Go Go)"		3:33
8.	"Rayden (Eternal Life)"		3:46
9.	"Goro (The Outworld Prince)"		3:33
10.	"Hypnotic House (Mortal Kombat)"		3:40

== Other renditions ==
"Utah Saints Take on the Theme from Mortal Kombat" was a remix by the Utah Saints that was a track on the 1995 soundtrack album.

In 2011, Funk You Bits released on YouTube "Funk do Mortal Kombat", a remix from "Techno Syndrome" in funk carioca style. The song became popular amongst Brazilians.

Benjamin Wallfisch composed "Techno Syndrome 2021" as the theme song for the reboot film. It peaked at number 5 on the Billboard Dance/Electronic Digital Song Sales and number 15 on the Hot Dance/Electronic Songs chart.

A cover of "Techno Syndrome" by Anamanaguchi is used in the 2023 Netflix anime series Scott Pilgrim Takes Off, with new vocals by Wyatt naming Scott Pilgrim characters instead of those from the game, and the "Mortal Kombat!" scream replaced by "Scott Pilgrim Takes Off!". The version was released as a single from the series' soundtrack album on January 19, 2024.
