= Street Fighter: The Legend of Chun-Li =

- Theatrical release poster
- Directed by: Andrzej Bartkowiak
- Written by: Justin Marks
- Based on: Street Fighter by Capcom
- Produced by: Patrick Aiello; Ashok Amritraj
- Starring: Kristin Kreuk; Chris Klein; Neal McDonough; Robin Shou; Moon Bloodgood; Josie Ho; Taboo; Michael Clarke Duncan
- Cinematography: Geoff Boyle
- Edited by: Derek Brechin; Niven Howie
- Music by: Stephen Endelman
- Production companies: Hyde Park Entertainment; Capcom; Adlabs Films
- Distributed by: 20th Century Fox
- Release date: February 27, 2009
- Running time: 96 minutes
- Country: United States
- Language: English
- Budget: $50 million
- Box office: $12.8 million

Street Fighter: The Legend of Chun-Li is a 2009 American martial arts action film based upon the Street Fighter video game series produced by Capcom. Directed by Andrzej Bartkowiak from a screenplay written by Justin Marks, the film serves as a non-canonical spin-off and theatrical tie-in to Street Fighter IV (2008) and is the second live-action adaptation in the series following the 1994 film. The story follows the quest of Street Fighter character Chun-Li, played by Kristin Kreuk, before the events of the original Street Fighter. The film co-stars Neal McDonough as M. Bison, Chris Klein as Charlie Nash, Michael Clarke Duncan as Balrog, and Black Eyed Peas member Taboo as Vega.

Produced by Capcom and Hyde Park Entertainment, with Keiji Inafune (better known for his work on the Mega Man franchise) as an executive producer, The Legend of Chun-Li was released on February 27, 2009, by 20th Century Fox, and became a critical and commercial failure. A reboot was released by Paramount Pictures and Legendary Entertainment on October 16, 2026.

== Plot ==
Chun-Li moves from San Francisco to Hong Kong with her family and begins intensive training in wushu under the tutelage of her father, businessman Xiang. The criminal organization Shadaloo targets Xiang, abducting him right in front of Chun-Li. As an adult, she has forsaken her family's traditions, instead becoming a famous concert pianist. Shortly after her mother's death from terminal cancer, Chun-Li receives a mysterious scroll written in ancient Chinese. Meanwhile, at Shadaloo headquarters in Bangkok, the sadistic M. Bison usurps control of the organization from his fellow bosses with help from the masked assassin Vega.

The next day, Royal Thai Police detective Maya Sunee meets Interpol agent Charlie Nash when both are called to investigate the massacre of several crime syndicate families in Bangkok, with Nash determining Shadaloo perpetrated these crimes. In Hong Kong, an elderly woman translates Chun-Li's scroll and tells her to travel to Bangkok and find a man named Gen. Despite several days of wandering, she is unable to find him. A fight with local gangsters one night leaves her unconscious, and Gen appears and takes her to his home. Gen tells Chun-Li that he was once a comrade of Bison and knows how to find her father, but that in exchange, she must complete her martial arts training with him. Chun-Li also learns about Bison and his plan to operate Shadaloo publicly. Holding the families of property owners hostage, he forces them to sign their land over to him. While spying on Bison's henchman Balrog, Chun-Li overhears a property owner being asked to hand over the rights to a docking harbor, allowing the shipment of the "White Rose".

Later that night, Chun-Li confronts Cantana, one of Bison's secretaries, in a nightclub. She obtains information on the location of the White Rose before escaping from Shadaloo's thugs and Nash and Maya. As a result of this incident, Cantana is later murdered by Bison. During lunch, Gen reveals more of Bison's past; he was born in Bangkok to Irish missionaries but was abandoned as an infant, grew up an orphan, and lived his life as a thief. He killed his pregnant wife and transferred his conscience to their prematurely born daughter. Shadaloo troops attack Gen, and Balrog blows up his house. Chun-Li is later attacked by Vega, whom she defeats and leaves hanging by the side of a building.

Chun-Li interrogates a harbor employee who tells her the arrival time of the White Rose. She returns to the shipping yard that night but is captured by Bison and his soldiers. Tied up and kidnapped, she is reunited with Xiang, whom Bison immediately murders. After Bison and Balrog leave the house, Chun-Li beats up the guards and escapes, during which she is shot in the arm while trying to protect a child. Angered Thai locals then attack Bison's henchmen. Chun-Li reunites with Gen, who heals her wounds and continues with her training.

After being taken off the assignment, Nash is asked by Chun-Li to back her up in taking down Bison. Aided by Maya and her SWAT team, they arrive at the shipping yard and shoot out with Shadaloo forces. Gen enters a ship and faces off Balrog, ultimately killing him. Meanwhile, Bison flees the scene after taking a Russian-speaking girl from that ship. She turns out to be his daughter, Rose. Chun-Li and the officers arrive at Bison's headquarters. The policemen take Rose out to safety while Chun-Li and Gen face Bison. During that battle, Chun-Li charges up a Kikoken, shoots it at him, and knocks him off before she breaks his neck with her legs.

Chun-Li returns to her home in Hong Kong and settles down, and then Gen pays her a visit. He shows her a newspaper advert for an upcoming Street Fighter tournament and tells her that a fighter named Ryu might be a recruit for their cause. She declines the offer, telling him she is home for now.

== Cast ==
- Kristin Kreuk as Chun-Li
  - Katherine Pemberton as young Chun-Li
- Neal McDonough as M. Bison
  - Brendan Miller as young Bison
- Chris Klein as Interpol Agent Charlie Nash
- Michael Clarke Duncan as Balrog
- Moon Bloodgood as Detective Maya "Crimson Viper" Sunee
- Taboo as Vega
- Robin Shou as Gen
- Edmund Chen as Huang Xiang, Chun-Li's father
- Josie Ho as Cantana
- Elizaveta Kiryukhina as Rose
- Cheng Pei-pei as Zhilan
- Krystal Vee as Lucy

== Production ==
=== Development and writing ===
In 2006, Hyde Park Entertainment and Capcom announced their intention to produce a film adaptation of the game series in a joint venture distributed by 20th Century Fox, with the storyline to focus on a Street Fighter origin story starting with one of its characters Chun-Li with screenwriter Justin Marks to write a script for the adaptation. In 2007, Hyde Park has chosen Andrzej Bartkowiak to helm as film director. That same year, it was announced that Kristin Kreuk was cast as Chun-Li.

=== Casting ===
In 2008, Michael Clarke Duncan, Chris Klein, Taboo, Rick Yune and Neal McDonough were cast as characters Balrog, Charlie Nash, Vega, Gen and M. Bison with Moon Bloodgood, Edmund Chen, Josie Ho and Cheng Pei-pei were also cast in roles as well. In the interview with MTV, Jean-Claude Van Damme who played Guile in the 1994 film revealed that he was offered to reprise his role but turned down the movie. Before shooting began Yune left the film for unknown reasons but was replaced by Robin Shou, who played Liu Kang, the lead character in the Mortal Kombat films as Gen. Dion Lam and Jonathan Eusebio served as the film's fight choreographers.

=== Filming ===
Filming took place between March and April 2008. Shooting locations included Hong Kong, China; Bangkok, Thailand; Vancouver, Canada; and Reno, Nevada and Herlong, California, United States.

== Release ==
=== Theatrical ===
Originally it was slated to be released to theatres sometime in the Fall of 2008, but due to production delays and the ongoing writers strike at the time, the film was released in theatres in the United States on February 27, 2009. In Australia, the film did not receive a theatrical release, but a straight-to-DVD release instead on January 14, 2010.

=== Home media ===
The film was released on home media on DVD and Blu-ray on June 30, 2009. with an Unrated/PG-13 version. The special First Run release included a bonus DVD of the Udon Street Fighter Comic Series: "Round One FIGHT."

The film performed at #9 on the American DVD sales chart, selling 92,830 units in the first weekend. About 258,000 DVD units have been sold so far in the United States, bringing in revenue of $4.7m. This figure does not include DVD rentals/Blu-ray sales.

== Reception ==
=== Box office ===
The film opened theatrically on its opening weekend on February 27, 2009, alongside Jonas Brothers: The 3D Concert Experience and Madea Goes to Jail (the latter on its second weekend). The film opened at #9 on its opening weekend at over $1.5 million. The film flopped at the box office, grossing $12.8 million worldwide against its $50 million budget.

=== Critical response ===
Street Fighter: The Legend of Chun-Li was not pre-screened for critics. On the review aggregator website Rotten Tomatoes, 3% of 59 critics' reviews are positive, with an average rating of 2.3/10. The website's consensus reads: "The combination of a shallow plot and miscast performers renders Street Fighter: The Legend of Chun Li a perfectly forgettable video game adaptation." It was ranked 44th in Rotten Tomatoes' 100 worst reviewed films of the 2000s. Metacritic, which uses a weighted average, assigned the film a score of 17 out of 100, based on 11 critics, indicating "overwhelming dislike".

Film historian Leonard Maltin seemed to agree, stating that "The 1994 picture was one of the worst movies ever inspired by a video game; even Jean-Claude Van Damme fans couldn't rationalize this turkey, which should have been titled Four Hundred Funerals and No Sex. Yet this pointless and inept action vehicle makes its predecessor seem like Gone with the Wind...Hopelessly contrived, with lamely-choreographed fight sequences; highlight is Chris Klein's cry of 'Bomb! Get out, now!' Our sentiments exactly."

Among the film's more positive reviews, Rob Nelson of Variety wrote: "Neither the best nor the worst of movies derived from video games, Street Fighter: The Legend of Chun-Li at least gives action fans plenty to ogle besides the titular heroine (Kristin Kreuk)." Jeannette Catsoulis of The New York Times wrote that the film was "reveling in the vivid Bangkok locations, Geoff Boyle's photography is crisp and bright, and Dion Lam's action choreography unusually witty."

Negative reviews focused on the screenplay and fight scenes. Frank Scheck of The Hollywood Reporter wrote that "other than a few reasonably well-staged fight sequences, the proceedings are dull and visually uninspired. Justin Marks' solemn screenplay lacks any trace of wit."Jeremy Wheeler of TV Guide wrote: "Fight scenes, while admirable for shaking off the shaky-cam aesthetic of their big-screen brethren, neither inspire nor find a good balance between martial arts and FX-laden power punches." Jim Vejvoda of IGN gave the film 1.5 stars out of 5, writing: "There's better staged and more enjoyable brawls between Peter and The Chicken on Family Guy." Ryan Davis of Giant Bomb described it as "a re-envisioning [of the source material] by people who can't see."

== See also ==
- List of films based on video games
