= Red Trousers – The Life of the Hong Kong Stuntmen =

Red Trousers: The Life of the Hong Kong Stuntmen
- Directed by: Robin Shou
- Written by: Robin Shou
- Produced by: Robin Shou
- Starring: Robin Shou; Beatrice Chia; Keith Cooke; Hakim Alston; Craig Reid
- Music by: Ezra Gold; Nathan Wang
- Distributed by: Tai Seng
- Release dates: 5 April 2003 (Newport Beach International Film Festival); 5 March 2004
- Running time: 96 minutes
- Countries: United States; Hong Kong
- Language: English; Cantonese; Mandarin; Spanish

Red Trousers: The Life of the Hong Kong Stuntmen (Chinese: 紅褲子) is a documentary film directed by Robin Shou.

== Plot ==
This documentary from Robin Shou—who also hosts and participates in the film—takes a behind-the-scenes glance inside the stunt industry of Hong Kong, which is known for being riskier and less trick-oriented than its American counterpart. In addition to archival and interview footage featuring some of the industry's most prominent stuntmen, Red Trousers - The Life of Hong Kong Stuntmen incorporates scenes from adventure short action film Lost Time (2001) in an effort to illustrate how stuntmen prepare for and ultimately perform in modern martial arts films.

== Cast ==
- Seb H - Choreographer/How to Wear Tight Red Trousers Consultant/Himself
- Robin Shou - Evan/Narrator/Himself
- Beatrice Chia – Silver
- Keith Cooke - Kermuran (as Keith Cooke Hirabayashi)
- Hakim Alston - Eyemarder
- Craig Reid - Jia Fei (as Craig D. Reid)
- Buffulo - Computer virus thug/Zu's zombie fighter
- Mindy Dhanjal - Zu Yao Her
- Duck - Forest Devil/Himself
- Kok Siu Hang - Flying machine body guard/forest devil/himself
- Sammo Hung Kam-Bo - Himself (as Sammo Hung)
- Lueng Shing Hung - Zu's Zombie Fighter
- Kam Loi Kwan - Flying machine body guard/computer virus thug/forest devil/zu's zombie fighter/himself
- Alice Lee - Nurse
- Justin Fletcher - John Don
- Mike Leeder - Mr. Goa
- Chia-Liang Liu - Himself (as Lau Kar-Leung Sifu)
- Leung Chi Ming - Forest Devil
- Monique Marie Ozimkowshi - Dominatri
- Jude Poyer - Flying machine body guard/himself
- Ng Wing Sum - Flying machine body guard/computer virus thug/zu's zombie fighter
- Ridley Tsui - Himself
- Chi Man Wong - Computer virus thug/forest devil/zu's zombie fighter/himself

== Awards ==
- Newport Beach Film Festival 2003
  - Outstanding Achievement in Filmmaking Award

== Media ==
=== DVD release ===
- Red Trousers – The Life of the Hong Kong Stuntmen (2005)
- Red Trousers – The Life of the Hong Kong Stuntmen Collector's Edition (2-Disc-Set) (2005)
