= Mortal Kombat (1995 soundtrack) =

Mortal Kombat: Original Motion Picture Soundtrack

Soundtrack album by Various artists
- Released: August 15, 1995
- Genres: EDM; electronica; techno; industrial rock; industrial metal; death metal; groove metal
- Length: 68:28
- Label: TVT

Professional ratings
Review scores
Source	Rating
Allmusic	3/5 stars

Mortal Kombat: Original Motion Picture Soundtrack is the compilation album that accompanied the 1995 film Mortal Kombat. Three songs by Stabbing Westward were included in the movie, but were omitted from the soundtrack: "Lost", "Lies" and "Can't Happen Here", all of which appear on the album Ungod. Metal vocalist Burton C. Bell is the only artist on the album to appear twice; once with his primary band Fear Factory, and again with side-project GZR. The album features primarily electronic dance music (EDM) along with rock music.

== Reception ==
Mortal Kombat was nominated for the Motion Picture Sound Editors, USA Golden Reel Award. It won the BMI Film & TV Awards BMI Film Music Award. The soundtrack went Platinum in less than a year reaching No. 10 on the Billboard 200, and was included in the 2011 Guinness World Records Gamer's Edition as the "most successful video game spin-off soundtrack album". It was the first electronic dance music (EDM) record to receive a Platinum certification in the United States. Its popularity inspired the album Mortal Kombat: More Kombat.

== Track listing ==
Mortal Kombat
No.	Title	Artist	Length
1.	"A Taste of Things to Come"	George S. Clinton	0:49
2.	"Goodbye (Demo Version)"	Gravity Kills	3:10
3.	"Juke-Joint Jezebel (Giorgio Moroder Metropolis Mix)"	KMFDM	5:17
4.	"Unlearn (Josh Wink's Live Mix)"	Psykosonik	4:51
5.	"Control (Juno Reactor Instrumental)"	Traci Lords	6:26
6.	"Halcyon + On + On"	Orbital	9:24
7.	"Utah Saints Take on The Theme from Mortal Kombat"	Utah Saints	3:00
8.	"The Invisible"	GZR	3:43
9.	"Zero Signal"	Fear Factory	5:57
10.	"Burn"	Sister Machine Gun	4:45
11.	"Blood & Fire (Out of the Ashes Mix)"	Type O Negative	4:28
12.	"I Reject"	Bile	2:48
13.	"Twist the Knife (Slowly)"	Napalm Death	2:52
14.	"What U See/We All Bleed Red"	Mutha's Day Out	4:11
15.	"Techno Syndrome (Mortal Kombat)"	The Immortals	3:24
16.	"Goro Vs. Art"	George S. Clinton feat. Buckethead	2:59
17.	"Demon Warriors/Final Kombat"	George S. Clinton	3:49

== Charts ==
=== Weekly charts ===
Chart (1995–1996)	Peak position
Australian Albums (ARIA)	11
German Albums (Offizielle Top 100)	49
Hungarian Albums (MAHASZ)	17
New Zealand Albums (RMNZ)	6
US Billboard 200	10

=== Year-end charts ===
Chart (1995)	Position
US Billboard 200	145

== Certifications ==
Region	Certification	Certified units/sales
Canada (Music Canada)	Platinum	100,000^{^}
United States (RIAA)	Platinum	1,000,000^{^}
^{^} Shipments figures based on certification alone.
