= Patti Rothberg =

American singer-songwriter

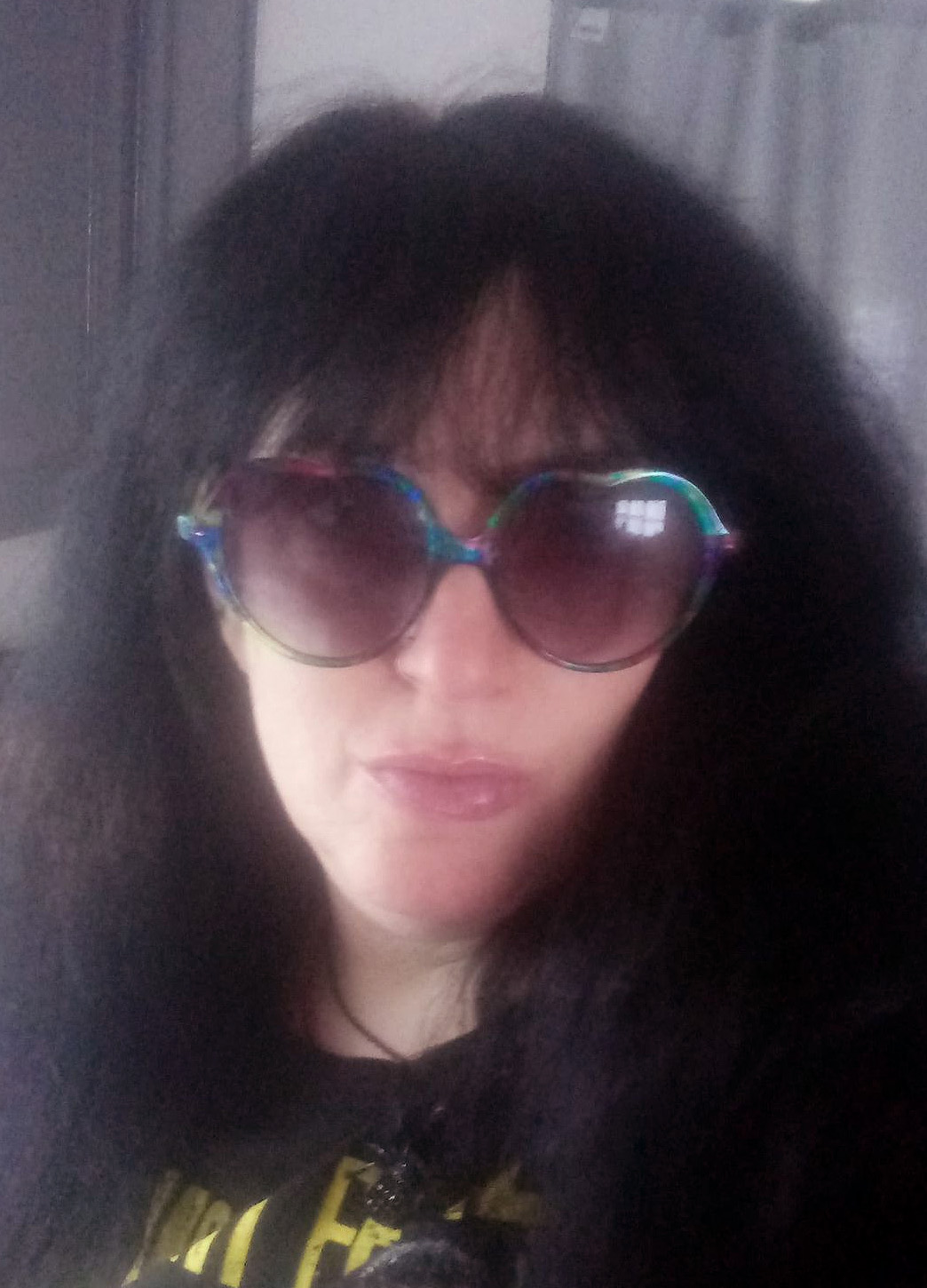
- Patti Rothberg Oct, 2020

Background information
- Born: Patricia Lynne Rothberg; May 4, 1972 (age 54); New York City
- Genres: Pop, rock
- Occupations: Singer, songwriter
- Years active: 1993–present
- Labels: EMI, Cropduster, Rothberg Carey Records
- Website: pattirothberg.wordpress.com

Patricia Lynne "Patti" Rothberg (born May 4, 1972) is a singer-songwriter and painter.

Born in New York City, Rothberg grew up in Scarsdale, New York.

Rothberg played all the guitar and bass parts on her debut album, Between the 1 and the 9, which was released on April 2, 1996. The first single, "Inside", reached number 25 on the Billboard magazine Alternative chart. With her band Rothberg toured extensively supporting Chris Isaak, The Wallflowers, Garbage, Midnight Oil and Paul Westerberg; making appearances on high-profile TV shows like The Tonight Show with Jay Leno, Late Night With David Letterman and Oprah. In February 1997, Rothberg toured Europe as support to The Black Crowes.

During this time, two of Rothberg's songs appeared in film: a cover of "Kung Fu Fighting" in Beverly Hills Ninja (1997) and "Inside" in The Misadventures of Margaret (1998).

Rothberg's third album, Double Standards, was released by indie label Megaforce on May 13, 2008. The release show was at the Blender Theater in New York City on May 22, 2008.

== Discography ==
=== Studio albums ===
- Between the 1 and the 9 (1996) – UK No. 83
- Candelabra Cadabra (2001)
- Double Standards (2008)
- Overnight Sensation (2011)
- Black Widow (2013)
- Ulterior Motives (2016)
- Ephemeral (2017)
- Dragon Meets Phoenix (with Sean Altman) (2018)
- Behind Bars (2019)
- Douche (2021)
- Pizza Box (2021)

=== Live albums ===
- 1 & 9 Acoustic 1996 (Live) (2021)

=== Singles/EPs ===
| Year | Song | Peak chart positions | | | | Album |
| Year | Song | US Alt | US Radio | AUS | UK | Album |
|---|---|---|---|---|---|---|
| 1996 | "Inside" | 25 | 71 | 108 | 78 | Between the 1 and the 9 |
| 1996 | "Remembering Tonight" | — | — | — | — | Between the 1 and the 9 |
| 1997 | "Kung Fu Fighting" | — | — | — | — | Beverly Hills Ninja; Motion Picture Soundtrack |
| 1997 | "Treat Me Like Dirt" | — | — | — | — | Between the 1 and the 9 |
| 1997 | "Looking for a Girl" | — | — | — | — | Between the 1 and the 9 |
| 2000 | "For a Boy" | — | — | — | — | single only |
| 2001 | "Nothing I Can Say" | — | — | — | — | Candelabra Cadabra |
| 2001 | "You Killed My Time" | — | — | — | — | Candelabra Cadabra |
| 2001 | "Candelabra Cadabra" | — | — | — | — | Candelabra Cadabra |
| 2002 | "Snow Is My Downfall" | — | — | — | — | EP only |
| 2006 | "Hard Times" | — | — | — | — | Vol 1 - Artists for Gulf; Coast Hurricane Relief |
| 2012 | "Make It Real" | — | — | — | — | Overnight Sensation |
| 2013 | "Black Widow" | — | — | — | — | Black Widow |
| 2015 | "Hollywood Ending" | — | — | — | — | Ulterior Motives |
| 2016 | "Brainwash" | — | — | — | — | Ulterior Motives |
| 2021 | "Bossa Me" | — | — | — | — | Douche |

=== Soundtracks ===
- "Kung-Fu Fighting (Non-LP)" (1997) [featured on Beverly Hills Ninja Soundtrack and CMJ New Music Volume 42]
- Anywhere - Original Soundtrack (2007) [7 of the 10 tracks]
