= Mortal Kombat (1995 film) =

1995 film by Paul Anderson

- Theatrical release poster
- Directed by: Paul Anderson
- Written by: Kevin Droney
- Based on: Mortal Kombat by: Ed Boon; John Tobias
- Produced by: Lawrence Kasanoff
- Starring: Linden Ashby; Cary-Hiroyuki Tagawa; Robin Shou; Bridgette Wilson; Talisa Soto; Christopher Lambert
- Cinematography: John R. Leonetti
- Edited by: Martin Hunter
- Music by: George S. Clinton
- Production company: Threshold Entertainment
- Distributed by: New Line Cinema
- Release date: August 18, 1995
- Running time: 101 minutes
- Country: United States
- Language: English
- Budget: $20 million
- Box office: $122.2 million

Mortal Kombat is a 1995 American martial arts fantasy film based on the video game franchise by Ed Boon and John Tobias. It is the first installment in the Mortal Kombat film series. It was directed by Paul Anderson and stars Linden Ashby, Cary-Hiroyuki Tagawa, Robin Shou, Bridgette Wilson, Talisa Soto, and Christopher Lambert. The film follows a group of heroes who participate in the eponymous tournament to protect Earth from being conquered by malevolent forces. Its story primarily adapts the original 1992 game, while also using elements from the game Mortal Kombat II (1993).

Development of a Mortal Kombat film adaptation began shortly after the release of Mortal Kombat II when independent producer Lawrence Kasanoff acquired the rights from Midway Games. Newcomer director Anderson was hired based on the strength of his debut Shopping, with a screenplay written by Kevin Droney. Filming took place primarily in Thailand, with fight sequences supervised by Shou and Pat E. Johnson.

Mortal Kombat was released by New Line Cinema in the United States on August 18, 1995. It received mixed reviews from critics, who praised the martial art sequences, atmosphere, and production values, but criticized the screenplay and toned-down violence from the games. Despite the mixed critical response, the film was well received by fans of the series. It was also a commercial success, grossing $122.2 million on a $20 million budget and becoming the highest-grossing film based on a video game at the time.

The film was followed by a 1997 sequel, Mortal Kombat Annihilation, along with two television series: the animated sequel Mortal Kombat: Defenders of the Realm (1996) and the live-action prequel Mortal Kombat: Conquest (1998–1999). The follow-ups were unable to match the original film's success and the series was rebooted with a 2021 film.

== Plot ==
Mortal Kombat is a martial arts tournament that is held once every generation between representatives of the realms of Earth and the otherworldly dimension of Outworld. If Outworld achieves ten consecutive victories, the Outworld Emperor will invade and conquer the Earthrealm. They have already won nine times. Shaolin monk Liu Kang, movie star Johnny Cage and Special Forces officer Sonya Blade are chosen by Raiden, the god of thunder and defender of Earthrealm, to prevent Outworld from winning their tenth straight tournament. Kang seeks revenge against the tournament host Shang Tsung for killing his brother Chan and taking his soul; Sonya is lured onto the ship headed for Shang Tsung's island by crime boss Kano, who murdered her partner; Johnny seeks to debunk media claims that his martial arts skills are faked.

Tsung orders the creature Reptile to prevent Princess Kitana, the Emperor's adopted daughter, from allying with the Earth warriors. Kang, Johnny and Sonya advance to the final rounds of the tournament, with Sonya killing Kano, Johnny killing Scorpion, and Liu defeating Kitana (who uses their match to give him advice on how to defeat Sub-Zero) and killing Sub-Zero.

One of Johnny's peers, Art Lean, is defeated by the reigning tournament champion, Prince Goro, and has his soul taken by Shang Tsung. Hoping to protect Kang and Sonya, Johnny challenges Goro.

Johnny uses guile and the element of surprise to defeat Goro. Now desperate, Tsung takes Sonya hostage and takes her to Outworld. Knowing that his powers are ineffective there, Rayden sends Kang and Johnny into Outworld to rescue Sonya and challenge Tsung. In Outworld, Kang is attacked by Reptile but gains the upper hand and kills him. Kitana meets up with Johnny and Kang. She reveals to them that Outworld was a beautiful and peaceful place until the Emperor came from a third realm and brought Outworld to ruin after winning ten consecutive Mortal Kombat tournaments there. He then adopted Kitana and took the throne for himself. Not wanting the Emperor to succeed in taking over Earthrealm, Kitana helps them infiltrate Shang Tsung's fortress, disguised in the robes of his followers.

Kitana berates Tsung for his treachery to the Emperor, distracting him while Kang and Johnny free Sonya. Tsung challenges Johnny but is counter-challenged by Kang. During the battle, Kang faces not only Shang Tsung but also the souls he took in past tournaments. Tsung morphs into Chan to confuse Kang. Accepting that he is not responsible for Chan's death allows Kang to see through the charade. Liu Kang fires a fireball at Tsung, knocking him off a landing onto a bed of spikes. Tsung's death releases all of the captive souls, including Chan's. Before ascending to the afterlife, Chan tells Kang that he will remain with him in spirit until they are reunited and tells him to "Go in Peace."

The Earth warriors return to Earthrealm, where a victory celebration is taking place at Kang's Shaolin temple with Rayden waiting for them. The jubilation stops when the Emperor appears and declares he has come for the heroes' souls. Rayden and the warriors take up fighting stances.

== Cast ==
- Linden Ashby as Johnny Cage: A Hollywood superstar who enters the tournament to prove to the world that his martial arts skills are legitimate. Ashby trained in karate, tae kwon do and kung fu especially for this film.
- Cary-Hiroyuki Tagawa as Shang Tsung: A powerful sorcerer and the host of the tournament. Tagawa was the filmmakers' first and only choice for the role; he was instantly selected after he came to his audition in costume and read his lines while standing on a chair. Tagawa was allowed to play a younger version of Shang Tsung in order to avoid the excessive makeup that would have been required to duplicate the character's aged appearance in the first game.
- Robin Shou as Liu Kang: A former Shaolin monk, who enters the tournament to avenge his brother's death. He is among the first who notice Kitana's sympathy towards Earthrealm. As in most of the games in the Mortal Kombat series, Liu Kang is the main protagonist. This was Shou's second American film, as his first American role was in 1990, the made-for-television film Forbidden Nights. Shou also served as an additional fight choreographer.
- Bridgette Wilson as Sonya Blade: An American Special Forces officer pursuing Kano after he kills her partner. Wilson, who was jokingly nicknamed "RoboBabe" during production by director Paul W. S. Anderson, performed all her own stunts, including fight scenes.
- Talisa Soto as Kitana: The Outworld emperor's adopted daughter who decides to help the Earth warriors. She is attracted to Liu Kang, who reciprocates and takes her advice to go further. Soto had previously appeared alongside Tagawa in Licence to Kill.
- Trevor Goddard as Kano: An underworld crime boss who joins forces with Shang Tsung. Goddard portrayed the character as Cockney English, but due to his accent being misinterpreted, later games would change Kano from being an expatriate American to Australian.
- Christopher Lambert as Lord Rayden: The god of thunder and protector of Earthrealm who guides the warriors on their journey. He desires to aid the heroes in defending Earthrealm, but as he himself is not mortal, he is not permitted to participate in the tournament and may only advise them and act to prevent cheating. Sean Connery was offered the role, but turned it down.
- Chris Casamassa as Scorpion: An undead warrior under Shang Tsung's control. Mortal Kombat co-creator Ed Boon voiced the character.
- François Petit as Sub-Zero: A cryomancer warrior under Shang Tsung's control.
- Keith Cooke as Reptile: A creature who serves Shang Tsung. Cooke portrayed the character's human form, while his lizard form was computer generated. Reptile's vocal effects were provided by Frank Welker.
- Kenneth Edwards as Art Lean: A martial artist and friend of Johnny Cage who competes in the tournament.
- Sandy Helberg as the director of Cage's latest film. This part was originally intended as a cameo by Steven Spielberg, but scheduling conflicts forced him to back out.
- Steven Ho as Chan: Liu Kang's murdered younger brother.
- Peter Jason as Master Boyd: Johnny Cage's sensei.

Goro, the reigning Mortal Kombat champion, is physically portrayed by Tom Woodruff Jr. and voiced by Kevin Michael Richardson, both of whom were uncredited. Gregory McKinney appears as Jaxx. Frank Welker makes an uncredited appearance as the voice of the Outworld Emperor, in addition to providing vocal effects for Goro and Reptile.

== Development and pre-production ==
While Mortal Kombat II was in the playtest phase and the original Mortal Kombat had still only been released in arcades (and not for home consoles), movie producer Lawrence Kasanoff visited some friends at the game's publisher, Midway Games, and played a Mortal Kombat unit that was in their offices. He saw cinematic possibilities in the concept and expressed interest in making a film based on the game. However, Midway head Neil D. Nicastro disagreed that the game could be a successful film, particularly given the failure of past movie adaptations of video games. After months of negotiations, Kasanoff finally acquired a limited option on the Mortal Kombat film rights.

Though several top directors submitted pitches for the film, the producer chose then-unknown director Paul Anderson after he saw a screening of his 1994 debut film, Shopping, which Larry felt showed he could take an innovative approach to the material. Anderson had no experience with visual effects but was enthusiastic about making a Mortal Kombat film, so he read every book he could find on visual effects and, in his words, "kind of bluffed my way in."

=== Casting ===
Among those who auditioned for the role of Liu Kang were Jason Scott Lee, Russell Wong, Dustin Nguyen, Keith Cooke and Phillip Rhee. Ernie Reyes Jr was at one point considered for the role. A relative unknown, Robin Shou, was cast as the film's lead character. Shou was a wushu champion turned Hong Kong stuntman and actor, whose only prior credit in an American film was in the made-for-television feature Forbidden Nights. Shou, who just quit Hong Kong film industry and returned to the United States, originally turned down the role, because he thought he'd be cast as a stereotypical Asian villain. It was only after his agent told him that Liu Kang was the film's hero that he reconsidered.

Sharon Stone, Christina Applegate and Dina Meyer were originally considered for the role of Sonya Blade. Cameron Diaz was originally cast as Sonya Blade, but dropped out due to a wrist injury and was replaced by Bridgette Wilson. Wilson had accepted a role in Billy Madison after being passed up in the Mortal Kombat auditions in favor of Diaz, and so had to fly out to the set the morning after her last day filming Billy Madison.

For years, many fans assumed or believed that late actor, Brandon Lee was originally slated to play the character of Johnny Cage. Anderson confirmed in 2015, during a Q&A with fans, that Lee was never pitched an offer or heard of the project before his death in March 1993. Jean-Claude Van Damme, whose performance in Bloodsport inspired the game character, was offered the part but turned it down due to being busy filming Street Fighter, also based on a fighting video game. Coincidentally, both films were shot in Thailand. Linden Ashby got the role in part due to his past martial arts experiences, having trained in karate and taekwondo. Tom Cruise, Johnny Depp and Gary Daniels were also considered for the role.

The role of Rayden was first offered to Sean Connery, who turned it down because he didn't want to perform a physically demanding role. Danny Glover was also considered.

Mariska Hargitay was in the running for the role of Princess Kitana before Talisa Soto was cast in the role.

Cary-Hiroyuki Tagawa was the filmmakers' first and only choice for the role of Shang Tsung. He came to the audition in a costume, and read his lines while standing on a chair.

Steve James was originally cast to play Jaxx, but he died from pancreatic cancer a year before production on the film began. Michael Jai White was slated to replace him, but dropped out in order to star in Tyson. He would later play Jax in the web series Mortal Kombat: Legacy.

== Production ==
=== Filming ===
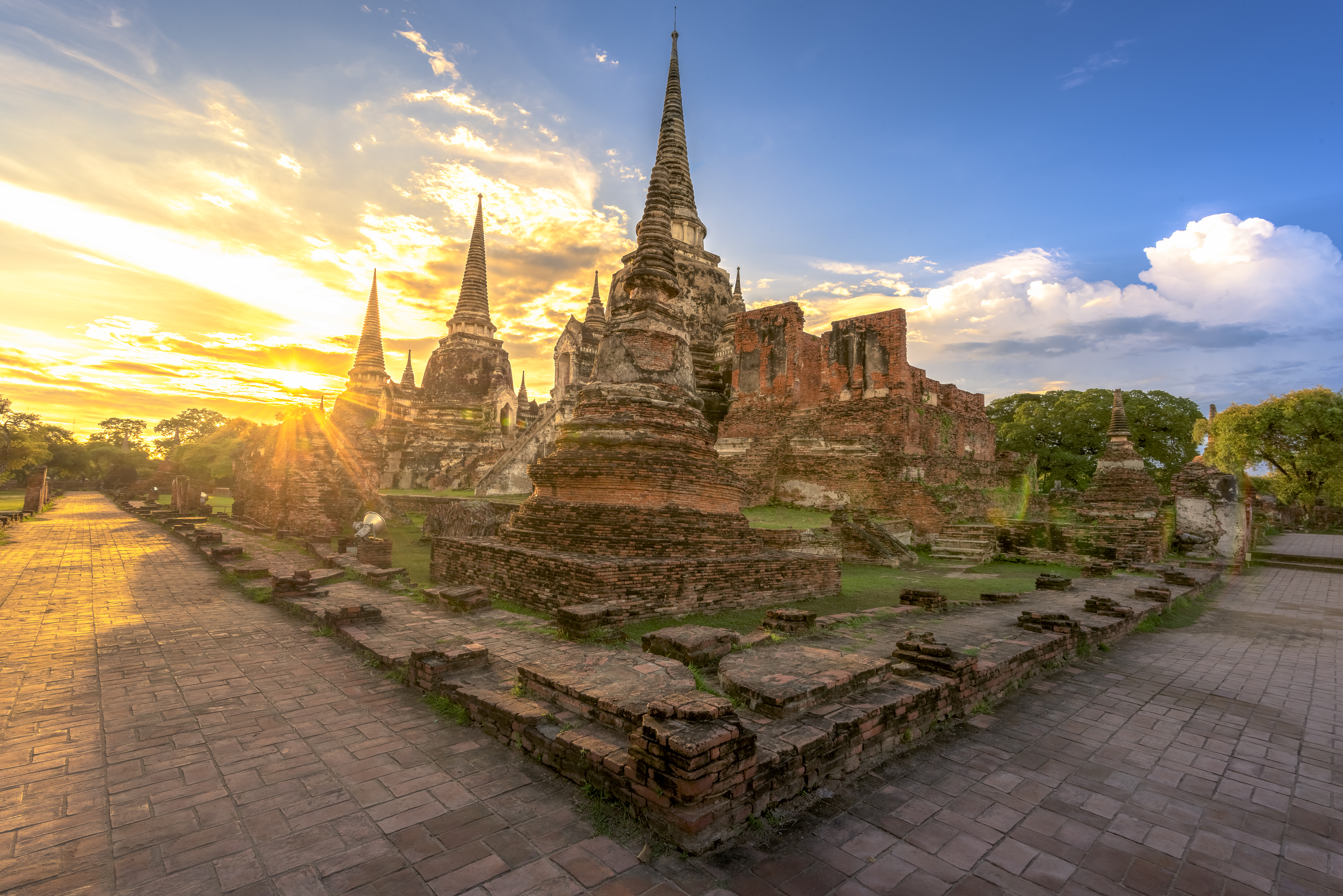
Wat Phra Si Sanphet was used in the film's opening for a fight between Shang Tsung and Liu Kang's brother.

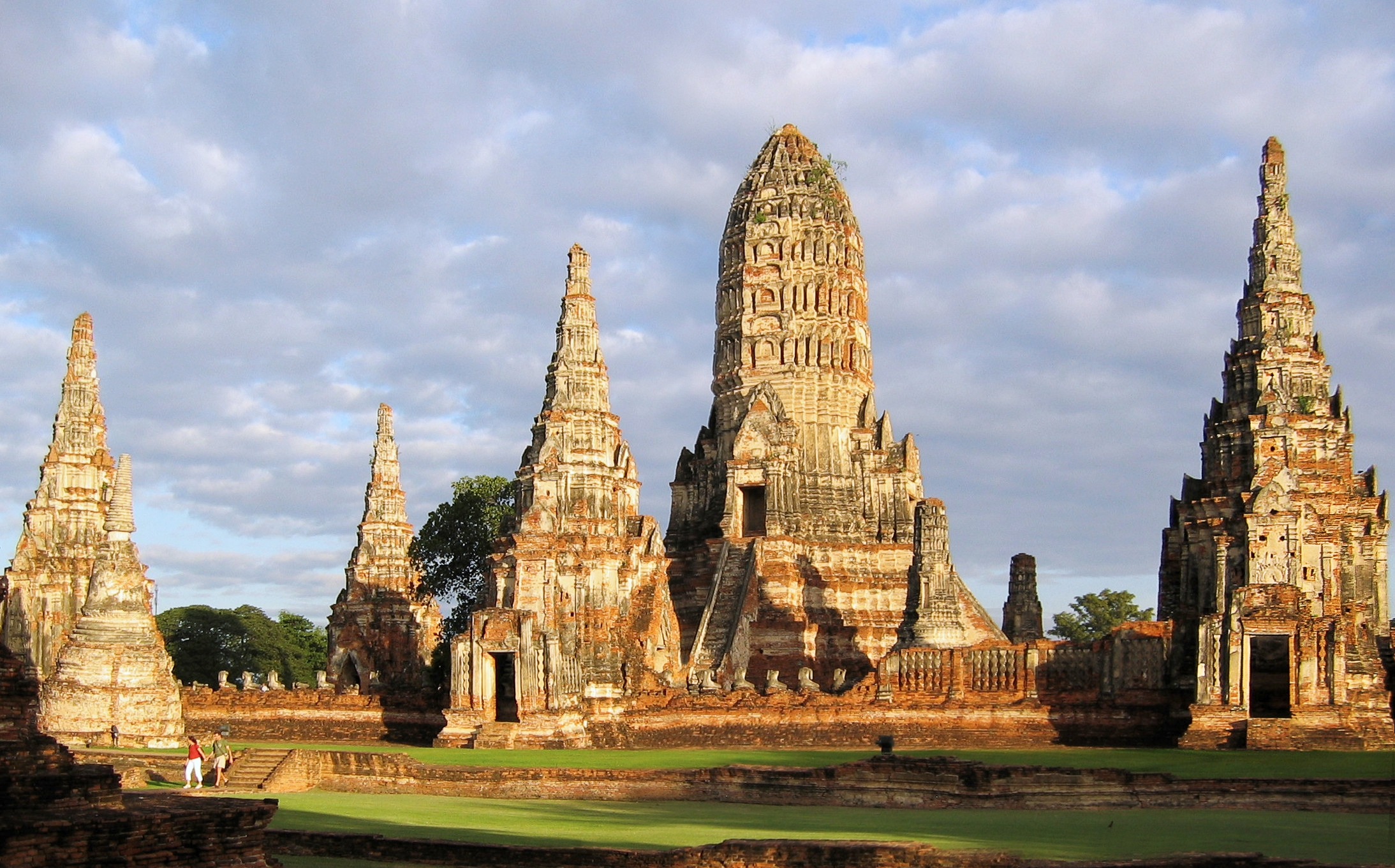
Wat Chaiwatthanaram was used as the backdrop for the Order of Light, the temple where Liu Kang was trained.

Filming began in August 1994 and ended in December 1994. The Outworld exterior scenes were filmed at the abandoned Kaiser Steel mill (now the Auto Club Speedway) in Fontana, California, while all of Goro's scenes were filmed in Los Angeles.

Shooting locations in Thailand were accessible only by boat, so cast, crew and equipment had to be transported on long canoe-style vessels. Location manager Gerrit Folsom constructed an outhouse in a secluded area near the set to alleviate the problem of repeated trips to and from the mainland. Filming locations in Thailand include the Wat Phra Si Sanphet, Wat Chaiwatthanaram and Wat Ratchaburana temples.

The arrival of Earth's contestants via boats, Liu Kang's meditation scene and the fight between Liu Kang and Kitana were filmed at the Railay Beach and the Phra Nang Beach, respectively. The bows of the boats were fitted with ornamental dragon-head carvings and used in the movie as the fighters' secondary transport to Shang Tsung's island from his personal junk.

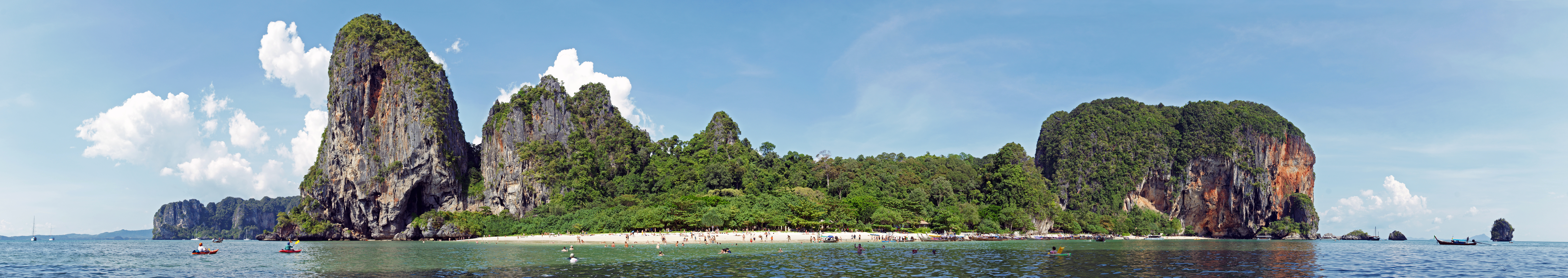
Railay beach was used as the backdrop for Earth's combatants when they arrive on Shang Tsung's island for the first time.

At Anderson's encouragement, the actors ad-libbed much of the film's dialogue, including the quips "Thank God I didn't ask him to park the car." and "Those were $500 sunglasses, asshole." Most of the cast had several weeks of training for the fight sequences prior to the filming. However, due to the last-minute recasting of the Sonya Blade role, Bridgette Wilson had to do all her training on the set. The Sonya vs. Kano fight was one of the last scenes filmed so that Wilson would have enough time to train.

Shou said that in the original script he "was supposed to fall in love with Talisa Soto [Kitana]. I was looking forward to it, but they thought we have so much action, we don't want to add romance to it. They cut it out." Also scripted but not filmed were a short battle between Sonya and Jade, another of Shang Tsung's servants, and a scene in which Shang Tsung allowed the heroes a night to mourn the loss of Art Lean and bury him in the Garden of Statues, underneath the statue of Kung Lao. The character of Reptile was originally omitted from the script but later added in response to focus groups being unimpressed with the film's early fight sequences. The fight between Reptile and Liu Kang was filmed on a set in a hangar in Van Nuys Airport. Shou and Anderson noted that neither knew what Reptile's lizard form would look like until after filming, making the pre-fight sequence difficult to shoot.

=== Fight scenes ===
The film's main fight and stunt coordinator was martial artist Pat E. Johnson, whose previous credits had included Enter the Dragon, The Karate Kid and Teenage Mutant Ninja Turtles. Because of Robin Shou's past experiences as a Hong Kong stuntman, Johnson gave him free rein to incorporate his ideas into the choreography, and Shou would ultimately be credited as "Fight choreographer: additional sequences." One of Shou's innovations was the incorporation of wirework, making Mortal Kombat one of the first Hollywood films to do so.

Despite the intensity of the fight scenes coupled with the actors performing most of their own stunts, the only notable reported injury at the time was a bruised kidney Ashby suffered while shooting Cage's fight scene with Scorpion. Scorpion's stunt double violently collided with a steel bar in the same scene, but as with most stunt person injuries, it was not widely reported in the media. Wilson dislocated her shoulder, but found she had no problems once it was put back in place and continued with the filming. Robin Shou fractured two ribs while being thrown into a pillar in the fight scene between Liu Kang and Reptile, but kept quiet about it for fear that the production would be shut down. He told only Keith Cooke, the actor who plays Reptile, asking him not to hit him on the right side of his rib cage, and finished the scene before going to the hospital.

=== Special effects ===
Goro was portrayed by an elaborate $1 million animatronic created by Tom Woodruff Jr. and Alec Gillis of Amalgamated Dynamics and operated by 13 to 16 puppeteers. This advanced construct proved a continuous source of problems on the set; Goro frequently broke down, and the person operating Goro from inside could only do so for two minutes at a time due to lack of oxygen. Though Anderson did his best to block and shoot Goro in a way that worked around the animatronic's limitations, ultimately Goro's screen time had to be severely reduced from what was originally planned.

=== MPAA rating ===
Because they wanted the film to have a PG-13 rating while staying as close as possible to the video game, the producers talked extensively with the rating board to learn the precise limitations of the rating and attempted to creatively optimize the amount of violence and foul language in the film within those limitations. For instance, they learned that the PG-13 rating forbids onscreen death, but only of human characters, so they had all the deaths of non-humans take place on screen.

== Music ==
The film's score album was composed by George S. Clinton, released by Rykodisc on October 11, 1995. The film's soundtrack album was released by TVT Records on August 15, 1995. The soundtrack album went platinum in less than a year reaching No. 10 on the Billboard 200.

Clinton's score incorporates electronic and percussive instrumentation, with heavy use of East Asian musical sources. Describing his approach to scoring the film, Clinton said

For the first test screening they had put a temporary score under it that was mainly traditional orchestral action music, and it became clear that the target audience, which was used to hearing techno music blasting during gameplay, was not happy with that approach. So that gave me the opportunity to come up with an approach I called "Techno-Taiko-Orcho." My score would have a techno core with a layer of Asian ethnic instruments (Taiko drums, shakuhachi, Tuvan throat singer) surrounded by an orchestra. But not just a regular orchestra, a Testosterone Orchestra. No treble clef instruments (no flutes, clarinets, trumpets, violins, etc.). Just 18 violas, 14 celli, six basses, and lots of low brass—and percussion. It was massive. When music supervisors John Houlihan and Sharon Boyle introduced me to guitar wizard Buckethead, I knew he would become a major element in my score as well.

The score features additional guitar work by Buckethead and drums by Brain.

The film features the title track "Mortal Kombat (Techno-Syndrome)", which had been written by Belgian music duo The Immortals for Mortal Kombat: The Album. Its use in the film cemented its status as the "Mortal Kombat theme."

== Release ==
=== Theatrical ===
The film was originally scheduled for a May 1995 U.S. release but was pushed back to August. According to Kasanoff, this was because New Line Cinema's executives felt the film had the potential to be a summer hit. It was released on October 20 in the United Kingdom, and on December 26 in Australia.

== Reception ==
=== Box office ===
Mortal Kombat opened on August 18, 1995, and was #1 at the box office for the weekend with $23.2 million, nearly eight times the opening amount of the only other new release that weekend, The Baby-Sitters Club. At the time, it was the second-highest August opening after 1993's The Fugitive. The film enjoyed a three-week stint at number one, grossing $73 million domestically in the United States. It also earned $51.7 million in other territories, for a worldwide total of $124.7 million. The film became the highest-grossing adaptation of a video game before being surpassed by Pokémon: The First Movie in 1998.

=== Critical response ===
On Rotten Tomatoes, 43% of 76 critics gave the film a positive review, with an average rating of 4.8/10. The site's critics consensus reads, "Despite an effective otherworldly atmosphere and appropriately cheesy visuals, Mortal Kombat suffers from its poorly constructed plot, laughable dialogue, and subpar acting." Metacritic gave the film a weighted average score of 60 out 100, based on 13 critics, indicating "mixed or average reviews". Audiences polled by CinemaScore gave the film an average grade of "A−" on an A+ to F scale.

Reviewers praised its atmosphere, fighting sequences, production values and visuals. However, its PG-13 rating and to a lesser extent, the performances and writing were criticized. Lisa Schwarzbaum of Entertainment Weekly called Mortal Kombat "a contentedly empty-headed extended advertisement for the joy of joypads (filmed in cheesily ornate cinema de Hong Kong style)" and too noted how it "is notably free of blood and gore." Stephen Holden of The New York Times said "Mortal Kombat might be described as mythological junk food. Although there is talk of the three kombatants' having to face their deepest fears to prevail, the action is so frenetic and the dialogue so minimal that the allegory is weightless." Roger Ebert said he was "right in the middle" and noted that the fans might be disappointed by the film's killings being much less brutal than the notoriously violent Mortal Kombat video games. Marc Savlov from The Austin Chronicle mentioned that, "It's the cinematic equivalent of cotton candy and Rock 'Em Sock 'Em Robots, but you may recall, you loved that stuff as a kid. I know I did," giving it a 2.5/5 star rating. Laura Evenson from San Francisco Chronicle mentioned "Mortal Kombat the movie has everything a teenage boy could want: snakes that jut out of a villain's palms, acrobatic kung- fu fighting and a couple of battling babes. Everything, that is, but an interesting plot, decent dialogue, and compelling acting" and concluded that it will likely become a cult classic.

Kevin Thomas of the Los Angeles Times gave the film a glowing review, writing that "as impressive as the special effects are at every turn, even more crucial is Jonathan Carlson's superb, imaginative production design, which combines Thailand exteriors with vast sets that recall the barbaric grandeur of exotic old movie palaces and campy Maria Montez epics. John R. Leonetti's glorious, shadowy camera work and George S. Clinton's driving, hard-edged score complete the task of bringing alive the perilous Outworld". Gene Siskel of the Chicago Tribune gave it a "thumbs up" rating on Siskel & Ebert, calling it "the only halfway decent video game turned into a movie that I've seen" and "a lot of fun", saying he was positively surprised by its various high-quality production values, including the "often sensational" special effects, the exotic locations, and the cast of characters being "clearly drawn with appealing types". Leonard Klady from Variety awarded the film a 3.5/5 stars, stating, "But where others have sunk in the mire of imitation, director Paul Anderson and writer Kevin Droney effect a viable balance between exquisitely choreographed action and ironic visual and verbal counterpoint". Kim Newman from Empire magazine said, "By the time the big, world-saving bout comes around, it's hard not to wish that Shung Tsu [sic] would settle the fate of mankind by asking Liu Kang what the capital of Venezuela is... rather than engaging him in yet another round of supernaturally assisted dirty fighting," with a final rating of 3 stars out of 5.

=== Legacy and re-evaluation ===
From the 1998 founding of Rotten Tomatoes until 2018, Mortal Kombat held the highest critical rating on the site of any video game adaptation. Critical re-evaluations have been mixed but mostly positive due to the well-crafted action sequences, the cast performances and the exotic set designs, and the film is considered a cult classic.

A 2020 editorial that discusses the work of Paul WS Anderson on Rotten Tomatoes said of Mortal Kombat, "Critics were split at 47% on the Tomatometer, but audiences loved the electronic soundtrack, creative fight scenes, and diverse cast of committed actors who sacrificed multiple bruised ribs to bless us with some excellent brawls." The editorial attributed the film's box office success chiefly to its conscious playfulness, asserting that "Anderson and his talented crew knew what they were making, and they made it earnestly." Bloody Disgusting commented that "thanks to the kinetic speed in which the actors are moving, the high-octane music, and ironically, the movement of the camera, each fight is given ample feeling and aggression", particularly praising the Scorpion/Johnny Cage and Liu Kang/Reptile fights.

In 2020, Rotten Tomatoes discussed the film in the "Rotten Tomatoes Is Wrong" podcast series. Scott Johnson criticized the film as not being a faithful adaptation, citing, in particular, the absence of R-rated gore. Co-panelist Jacqueline Coley countered that an R rating would have blocked the Mortal Kombat fan base from attending and that the adaptation successfully captures the essence of the games. Mark Ellis agreed, arguing that the film mimics the game's minimal plot by focusing on the tournament, creating an experience similar to watching March Madness. JoBlo.com called Mortal Kombat "colorful, ambitious, and surprisingly funny; Anderson tied everything around a perfect cast led by the great Robin Shou." Screen Rant referred to the choreography as "top notch", the locations as "amazing", the soundtrack as "pure perfection", and the cast as "dedicated and outstanding", but the CGI as cartoonish and "laughable", the violence as not true to the source material, the Goro animatronic as "not even that impressive by 1995 standards", and the portrayals of Scorpion and Sub-Zero as insulting and "completely wasted". CBR mentioned that Mortal Kombat is "an above-average martial arts classic that was high on fun and easily one of the most rewatchable video game movies, 25 years later". Bloody Disgusting said the film does an excellent job of paying tribute to its source material by including a large number of characters from the game without any of them feeling shoehorned in and by capturing the intense action feel of the game, while Collider stated that "The film knows how to walk the line between reverence and goofiness".

Cary Hiroyuki Tagawa's take on Shang Tsung is now regarded as the ideal portrayal of the sorcerer. JoBlo.com noted that every actor who has taken the role since has been compared to Tagawa, commenting that his delivery "has all the cadence and embellished style like he's on Broadway, but he holds himself physically like he's just casually laying down the law. Tagawa is Shang Tsung." Screen Rant reported that while they felt all the main cast members were equally outstanding, Tagawa was "the best casting of the movie to many". Christopher Lambert as Lord Rayden has also received positive coverage with JoBlo.com commenting that he "lent the production maturity and star power" while CBR mentioned that he "steals every scene he appears, delivering ridiculous lines like, 'The fate of billions depends upon you,' before laughing and apologizing".

Mortal Kombat 11 paid tribute to the first movie with numerous Easter eggs as well as bringing back Cary Hiroyuki Tagawa to play Shang Tsung in the "Aftermath" storyline. Subsequent downloadable content would feature voices and likenesses from Christopher Lambert, Linden Ashby and Bridgette Wilson-Sampras as Raiden, Johnny Cage and Sonya Blade, respectively.

=== Home media ===
Mortal Kombat was released on VHS on December 27, 1995, by Turner Home Entertainment. It proved successful in the home video market, and was one of the top-25 selling videos of 1996 in the United States. The film was released on DVD on March 26, 1997, by New Line Home Video (one of the titles available on the format’s U.S. launch). It was later released on Blu-ray on April 19, 2011, by Warner Home Video. A 4K UHD Blu-ray edition (as part of the Mortal Kombat Kollection with Mortal Kombat: Annihilation) was released by Arrow Video on June 30, 2026.

== Franchise ==
=== Sequel ===
A sequel entitled Mortal Kombat Annihilation was released in 1997. It was directed by John R. Leonetti, who was the cinematographer of the first film. Only Robin Shou and Talisa Soto reprised their roles, with the others being recast. Its storyline is largely an adaptation of Mortal Kombat 3, following Earthrealm's warriors in their battle against Shao Kahn.

=== Cancelled sequel ===
In contrast to its predecessor, Mortal Kombat Annihilation was critically panned and failed at the box office. As a result, development of the planned third installment halted and never progressed beyond pre-production. In July 2009, actors Chris Casamassa (Scorpion) and Linden Ashby (Johnny Cage) separately announced that they would be reprising their respective roles from the original film, with Casamassa additionally claiming that filming would begin in September of that year, but the project did not commence production.

=== Animated film ===
On August 29, 1995, New Line Home Video, Turner Home Entertainment and Threshold Entertainment released a tie-in animated film on VHS and LaserDisc, titled Mortal Kombat: The Journey Begins. Also written by Kevin Droney it serves as an introduction to the characters and lore of the series. It follows the protagonists Liu Kang, Johnny Cage and Sonya Blade as they travel on a mysterious boat to the Mortal Kombat tournament. On the way they meet Rayden, who provides them with hints about how to survive the tournament and defeat Shang Tsung and his army of Tarkatan minions. Upon arriving at the island where the battles take place, Rayden retells the origins of Shang Tsung, Goro, Scorpion, Sub-Zero and the Great Kung Lao in between fight scenes.

The film featured a combination of traditional animation, motion capture and CGI to explain the origins behind some of the movie's main characters, as well as a fifteen-minute behind-the-scenes documentary of the theatrical release. Trailers of the film were seen on the promotional screener VHS copy, and on other VHS releases from Turner Home Entertainment and New Line Home Video. In 2011 the film was included on Mortal Kombat DVD and Blu-ray releases in certain regions.

=== Television series ===
Threshold Entertainment produced two television series related to the film, the animated Mortal Kombat: Defenders of the Realm and the live-action Mortal Kombat: Conquest. Defenders of the Realm, which aired on the USA Network's Action Extreme Team animation block in 1996, served as an alternative sequel and featured Liu Kang, Kitana, Sub-Zero, Sonya Blade, Jax, Kurtis Stryker and Nightwolf as the eponymous heroes. Conquest served as a prequel centered on the Great Kung Lao, accompanied by original characters Siro and Taja, and aired in syndication from 1998 to 1999. Both series received negative reviews and were cancelled after one season.

=== Reboot ===
In 2021, New Line Cinema produced a new Mortal Kombat reboot film, which was released by Warner Bros. Pictures in April 2021 in theaters and HBO Max.

== Novelization ==
A novelization of the movie by "Martin Delrio" (James D. Macdonald and Debra Doyle) was released through Tor Books. It is based on an early version of the film's script, and as such it includes several deleted or unfilmed scenes, such as a fight between Sonya Blade and Jade.

== See also ==
- List of films based on video games
