= Fatal Termination =

1990 Hong Kong film by Andrew Kam

- Traditional Chinese: 赤色大風暴
- Simplified Chinese: 赤色大风暴
- Hanyu Pinyin: Chì sè dà fēng bào
- Directed by: Andrew Kam
- Written by: Chi-Ming Pang
- Produced by: Norman Cheung; Phillip Ko; Man-Chung Ma
- Starring: Moon Lee; Robin Shou; Ray Lui; Phillip Ko
- Release date: 1990
- Country: Hong Kong

Fatal Termination (also known as Death Blow, original title Chi se da feng bao) is a 1990 Hong Kong action film starring Moon Lee and Robin Shou.

== Plot ==
A Hong Kong cop's wife seeks revenge after the abduction of her daughter by a ruthless munitions dealer.

== Critical reception ==
Severed Cinema, "Fatal Termination is a memorable action time piece which I recommend checking out just for its bonkers antics."

== See also ==
- Cinema of Hong Kong
