= Nathan Wang =

American film composer (b. 1956)

- Born: Nathan Tsung-hsien Wang; August 8, 1956 (age 70); Los Angeles, California, U.S.
- Genre: Film score
- Website: www.nathanwang.com

Chinese name
- Traditional Chinese: 王宗賢
Transcriptions
Standard Mandarin
- Hanyu Pinyin: Wáng Zōngxián
Yue: Cantonese
- Jyutping: Wong^{4} Zung^{1} Jin^{4}

Nathan Tsung-hsien Wang (Chinese: 王宗賢; born August 8, 1956) is an American film composer, who has worked extensively in both the United States and in Hong Kong. He is best known internationally for his work with Jackie Chan, and with directors Benny Chan and Stanley Tong. He also scored the Detective Chinatown film series.

== Early life and education ==
Wang was born in Los Angeles, California, to parents from Shanghai, China. He began playing the piano at age three. He attended Pomona College, graduating in 1979, and received an Ambassadorial Scholarship from Rotary International to study at Oxford University.

== Career ==
Wang's first film score was for the comedy Screwball Hotel.

In 1995, Wang was hired by Hong Kong film studio Golden Harvest to score the Jackie Chan film Rumble in the Bronx. The film proved a hit and Chan's North American breakthrough. Wang has subsequently scored Chan's films Police Story 4: First Strike (1996), Who Am I? (1998),

He also worked with notable Chinese-language filmmakers like Stanley Tong, Benny Chan, Chen Sicheng (on the Detective Chinatown films)

Wang is also an associate professor of film scoring at Peking University.

== Composer ==
- Never Say Never (2023)
- Vanguard (2020)
- Far East Deep South (2020)
- Playing with Fire (2019)
- Wished (2017)
- The Healer (2017)
- Detective Chinatown (2015)
- The Patriot Yue Fei (2015)
- Brotherhood of Blades (2014)
- Farmland (2014)
- Sleeping Dogs (2012) (Multi platform game)
- Inseparable (2011)
- You Again (2010)
- Sophie's Revenge (2009)
- The Legend of Pancho Barnes and the Happy Bottom Riding Club (2009)
- How to Make Love to a Woman (2009)
- Van Wilder: Freshman Year (2009)
- War Dogs of the Pacific (2009)
- Hatching Pete (2009) (TV)
- Inspire Me: Weightless Flights of Discovery (2009)
- It's All About the Benjamins (2009)
- The Age of Believing: The Disney Live Action Classics (2008) (TV) (original music by)
- Valentine (12 episodes, 2008)
  - "God Only Knows" (2008), TV episode
  - "She's Gone" (2008) TV episode
  - "The Book of Love" (2008), TV episode
  - "Act Naturally" (2008), TV episode
  - "Daddy's Home" (2008) TV episode
- Nuptials of the Dead (2008) (original music by)
- Jack N Jill (2008)
- Minutemen (2008) (TV)
- Labou (2008) (V)
- The Final Season (2007)
- The Game Plan (2007)
- Johnny Kapahala: Back on Board (2007) (TV)
- Tina Bobina (2007)
- Flight of the Living Dead: Outbreak on a Plane (2007) (V)
  - ... a.k.a. Flight of the Living Dead (US: new title)
- Highlander: The Search for Vengeance (2007) (V)
- Everest E.R. (2006)
- Wendy Wu: Homecoming Warrior (2006) (TV)
- The World According to Sesame Street (2006)
- Ten Days That Unexpectedly Changed America: Massacre at Mystic (2006) (TV)
- She's the Man (2006)
  - ... a.k.a. L'homme c'est elle (Canada: French title)
- Tom and Jerry: The Fast and the Furry (2005) (V)
- Enter the Dragonfly (2005)
- San wa (2005)
  - ... a.k.a. Shen hua (Hong Kong: Mandarin title)
  - ... a.k.a. The Myth (International: English title)
- A Really Big Problem (2005)
- One Six Right (2005)
- Come as You Are (2005)
- The American Experience (1 episode, 2005)
  - "The Great Transatlantic Cable" (2005), TV episode
- Reefer Madness: The Movie Musical (2005)
  - ... a.k.a. Kifferwahn (Germany)
- Perceptions (2005) (co-composer)
  - ... a.k.a. Dangerous Perceptions (US: new title)
- The Four Chaplains: Sacrifice at Sea (2004) (TV)
- A Remarkable Promise (2004)
- "Voices from the List" (2004) (V)
- Burma Bridge Busters (2003) (TV)
- Charlie's War (2003)
- Red Trousers: The Life of the Hong Kong Stuntmen (2003)
  - ... a.k.a. Hong ku zi (Hong Kong: Mandarin title)
  - ... a.k.a. Hung fu zi (Hong Kong: Cantonese title)
- Who's Your Daddy? (2003/I) (V)
- Price for Peace (2002)
- The Black Magic (2002)
- A Salute to Robert Altman, an American Maverick (2002) (TV)
- American Family (2002) TV series (unknown episodes)
  - ... a.k.a. American Family: Journey of Dreams (US: second season title)
- Vacuums (2002)
  - ... a.k.a. Stealing Bess (US: video title)
- Shoot! (2001)
- Nine Dog Christmas (2001) (V)
- Forbidden City (2001)
- Leui ting jin ging (2000)
  - ... a.k.a. China Strike Force (Hong Kong: English title) (US)
  - ... a.k.a. Lei ting zhan jing (Hong Kong: Mandarin title)
- That's Life (2 episodes, 2000)
  - "The Screw-Up" (2000), TV episode
  - "Pilot" (2000), TV episode
- "Rock, Paper, Scissors" (2000)
- Grandma Got Run Over by a Reindeer (2000) (TV)
- Brightness (2000)
- NetAid (1999) (TV)
- Sabrina: The Animated Series (1999) TV series (unknown episodes)
  - ... a.k.a. Sabrina (US: short title)
- The Brothers Flub (1999) (TV)
- Storm (1999) (V)
  - ... a.k.a. Storm Trackers
- Dak ging san yan lui (1999)
  - ... a.k.a. Gen-X Cops (Hong Kong: English title) (International: English title: literal title)
  - ... a.k.a. Te jing xin ren lei (Hong Kong: Mandarin title)
- Clowns (1999)
- The Water Ghost (1998)
- Wo shi shei (1998)
  - ... a.k.a. Jackie Chan's Who Am I? (US: cable TV title)
  - ... a.k.a. Who Am I?
- Fat Dog Mendoza (1998), TV series
- Moses: Egypt's Great Prince (1998) (V)
- Toonsylvania (1998), TV series (unknown episodes)
  - ... a.k.a. "Steven Spielberg Presents Toonsylvania"
- The Secret of Mulan (1998) (V)
- The Magic Pearl (1997)
- The Lost Children of Berlin (1997)
- The Secret of Anastasia (1997) (V)
- Muppet Treasure Island (1996) (VG)
- Bruno the Kid (1996) TV series (unknown episodes)
- "Tales from the Crypt" (1 episode, 1996)
  - ... a.k.a. "HBO's Tales from the Crypt"
  - "The Third Pig" (1996), TV episode
- Ging chaat goo si 4: Ji gaan daan yam mo (1996)
  - ... a.k.a. Jackie Chan's First Strike (US)
  - ... a.k.a. Jing cha gu shi 4: Zhi jian dan ren wu (Hong Kong: Mandarin title)
  - ... a.k.a. Police Story 4: First Strike (Hong Kong: English title)
- Bruno the Kid: The Animated Movie (1996) (V)
- Siegfried & Roy: Masters of the Impossible (1996) (V)
- The Twisted Adventures of Felix the Cat (1995), TV series
  - ... a.k.a. The Twisted Tales of Felix the Cat (US: cable TV title)
- Hung fan au (1995)
  - ... a.k.a. Rumble in the Bronx (Hong Kong: English title) (US)
  - ... a.k.a. Hong fan ou (Hong Kong: Mandarin title)
  - ... a.k.a. Red Bronx
  - ... a.k.a. Zizanie dans le Bronx (Canada: French title)
- The Shnookums & Meat Funny Cartoon Show (1995) TV series (unknown episodes)
- Natural Causes (1994)
- Black Belt Angels (1994)
- Nick and Noel (1993) (TV)
- Animated Classic Showcase (1993) (TV)
- Return to Zork (1993) (VG)
- Eek! the Cat (1992) TV series (unknown episodes)
  - ... a.k.a. Eek! and the Terrible Thunderlizards
  - ... a.k.a. Eek!stravaganza
- Bill & Ted's Excellent Adventures (1992), TV series (unknown episodes)
- Spellcaster (1992)
- The Kiss (1992)
- China Beach (2 episodes, 1990)
  - "A Rumor of Peace" (1990), TV episode
  - "Holly's Choice" (1990), TV episode
- Encyclopedia Brown (1989), TV series (unknown episodes)
- Screwball Hotel (1988)

== Music department ==
2000s 1990s 1980s

- One Six Right (2005) (orchestrator)
- Sabrina: The Animated Series (composer: additional music) (22 episodes, 1999)
- ... a.k.a. "Sabrina" (USA: short title)
  - "Anywhere But Here" (1999) TV episode (composer: additional music)
- Boogie Shoes (1999) TV episode (composer: additional music)
- Boy Meets Bike (1999) TV episode (composer: additional music)
- Extreme Harvey (1999) TV episode (composer: additional music)
- Feats of Clay (1999) TV episode (composer: additional music)
- The Last Days (1998) (associate composer) (orchestrator)
- Flesh Gordon Meets the Cosmic Cheerleaders (1989) (composer: additional music)
- ... a.k.a. Flesh Gordon 2
- Soundtrack:
- Wo shi shei (1998) (writer: "Friendship")
- ... a.k.a. Jackie Chan's Who Am I? (USA: cable TV title)
- ... a.k.a. Who Am I?
- Hung fan au (1995) (writer: "You Are The One")
- ... a.k.a. Rumble in the Bronx (Hong Kong: English title) (USA)
- ... a.k.a. Hong fan ou (Hong Kong: Mandarin title)
- ... a.k.a. Red Bronx
- ... a.k.a. Zizanie dans le Bronx (Canada: French title)
- Actor:
- Who's Your Daddy? (2003/I) (V) .... The Arnold Horshack Experience
