= Muppet Treasure Island (video game) =

1996 video game

- Developer: Activision
- Publisher: Activision
- Director: Mark Loparco
- Producer: Mark Loparco
- Programmers: James Edward Anhalt III; Rachel Rubin Franklin
- Artist: Nicholas Koenig
- Writer: Larry Kay
- Composer: Nathan Wang
- Series: The Muppets
- Platforms: Windows, Mac OS
- Release: 1996
- Genre: Adventure
- Mode: Single-player

Muppet Treasure Island is a point-and-click CD-ROM game for Windows, produced in 1996 by Activision in association with Jim Henson Interactive to tie in with the release of Muppet Treasure Island.

== Gameplay ==
The player controls Hawkins, who leaves the Admiral Benbow Inn to sail to Treasure Island. Gonzo and Rizzo accompany the player, as well as Stevenson the Parrot, a new Muppet character who provides hints throughout the game. The Muppet characters are video clips overlaid on an animated background.

== Development ==
The game's voice cast includes Frank Oz, Steve Whitmire, Dave Goelz, Jerry Nelson, Kevin Clash, Bill Barretta, Bruce Lanoil, John Kennedy, Louise Gold, and Mark Mansfield. Tim Curry and Billy Connolly are Long John Silver and Billy Bones respectively. The game was developed on a budget in excess of $3 million.

A DVD-ROM version was announced at COMDEX 1996, and would be eventually bundled with some OEM DVD-ROM kits.

In 2023, Muppet Treasure Island became playable on modern systems through ScummVM, an open-source game preservation project, which added support for the game’s original Windows and Macintosh CD-ROM releases. The title was developed using the multimedia authoring engine mTropolis, making it one of a limited number of games built with the tool to receive ScummVM support.

== Reception ==
The game received positive reviews from critics. PC Zone gave the game 80 out 100 in a review. Entertainment Weekly gave the game an A. Entertainment Weekly praised the game’s humour and design, describing it as one of the most inventive and engaging point-and-click adventure games for children at the time.
