= Black Belt Angels =

- Film poster
- Directed by: Chi Kim
- Written by: Chi Kim (Screenplay); Chi Kim and Greg Mellott (Story)
- Produced by: Kim Augustine; Glaister Kerr
- Starring: Shawna Larson; Rebekah Bartlett; Shannon Marketic; Nicole Burks; Ka'imi Kuoha; Frank DeAngelo
- Cinematography: Frank Harris
- Edited by: Kim Augustine; Dean R. Baker; Jennifer Hatton
- Music by: Efrem Bergman; Ivan Koutikov; Jimmy Lifton; Nathan Wang
- Production companies: Showcase Entertainment Inc. Silver Bell Film Inc.
- Distributed by: Eagle Entertainment
- Release date: 1994 (US)
- Running time: 84 min.
- Country: United States
- Language: English

Black Belt Angels is a 1994 American action film co-written and directed by Chi Kim and starring Shawna Larson, Rebekah Bartlett, Shannon Marketic, Nicole Burks, Ka'imi Kuoha and Frank DeAngelo.

== Premise ==
A greedy mobster plans to close down The Master Martial Arts school, but he is unaware that its owner and his four daughters all have black belts and are prepared to fight to save it.

== Cast ==
- Shawna Larson as Kirsten Robinson
- Rebekah Bartlett as Tracy Robinson
- Shannon Marketic as Julie Morgan
- Nicole Burks as Shawna
- Ka'imi Kuoha as Lupe
- Frank DeAngelo as Mr. Lucero

== Production ==
Black Belt Angels was mostly filmed at San Diego, California.
