= Funk do Mortal Kombat =

Single by Funk You Bit
- Language: Brazilian Portuguese
- English title: Mortal Kombat Funk
- Released: 30 March 2011
- Genre: Funk carioca
- Length: 3:30
- Songwriter(s): Leonardo Peixoto; Gibran Sirena

Music video
- "Funk do Mortal Kombat" on YouTube

"Funk do Mortal Kombat" is a remix of "Techno Syndrome" in funk carioca style, released by the musical group Funk You Bit. The song was originally published on YouTube in 2011, and became a hit in one month.

== Creation and release ==
Funk do Mortal Kombat was composed by Leonardo Peixoto, psychology student, and Gibran Sirena, audiovisual student, both from Universidade de Santa Cruz do Sul. Sirena created the music group Funk You Bit with Peixoto as a way to gain subscribers for his YouTube channel. The song is a remix of "Techno Syndrome" in the funk style. Even though the music is a funk composition, both are fans of rock and metal and didn't give much attention for the style beforehand. Peixoto was the composer of the lyrics. The video was filmed with the camera of Sirena's mother and took nearly an year to be produced. The song was released in 30 March 2011 on GibranST YouTube channel.

Initially, Funk do Mortal Kombat was not monetized due concerns with copyright, but after the original video reached from 3 to 5 million views, the authors decided to monetize the song, but not the videoclip.

== Lyrics ==
The lyrics goes around Peixoto and Sirena choosing a character to play Mortal Kombat II as they sing about their characteristics in an humorous way. Several parts of the lyrics are considered sexist. The chorus emphasizes Sub-Zero, as this was the character Peixoto played best.

== Reception ==
The original video was published near the release of Mortal Kombat 9 and surpassed a million views after a bit more than one month from the release. Because of the sudden success, Funk You Bit participated from Eliana TV show and YouPIX Festival. Peixoto and Sirena also participated from an advertisement for the Skinny potato chips. In 2021, the video reached 21 million visualizations.

Because of the popularity of the song, there was expectation for the release of a second song. Funk You Bit began composing "Funk do Dragon Ball", but they gave up because of inconsistent information from the franchise on the lyrics.

The YouTube channel O Metaleiro composed a reinterpretation of "Funk do Mortal Kombat" in the metal style.
