= Tiger Cage 2 =

1990 Hong Kong film by Yuen Woo-ping

- Film poster
- Traditional Chinese: 洗黑錢
- Simplified Chinese: 洗黑钱
- Hanyu Pinyin: Xǐ Hēi Qián
- Jyutping: Sai2 Hak1 Cin2
- Directed by: Yuen Woo-ping
- Written by: Patrick Yuen Yau-kwong
- Produced by: Stephen Shin
- Starring: Donnie Yen; Rosamund Kwan; David Wu; Robin Shou; Garry Chow; Carol Cheng; Cynthia Khan
- Cinematography: Mark Lee Ping-bing
- Edited by: Kwok Ting-hung
- Music by: Richard Yuen Cheuk-fan
- Production company: D & B Films Co., Ltd.
- Distributed by: D & B Film Distribution
- Release date: 11 August 1990
- Running time: 102 minutes
- Country: Hong Kong
- Language: Cantonese
- Box office: HK$6,395,102

Tiger Cage 2 is a 1990 Hong Kong action film directed by Yuen Woo-ping and starring Donnie Yen. The film is a sequel to the 1988 film Tiger Cage, which was also directed by Yuen, and features a new storyline with returning cast members Yen and Carol Cheng in different roles.

== Plot ==
Dragon Yau is a hot-headed ex-cop whose attitude has got him in trouble with his bosses and his wife. On a trip to the divorce lawyers, he is witness to a robbery where a shootout ensues and a suitcase of money disappears. During the same shootout Lawyer Mandy Chang also witnesses and becomes unintentionally involved with said events. On a trip to the hospital Mandy wrongly accuses Dragon who she believes is a robber, an argument causes Dragon to be knocked out by Tak a police officer and former colleague.

At the hospital an unconscious Dragon is mistakenly kidnapped by goons sent to pick up Mandy, and then thrown out of a moving van when the mistake is noticed. Meanwhile, Waise Chow who is involved with money laundering argues with David who was in charge of the suitcase while his girlfriend and Mandy's housemate Petty Lee listens in on the conversation.

Dragon later follows Mandy from the hospital to her apartment meanwhile Petty Lee is murdered by someone in a biker's outfit. Mandy arrives at the apartment and argues with Dragon only to find Petty Lee dead on the floor. Police arrive led by Inspector Yeung who suspects Mandy of murder has both her and Dragon handcuffed only for the true killer to start and shootout with the police while Dragon and Mandy escape. Now on the run they are pursued by David who believes they have the suitcase, after running through the city they hide in Dragon's apartment for the evening. The next morning they see on the news that both of them alongside the killer are fugitives, they then hunt down David to find out why he is following them. After fighting each other and escaping from goons David leaves them his phone number and then proceeds to visit Uncle Chiu and Waise Chow determined to find the money. After going out for dinner Dragon and Mandy are pursued across the city and captured by goons who take them to Waise Chow.

While captured they are interrogated over the suitcase while Waise Chow has a meeting with shady business partners. Dragon and Mandy escape and meet with Tak who at first refuses to help them but relents and takes them to his apartment. While there they invite and interrogate David meanwhile Tak tries to blackmail Waise Chow by recording him. He is suspended when Inspector Yeung arrives and Waise Chow reveals he was also recording Tak, which leads to his suspension. While there Inspector Yeung notices an assistant has a wound on her shoulder in the same place that the killer was shot and follows her home where a fight ensues and the assistant while on the run is killed by another person in Biker gear who is then pursued and killed by Yeung.

While obtaining a car Dragon, Mandy and David are hunted down by more goons only for Dragon to get separated and pursued by the police. He then meets them at a hotel where they talk over the events that happened at the law firm and realise the suitcase was hidden in the elevator, they then disguise themselves as maintenance workers and recover the suitcase. After celebrating finding the suitcase David then returns it to Uncle Chiu only to find he has been killed by Waise Chow, after a fight ensues David mortally wounded is found by Dragon and Mandy before he dies.

Mandy discovers a note in David's hand which lists the location of a meeting point while Dragon has a sword fight with one of Waise Chow's shady partners. After killing his opponent Dragon argues with Mandy over his intentions which leads him to knocking her unconscious, he then proceeds to the meeting point with Tak where after a shootout with more goons and Dragon defeating Waise Chow's other shady partner they both confront Waise. Tak is fatally shot and Waise taunts Dragon but is sneaked up on by Mandy who knocks him to the ground with a pole, Waise and Dragon then fight until Mandy leaps down and again hit's Waise with the pole killing him.

== Alternative Malaysian ending ==
In the Malaysian cut the film instead ends with Inspector Yeung and other officers sneaking in to the warehouse while Waise taunts Dragon, which leads to Yeung and Waise fighting until he is defeated and handcuffed.

It then finishes with Tak being loaded in to an ambulance while Waise is arrested. Inspector Yeung then thanks Mandy for assisting the police, which she replies is her duty for Law & Justice.

== Cast ==
- Donnie Yen as Dragon Yau
- Rosamund Kwan as Mandy Chang
- David Wu as David
- Robin Shou as Waise Chow Man Wai
- Garry Chow as Tak
- Carol Cheng as Petty Lee (guest star)
- Cynthia Khan as Inspector Yeung (guest star)
- Lo Lieh as Uncle Chiu
- Leung Lam-ling as Ms. Leung
- Michael Woods as American Mafia 1
- John Salvitti as American Mafia 2
- Dickson Lee as Kent
- Anita Lee as Ann
- Cha Chuen-yee as Philip
- Tang Wai-yiu
