= Forbidden Nights =

- Promotional material from the TV Guide
- Based on: The Rocky Course of Love in China by Judith Shapiro
- Written by: Tristine Rainer
- Story by: Tristine Rainer; David Hwang
- Directed by: Waris Hussein
- Starring: Melissa Gilbert; Robin Shou; Victor K. Wong
- Theme music composer: Lucia Hwong
- Country of origin: United States
- Original language: English

Production
- Executive producer: Tristine Rainer
- Producer: Charles Jennings
- Production locations: Kowloon, Hong Kong
- Cinematography: Brian West
- Editors: Parkie Singh; Diane Adler
- Running time: 96 minutes
- Production companies: Tristine Rainer Productions; Warner Bros. Television

Original release
- Network: CBS
- Release: April 10, 1990

Forbidden Nights is a 1990 American made-for-television drama film directed by Waris Hussein and based on the article The Rocky Course of Love in China written by Judith Shapiro. The film was shot in Hong Kong and stars Melissa Gilbert, Robin Shou and Victor K. Wong. The film also marked the American debut of Shou, who wouldn't act in another American film until Mortal Kombat in 1995.

== Plot ==
Set in Red China in 1979, the film focuses on Judith Shapiro, an American teacher who falls in love with Liang Heng, a Chinese radical, trying to bring political reform to his homeland. She puts all her wishes and dreams away to fit into his ideals, but soon, trouble starts to come.

== Cast ==
- Melissa Gilbert as Judith Shapiro
- Robin Shou as Liang Heng
- Victor K. Wong as Ho
- Tzi Ma as Li Dao
- Stephen Fung as Young Liang Heng
