= The Immortals (band) =

Belgian electronic music group

The Immortals are a band consisting of Belgian electronic musicians Maurice "Praga Khan" Engelen and Olivier Adams, best known for their work in the techno/industrial dance/New Beat band Lords of Acid.

The side project was created for the first Mortal Kombat soundtrack in 1994; however, they debuted their track "Techno Syndrome (Mortal Kombat)" in 1993 when it was released as a single. The original music was mixed with sound effects from the Mortal Kombat arcade game. The song was used as part of the Mortal Kombat commercial for the home systems that announced its single release as well. It was also used in TV commercials for the Mortal Kombat movie and Mortal Kombat: Live Tour, and it was released the same year when the game was released for home consoles. The track has also subsequently become known as "the Mortal Kombat theme song".

== Discography ==
=== Albums ===
- Mortal Kombat: The Album (1994)
- Mortal Kombat (soundtrack) (1995)
- Mortal Kombat: Annihilation (soundtrack) (1997)

=== Singles ===
List of singles, with selected chart positions
| Title | Year | Peak chart positions | Album |
| Title | Year | AUS | Album |
|---|---|---|---|
| "Mortal Kombat" | 1993 | 55 | Mortal Kombat: The Album |
| "Sonya (Go Go Go)" | 1994 | — | |
