= Teknowhore =

TeknoWhore

Studio album by Bile
- Released: 18 June 1996
- Recorded: Summer–fall 1995
- Studio: Music Palace, Long Island, New York
- Genre: Industrial metal
- Length: 66:55
- Label: Energy Records
- Producer: Slave and Krztoff

Bile chronology
SuckPump (1994)	TeknoWhore (1996)	The Darkbeat EP (1996)

Professional ratings
Review scores
Source	Rating
AllMusic	4/5 stars
Chronicles of Chaos	2/10
The Encyclopedia of Popular Music	3/5 stars

TeknoWhore is a studio album by the American industrial metal band Bile, released in 1996. The album was released on the now defunct Energy Records and had not been reproduced since the company's fold in 2000. After being out of print for three years, Bile decided to re-release the album alongside their out-of-print first release, Suckpump, as a digipak titled Frankenhole in 2003. TeknoWhore was written and recorded by Krztoff, produced by Krztoff and Slave, mixed by Slave, and engineered by Steve Spaperri and Patrick Gordon.

== Critical reception ==
The Washington Post wrote that "the band's world view is as contrived and perverse as its style, which alternates slamming synthbeats with aimless interludes of burbling music and ironic samples from old movies and documentaries."

== Track listing ==
1. "Intro" - 2:09
2. "Teknowhore" - 2:08
3. "Weather Control" - 4:38
4. "No One I Call Friend" - 6:28
5. "Habitual Sphere" - 4:38
6. "Compound Pressure" - 5:14
7. "Interstate Hate Song" - 3:35
8. "Green Day" - 1:12
9. "No I Don't Know" - 2:31
10. "Suckers" - 2:18
11. "Lowest Form" - 4:54
12. "You Can't Love This (Pt. 1)" - 1:00
13. "You Can't Love This (Pt. 2)" - 6:08
14. "You Can't Love This (Pt. 3)" - 3:21
15. "You Can't Love This (Pt. 4)" - 6:26
16. "Solitude Is Bliss" - 10:15

== Credits ==
Bile in the studio

- Krztoff - Lead vocals, guitarz, bass, sitar, drums, distortions, atmospheres, Kawai K-1, samples, porno, programming, Zoom FX, pedals, Roland W-30, line input overdrives.
- Slave - a.k.a. David Stagnari - Programming, EMS-Synthi, RFB-40 shortwave, Roland Juno-106, Korg Mono/Poly, Oberheim Matrix-6, samples, loops, treatments.
- Brett and Archie A.K. did backup vox on "Teknowhore" and "No I Don't Know."
- Omen spewed 'emu omenfuck' backgrounds on "You Can't Love This."

Bile on the road

- Krztoff - Lead vox, guitarz, programs
- Brett Pirozzi - Vox, bass, guitar
- R.H. Bear - Keyboards, bass and video
- Slave - Keyboards, EMS Synthi, programs
- Darrell - Lightning and effects

No Live freakshow

- Produced by Slave and Krztoff
- Mixed by Slave
- Recorded in Music Palace, Long Island, N.Y., Summer-Fall 1995
- Engineered by Steve "Potso" Spaperri and Patrick Gordon
- 1/2in. tape editor - Slave
- Album arrangement, sequence and interludes by Krztoff and Slave
