= Robin Shou =

Hong Kong-American actor, martial artist and stuntman

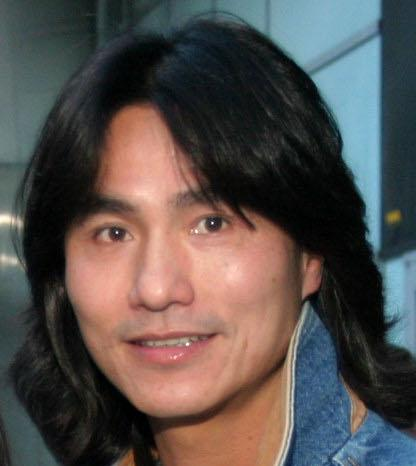
- Shou in 2004
- Born: Shou Wan-por (仇雲波); British Hong Kong
- Other names: Wai Lung (威龍, his Cantonese screen name during his Hong Kong acting career. His screen name means "mighty/powerful dragon".)
- Education: California State University, Los Angeles
- Occupations: Martial artist; actor
- Years active: 1987–2015
- Style: Kenpo, Wu Shu, Shotokan Karate, Kung Fu

Shou Wan-por (Chinese: 仇雲波), known professionally as Robin Shou, is a retired Hong Kong-American actor, martial artist and stuntman. He is known for roles such as Liu Kang in the Mortal Kombat film series (1995 and 1997), Gobei in Beverly Hills Ninja (1997), Gen in Street Fighter: The Legend of Chun-Li (2009), and 14K in the Death Race films (2008-2013). Shou was also a Hong Kong action star in the late 1980s and early 1990s. He had appeared in about 40 movies during his Hong Kong career, before he entered Hollywood in 1994. Prior to his acting career, Shou won several championships as a martial artist.

== Biography ==
Shou's interest in martial arts developed during his years as a University student. He began practising wushu after watching Jet Li's film Shaolin Temple. He soon became a Hong Kong stuntman.

As a martial artist, Shou was an International Forms Champion in 1982 and 1983 and he won several gold and silver medals at prestigious competitions in China. He was also a traditional forms Grand Champion in California.

Shou's first dramatic role was in Forbidden Nights in 1990, with Melissa Gilbert. Though only a TV film, this was his American debut. However, Shou went back to Hong Kong and continued making movies there such as Tiger Cage 2 and Fatal Termination. In 1994, Shou returned to Los Angeles when he landed his first American leading role as Liu Kang in Mortal Kombat (1995), based on the popular video game of the same name. He reprised the role in the 1997 sequel Mortal Kombat Annihilation. That same year, he appeared opposite Chris Farley in the action comedy Beverly Hills Ninja.

Shou also appeared in a minor role in another fighting video game adaptation, DOA: Dead or Alive, based on Tecmo's video game series of the same name, produced by Mortal Kombat director Paul W. S. Anderson and producer Jeremy Bolt. He played 14K in the Death Race series, and also appeared as Gen in 2009's Street Fighter: The Legend of Chun-Li. Shou trained Milla Jovovich for her role in Resident Evil.

He is fluent in English in addition to his native Chinese.

== Filmography ==
=== Film ===
Year	Title	Role	Notes
1987	The Big Brother	Robin	—N/a
1988	City War	Killer	—N/a
1989	Death Cage	Lan-si Han	—N/a
1990	Tiger Cage 2	Waise Chow	as Robin Chou
1990	Fatal Termination	Wai Loong	—N/a
1991	Eastern Heroes	Hawk	—N/a
1992	Interpol Connection	—N/a	—N/a
1992	Magdaleno Orbos: Sa Kuko ng Mga Lawin	—N/a	—N/a
1992	Black Cat II	Robin	—N/a
1993	Bloody Mary Killer		—N/a
1993	Honor and Glory	Dragon Lee	—N/a
1994	The Most Wanted	Gang leader	—N/a
1995	Mortal Kombat	Liu Kang	Shou's Hollywood big screen debut and his second American movie
1997	Mortal Kombat Annihilation	Liu Kang	—N/a
1997	Beverly Hills Ninja	Gobei	—N/a
2003	Red Trousers - The Life of the Hong Kong Stuntmen	Evan; Narrator; Himself	Director
2006	18 Fingers of Death!	Jackie Chong	—N/a
2006	DOA: Dead or Alive	Pirate Senior	—N/a
2008	Death Race	14K	—N/a
2009	Street Fighter: The Legend of Chun-Li	Gen	—N/a
2010	Death Race 2	14K	—N/a
2011	Mortal Enemies	Sunny	—N/a
2013	Death Race 3: Inferno	14K	—N/a
2014	Black Tiger: Hunter Hunted	Pacific "Pac" Fong / Black Tiger	Short film
2015	Earthbound		Short film, director

=== Television ===
Year	Title	Role	Notes
1990	Yellowthread Street	Tony Siu	Episode: "The Red Pole"
1990	Forbidden Nights	Liang Heng	Television film
1992	Soldier Soldier	Journalist Feng	Episode: "Lost and Found"
1998	The Outer Limits	Major Ronald Neguchi	Episode: "Nightmare"
2009	Cold Case	Bo-Lin Chen (1983)	Episode: "Chinatown"
2015	Way of the Empty Hand	Boss	Television film,

=== Video games ===
Year	Title	Role	Notes
2012	Sleeping Dogs	Conroy Wu / Roland Ho	Voice
