= Bile (band) =

American industrial metal band

- Origin: New York City, U.S.
- Genres: Industrial metal, industrial rock
- Years active: 1992–present
- Labels: Energy Records (1994–2000); Bile Style (2000–present)
- Members: Krztoff; R.H. Bear; Dave Sussman; John "SERVO" Disalvo; Brett Frana
- Past members: live: Lacey Connor; Archie A.K. Kris Kemp; Rick Furr; Jaymz Alexander; Von Vinhasa; Brendin Ross; Bobabuse; Kirk 'Slash' Farrington; Brett Pirozzi; Eric Roi; Jeff-X; Sin-Dee Sex; Slave a.k.a. David Stagnari; Brett Frana; SerVo; Dave Sussman

Bile is an American industrial metal project based in New York City. Although there have been many different members throughout the band's career, Krztoff is the songwriting, recording and conceptual leader. The group has performed with as many as 11, and as few as two people on stage. The early shows in 1993–95 New York included a dominatrix and fire-breather.

== History ==
Beginning in 1992 Bile began as an art project. The band became a top-drawing New York City live spectacle, which led to them signing with a New York-based indie record label and releasing three albums on Energy Records, including their debut, Suckpump, Teknowhore and Biledegradable. Following tours with Gwar, 16 Volt, and numerous lineup changes, the band grew dissatisfied with Energy Records and negotiated his way off the label, inciting Krztoff and R.H. Bear (Krztoff's longtime friend and bandmate) to regroup and record for their own label, Bile Style Records. Krztoff recorded Sex Reflex. The album features their most popular song to date, "In League". Their song, "I Reject" appeared on the 1995 Mortal Kombat soundtrack. Their song "In League" appeared on the soundtrack to the 1998 Dee Snider film Strangeland. Krztoff went on to join Pigface as guitarist in 2001. With help from Martin Atkins' distribution conduit, Bile Style Records then released Nightmare Before Krztoff, Black From The Dead, Demonic Electronic, The Copy Machine, Frankenhole and Regurge" The Best o' Bile.

Krztoff coined the phrase "Demonic Electronic" to best describe their sound and live show.

Bile has played and toured the U.S. extensively with artists such as Pigface, KMFDM, Korn, Marilyn Manson, Ohgr, Gwar, Misfits, and Rammstein.

When performing live, Bile consists of Krztoff (vocals, lead guitar), R.H. Bear (bass, effects), Dave Sussman (guitar), former KMFDM John "SERVO" Disalvo (drums), former My Life With The Thrill Kill Kult, Brett Frana (keyboardist).

In 2013, Bile digitally released the album Built to Fuck, Born to Kill and in 2020 Sharks & Covid music sampler exclusively on YouTube

== Discography ==
- Suckpump (1994)
- Teknowhore (1996)
- The Darkbeat (EP, 1996)
- Biledegradable (1997)
- Sex Reflex (2000)
- Nightmare Before Krztoff (2000)
- Demonic Electronic (2002)
- The Copy Machine (2002)
- Frankenhole (2003)
- Regurge: A Bucket of Bile, Best of Bile (2004)
- Hate Radio (2009)
- Built to Fuck, Born to Kill (2013)
- Sharks and Covid, Vol. 1 (EP, 2021)
- Pot Farmer, Vol. 2 (2022)
