= Between the 1 and the 9 =

Studio album by Patti Rothberg
- Released: April 2, 1996
- Studio: Electric Lady, New York City
- Length: 41:45
- Label: EMI
- Producer: Little Dave Greenberg

Patti Rothberg chronology
Between the 1 and the 9 (1996)	Candelabra Cadabra (2001)

Between the 1 and the 9 is the debut album by the American musician Patti Rothberg, released in 1996. Compared to Alanis Morissette and other female singers of the mid-1990s, Rothberg disdained the "T. F. S., tortured female syndrome" label. The album title refers to the New York City subway stop where Rothberg used to busk. The album artwork was painted by Rothberg.

Between the 1 and the 9 peaked at No. 83 on the UK Albums Chart. The first single was "Inside", which was a minor alternative rock radio hit. Rothberg promoted the album by touring with Primitive Radio Gods, among others.

== Production ==
The album was produced by Little Dave Greenberg. The songs were written by Rothberg, many during her time in Paris, in 1992 and 1993; she also played all the guitar and bass parts. Between the 1 and the 9 contains an unlisted track, which shares the same title as the album.

== Critical reception ==
Professional ratings
Review scores
Source	Rating
AllMusic	4/5 stars
The Encyclopedia of Popular Music	3/5 stars
The Indianapolis Star	3.5/4 stars
Knoxville News Sentinel	3/5 stars
Los Angeles Times	2/4 stars
MusicHound Rock: The Essential Album Guide	4/5 stars
Spin	6/10
USA Today	3/4 stars
Vancouver Sun	3/4 stars

Entertainment Weekly praised the "well-crafted songs and an appealingly grainy voice—think of a distaff Dylan." Spin wrote that, "even when has the pedal to the metal ... she keeps her focus squarely on the words." The Sun-Sentinel determined: "Not as angry as Alanis Morissette or as immature as Juliana Hatfield, Rothberg reaches for more understanding while trying to have more fun." The Los Angeles Times opined that "there's a precocious intelligence to her raspy, sardonic vocals, and her scrupulously lean arrangements are full of tender and funky flourishes."

The Washington Post noted that "'Perfect Stranger' proves her lyrics can be perceptive as well as pointed, and several songs are disarmingly catchy." The Palm Beach Post stated that Rotheberg's "sandpaper voice, bad-boyfriend lyrics and folk and electric blues numbers have a sharp, confessional ring." The Record concluded that Rothberg's "anger and occasional bitterness are conveyed by a sweet, grainy voice sitting atop inviting melodic music that draws from rock, folk, country, and blues and deftly blends acoustic and electric guitars." The Dayton Daily News listed the album among the 10 best of 1996.

AllMusic wrote: "Strongly rooted in the singer/songwriter aesthetic of one woman and her guitar, the songs on Between the 1 and the 9 are fleshed out a bit with other instruments but retain their edge."

== Track listing ==
No.	Title	Length
1.	"Flicker"
2.	"Inside"
3.	"This One's Mine"
4.	"Treat Me Like Dirt"
5.	"Looking for a Girl"
6.	"Forgive Me"
7.	"Up Against the Wall"
8.	"Perfect Stranger"
9.	"Out of My Mind"
10.	"Change Your Ways"
11.	"Remembering Tonight"
12.	"It's Alright"
