= George S. Clinton =

George Stanley Clinton
- Genre: Film rock
- Occupations: Film composer, songwriter, session musician
- Years active: 1980–present

George Stanley Clinton Jr. (born 17 June 1947) is an American composer, songwriter, arranger, and session musician.

== Biography ==
Clinton Jr was born on 17 June 1947 in Chattanooga, Tennessee. His musical career began in Nashville while attaining degrees in both music and drama at Middle Tennessee State University. After graduation, Clinton moved to Los Angeles and became a staff writer for Warner Brothers Music, while arranging and performing session work. He later recorded four albums for MCA, Elektra Records, ABC, and Arista Records.

The George Clinton Band attracted the attention of a movie producer, giving Clinton the opportunity to score his first film, Cheech and Chong's Still Smokin', and later, Cheech and Chong's The Corsican Brothers.

Clinton's most recognizable scores include Austin Powers: International Man of Mystery (and its sequels); the martial arts fantasy Mortal Kombat, and its sequel Mortal Kombat Annihilation; and Showtime's series Red Shoe Diaries. His awards include a 2002 Grammy nomination, a 2007 Emmy nomination, and eight BMI Film Music Awards. He was honored with the Richard Kirk Award at the 2007 BMI Film and TV Awards. The award is given annually to a composer who has made significant contributions to film and television music.

Clinton has also written several concert works and three musicals. He serves as an adviser at the Sundance Institute and used to be the Chair of the Film Scoring Department at Berklee College of Music in Boston.

== Awards ==
- 1996: Mortal Kombat (BMI Film Music Award)
- 1999: Wild Things (Saturn Award)
- 2000: Austin Powers: The Spy Who Shagged Me (BMI Film Music Award)
- 2003: Austin Powers in Goldmember (BMI Film Music Award)
- 2003: The Santa Clause 2 (BMI Film Music Award)
- 2003: Undercover Brother (Black Reel Awards)
- 2005: The 4400 (BMI Cable Award)
- 2006: Big Momma's House 2 (BMI Film Music Award)
- 2007: The Santa Clause 3: The Escape Clause (BMI Film Music Award)
- 2010: Tooth Fairy (BMI Film Music Award)
- 2018: Austin Powers: International Man of Mystery (20/20 Awards)
