= Tony Isbert =

- Born: 5 December 1950; Madrid, Spain
- Died: 19 February 2025 (aged 74); Santander, Spain
- Occupation: Actor
- Mother: María Isbert
- Relatives: José Isbert (grandfather)

Tony Isbert (5 December 1950–19 February 2025) was a Spanish film, television, and stage actor.

== Biography ==
Isbert was born in Madrid to actors José and María Isbert (née Ysbert Soriano). His maternal grandfather was José Isbert, also an actor. The Isbert family included numerous actors, with origins in Tarazona de la Mancha.

Isbert appeared in numerous Spanish and Italian films between the 1970s and 1990s, including roles in Tragic Ceremony (1972), Red Rings of Fear (1978), Christina (1984), Rest in Pieces (1987), and The Rift (1990). He was also a prolific stage actor in Spain, including a lead role in a Madrid revival of Twelve Angry Men.

He died of respiratory failure at his home in Santander, Spain on 19 February 2025, with th direct cause of death being pneumothorax. He had been hospitalized the week prior to his death for respiratory issues.

== Selected filmography ==
=== Film ===
Year	Title	Role	Notes	Ref.
1972	The House Without Frontiers	Daniel Márquez		
1972	Tragic Ceremony	Bill		
1973	The Dracula Saga			
1973	No One Heard the Scream	Tony		
1976	Inquisition	Pierre Burgot		
1978	Red Rings of Fear	Professor Max van der Weyden		
1980	La amante ingenua	Basil		
1984	Christina	Max		
1986	Pasos Largos: El último bandido andaluz	Pasos Largos		
1987	Rest in Pieces	Louis		
1988	Fist Fighter	Rains		
1989	Fine Gold	Carlos		
1990	The Rift	Roger Fleming		
1999	The City of Marvels	Odón Mostaza		
2012	Mediterranean Blue	Noruego		

=== Television ===
Year	Title	Role	Notes	Ref.
1972	Estudio 1	Romeo	3 episodes	
1984	Teresa de Jesús	Jerónimo Gracián	Miniseries	
1984	Proceso a Mariana Pineda	Ferrer	Miniseries	
1990	Zorro	Arturo/Bandit	3 episodes	
2011	Witches from heaven		1 episode	

== Sources ==
- Curti, Roberto (2017). Italian Gothic Horror Films, 1970-1979. Jefferson, North Carolina: McFarland & Company. ISBN 978-1476-66469-9.
- Lazaro-Reboll, Antonio (2012). Spanish Horror Film. Edinburgh, Scotland: Edinburgh University Press. ISBN 978-0-748-63640-2.
