= Mortal Kombat: Conquest =

American syndicated TV series (1998–1999)

- Based on: Mortal Kombat by: Ed Boon; John Tobias
- Developed by: Juan Carlos Coto
- Starring: Paolo Montalban; Daniel Bernhardt; Kristanna Loken; Tracy Douglas; Bruce Locke; Jeffrey Meek
- Narrated by: Kevin Michael Richardson (Opening titles only)
- Composer: Jonathan Sloate
- Country of origin: United States
- No. of seasons: 1
- No. of episodes: 22

Production
- Executive producers: Lawrence Kasanoff; Robert Friedman; Tom Campbell
- Running time: 43 minutes
- Production companies: Threshold Entertainment; New Line Television

Original release
- Network: Syndication
- Release: October 3, 1998 – May 22, 1999

Mortal Kombat: Conquest is an American martial arts television series developed by Juan Carlos Coto, based on the fighting video game series Mortal Kombat. The series was produced by Threshold Entertainment and New Line Television and aired in syndication for one season from October 3, 1998 to May 22, 1999.

The series serves as a prequel to the games, following the original Kung Lao (Paolo Montalban) as he protects Earthrealm with the help of bodyguard Siro (Daniel Bernhardt) and former thief Taja (Kristanna Loken). It was one of the first live action shows based on a video game to air on United States television, preceded only by the live action segments of The Super Mario Bros. Super Show! It also shared similarities with Mighty Morphin Power Rangers.

== Summary ==
Many centuries ago, Earth was an enchanting and desirable planet. Powerful and rich with natural resources, the vicious megalomaniac Shao Kahn wanted Earth as part of his growing collection of conquered realms known as Outworld. To protect Earth, Mortal Kombat was created: a tournament in which the fate of the planet is decided in battles between competitors from Earthrealm and Outworld. Five hundred years in the past, the monk warrior Kung Lao defeated Shao Kahn's sorcerer, Shang Tsung. When Kung Lao spared his life, Shao imprisoned Shang in the cobalt mines.

Kung Lao now had to train the next generation of warriors, who would give their lives to save Earth. Kung Lao created a partnership and friendship between two warriors: Siro, a former bodyguard, and Taja, an ex-thief. In the mysterious city of Zhuzin, Kung Lao and his new friends are guided and watched over by the thunder god Raiden. The three now battle various evils of both Outworld and Earthrealm, including an imprisoned Shang Tsung, who swore eternal revenge on Kung Lao for his humiliating defeat, and the sultry and seductive Vorpax, who is also imprisoned in the mines and has an agenda of her own.

== Cast ==
=== Main ===
- Paolo Montalban as Kung Lao
- Daniel Bernhardt as Siro
- Kristanna Loken as Taja
- Tracy Douglas as Vorpax
- Bruce Locke as Shang Tsung
- Jeffrey Meek as Raiden and Shao Kahn

=== Recurring ===
- John Reilly as Baron Reyland
- Jennifer Renton as Geneviere "Jen" Reyland
- Angelica Bridges as Omegis
- Sung Hi Lee as Kiri
- Tahitia Hicks as Ankha
- Dana Hee as Siann
- Lena Cardwell as Lamera
- Jaime Pressly as Mika
- Renee Tenison as Sora
- Fabiana Udenio as Kreeya
- Roshumba Williams as Qali
- Eva Mendes as Hanna
- Andreea Radutoiu as Jola
- Alexander Walters as Tomas
- Alana de la Garza as Ella
- Greg Vaughan as Kebral
- Josie Davis as Peron
- Kathleen Kinmont as Dion

=== Game characters ===
- Chris Casamassa as Scorpion
- J.J. Perry as Sub-Zero
- Audie England and Dara Tomanovich as Kitana
- Sultan Uddin as Noob Saibot
- Adoni Maropis as Quan Chi
- Megan Brown as Mileena
- Percy "Spitfire" Brown as Rain
- Jim Helsinger as Reiko
- Jon Valera as Reptile
- Robin Thomas as Shinnok
- Paula Leggett Chase as Sindel
- Cory Everson as Sheeva
- Matthias Hues as Fujin

=== Notable guest appearances ===
With Conquest immediately following TNT's top-rated program, WCW Monday Nitro, WCW wrestlers Meng and Wrath filmed separate appearances. Former QVC model Dorian John played the barmaid Magda in the episodes "Twisted Truth" and "Quan Chi".

== Production and release ==
Mortal Kombat: Conquest was produced by Threshold Entertainment (who produced the Mortal Kombat film series) in association with New Line Television (television arm of the films' distributor). Warner Bros. Domestic Television Distribution distributed the series. The program was filmed at Disney-MGM Studios in Orlando, Florida. The Warner Bros. unit (eventual holder of the Mortal Kombat property), as New Line's corporate sibling-turned-parent, syndicated the series until it was later picked up by TNT, which aired the remaining new episodes in addition to broadcasting repeats of the first-run syndication run. With a lucrative timeslot following WCW Monday Nitro, Conquest was very popular, but according to the show's developer, Joshua Wexler, this resulted in higher budget costs for the show than anticipated. The cancellation was not announced at first, and rumors of a second season circulated. However, TNT pulled the plug on the show, leaving it with a cliffhanger ending. The ending was planned to have been resolved in the second season, which would have summed up the series and corresponded with the MK timeline.

== Episodes ==
No.	Title	Directed by	Written by	Original release date	Prod. code
1	"Warrior Eternal, Part 1"	Oley Sassone	Juan Carlos Coto	October 3, 1998	1
After defeating Shang Tsung in Mortal Kombat, Kung Lao must learn that victory is not the end but only the beginning.
2	"Warrior Eternal, Part 2"	Oley Sassone	Juan Carlos Coto	October 10, 1998	2
After barely managing to escape execution, Kung Lao rushes with Siro and Taja to save his love from a new deadly enemy: Scorpion.
3	"Cold Reality"	Doug Lefler	Steve Hattman	October 17, 1998	3
Kung Lao and his friends find themselves attacked by the Lin Kuei and their most powerful fighter, Sub-Zero.
4	"Immortal Kombat"	Scott Paulin	Sean Catherine Derek	October 24, 1998	4
Due to Shang Tsung's sorcery, Siro and Taja are rapidly aging and it's up to Kung Lao not only to find a cure for them, but also fight the sorcerer. When he gets to the forest, he meets Omegis, an immortal sorceress who has what he is looking for, but at first she will not let him return. When he goes back to the aged Siro and Taja, he fights Shang Tsung, which incurs the wrath of Raiden, when Kung Lao waives the sacred rules.
5	"The Essence"	Jim Johnston	Sean Catherine Derek	October 31, 1998	5
Kung Lao meets the mysterious Princess Kitana of Edenia, who comes to Earthrealm in search of the Essence of her realm, but both Shao Kahn and Shang Tsung respectively, dispatched their warriors, Vorpax representing Shang Tsung and Qali, Kitana's old friend, now turned enemy representing Shao Kahn, to destroy the Essence. It is up to Kung Lao, Siro and Taja to help Kitana protect the Essence and thwart their insidious agenda.
6	"Noob Saibot"	Charles Siebert	William Thomas Quick	November 7, 1998	6
Siro and Taja meet a seer named Kiri, who tells them of an underworld city with a shrine guarded by two powerful warriors. Kiri says they will grow stronger if they defeat these warriors, but she really hopes they will release Noob Saibot to kill Kung Lao.
7	"Debt of the Dragon"	Jim Johnston	Sean Catherine Derek	November 14, 1998	7
The Black Dragon, an infamous underworld organization, have appeared in Zhu Zin. They claim ownership of the trading post and demand Kung Lao, Siro and Taja leave. While they resisted the Black Dragon, a member named Jola makes a deal with Shang Tsung for power and revenge. He gives her the powers of the black dragon, but she abuses her new-found flame-throwing powers out of arrogance and nearly dies. Shang sends her back to the mines, where she is to remain forever.
8	"Undying Dream"	Rick Jacobson	Carl Ellsworth	November 21, 1998	8
Taja is pulled into a portal and arrives in the Cobalt Mines, captured by Shang Tsung, after being caught under an illusion of seeing her dead father. Kung Lao and Siro have to save her, even if it means walking into a trap.
9	"Quan Chi"	Bruce Seth Green	Steve Hattman	November 28, 1998	9
Quan Chi sends a trio of women to infect Kung Lao, Taja and Siro with a potion. The potion magnifies their flaws: Kung Lao is consumed by rage in an attempt to be dishonored, Siro becomes a drunkard, and Taja returns to thievery. With the three getting out of control, Raiden has to find a way to break this spell before it's too late.
10	"Unholy Alliance"	Charles T. Kanganis	Story by : Kearie Peak; Written by : Sean Catherine Derek	December 5, 1998	10
Shang Tsung forms an unlikely alliance with Quan Chi to defeat Kung Lao; they agree that if Shang Tsung can lure Kung Lao into a trap of their creation, Shang Tsung must not only teach Quan Chi how to steal souls, but Quan Chi would own his soul. They lure Kung Lao into a realm created by them both, with everything he could possibly want. But it's all an elaborate trap for Shang Tsung to capture him and leave the Earthrealm defenseless. In a side-story, Taja makes a bet with Siro - a day of slave labor if she can take him down in one move.
11	"Thicker Than Blood"	Reza Badiyi	Sean Catherine Derek	December 12, 1998	11
An old love from Siro's past, Hannah, turns up in Zhu Zin in search of his help. Hannah reveals she married Siro's estranged brother, Cassar, who has gone missing. Siro is reluctant to help until he learns Scorpion used magic to make Cassar one of his warriors.
12	"Shadow of a Doubt"	Peter Ellis	Nancy Greene, Steve Hattman & Sean Catherine Derek (teleplay)	February 6, 1999	12
Kung Lao is badly wounded in a fight with Rain. With him practically defenseless, Shao Kahn sends Mileena to masquerade as Princess Kitana and finish off the weakened Kung Lao, but Shang Tsung and Vorpax overhearing his plans, hatched a scheme via alerting Kitana in an attempt to expose Mileena and save his enemy from death, so that until he plots a way till the next tournament, he would be the one to claim Kung Lao's soul. However, after taking too much time, Kahn punishes his "new daughter" with lengthening her front teeth and being given a mask to hide her true hideousness.
13	"Twisted Truths"	Chip Chalmers	Steve Hattman & Sean Catherine Derek	February 13, 1999	13
A warrior named Tomas arrives, saying he wants to join Kung Lao in defending Earthrealm. All seems well until it looks like Tomas has murdered some barmaids. Has he? Or was there something bigger going on?
14	"Festival of Death"	Charles Siebert	James Cappe	February 20, 1999	14
A traveling circus arrives in Zhu Zin with Qali among it. Kung Lao, Taja and Siro suspect something is wrong and they're right. The circus turns out to be a way for Quan Chi to raise an army.
15	"The Serpent and the Ice"	Jack Sholder	Steve Hattman & Sean Catherine Derek	February 27, 1999	15
Shao Kahn partners two bitter enemies, Sub-Zero and Scorpion, to destroy Kung Lao only for their hatred to intensify as Kung Lao, Siro, and Taja try to find out which one of Sub-Zero's families is really Sub-Zero's in an attempt to protect them from Scorpion and his army and figure out a way to exploit their own weaknesses.
16	"Kreeya"	Bruce Seth Green	Sean Catherine Derek James Cappe & Robert Rabinowitz	March 6, 1999	16
Empress Kreeya arrives on Earthrealm to build up an army. Her target: Outworld. Vorpax, revealed to be working for Kreeya, invites Kung Lao, Taja and Siro to join them.
17	"The Master"	Harvey S. Laidman	James Cappe	April 17, 1999	17
Long ago, Master Cho was betrayed by Shang Tsung so he could fight for Shao Kahn. With Shang Tsung presently loose on Earthrealm, Master Cho intends to settle the score.
18	"In Kold Blood"	Reza Badiyi	James Cappe	April 24, 1999	18
Kreeya has returned and is now teamed up with Reptile.
19	"Flawed Victory"	Charles Siebert	Steve Hattman & Sean Catherine Derek	May 1, 1999	19
Shao Kahn enlists Quan Chi to find the missing Shang Tsung and return him to the Cobalt Mines. Shang disguises himself as Quan Chi and tries to kill the emperor with the intention to make him look like a traitor.
20	"Balance of Power"	Scott Paulin	Duke Sandefur	May 8, 1999	21
As Shao Kahn furiously seeks his traitor (Reptile), the balance of power is menacingly shifting putting everyone on Earthrealm and Outworld in danger. Vorpax convinces Kung Lao and his friends to help her kill Kreeya.
21	"Stolen Lies"	Reza Badiyi	Sean Catherine Derek & James Cappe	May 15, 1999	20
Taja's old friend Dion suddenly makes an appearance at the trading post in search of a mysterious city called Shakaana, which holds a deadly secret. The people of the city worship a "god" they call Shaaka and believe they will receive salvation in a place they call "Far-land".
22	"Vengeance"	Reza Badiyi	Steve Hattman	May 22, 1999	22
Shao Kahn unleashes his fury against all his enemies, real or imaginary, and Raiden is the only one who can stop him. Kung Lao and those who betrayed the emperor are all put on the defensive by Shao Kahn's assassins. Furious, Raiden attacks and battles Shao Kahn to try to save Earthrealm from the forces of Outworld.

== Home media ==
Mortal Kombat: Conquest has been released on DVD in the United Kingdom and Australia, where it enjoyed a more successful run on television. Unofficial collections produced in the UK consist of unrelated and edited episodes merged so that each disc contains a theme, and some of the DVDs contain spelling errors on the covers. Several episodes of the series, consisting of one show per disc, were released in Germany; two of the discs feature episodes centered around Kreeya and Sub-Zero. DVDs were also recently released in Portugal, with many spelling errors on the covers. In 2015, Warner Home Video released Mortal Kombat: Conquest - Season One on DVD in Region 1 for the very first time.

== Reception ==
In 2010, 4thletter! ranked Conquest as sixth on the list of "The Top Ten Most Ridiculous Things to Come Out of Mortal Kombat". In 2011, 1UP.com featured the series in the article "The Top Ten Times Mortal Kombat Went Wrong", calling it a "wire-fu disaster".
