= Hero Factory (TV series) =

TV series

- Genre: Action; Science fantasy
- Written by: Sean Catherine Derek; Jesse Peyronel; Adam Beechen
- Directed by: Mark Baldo; Howard E. Baker; Michael D. Black; Jay Oliva; Jorgen Klubien
- Voices of: John Schneider; Eric Christian Olsen; Henry Winkler; Bryton James; Jean Louisa Kelly; Christopher B. Duncan; Stephen Stanton; Jason Canning; Tom Kenny; Jason London; Jennifer Coolidge; Malcolm McDowell
- Composers: David Wurst; Eric Wurst
- Countries of origin: United States; Denmark; China
- Original languages: English; Chinese
- No. of episodes: 11

Production
- Executive producers: Jill Wilfret; Jan Faltum; Kathleen Fleming; Lawrence Kasanoff; Jimmy Ienner
- Producers: Joshua R. Wexlar; Kristy Scanlan
- Running time: 23 minutes
- Production companies: Threshold Animation Studios; Lego Group; Geely

Original release
- Network: Nicktoons
- Release: September 20, 2010 – January 9, 2014

Hero Factory is an animated television series based on the Lego toy series of the same name and produced by Threshold Animation Studios for The Lego Group and Geely. The series revolves around the Hero Factory, a crime-fighting organization that manufacture robotic heroes to fight and apprehend criminals across the galaxy and protect a similarly robotic populace. The main characters are a group of heroes that make up Team Alpha 1, the Hero Factory's most successful and praised team.

The series originally premiered as a four-part mini-series on September 20, 2010, on Nicktoons; further episodes followed as the theme continued as a toy line until its discontinuation in 2014.

== Overview ==
Hero Factory revolves around the fictional organization of the same name that manufactures robots known as Heroes and trains them to capture criminals and protect a similarly robotic populace, thereby maintaining order across the galaxy. Each Hero is unique, with their own distinct personalities and equipment, and the Heroes are arranged into teams. Hero Factory's headquarters are based in a towering skyscraper centred in the fictional Makuhero City on an asteroid-like planet.

The series centers on the missions and Heroes of the Alpha 1 Team, the most praised and experienced team at the Hero Factory. Led by veteran Hero Preston Stormer, the team comprises senior members Dunkan Bulk and Jimi Stringer, original rookies and later fully fledged teammates William Furno, Mark Surge and Natalie Breez, and new rookies Julius Nex, Nathan Evo and Daniel Rocka. All Heroes refer to each other by their last name.

From the episode "Ordeal of Fire" onward, the Heroes are upgraded into new "2.0" forms as part of a new Hero building system. The forms became the basis for subsequent upgrades; Heroes would be provided with new armor, weapons and gadgets for the mission at hand based on the environment they would have to enter or the lethalness of a villain.

== Characters ==
=== Heroes ===
- Preston Stormer is the no-nonsense leader of Alpha 1, plagued by his failure in a past mission, and demanding in his expectations of all team members. A skilled Hero, Stormer has experienced hundreds of battles, and is a natural leader. He is very competitive, and specifically targeted the post of Alpha 1 leader because he believed he would excel in it. After the incident with Von Ness, Stormer is determined that no rookie would ever put a mission in jeopardy again and is especially harsh on them as a result; many prior rookies under his command either gave up or were transferred out. The incident also plagued him with feelings of guilt, and he often blames himself for things that go wrong with missions. Stormer is disinterested in popularity and believes that he should not receive praise for simply doing his job. Stormer is one of the main protagonists of the series.
- Dunkan Bulk is a physically imposing, powerful senior Alpha 1 member. Bulk's artificial intelligence is less developed than others, which he sometimes feels self-conscious about, but he makes up for this intelligence deficiency with sheer power. He is able to withstand blows that would destroy armored vehicles. He is reputed to be one of the Hero Factory's strongest active Heroes. Bulk is always ready for a mission, and enjoys fighting for the Hero Factory as much as he enjoys the actual fighting itself. He has been actively working to develop his intelligence, increasing his amount of reading and vocabulary.
- Jimi Stringer is a philosophical and musically inclined veteran of Alpha 1, who incorporates sound-based functions into his weaponry. Stringer enjoys fighting for the Hero Factory cause, but is very laid-back, and cool under pressure during missions. This attitude occasionally annoys his teammates, but helps him in dealing with the stressful situations they get into. Unlike the other members of the Alpha 1 Team, Stringer likes working with rookie Heroes. He has a passion for music, and applies his casual, philosophical attitude about fighting toward lyric composition as well.
- William Furno was once a reckless and ambitious, handsome rookie Hero assigned to Alpha 1, now a valuable team member. As a rookie, Furno was impatient but passionate, and eager to prove himself, especially to team leader Stormer. He was also overconfident, and believed he had the skill to succeed at any task. This self-confidence forced him to push his own limits in order to succeed at harder tasks, even during his downtime. Time and missions have tempered his overconfidence, though he is still very eager. His attitude brought him into conflict with the similarly headstrong new rookie on the team Rocka, who was modeled after Furno himself, though Furno grew to accept the rookie. He had also attempted to cultivate leadership qualities, offering his tutelage to rookie Nathan Evo. He is promoted to the rank of team commander in the "Brain Attack" episode, and put in charge of multiple Hero teams, including Alpha 1 during their against the Brain in Makuhero City. His model, at the time of creation, was the newest and most up-to-date one available. His Hero Core is thought to be the purest in existence. Furno is one of the main protagonists of the series.
- Mark Surge is one of Team Alpha 1's youngest, a temperamental hot-head working to overcome a secret insecurity. Though he is convinced that something went wrong with his construction, Surge is nonetheless an able, if occasionally clumsy, Hero. Like his fellow rookie teammates, he was built with experimental designs, but resented the constant examination this required. He is known to be defiant and emotional, often attempting to be rational, but is easily set off. He is also very strong, but his inexperience leads to an inability to use it properly all the time. He thoroughly enjoys going on action-oriented missions, rarely content to be involved with community affairs. Surge also struggles with fears that he is secretly evil and will become a villain, like Von Nebula. Although he has dealt with this fear directly over the course of his Hero career, Surge still deals with the insecurity, and often throws himself into action to compensate.
- Natalie Breez is the sole female member of Alpha 1. Brash in her dealings with her teammates, but with a connection to nature. Breez has a talent for remaining cool and collected under pressure. She cares deeply for innocent lives everywhere, but frequently insists that she has no romantic interest in any of her teammates, and that their job as Heroes is what is most important to her, though there are hints of romance between her and Furno. She is confident in her own ability and refuses to be protected by others. Diplomatic in nature, Breez is a fierce fighter when it comes to defending innocents, and will go out of her way to ensure citizen safety during missions. Breez has the ability to communicate with all known types of animals due to a program in her Hero Core, which also allows her to sense disturbances in nature. She is also skilled in knife and hook throwing, which featured prominently in her 2.0 training.
- Nathan Evo is an introspective rookie Hero working with the team, who emphasizes the use of heavy artillery in missions. Initially calm and quiet, Evo debuted as an expert at weaponry. During his initial missions, he meditates before a fight to stimulate himself and sharpen his reflexes. As a rookie on the Alpha 1 team, he faces pressures to live up to team leader Stormer, but with the assistance of his other teammates, he overcomes self-doubt and insecurity in order to be a worthwhile ally and Hero. Later, Evo develops an enthusiasm for all types technology, embracing the Battle Machines used in Antropolis City. Evo is born with the 2.0 Upgrade.
- Julius Nex is the socially nuanced and technologically gifted head of Hero Outreach and a rookie on Alpha 1, with a love for gadgetry. He is enthusiastic, highly skilled in the nuances of his body, has amazing flexibility, and hypersensitive senses. He is a communication expert, able to interface with nearly any system. For "Mission: Savage Planet", he was programmed with instinct algorithms based on those of a saber-toothed tiger. Like Evo, Nex is born with the 2.0 Upgrade. Once, as he was falling, (in Savage Planet), he cries out, "Tell Breez I loved her!" shocking viewers. So, yes, he has a crush on Breez :)
- Daniel Rocka is the headstrong new rookie of the team, also a member of the Hero Recon Team, a special covert division of Hero Factory. Rocka's outlook is very much like a younger Furno's; he is extremely self-assured and headstrong, willing to immediately take on a challenge without a thought to his own limitations. This confidence causes him to clash with Furno, but the two eventually settle their differences. His experience in the training sphere has given him a diverse skill-set. As a member of the Recon Team, he is also versed in secrecy and espionage teachings. Rocka specializes in technology, and excels in developing new software applications and devices. Like Evo and Nex, Rocka is born with the 2.0 Upgrade. He is one of the main protagonists of the series.

=== Villains ===
- Von Nebula - an evil mastermind who mastered the manipulation of black holes through a technological staff he developed. He was once a Hero himself, named Von Ness, but cowardly abandoned his teammate Stormer after a mission gone wrong. Descending down a warped path of villainy, he hires the most dangerous villains in the galaxy so that he can get his revenge on Stormer, blaming him for his own failures and insecurities as a hero. After a fight with Stormer and Furno he is defeated, and they trap him inside his own black hole staff, placing it inside prison storage to keep it under watch. Voltix then uses the black hole staff to cause a villain breakout, leading the Heroes to conclude that Von Nebula wanted the staff to be placed inside Hero Factory for a grander scheme. His whereabouts are now unknown.
- XPlode - a villain who can fire explosive spikes out of his armor. He and his partner Rotor were hired by Von Nebula. While trying to steal explosives from two transports, the Heroes stop them; in the second time, Rotor is captured, but XPlode flees the scene. Later, he teams up with Thunder, Corroder and Meltdown to destroy the Heroes. After the Heroes beat the villains, XPlode fires his explosives at the Heroes, but they managed to survive his attack. XPlode is knocked out and he and the other villains are arrested for their crimes. XPlode is involved in the Breakout, but is recaptured. He is a coward, due to him leaving Rotor behind on their robberies.
- Meltdown - a sophisticated thug known for using toxins and poisons to control targets. The Heroes rush to find a cure after Preston Stormer is hit by Meltdown's fast-acting toxin while investigating a distress signal on a prison planet.
- Corroder - a maniacal armed with corrosive acid. He takes great pleasure in trying to melt his enemies to a puddle, but he is also a coward who will flee if the situation isn’t to his advantage. He can use his claw-like weapons called Acid Blasters to move as a quadruped.
- Thunder - a powerful bruiser equipped with a deadly nebula gas weapon given to him by Von Nebula. He nearly destroyed Stormer with it, but the hero was saved by his reinforced armor given by Quadal.
- Rotor - a dull, brutish villain who sports built-in helicopter blades, which he both uses to fly and as a spinning weapon. He was partners with XPlode, but when XPlode abandoned him, he became the first villain ever taken down by Furno.
- Vapor - This villain did not appear in the television series physically for an unknown reason, possibly due to budget issues, but he was referenced in a Wanted poster in a cameo in "The Enemy Within". he became the second villain ever taken down by Bulk.
- Fire Lord - the leader of the Fire Villains.
- Jetbug
- Drilldozer
- Nitroblast
- Witch Doctor - a former Hero Factory scientist named Aldous Witch who was obsessed with the Quaza stone that lies within the Hero Core. He was banished from the Hero Factory after trying to give himself a Core of his own. He took refuge on the planet Quatros, where he used Quaza spikes to take control of the animal life on the planet in a bid to escape and take his revenge on the Hero Factory. He was stopped by Alpha Team and the rookie Rocka.
- Scorpio - A scorpion-like creature possessed by the Witch Doctor. Now freed from his control by the Alpha 1 Team.
- Waspix - A wasp-like creature possessed by the Witch Doctor. Now freed from his control by the Alpha 1 Team.
- Raw-Jaw - A gorilla-like creature with tusks and possessed by the Witch Doctor. Now freed from his control by the Alpha 1 Team.
- Fangz - Hound-like creatures possessed by the Witch Doctor. Now freed from their control by the Alpha 1 Team.
- Black Phantom
- Voltix
- Toxic Reapa
- Jawblade
- Splitface
- Speeda Demon
- Thornraxx - He did not appear in the television series for an unknown reason, possibly due to budget issues.
- Core Hunter - He did not appear in the television series for an unknown reason, possibly due to budget issues.
- XT4 - He did not appear in the television series for an unknown reason, possibly due to budget issues.
- The Brains - Evil brain-like parasites that take control of beings that landing their abdomens on the beings' heads. Their primary objective is to destroy the Hero Factory.
- The Brains’ creator - a mysterious villain who is working with Von Nebula, Black Phantom, and Voltix. After Black Phantom delivered the Hero Factory's schematics to Von Nebula through a laptop, the mysterious villain noticed and made an evil laugh, planning something evil with the plans. In the "Brain Attack" episode, the villain created the Brains and told them to destroy the Hero Factory, so the Hero Factory will not stand in his way. The villain launched the Brains to the Hero Factory's home planet.
- Pyrox - A member of bull-like creatures possessed by the Brains. Now freed from their control by the Alpha 1 Team.
- Scarox - A member of beetle-like and spider-like creatures possessed by the Brains. Now freed from their control by the Alpha 1 Team.
- Bruizer - A member of rock-armored ape-like creatures possessed by the Brains. Now freed from their control by the Alpha 1 Team.
- Ogrum - A member of ogre-like and ape-like creatures possessed by the Brains. Now freed from their control by the Alpha 1 Team.
- Dragon Bolt - A dragon-like creature possessed by a Brain. Now freed from its control by Rocka.
- Frost Beast - A member of yeti-like and ape-like creatures possessed by the Brains. Now freed from their control by the Alpha 1 Team.
- Aquagon - A member of fish-like and ape-like creatures possessed by the Brains. Now freed from their control by the Alpha 1 Team.
- Jumpers
- Queen Beast
- Jaw Beast
- Flyer Beast
- Splitter Beast
- Tunneler Beast
- Crystal Beast

=== Recurring ===
- Professor Nathaniel Zib is a Senior Mission Manager at Hero Factory who overlooks all of the Alpha 1 team's ongoing missions. A skilled strategist and problem solver, Zib has a no-nonsense attitude while working and will emphasises mission protocols with Heroes both on mission and in the Control Room.
- Quadal is Zib's assistant robot who aids him during Team Alpha 1's missions. He runs scans and completes technical work within the Control Room. Unlike most robots, Quadal can float and also has a set of extensive arms within his body. He communicates mainly through beeping noises that Zib has been seen to understand. Quadal is able to easily make use of technology, and is also talented in the field of numeric sequencing.
- Akiyama Makuro is the founder and chairman of Hero Factory and Makuro Industries. Makuro is the oldest known robot in the galaxy. His origins are unknown. Recognizing the growing amount of evil in the universe, he created the Hero Factory, a corporation dedicated to creating Heroes to protect the galaxy. He personally oversees the creation of every Hero. At Stormer's creation, Makuro felt he was going to be a special Hero, and was correct as Stormer became leader of the Alpha 1 Team. Seeing Furno's creation, Makuro sensed the same thing. Later, after a lengthy time working on the process, Makuro debuts the Upgrade, a larger, stronger design that he later rolls out to all Heroes.

=== Cast and characters overview ===
Character	Stories								
Character	"Trials of Furno"	"Core Crisis"	"The Enemy Within"	"Von Nebula"	"Ordeal of Fire"	Savage Planet	Breakout	"Brain Attack"	"Invasion from Below"
Heroes
Preston Stormer	John Schneider	John Schneider	John Schneider	John Schneider	John Schneider	John Schneider	John Schneider	John Schneider	Peter Sepenauk
William Furno	Eric Christian Olsen	Eric Christian Olsen	Eric Christian Olsen	Eric Christian Olsen	Eric Christian Olsen	Eric Christian Olsen	Eric Christian Olsen	Josh Keaton	Chad Randau
Dunkan Bulk	Christopher B. Duncan	Christopher B. Duncan	Christopher B. Duncan	Christopher B. Duncan		Christopher B. Duncan		Christopher B. Duncan	Chad Randau
Jimi Stringer	Stephen Stanton	Stephen Stanton	Stephen Stanton	Stephen Stanton		Stephen Stanton	Stephen Stanton		
Mark Surge	Bryton James	Bryton James	Bryton James	Bryton James	Bryton James	Flashback	Bryton James	Bryton James	Justin Murphy
Natalie Breez	Jean Louisa Kelly	Jean Louisa Kelly	Jean Louisa Kelly	Jean Louisa Kelly	Jean Louisa Kelly	Flashback		Jean Louisa Kelly	Karen Strassman
Nathan Evo					Tom Kenny		Jason London	Jason London	Justin Murphy
Julius Nex					Jason Canning	Jason Canning			
Daniel Rocka						Tom Kenny	Tom Kenny	Tom Kenny	Christopher Smith
Villains
Von Nebula/ Von Ness		Flashback	Mark Hamill	Mark Hamill			Silent cameo		
XPlode	Jeff Bennett			Jeff Bennett			Silent cameo		
Rotor	Joel Swetow						Silent cameo		
Corroder		Charlie Adler		Charlie Adler			Silent cameo		
Meltdown			Joel Swetow	Joel Swetow			Silent cameo		
Thunder				Fred Tatasciore			Silent cameo		
Fire Lord					Dee Bradley Baker		Silent cameo		
Drilldozer					Fred Tatasciore		Silent cameo		
Jetbug					Tom Kenny		Silent cameo		
Nitroblast					Stephen Stanton		Silent cameo		
Aldous Witch/Witch Doctor						Fred Tatasciore	Silent cameo		
Raw-Jaw						Jason Canning	Silent cameo		
Waspix						Jean Louisa Kelly	Silent cameo		
Black Phantom							Mark Hamill		
Voltix							Rick D. Wasserman		
Speeda Demon							Charlie Adler		
Jawblade							Steve Wilcox		
Splitface							Maurice LaMarche		
Toxic Reapa							Nick Jameson		
Mysterious Villain							Laughing cameo	Tom Kenny	
Recurring
Zib	Henry Winkler	Henry Winkler	Henry Winkler	Henry Winkler	Henry Winkler	Henry Winkler	Henry Winkler	Henry Winkler	
Mr. Makuro	Malcolm McDowell				Malcolm McDowell	Flashback	Malcolm McDowell		
Daniella Capricorn				Jennifer Coolidge	Jennifer Coolidge		Jennifer Coolidge	Jennifer Coolidge	

== Episodes ==
No.	Title	Directed by	Written by	Original release date
1	"Trials of Furno"	Mark Baldo	Sean Catherine Derek	September 20, 2010
The Alpha 1 Team is dispatched to guard a shipment of explosives, with fresh rookie Furno observing above from the Hero craft under Team Leader Stormer's orders as part of his mission trial. Criminal XPlode and his maniacal ally, Rotor, attack the shipment. XPlode abandons Rotor when the battle goes in the Heroes' favor. Stormer gives permission to Furno to come down and states that his mission trial is to chain up Rotor. However, due to his inexperience, the criminal manages to escape. The failure of the mission and Stormer's words make Furno train very hard to become a better Hero, to the point of exhaustion. Eventually, XPlode and Rotor strike an explosives plant, and when Stormer is felled, Furno manages to apprehend Rotor.
2	"Core Crisis"	Mark Baldo	Sean Catherine Derek	September 21, 2010
Bulk, Stringer and Surge are caught in a fight against the vicious Corroder on a prison planet still under construction. While Corroder traps Bulk under a load of girders meant for Surge, Breez transports the injured construction workers to a medibot station, while Furno and Stormer are waiting for core recharges back at the Hero Factory. Corroder has easily gained the upper hand. The Heroes realize the best idea is to form a Hero Cell to protect themselves using their Hero Cores. The energy of their Hero Cores is near depletion, but they all agree it's a chance worth taking. No sooner does the shield go down due to lack of energy, Furno crashes his Hero Pod into Corroder. However, he takes everyone by surprise when he appears unharmed, stating he used his ejector seat to get out before the ship crashed. Meanwhile, Breez has returned with an empty cargo ship, and Furno uses this to his advantage: he bluffs to Corroder and says that a squad of heroes is contained in Breez's ship. Corroder uses his acid weapons to create a smokescreen and escape the scene, while Bulk gets a full core recharge back at the Hero Factory.
3	"The Enemy Within"	Mark Baldo	Sean Catherine Derek	September 22, 2010
A distress call comes in from Mekron City, where Stormer knows the police chief Drax, but Chief Drax is acting strangely and even threatens Stormer and the rookie Heroes. Criminal Meltdown then smashes through the roof window, spraying Stormer with sludge. He later learns that his body has been corrupted by nanobots from the sludge and, after a fight with Stringer, Bulk and Furno, escapes the Hero Factory. The Heroes then travel to a remote planet to acquire an antidote, while Furno finds Stormer and duels him. Furno makes Stormer realize his actions are wrong by comparing him to a rookie that went rogue, Von Ness, and Stormer shuts down. The Heroes finally cure him, and Stormer deduces that someone is plotting against them. Elsewhere, at the centre of a black hole, Von Ness, now re-born as the villainous Von Nebula, notes that police chief Drax and Stormer survived his nanobot corruption and announces to himself that Stormer will be crushed by his hand. NOTE: While Vapor did not physically appear in the series, he only appeared in a Wanted poster in a cameo in Mekron City's police department. In a Hero Factory comic called Showndown! in 2010, Bulk fought Vapor with the help of Furno and a Drop Ship hero. In a Hero Factory guidebook called Hero Factory Face Off: Makuro's Secret Guidebook in 2013, Vapor is imprisoned by the Hero Factory.
4	"Von Nebula"	Mark Baldo	Sean Catherine Derek	September 23, 2010
The Alpha 1 Team is sent to investigate a strange happening at New Stellac City, Stormer soon realizes it's a trap when Thunder and Corroder arrive. Stormer appears to be downed, and the rookies are sent to the scene with new tools. As they arrive, so do XPlode and Meltdown. A black hole opens in the sky, and Furno and Stormer jump in to combat the villain they now know to be pulling the strings - the villain Von Nebula, who was a rogue rookie Hero known formally as Von Ness. Von Nebula goes after Stormer, believing him to be the bigger threat, but Furno destroys the black hole and Von Nebula is sucked into his own Black Hole Orb Staff. Meanwhile, the remaining Heroes take out Von Nebula's thugs. After returning to Makuhero City, the team is cornered by reporter Daniella Capricorn, and the senior Alpha 1 Heroes reveal that Furno, Breez and Surge are now fully fledged Heroes, with Furno as a new Team Leader and referred to by his name by Stormer, something he had previously refused to do.
5	"Ordeal of Fire"	Howard E. Baker	Jesse Peyronel	April 11, 2011
When Tanker Station 22 is attacked by the Fire Villains (consisting of Fire Lord, Drilldozer, Jetbug and Nitroblast), the workers send an emergency call to the Hero Factory. Concurrently, Mr. Makuro presents "The Upgrade" at his annual keynote address with newly built rookie Heroes Nex and Evo - the first to be created with the new Hero building system, but cautions that the new upgrade process is not yet ready to be applied to existing Heroes. Alpha 1 arrive at the station and begin to fight with the attackers. Furno is ordered to go on reconnaissance, and discovers that the villains are drawing power from the fuel. Breez manages to save the workers by transporting them via Drop Ship while Fire Lord is distracted by Stormer and Furno. Discovering that their weapons have little effect on the villains, Stormer orders the team to retreat, but they are blocked off from the Hero Craft by them. Surge breaks away from the others and the villains chase after him, forcing the other Heroes to leave him behind. Back at the Hero Factory, Alpha 1 convince Makuro to upgrade them and after a training exercise, head back to the refueling station. During the fight, Furno requests back-up from Zib, who sends Nex and Evo. Nitroblast and Drilldozer are subdued, but Fire Lord flees to absorb more fuel. As the Heroes close in, a ship ejects Jetbug and knocks Fire Lord away. Stormer apprehends Fire Lord, and Surge jumps out of the ship, telling the others how he took control of it. When they return to Hero Factory, Surge is upgraded and commended for his actions. NOTE: In the comic based on the episode in March 2011, Surge never got himself captured by the villains. He escaped along with his teammates and got the upgrade along with them to get ready to fight the villains.
6–7	"Savage Planet"	Howard E. Baker	Jesse Peyronel	September 5, 2011
Rookie Hero Daniel Rocka, who was born with the upgrade, is sent to find civilian Aldous Witch, who has crash-landed on the planet Quatros. Upon arriving, Rocka cannot find Witch, and is soon confronted by a Fangz animal-native, but is incapable of defeating it and is knocked unconscious. When Rocka is reported missing, the Alpha 1 Team is equipped with animal-based equipment and sent to find him. The team discovers that Aldous Witch has turned into the Witch Doctor and has taken Rocka hostage. The Heroes, Furno, Stringer, Nex, and Bulk (with Stringer and Bulk having the upgrade), with the information given by Zib back at Mission Control, conclude that the excessive mining of the Quaza has made the planet unstable, destroying it from its core. They find an ancient transportation unit that could be used to instantly transport them to the central mine that leads to the core of the planet. Nex concludes that it would only be able to transport three Heroes. Stormer, Rocka, and Bulk enter the teleport, but are shrunken in size. Furno, Nex, Stringer go through the jungle but are attacked by Scorpio on the trek. As they are being attacked, Witch watches through his staff and revels in his certain victory. Rocka's group arrive first at the central mine via the transportation unit, where Witch Doctor had been mining the Quaza. They notice one of the natives, Raw-Jaw, is a slave worker for Witch, collecting the Quaza that is mined. Witch abuses the beast and controls his mind with his Skull Staff and the corrupted Quaza spike implanted onto the Raw-Jaw's back. Witch Doctor finds the Heroes and traps Bulk and Rocka in a box that he used to carry the Quaza stones. They begin by freeing the enslaved Raw-Jaw from Witch Doctor's corrupted Quaza. Rocka, who has since received a modification giving him larger, more resilient armor and a stronger double-claw combo tool, approaches Witch. The two duel with seemingly even power, but Witch Doctor downs Rocka. As Aldous prepares to finish off Rocka, but Stormer intervenes by breaking his staff, rendering his powers useless. Furno and Bulk successfully return the Quaza to the core of the planet, restoring it to its former state. NOTE: In the first of the two comics based on Episode 6, Stringer and Bulk had their 1.0 forms before they got the 3.0 upgrades.
8–9	"Breakout"	Howard E. Baker	Adam Beechen	April 2, 2012
An unprecedented jailbreak occurs in the Hero Factory, releasing every known captive villain into the galaxy who begin spreading chaos and destruction everywhere. All Heroes are called to Mission Control and told by Mission Manager Zib that due to the number of villains at large, each Hero will be sent individually to recapture them. For the mission named "Catch 'Em and Cuff 'Em", the Alpha 1 Team are upgraded with new armor and weapons based on the environment of the villains' known locations. It is revealed that the villainous Black Phantom is behind the prison break, and that it was merely a distraction for the Heroes so he can attempt to destroy the Hero Factory's Assembly Tower while they recapture the escapees. As Stormer, Furno, Evo, Nex, Surge, Breez, Bulk and Stringer are sent to catch and cuff the villains, Rocka remains at the Hero Factory for "security reasons". However, Black Phantom, who already has the mission managers neutralized, puts up Hero Factory's fail-safe shield, blocking all communications between the building and Heroes on missions and preventing anyone from leaving or entering. The situation worsens in various star systems as the villains get the upper hand over the Heroes, but they all manage to capture and cuff the escaped villains. Rocka is told of the situation by Zib before Black Phantom deactivates all the Mission Managers with his mysterious Anti-Quaza. Managing to lower the fail-safe shields Black Phantom put around Hero Factory, Rocka joins the returned Heroes to combat Black Phantom. Catching him in the Assembly Tower, Rocka overloads Black Phantom's systems and finally captures and cuffs him. With order restored in Hero Factory, Zib informs Alpha 1 and Mr. Makuro that Black Phantom sent the building's structural plans to an unknown source. At an unknown location, Von Nebula opens the file in a laptop, while the anonymous person Black Phantom sent the file to laughing hysterically. NOTE 1: Although, Breez, Bulk, Nex, and their assigned villains, Thornraxx, Core Hunter, and XT4, did not appear in the Breakout episodes for an unknown reason, possibly due to budget issues, they got involved in the mission. In two Hero Factory books, Hero Factory Secret Mission 5: Mirror World and Hero Factory Face Off: Makuro's Secret Guidebook in 2013, the three Heroes succeeded in recapturing the villains. NOTE 2: These two episodes are the only ones where Daniel Rocka is referred to as simply "Rocka" in the end credits for an unknown reason.
10	"Brain Attack"	Michael D. Black, Jay Oliva	Adam Beechen	March 7, 2013 (online); April 4, 2013 (television)
Brains, launched by the unknown villain who got the Hero Factory structural plans in the previous episode, are sent to Makuhero City's planet, where they infect and possess the numerous native creatures. They band together to form an invading army, and launch an attack on the city. The Heroes, in the midst of a publicity event celebrating their ongoing accomplishments for "Mission: Catch 'Em and Cuff 'Em", are sent to the Factory to receive upgrades to battle the creatures. Furno is made commander for the mission, and directs numerous teams in an attempt to defeat the brains. Rocka takes on an enormous dragon using a jetpack, while Surge gets possessed by a brain and uses the Assembly Tower to create an army of soulless 'blank Hero' drones. Working together, Alpha 1 manage to release all the creatures and Surge from control of the brains, and defeat the drones. In the clean-up of the battle, more brains are discovered to be lurking underneath the Factory in the tunnels created by Dragon Bolt's infiltration. The workers in the tunnels are then attacked by one of the brains. NOTE 1: In the episode, Furno stated that "Mission: Catch 'Em and Cuff 'Em" is going great. In a Hero Factory book called Hero Factory Secret Mission 3: Collision Course in 2013, all major villains are recaptured while the minor ones are getting scooped up by local law enforcers. In the book's sequel called Hero Factory Secret Mission 4: Robot Rampage in 2013, Furno stated that all villains are recaptured, bringing the mission to an end. NOTE 2: In the episode, due to Bulk and Breez having not appeared in the Breakout episodes, their 2.0 forms' animation models are recycled rather than having their Breakout forms animated.
11	"Invasion from Below"	Jorgen Klubien	Adam Beechen	January 9, 2014 (online)
In the city of Antropolis, a drill for a new underground Metro Line project reveals strange creatures called Jumpers from within the planet that abduct the crew. Hero Factory send in Evo to investigate, which leads to an attack on the city by giant beasts. The Alpha 1 Team is flown in to stop the monsters by building battle machines to combat the beasts. Breez discovers that the monsters communicate with each other, while Stormer and Furno get abducted by the Jumpers. The remaining Heroes build more battle machines to explore the tunnel, while reinforcements from Hero Factory take on the Jumpers in the city above. After much exploration, the team arrive in the hive nest and discover their missing teammates hidden in cocoons in the custody of the Queen Mother of the beasts, who calls for more Jumpers and beasts to fight in her aid. Surrounded, Breez talks to the Queen and convinces her to free the other Heroes and let them all leave. However, the accidental death of one of the monsters causes the Queen to turn on the Heroes, forcing them to attack her. The pillar containing the nest collapses during the fight, crushing the Queen and sending the larvae falling into the lava. The Heroes escape to the surface where the tunnel is resealed, keeping the monsters inside. The Heroes head back to the Hero Factory, unaware of a Jumper cocoon hidden away in the loading deck of the Hero Craft. NOTE: This episode had a different animation company and set of voice actors from the other episodes.

== Broadcast and release ==
The first four TV episodes aired continuously over four nights in September 2010, and were later released onto DVD as a singular film titled Hero Factory: Rise of the Rookies on November 16. A fifth episode titled "Ordeal of Fire" debuted in April 2011, followed by two further episodes - the two part story Savage Planet - in September as a one-hour special. All three were released onto DVD on October 4 the same year, as Hero Factory: Savage Planet, with "Ordeal of Fire" added as a bonus feature. The broadcast format was repeated for the two-part story Breakout in April 2012.

The tenth episode "Brain Attack" premiered on the official Hero Factory website in March 2013, receiving a TV broadcast the following month on Nicktoons. A further episode titled "Invasion from Below" was produced by Lego with design partner Advance and animation company Ghost. Despite being produced by a different studio, the episode shares the same continuity as the rest of the series. The episode premiered as part of the online game of the same name in January 2014, and with Lego's decision to discontinue Hero Factory after 2014, is the last episode of the series.

=== Internationally ===
In mid-2011, Turner Broadcasting System Europe acquired the UK TV rights to the series for airing on Cartoon Network during August–October of that year.

== Merchandise ==
Hero Factory
- Sub‑themes: Hero Recon Team
- Availability: 2010–2014
- Total sets: 37
- Characters: Von Nebula, XPlode, Meltdown, Corroder, Thunder, Rotor, Vapor, Fire Lord, Drilldozer, Jetbug, Nitroblast, Witch Doctor, Scorpio, Fangz, Waspix, Raw-Jaw, Preston Stormer, Dunkan Bulk, Jimi Stringer, William Furno, Natalie Breez, Mark Surge, Nathan Evo, Julius Nex, and Rocka.
- Official website

Lego Hero Factory (stylized as LEGO HERO FACTORY) is a line of toys by the LEGO Group marketed primarily at 6 to 16-year-olds. It was created in response to the decision to discontinue the Bionicle theme in early 2010.

=== Construction sets ===
The first Hero Factory sets were released on July 3, 2010, in the United Kingdom with the remaining five sets being released on July 4, 12, and 24. All original fifteen sets were released in the United States on July 24. Within the 15 sets released there are six hero characters, six villain characters, two vehicle, and a hero and villain limited edition set. The six hero sets are packaged in cylindrical canisters and contain around 17 to 19 pieces. The hero sets have an age rating of 6–16 and are around 15 cm (6") tall. The villain sets are packaged in rectangular boxes and contain 40 to 50 pieces. The exception is the Von Nebula and Rotor sets which have 156 and 145 pieces respectively and are packaged in a larger box of the China. All the villain sets have an age rating of 7–16 and are around 17 cm (7") tall besides Von Nebula who is around 22 cm (9") tall and has an age rating of 9–16 and Rotor who is around 20 cm (8") and has an age rating of 8–16. The two vehicle sets are Furno Bike and Drop Ship. The Furno Bike set includes 165 pieces and has an age rating of 8–16. It contains a 30 cm (12") long motor bike and the hero character William Furno. The Drop Ship contains 390 pieces and has an age rating of 9–16. It contains a 43 cm (17") drop ship and a hero factory pilot. The Duncan Bulk and Vapour set contains 89 pieces and has an age rating of 8–16. It includes the hero Duncan Bulk, and the villain Vapour, with both figures being around 15 cm (6") tall.

In December 2010 ten new sets were released. The sets included six hero sets and four villain sets. The hero sets contain around 30 pieces, have an age rating of 6–16, and are around 17 cm (7") tall. The heroes sets are in rebuilt forms also known as 2.0 form and include Stormer 2.0, Furno 2.0, Breez 2.0, Surge 2.0, Evo 2.0 and Nex 2.0. The four villain sets form the Fire Villain storyline. Three of the villain sets - Drilldozer, Jetbug, and Nitroblast, contain around 60 pieces, have an age rating of 7–16, and are around 21 cm (8"). The exception is the set Fire Lord which contains 125 pieces, stands around 26 cm (10"), and has an age rating of 9–16.
