= Fine Gold (film) =

- Spanish: Oro fino
- Directed by: José Antonio de la Loma
- Written by: José Antonio de la Loma
- Produced by: Marcos Eguizábal
- Cinematography: Alejandro Ulloa
- Edited by: José Antonio de la Loma Jr.
- Music by: Vladimir Horunzhy
- Production company: Golden Sun
- Distributed by: Astral Video; Audio Visual Enterprises; Forum Home Video; MCEG Virgin Vision; Metro-Goldwyn-Mayer (MGM); Overseas FilmGroup
- Release date: 20 July 1989 (Spain)
- Running time: 96 minutes
- Country: Spain
- Languages: Spanish; English

Fine Gold (Spanish: Oro fino) is a 1989 Spanish drama film directed by José Antonio de la Loma and starring Ted Wass, Stewart Granger and Lloyd Bochner. It depicts the ongoing feud between two winemaking families. In the United States, it aired in first run syndication.

== Cast ==
- Ted Wass - Andre
- Jane Badler - Julia
- Lloyd Bochner - Don Pedro
- Stewart Granger - Don Miguel
- Andrew Stevens - Michael
- Tia Carrere - Stella
- Ray Walston - Sacacorchos
- Simón Andreu - Simon
- Concha Cuetos - Isabel
- Fernando Hilbeck - professor
- Tony Isbert - Carlos
- Robert Avard Miller - Don Roberto
- Jack Taylor - banker #2
- Frank Braña
- José María Caffarel
