= Tragic Ceremony =

- Italian: Estratto dagli archivi segreti della polizia di una capitale europea
- Spanish: Trágica ceremonia en villa Alexander
- Directed by: Riccardo Freda
- Screenplay by: Mario Bianchi
- Story by: Mario Bianchi
- Starring: Camille Keaton; Luciana Paluzzi; Luigi Pistilli; Giovanni Petrucci
- Cinematography: Francisco Fraile
- Edited by: Iolanda Benvenuti
- Music by: Stelvio Cipriani
- Production companies: Produzioni Internazionali Associate; Tecisa
- Distributed by: P.I.A.
- Release dates: 20 December 1972 (Italy); September 1974 (Spain)
- Running time: 82 minutes
- Countries: Italy; Spain
- Box office: ₤7.68 million

Tragic Ceremony (Italian: Estratto dagli archivi segreti della polizia di una capitale europea—lit. Extracted from the Secret Police Archives of a European Capital; Spanish: Trágica ceremonia en villa Alexander—lit. Tragic ceremony in Villa Alexander) is a 1972 Gothic horror film directed by Riccardo Freda (Note: Credited as Robert Hampton.) and starring Camille Keaton, Tony Isbert, Máximo Valverde, and Irina Demick in her final film role. Its plot follows a group of young people who find themselves haunted in the hours after witnessing a black mass while lodging at a remote estate during a rainstorm.

The film received a limited theatrical release in Italy on 20 December 1972. In 2004 it was restored and shown as part of the retrospective "Storia Segreta del Cinema Italiano: Italian Kings of the Bs" at the 61st Venice International Film Festival. The film was never dubbed in English and it's distributed worldwide by Variety Distribution.

== Plot ==
After a day of sailing, a group of friends — Jane, Bill, Joe, and Fred — are traveling through the English countryside when their car runs out of fuel. In the midst of a rainstorm, they are given a small amount by a petrol station attendant and guided to a nearby side road. They follow it and, just as they again run out of fuel, come across a large estate owned by Lord and Lady Alexander, who offer to refuel their car and invite them to spend the night.

Later in the evening, Jane hears organ music emanating from the basement and goes to find the source. She enters a hidden chamber where the Alexanders are performing a black mass with a group of fellow devil worshippers. When they realize she has infiltrated the event, they attempt to use her as a human sacrifice. Bill, Joe, and Fred go to find her and begin fighting with the cultists. In a tussle, Bill stabs Lady Alexander in the stomach, killing her. The cultists, having lost their sacrifice, go berserk and attack each other with guns, machetes and swords.

Jane, Bill, Joe, and Fred run to their car and escape the castle grounds, fleeing into the night and returning to the petrol station, which is now mysteriously derelict and appears to have been abandoned years earlier. They arrive at Bill's mother's house later in the evening, but Bill's mother, angry over a missing necklace, directs them to stay in a hotel. Instead, they take motorcycles to Bill's father's country house. On the nightly news, they watch as the massacre at the Alexander estate is covered by local media. In the news report, a broken necklace — which Jane had been wearing — as well as a guitar left behind by Bill are noted as evidence, and it is also stated that Lady Alexander has gone missing. The police surmise that "hippies" may have been responsible and liken the crime scene to the Tate murders.

After falling asleep upstairs, Fred awakens and finds Bill missing. He searches for him and finds his corpse in a closet. Later, Fred is found with his throat slashed in the bathroom. Jane and Joe flee the home, riding into the woods on a motorcycle. The two stop in a meadow to rest and begin to kiss. Joe looks down at Jane and sees the flesh around her mouth turn necrotic. Terrified, he flees on the motorcycle but crashes into a pond. Jane appears at the edge of the pond, her face pale but mouth restored; Joe begs for her help but she watches silently as he drowns.

Later, Jane is at a mental institution, where she is questioned by psychologists and doctors. In her room, she is confronted by an apparition of Lady Alexander, who stabs her to death. The apparition then leaves the hospital and enters a taxi, asking the driver to take her to the villa. It is implied that during the attempted sacrifice, Lady Alexander's spirit had taken over Jane's body and had been vying for control of it, thus murdering the three men.

== Cast ==
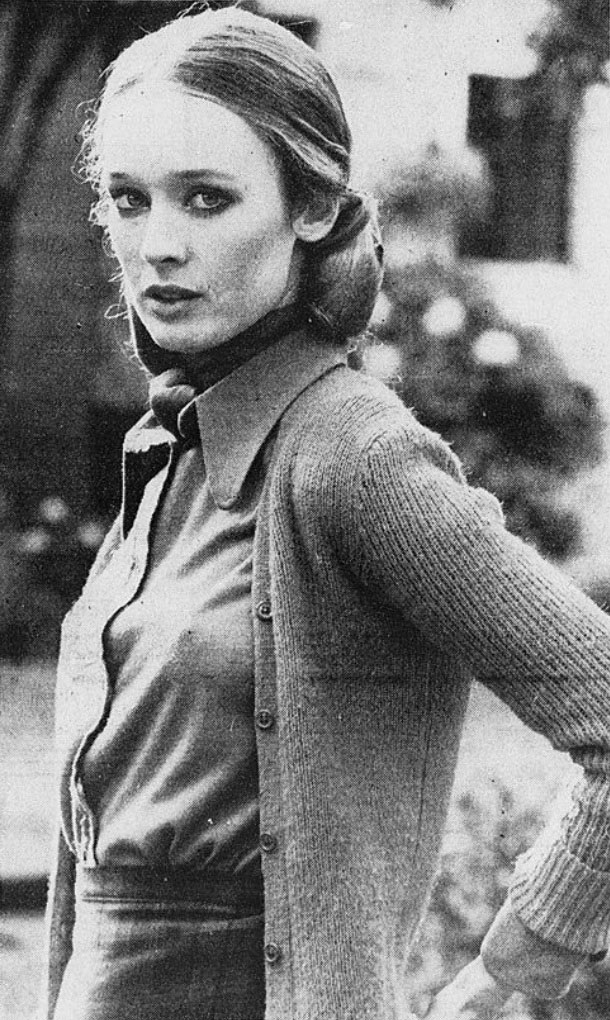
Keaton in Rome in 1972. Tragic Ceremony was Keaton's first leading role.

- Camille Keaton as Jane
- Tony Isbert as Bill
- Máximo Valverde as Joe
- Giovanni Petrucci as Fred
- Luigi Pistilli as Lord Alexander
- Luciana Paluzzi as Lady Alexander
- Irina Demick as Bill's mother
- Paul Muller as Doctor
- Beni Deus as Ferguson
- Milo Quesada as Cop
- José Calvo as Gas Station Attendant

== Production ==
Tragic Ceremony credits list José Gutiérrez Maesso and Leonardo Martin as screenwriters on the Spanish version of the film. They are credited strictly for co-production purposes.

Tragic Ceremony was shot on location in Spain, beginning in June 1972. According to film historian Roberto Curti, it is possible that a second director, named Filippo Walter Ratti, was involved in shooting part of the film. Freda's daughter, Jacqueline, who was on the set, claimed her father was present for the entire filming process. However, Curti's assessment based on the original script for the film surmises that at least two scenes were likely shot by Ratti: the scene in which Bill's corpse is discovered with his face tinted blue and the scene in which Fred has his throat slashed in the bathroom. The film's special effects were provided by effects artist Carlo Rambaldi.

== Release ==
Tragic Ceremony was given a limited theatrical release on 20 December 1972 in Italy, and later received a theatrical release in Spain in September 1974. In 2004, the film was restored and screened at the 61st Venice International Film Festival as part of a "Storia Segreta del Cinema Italiano" series. After the screening, the film was reportedly booed by the audience.

=== Home media ===
Tragic Ceremony was released on DVD for the first time in North America on 29 January 2008 by Dark Sky Films. It was released on Blu-ray in 2021 as part of collection titled Camille Keaton in Italy by Vinegar Syndrome. This version was newly scanned & restored in 2K from its 35mm original camera negative.

== Reception ==
Paper magazine gave the film a positive review, calling it a "truly rare Gothic Italian chiller" and a "groovy and gory gas." Maitland McDonagh of TV Guide gave the film a middling review, noting: "An odd and not entirely successful genre hybrid, Freda's film is nonetheless of interest to fans of 1970s Euro-horror, and a welcome opportunity to see Camille Keaton play something other than a sexually abused woman-child." Dave Kehr wrote in the New York Times, describing it as a "defiantly disjointed horror film," and that "The story is the archetypal one of a group of attractive young people lured into the lair of Devil worshipers, yet the violent consequences are unexpectedly imaginative, and the film's wanton neglect of narrative logic gives it an insinuating, dreamlike flow."

Jeremiah Kipp of Slant Magazine gave the film a negative review, writing: "Tragic Ceremony starts out as a nondescript, frankly mundane Italian variation of the horror movie template where four kids having car trouble stop at a haunted house and find themselves kidnapped by a satanic cult ... These sporadic bursts of cult-movie oddness are amusing, but [the film] isn't scary enough to induce terror, unintentionally funny enough for camp or bizarre enough for mad surrealism."

== See also ==
- List of Italian films of 1972

== Sources ==
- Chiti, Roberto; Poppi, Roberto; Lancia, Enrico (1991). Dizionario del cinema italiano: I film (in Italian). Gremese. ISBN 978-88-7605-935-3.
- Curti, Roberto (2017). Riccardo Freda: The Life and Works of a Born Filmmaker. Jefferson, North Carolina: McFarland & Company. ISBN 978-1-4766-6970-0.
- Moliterno, Gino (2008). Historical Dictionary of Italian Cinema. Lanham, Maryland: Scarecrow Press. ISBN 978-0-8108-6073-5.
