= Foodfight! =

2012 animated film

- US DVD cover
- Directed by: Lawrence Kasanoff
- Written by: Brent Friedman; Rebecca Swanson; Sean Catherine Derek; Lawrence Kasanoff
- Story by: Lawrence Kasanoff; Joshua Wexler
- Produced by: Lawrence Kasanoff; Joshua Wexler; George Johnsen
- Starring: Charlie Sheen; Eva Longoria; Hilary Duff; Wayne Brady; Chris Kattan; Larry Miller; Harvey Fierstein; Christopher Lloyd
- Edited by: Ray Mupas; Craig Paulsen; Ann Hoyt; Sean Rourke
- Music by: Walter Murphy
- Production companies: Threshold Animation Studios; Fireman's Fund Insurance Company
- Distributed by: Viva Pictures
- Release date: June 15, 2012
- Running time: 87 minutes
- Country: United States
- Language: English
- Budget: $45–65 million
- Box office: $120,323

Foodfight! is a 2012 American animated adventure comedy film co-produced and directed by Lawrence Kasanoff (in his feature directorial debut), who wrote the screenplay with Brent Friedman, Rebecca Swanson and Sean Catherine Derek from a story Kasanoff conceived with Joshua Wexler. The film features the voices of Charlie Sheen, Wayne Brady, Hilary Duff, Eva Longoria, Larry Miller, and Christopher Lloyd. Foodfight! takes place in the "Marketropolis" supermarket, which, after closing time, transforms into a city inhabited by "Ikes", personifications of well-known food mascots. The story follows a cereal brand mascot, Dex Dogtective, who, along with his best friend Daredevil Dan, join forces with their fellow "Ikes" to fight against the forces of the evil Brand X, who threaten to take over the entire supermarket.

After raising tens of millions of dollars in funding, Foodfight! had a troubled and much-delayed production. The film was originally scheduled for a Christmas 2003 theatrical release; however, this failed to materialize, and later planned release dates in 2005 and 2007 were also missed. By September 2011, after the producers defaulted on a loan, creditors auctioned off the film's assets and all associated rights to Fireman's Fund Insurance Company.

In 2012, the film had a modest release, being direct-to-video in most territories. Its critical reception was overwhelmingly negative, with most criticism directed towards the animation, humor, story and excessive product placement. It has often been discussed as one of the worst films of all time.

== Plot ==
When night falls at the supermarket Marketropolis, the store products' mascots ("ikes," from "icons") come to life and interact with each other. Heroic cereal mascot Dex Dogtective is about to propose to his girlfriend Sunshine Goodness, a raisin mascot, but she goes missing just before he is able to do so.

Six months later, a Brand X representative named Mr. Clipboard arrives at Marketropolis and aggressively pushes Brand X's range of generic products to Leonard, the store's manager. In the world of the Ikes, the arrival of Lady X, the seductive Brand X detergent Ike, causes a commotion at Dex's club, the Copabanana.

Brand X products begin to replace previous products, which is mirrored in the Ikes' world with the deaths of several Ikes. After Dex's friend Daredevil Dan, a chocolate squirrel, disappears, Dex begins to investigate. After rebuffing Lady X's attempts to bring him to Brand X's side, Dex is locked in a dryer with Dan to be melted, but the two manage to escape. Dan and Dex find out that Brand X contains an addictive and toxic secret ingredient.

After managing to cross the store during daylight hours, Dex and Dan attempt to initiate a product recall with Leonard's computer, but a Brand X Ike cuts power just as they send the message. Dex then rallies the citizens of Marketropolis to fight the armies of Brand X in a massive food fight. The citizens win the battle by using the supermarket's electricity.

Dex rescues Sunshine, who had been held hostage in the Brand X tower, and escapes with the help of Dan. Mr. Clipboard then enters the Ikes' world, but he is taken down by Dex, who discovers that he is a robot controlled by Lady X. Lady X reveals that she had previously been the hideous Ike (Priscilla Pusly) of an unsuccessful brand of prunes, and had been stealing Sunshine's essence to create a new brand. Dex and Sunshine defeat her, reverting her to her original form. With Brand X defeated and a cure found that revives the killed Ikes, Dex and Sunshine finally get married.

== Cast ==
Along with many licensed characters, the principal characters of the film are original characters.

- Charlie Sheen as Dex Dogtective, an anthropomorphic dog investigator, owner of the Copabanana nightclub, and mascot for a cereal product.
- Wayne Brady as Daredevil Dan, Dex's best friend; a squirrel pilot of a small aircraft and mascot for a chocolate product and the film's comic relief.
- Hilary Duff as Sunshine Goodness, an anthropomorphic cat mascot for a raisin brand; Dex's fiancée and eventual wife.
- Eva Longoria as Lady X / Priscilla Pusly, former mascot of the prune product turned owner and leader of Brand X.
- Larry Miller as Vlad Chocool, a chocolate cereal vampire bat with attraction for Dan.
- Christopher Lloyd as Mr. Clipboard, the man robot representative for Brand X products in the human world.
- Robert Costanzo as Maximillus Moose
- Chris Kattan as Polar Penguin
- Ed Asner as Mr. Leonard
- Jerry Stiller as General X
- Christine Baranski as Hedda Shopper
- Lawrence Kasanoff as Cheasel T. Weasel
- Harvey Fierstein as Fat Cat Burglar
- Cloris Leachman as Brand X Lunch Lady
- Haylie Duff as Sweetcakes
- Shelley Morrison as Lola Fruitola
- Edie McClurg as Mrs. Butterworth
- George Johnsen as Kaptain Krispy
- Greg Ellis as Hairy Hold
- James Arnold Taylor as Doctor Si Nustrix
- Jeff Bennett as Lieutenant X
- Stephen Stanton as Mr. Clean (deleted scene), Lord Flushington
- Jeff Bergman as Charlie The Tuna
- Sean Catherine Derek as Toddler's Mom
- Enn Reitel as Kung Tofu / François Fromage
- Daniel Franzese as Twinkie The Kid
- Jason Ortenberg, Zachary Liebreich-Johnsen, Andrew Ortenberg and Jennifer Keith as the Ike Kids
- Joshua Wexler, George Johnsen, Jason Harris, and Greg Eagles as the Hairless Hamster Henchmen

Additional voices are provided by Melissa Disney, Jennifer Keith, Bob Bergen, Susan Silo, Daniel Bernhardt, Jeff Bennett, Stephen Stanton, James Arnold Taylor, and John Bloom.

== Soundtrack ==
Foodfight! had an extensive soundtrack built mostly of cover versions of well-known contemporary songs and original songs sung by the characters' voice actors, provided by a variety of licensing companies. The film's end credits overlay soundtrack, an upbeat duet pop song titled "The Brightside" by Tif McMillin and Richard Page, was an original song.

"It's Our World"

- Written by Neil Jason and John McCurry

"Tonight's the Nite"

- Written by Neil Jason and J. Davis

"Dare The Day"

- Performed by Wayne Brady
- Written by Michael Lloyd and Greg O'Connor

"I Heard it Through the Grapevine"

- Performed by Joe Esposito (as "Joe Bean Esposito") and Brooklyn Dreams
- Written by Norman Whitfield (as Norman J. Whitfield) and Barrett Strong

"Wow!"

- Performed by Good Grief featuring Shanna Crooks
- Written by Keith Ridenour, Bud Tower, Douglas Shawe and Wayne Hood

"You Are My Sunshine"

- Written by Jimmie Davis and Charles Mitchell

"Honor is Ours"

- Performed by The Swamp Daddys
- Written by Keith Ridenour, Dean Madonia and Scott Avery

"Brand X"

- Performed by Jeff Bennett
- Written by Lawrence Kasanoff

"USDA"

- Written by Lawrence Kasanoff

"Fire in the Skies"

- Written by Janey Street, Charles English and Pam Wolfe

"The Brightside"

- Performed by Tif McMillin and Richard Page
- Written by Janey Street and Vince Melamed

"You Got Me Believing"

- Performed by Joe Esposito (as "Joe Bean Esposito") and Brooklyn Dreams
- Written by Donna Summer and Bruce Sudano

"Hava Nagilah"

- Adapted by Michael Lloyd and John D'Andrea

== Production ==
=== Conception ===
Lawrence Kasanoff and a Threshold Entertainment employee, Joshua Wexler, created the concept in 1997. A $25 million joint investment into the project was made by Threshold and the Korean investment company Natural Image, with the producers expecting that foreign pre-sales and loans against the sales would provide the remaining portion of the budget. The estimated remainder was $50 million. Kasanoff also decided to produce and direct the film, despite having no prior experience in the animation field. Kasanoff had hoped that the movie would kickstart a franchise with similar scenarios including Arcade (which would feature video game characters) and Mascots (which would feature sports mascot suits coming to life).

=== Production setbacks ===
The film was created and produced by the digital effects shop at Threshold, located in Santa Monica, California in the Los Angeles metropolitan area. In December 2002, Kasanoff reported that hard drives containing most unfinished assets from the film had been stolen, in what he called an act of "industrial espionage" and "an incredibly complex crime". Kasanoff stated that an investigation, which involved the United States Secret Service, was unable to find the perpetrator. However, those who worked on the film did not recall this happening, with one assistant claiming that the original hard drives were saved and stored properly and believed that Kasanoff was simply not satisfied with them. A behind-the-scenes showreel Kasanoff put together to entice investors is the only significant surviving footage of the original incarnation of the film. The film was supposed to be computer-animated, with an exaggerated use of "squash and stretch" to resemble the Looney Tunes shorts, but after production resumed in 2004, Kasanoff changed it to a style more centered in motion capture, with the result being that "he and animators were speaking two different languages".

Kasanoff's haphazard micromanaging and misunderstanding of animation frustrated the crew, made more difficult due to his insistence of bringing his pet dogs into the studio, one of whom was difficult to maintain. Kasanoff also reportedly requested a nude 3D render of Lady X which he would admire during his off-time, and could not understand why animators trained exclusively in texturing could not work on other aspects of the film. As production progressed, several brands that had granted permission to appear in the film backed out, including Cheetos and M&M's. Allegedly, the latter was displeased with how the M&M characters were to be portrayed; the animators had mistakenly rendered the Green M&M, a female mascot, as male within the footage shown to company representatives, and the character had a line written for her about having a case of "peanut envy". McKee Foods and General Mills withdrew permission for Little Debbie and Count Chocula to appear due to a scene in which Daredevil Dan catcalls the former and the latter's portrayal as a pervert with a chocolate obsession, which led to the creation of the character Vlad Chocool.

==== Delays ====
Lionsgate established a distribution deal and the financing company StoryArk represented investors who gave $20 million in funding to Threshold in 2005 due to the Lionsgate deal, the celebrity voice actors, and the product tie-ins. A release date in 2005 was later announced, but missed. Another distribution deal was struck in 2007, but again, nothing came of it. Lionsgate had a negative reaction to the delays. The investors had grown impatient due to the film production company defaulting on its secured promissory note and the release dates that were not met.

==== Auction ====
In 2011, the film was auctioned for $2.5 million. StoryArk investors had ultimately invoked a clause in their contract that allowed the Fireman's Fund Insurance Company, which had insured Foodfight!, to complete and release the film as inexpensively and quickly as possible. Animator Ken Bailey stated that "The film was already ruined. They were just trying to salvage what they could."

== Release ==
The insurance company received the copyright to the film in 2012 and began releasing it and its associated merchandise. In June 2012, Foodfight! received a limited release in the United Kingdom, grossing approximately £15,000 of ticket sales in its single week in theatres. It was released on DVD in Europe that October with distribution by Boulevard Entertainment.

In February 2013, the film was released on VOD and DVD in the United States on May 7, 2013. Jake Rossen of The New York Times described the film's United States release as "a muted debut". The United States release was delayed because the American distributor, Viva Pictures, wanted to release it when Walmart could arrange for a satisfactory product display for the film. According to company president Victor Elizalde, Viva Pictures' modest investment of an unspecified sum had proved profitable.

== Reception ==
Upon the film's initial announcement in 2001, it was denounced for heavy product placement in a film targeted at children. Kasanoff responded to the controversy by stating that they were not paid monetarily for the brand inclusion, and therefore the addition of known brands did not constitute product placement; however, the brands were expected to provide $100 million worth of cross-promotion.

Since its release, Foodfight! has been panned by critics and audiences alike, and is considered one of the worst films ever made: Mental Floss included it in a list of "10 Really Bad Movies that Define 'Bad Movies'" in 2012 and it appeared in lists of the worst movies ever made on Digital Trends in 2017, MSN in 2018, Fotogramas in 2020 and Time Out in 2022. It has also been referred to as one of the worst animated films ever made by Indiewire in 2015, Comic Book Resources in 2021, and twice by Screen Rant, in 2017 and 2020. In 2017, Rebecca Hawkes of The Daily Telegraph described Foodfight! as "the worst animated children's film ever made". In 2024, Collider not only named it the worst fantasy movie of the 2010s, but the "absolute worst [movie] of the 21st century, without any real competition."

A 2012 review by Kate Valentine of Hollywood News called it "by far the crappiest piece of crap I have ever had the misfortune to watch", and a 2013 article from The New York Times was similarly scathing, saying, "The animation appears unfinished [...] And the plot [...] is impenetrable and even offensive." The New York Times article also reported that Foodfight! has been "seized upon by Internet purveyors of bad cinema".

Describing the film as "one of those fall-of-civilization moments", Nathan Rabin of The A.V. Club wrote in 2013 that: "the grotesque ugliness of the animation alone would be a deal-breaker even if the film weren't also glaringly inappropriate in its sexuality, nightmare-inducing in its animation, and filled with Nazi overtones and iconography even more egregiously unfit for children than the script's wall-to-wall gauntlet of crude double entendres and weird intimations of inter-species sex". Rabin revisited Foodfight! in a 2019 article, stating that it "was the kind of bad movie I live for. This is the kind of movie so unbelievably, surreally and exquisitely terrible that you want to share it with the rest of the world. I was put on earth to suffer through abominations like Foodfight! so that society as a whole might benefit from my Christ-like sacrifice." In 2020, Esquire's Tom Nicholson wrote that the film was "The Room, rendered in horribly sharp polygons" and that it was "easily the most horrifically ugly, confusing and unsettling animated film ever made."

In 2024, a YouTube documentary covering details in the production (with interviews and footage of early animation) called Rotten: Behind the Foodfight was released.

== Related media ==
=== Merchandise ===
Associated Foodfight! merchandise was produced and was sold in stores and online, with a fair amount being released several years prior to the film, including plush toys and a Deluxe Sound Storybook.

=== Cancelled video game ===
A tie-in video game based on the film was being developed at Cat Daddy Games for GameCube, Game Boy Advance, PlayStation 2, Xbox, Wii and Nintendo DS from 2004 to early 2008, with a playable demo shown at E3 2006. It was intended to be distributed by 2K. The game was cancelled due to development difficulties and the constantly-changing deadlines caused by the film's delays, leading the developers to subsequently shift to other projects. Footage and details of the video game were leaked by one of the developers, Harley Howe, who also explained the game's development in depth on a blog Mimeohead, in July 2024.

== See also ==
- List of films considered the worst
