= Jewel Shepard =

American actress

- Born: United States
- Citizenship: American
- Occupations: Actress, writer, photographer
- Years active: 1978–present
- Known for: The Return of the Living Dead
- Website: jewelshepard.biz (Archived)

Jewel Shepard is an American actress, writer and photographer best known for her roles in movies such as The Cooler, Hollywood Hot Tubs 2: Educating Crystal, Party Camp, Scenes from the Goldmine and The Return of the Living Dead.

== Career ==
=== Acting ===
Jewel Shepard arrived in California in the 1970s, where she supported herself by working as a stripper in various Los Angeles strip clubs and modeling for car shoots. It was during her time stripping that she met genre filmmaker Dan O'Bannon. After a number of small television roles, Shepard broke into film with H. B. Halicki's The Junkman (1982). Roles in over a dozen B movies followed; including 1985's The Return of the Living Dead, which was directed and written by O'Bannon, and then in the 1987 film Party Camp.

=== Writing ===
In 1992 she capitalized on her "B-girl" status by penning Invasion of the B-Girls, a book of interviews with cult actresses such as Kitten Natividad, Linnea Quigley, Yvette Vickers, Haji, and Mary Woronov.

She has also written for such publications as Esquire, Premiere, Cosmopolitan, Details, and The Associated Press.

Her autobiography, If I'm So Famous, How Come Nobody's Ever Heard of Me?, detailing some of the less glamorous aspects of film making and her experiences working in adult entertainment, was published in 1996.

== Personal life ==
Shepard was diagnosed with invasive breast cancer in 2011, and has been treated with chemotherapy, lymph node removal, and a double mastectomy.

== Filmography ==
=== Film ===
Year	Title	Role	Notes
1978	Teen Lust	Girl	Uncredited
1982	Raw Force	Drunk Sexpot	
1982	The Junkman	Gloria, The Present Girl	
1982	Electric Blue 8	Bobby Beal	
1982	Zapped!	Girl In Car	Uncredited
1983	My Tutor	Girl In Phone Booth	
1983	The Sex and Violence Family Hour	Body Flash Dancer	
1984	Hollywood Hot Tubs	Crystal Landers	
1984	Christina	Christina Von Belle	
1985	The Return of the Living Dead	Casey	
1985	Yellow Pages	Peaches	
1987	Party Camp	Dyanne Stein	
1987	Scenes from the Goldmine	Dana	
1987	The Underachievers	Sci-Fi Teacher	
1989	Hollywood Hot Tubs 2: Educating Crystal	Crystal	
1991	Mission: Killfast	Miss August	
1992	Roots of Evil	Wanda	
1994	Caged Heat 2: Stripped of Freedom	Amanda	
1995	Scanners: The Showdown	Nurse	
1996	Almighty Fred	Herself	
2000	Ministry: Tapes of Wrath	Sexy Girl At Table	
2003	The Cooler	Hooker	
2011	The Artist	Flapper Starlet	Uncredited
2016	Nanoblood	Bot Labs Family	Short film
2017	Slasher.com	Momma Myers	

=== Television ===
Year	Title	Role	Notes
1986	Knots Landing	Woman	Episode: "Unbroken Bonds"
1992–1994	Garfield and Friends	Shannon	Guest role, 2 episodes; voice role
2008–2013	The Garfield Show	Additional Voices	Guest role, 5 episodes; voice role
2011	Double Espresso	Manager	Episode: "Ice Cream Tits"

=== Music videos ===
Year	Title	Role	Artist
1989	Radar Love	Diner Waitress	White Lion
1993	Do Ya Think I'm Sexy?	Cigarette Girl / Demon Girl	Revolting Cocks
