= Scott Thompson Baker =

American actor (born 1960)

- Born: September 15, 1960 (age 66); Golden Valley, Minnesota, U.S.
- Occupation: Actor
- Years active: 1987-present
- Spouse: Maria Baker (m. 2007)

Scott Thompson Baker (born September 15, 1960) is an American television actor. He is known for playing the roles of Colton Shore on the ABC Daytime soap opera General Hospital (1988 to 1991), Craig Lawson on the ABC Daytime soap opera All My Children (1991 to 1992) and Connor Davis on the CBS Daytime soap opera The Bold and the Beautiful (1993 to 1998, 2000, 2002, 2005). He also had a recurring role as Brian Alexander on The WB series Savannah (1996).

== Early life ==
Baker was born in Golden Valley, Minnesota. He attended Eden Prairie High School. His father and brother worked in the insurance business, and Baker initially planned to have the same career. After graduation, he enrolled in Oral Roberts University. He was cast as Captain Von Trapp in a school production of The Sound of Music. The experience made him want to pursue an acting career. After his sophomore year, Baker transferred to the University of Minnesota, where he studied business administration and continued to work in theater.

== Career ==
Baker's professional acting career began at the Guthrie Theatre in Minneapolis. He starred in productions of Peer Gynt and A Christmas Carol. He was eventually spotted by a talent scout who invited him to compete on Star Search. When he first appeared on the show, Baker performed a brief sketch he had written about the difficulties of auditioning. It was well received by the judges and he continued to appear on the show fifteen more times before winning the grand prize of one-hundred thousand dollars.

After winning Star Search, Baker moved to Los Angeles. He studied at the Stella Adler Studio of Acting, working with acting coach Arthur Mendoza. He also appeared in television commercials. In 1987, he guest starred on Falcon Crest. He appeared in the horror films Rest in Pieces and Open House.

In 1987, Baker was cast as Colton Shore on the ABC soap opera General Hospital. In 1989, he won a Soap Opera Digest Award for Outstanding Male Newcomer for his role on General Hospital. In 1990, he received Soap Opera Digest Award nominations for Outstanding Super Couple: Daytime (shared with his co-star, Kristina Wagner) and Outstanding Hero: Daytime. In January 1991, Soap Opera Digest reported that the show's executive producer Gloria Monty had dismissed Baker and several of his co-stars from their roles.

He guest starred on Dark Justice. Baker was cast as Craig Lawson on the ABC soap opera All My Children, first airing in 1991. He was dismissed from the role in June 1992 for storyline dictated reasons. He guest starred on Wings in 1992 and Matlock in 1993. Baker appeared in the television film Perry Mason: The Case of the Skin-Deep Scandal.

In 1993, he was cast in the contract role of Connor Davis on The Bold and the Beautiful. From 1995 to 1996, he guest starred on Almost Perfect, Baywatch Nights, and JAG. In 1996, Baker had a recurring role as Brian Alexander on The WB drama series Savannah. In 1997, he guest starred on Temporarily Yours and Jenny. He left his role on The Bold and the Beautiful in 1998, but he returned for recurring appearances in 2000, 2002, and 2005.

In 1998, Baker guest starred on Alright Already. He also guest starred in the Star Trek: Deep Space Nine episode "One Little Ship" as Kudak'Etan. He appeared in the television film Life of the Party: The Pamela Harriman Story. From 1999 to 2002, Baker guest starred on Party of Five, Becker, Even Stevens, Angel, Baywatch, Grosse Pointe, and Glory Days. He played a Telemetry Technician in the family film Race to Space (2001). He also had a role in the comedy film Mr. Deeds (2002), co-starring with Adam Sandler. In 2006, he played Doug Dorsey in the television film The Cutting Edge: Going for the Gold.

In 2011 and 2012, Baker starred on stage in Jesse – The Original Musical Melodrama during The Defeat of Jesse James Days in Northfield, Minnesota.

== Personal life ==
He married Leilani Soares on January 27, 1990. They had two sons and later divorced.

He married Maria Baker on June 17, 2007.

== Filmography ==
=== Film ===
Year	Title	Role	Notes
1987	Rest in Pieces	Bob Hewitt	
1987	Open House	Joe Pearcy	Credited as Scott Baker
1991	The Butcher's Wife	Fire Eater	Credited as Scott Baker
2001	Race to Space	Telemetry Technician	
2002	Mr. Deeds	News Anchor	
2009	A Serious Man	Sci-Fi Movie Hero	Credited as Scott Baker

=== Television ===
Year	Title	Role	Notes
1987	Falcon Crest	Deputy	Episode: "Manhunt"
1987–1991	General Hospital	Colton Shore	Contract role
1991	Dark Justice	Walter Penn	Episode: "Once Upon a Time in Krestridge"
1991–1992	All My Children	Craig Lawson	Contract role
1992	Wings	Michael	Episode: "It's So Nice to Have a Mather Around the House"
1993–1998; 2000; 2002; 2005	The Bold and the Beautiful	Connor Davis	Contract role (1993–1998); Recurring role (2000, 2002, 2005)
1993	Perry Mason: The Case of the Skin-Deep Scandal	Scott Collins	Television film
1993	Matlock	Daniel Wallace	Episode: "The Final Affair"
1995	Almost Perfect	Bob MacMillan	Episode: "Presumed Impotent"
1996	Baywatch Nights	Pierce	Episode: "Backup"
1996	JAG	Major Russell	Episode: "Recovery"
1996	Savannah	Brian Alexander	Recurring role, 8 episodes
1997	Temporarily Yours	Allen	Episode: "Temp-tation"
1997	Jenny	Mark	Episode: "A Girl's Gotta Lie"
1998	Alright Already		Episode: "Again with the Satellite Dish"
1998	Star Trek: Deep Space Nine	First Kudak'Etan	Episode: "One Little Ship"
1998	Life of the Party: The Pamela Harriman Story	Young W. Averell Harriman	Television film
1999	Party of Five	Jerry Rutledge	Episode: "Whatever Works"
1999	Becker	Dr. Witlin	Episode: "Drive, They Said"
2000	Even Stevens	Porter Dandridge	Episode: "Family Picnic"
2000	Angel	Actor	Episode: "Are You Now or Have You Ever Been"
2000	Baywatch	Pete Miller	Episode: "Ben"
2001	Grosse Pointe	Dr. Martin	Episode: "End of the Affair"
2002	Glory Days	Calvin Jarrett/Frank Levy	Episode: "There Goes the Neighborhood"
2006	The Cutting Edge: Going for the Gold	Doug Dorsey	Television film

== Awards and nominations ==
Year	Award	Category	Title	Result	Ref.
1989	Soap Opera Digest Award	Outstanding Male Newcomer	General Hospital	Won	
1990	Soap Opera Digest Award	Outstanding Super Couple: Daytime (shared with Kristina Wagner)	General Hospital	Nominated	
1990	Soap Opera Digest Award	Outstanding Hero: Daytime	General Hospital	Nominated	
