= Lawrence Kasanoff =

American film producer (born 1959)

- Born: Lawrence Alan Kasanoff; June 1, 1959 (age 67); Boston, Massachusetts, U.S.
- Other name: Larry Kasanoff
- Education: Cornell University (BA); Wharton School of the University of Pennsylvania (MBA)
- Occupation: Film producer
- Website: larrykasanoff.com/

Lawrence Alan "Larry" Kasanoff (born June 1, 1959) is an American film producer who founded the Vestron Pictures genre subsidiary Lightning Pictures in 1986, Lightstorm Entertainment with James Cameron in 1990, and Threshold Entertainment in 1993.

== Career ==
Kasanoff graduated from Cornell University with a Bachelor of Arts degree, and later received a Master of Business Administration degree from University of Pennsylvania.

He is known for films such as the Mortal Kombat movie franchise including the 1995 Mortal Kombat, its 1997 sequel Mortal Kombat Annihilation and its spin-off series Mortal Kombat: Defenders of the Realm and Mortal Kombat: Conquest. He became involved with the franchise after working on Terminator 2 with Lightstorm Entertainment, which was overtaken by Mortal Kombat as the most successful arcade game in 1993. His company Threshold Entertainment was started with the purpose of producing the first Mortal Kombat film and other Mortal Kombat media spin-offs. Kasanoff later served as executive producer of the 2021 reboot of Mortal Kombat and its sequel.

Other films produced by Kasanoff include Blood Diner, Blue Steel, True Lies, and Lego: The Adventures of Clutch Powers. He also directed and produced the poorly-received 2012 Threshold Entertainment animated film Foodfight!, which was originally intended to be released in 2003.

In 2023, Kasanoff released a book titled A Touch of the Madness: How to Be More Innovative in Work and Life… by Being a Little Crazy.

In October 2025, Kasanoff and other entertainment industry veterans formed a new production venture called The Cartoon Coalition.

== Filmography ==
=== Films ===
Year	Film	Role	Notes
1987	Party Camp	Executive producer	
1987	Blood Diner	Executive producer	
1987	The Underachievers	Executive producer	Role: Studio Exec
1987	The Beat	Executive producer	
1988	You Can't Hurry Love	Executive producer	
1988	Dangerous Curves	Executive producer	
1989	Dream a Little Dream	Executive producer	
1989	C.H.U.D. II: Bud the C.H.U.D.	Executive producer	
1989	Far from Home	Executive producer	
1989	She's Back	Executive producer	
1990	Blue Steel	Executive producer	
1990	Class of 1999	Executive producer	
1990	A Gnome Named Gnorm	Executive producer	
1990	Ghoulies III: Ghoulies Go to College	Executive producer	Direct-to-video
1994	True Lies	Executive producer	
1995	Mortal Kombat	Producer	
1995	Mortal Kombat: The Journey Begins	Producer	Direct-to-video
1995	Strange Days	Executive producer	
1996	Mortal Kombat: Live Tour	Director	
1997	Mortal Kombat Annihilation	Producer, Story	
1999	Beowulf	Producer	
2009	Bionicle: The Legend Reborn	Executive producer	Direct-to-video
2011	Lego: The Adventures of Clutch Powers	Executive producer	Direct-to-video
2012	Marvel Super Heroes 4D	Executive producer	Short
2012	Foodfight!	Producer, director, screenwriter	Voice of Cheasel T. Weasel
2015	Ocean Quest: The Immersive Adventure	Executive producer	
2015	Mindfulness: Be Happy Now	Producer, director	Documentary
2020	Bobbleheads: The Movie	Producer	
2021	Mortal Kombat	Executive producer	
2026	Mortal Kombat II	Executive producer	

=== Television ===
Year	Film	Role	Notes
1991	The Making of 'Terminator 2: Judgment Day'	Executive producer	Documentary
1995	Mortal Kombat: Behind the Dragon	Executive producer	Documentary
1996	Mortal Kombat: Defenders of the Realm	Executive producer	
1998–1999	Mortal Kombat: Conquest	Executive producer	
2003	The Afterlife	Executive producer	TV movie
2010	Lego Atlantis: The Movie	Executive producer	TV Short
2011–2013	Hero Factory	Executive producer	
2012	Lego Star Wars: The Empire Strikes Out	Executive producer	TV Short
2013	Rockin' Rounds	Executive producer	
2013	3 Rounds With	Executive producer	
