= Open House (1987 film) =

1987 film directed by Jag Mundhra

- VHS released by Prism Entertainment Corporation
- Directed by: Jag Mundhra
- Screenplay by: David M. Evans
- Story by: Jag Mundhra
- Produced by: Sandy Cobe
- Starring: Joseph Bottoms; Adrienne Barbeau; Mary Stavin; Rudy Ramos; Robert Miano; Darwyn Swalve; Scott Thompson Baker
- Cinematography: Robert Hayes
- Edited by: Dan Selakovich
- Music by: Jim Studer
- Distributed by: Intercontinental Releasing Corporation
- Release date: October 1, 1987 (United States)
- Running time: 95 minutes
- Country: United States
- Language: English

Open House is a 1987 American slasher film directed by Jag Mundhra and written by David M. Evans from Mundhra's original story. It stars Joseph Bottoms as a radio psychologist and Adrienne Barbeau as a real estate agent, who are under threat by a serial killer.

== Plot ==
A teenage girl who was molested by her father calls David Kelley, a radio psychologist working for KDRX, and shoots herself on the air. Later, a real estate broker shows off a house to prospective buyers, and discovers the decomposing remains of another realtor in the washroom, the fourth victim of a psychopath dubbed the "Open House Killer". Outside Grant Real Estate, which David's girlfriend Lisa runs, someone digs through the trash, and takes discarded Seller Listings. The vagabond goes to one of the listed houses, and murders the realtor and buyer inside with a plunger that has had razor blades attached to it. The Open House Killer (who gives his name as "Harry") then calls David at KDRX, and opines that his victims deserved their fates.

After an open house, Harry breaks into the property, and electrocutes the realtor with frayed wires. As Harry continues to make rambling calls to KDRX, a detective named Arnold Shapiro is assigned to work with the station to try and track Harry down. In an attempt to protect their employees, the real estate agencies institute new safety precautions, though these do little to deter Harry, who murders another agent by hanging her.

Barney Resnick, Lisa's unscrupulous business rival, visits a prospective client, a dominatrix who agrees to sell her home through his agency if he has kinky sex with her. Harry follows Resnick, decapitates him with an axe, and snaps the neck of the home owner. The next day, Harry abducts Lisa, who gives cryptic hints about her whereabouts when Harry calls KDRX to taunt David. David tracks Lisa and Harry to an empty house, and as the authorities swarm the building, Harry expresses disappointment over the media not being present, and rants about how corporations and the real estate industry drove him to kill, as they made it so he could never have a place he could call his own

Just as Harry is about to slit Lisa's throat, he is shot and knocked through a glass door by Detective Shapiro. Despite the severity of his injuries, Harry still tries attacking, and is finally killed when Shapiro knocks him off a balcony.

== Cast ==
- Joseph Bottoms as Doctor David Kelley
- Adrienne Barbeau as Lisa Grant
- Mary Stavin as Katie Thatcher
- Rudy Ramos as Rudy Estevez
- Scott Thompson Baker as Joe Pearcy
- Darwyn Swalve as Harry
- Robert Miano as Detective Arnold Shapiro
- Page Moseley as Toby
- Johnny Haymer as Paul Bernal
- Leonard Lightfoot as TJ
- Barry Hope as Barney Resnick
- Stacey Adams as Tracy
- Roxanne Baird as Allison
- Tiffany Bolling as Judy Roberts

== Reception ==
Moria gave Open House a zero, and stated that while it was more ambitious than most other slashers of the time and had an intriguing antagonist, it was still "a very poor film" that was dully directed, flatly photographed, and failed to generate any real suspense. Hysteia Lives! found the film "unrelentingly tedious" and gave it a one out of five, writing "Despite a few cheesy flourishes, Open House is a snoozer of the first order".
