= Tracy Douglas =

- Born: 1970 (age 55–56)
- Citizenship: United States
- Education: National University (BA); University of Wisconsin–Whitewater (MS)
- Occupations: Actress; businesswoman; Therapist
- Years active: 1992–present
- Spouse: Robert Jarzen
- Children: 4

Tracy Douglas (born 1970) is an American therapist, businesswoman, and former actress. She is the founder of Your GenX Therapist, The Hair Forge, and Kith & Kinship. She is also known for her acting career in the 1990s, including her role as Vorpax in the syndicated television series Mortal Kombat: Conquest.

== Early life and education ==
Douglas was born in the Philippines (1970), and raised in Milton, Wisconsin to a Filipino American family.

Douglas attended Beloit College from 1987 to 1989. She later earned a Bachelor of Arts in psychology from National University in La Jolla, California, in 2007 and a Master of Science in counselor education from the University of Wisconsin–Whitewater in 2013.

== Career ==
=== Acting and modeling ===
Douglas began her acting career in 1992 as an extra in the Eddie Murphy film Boomerang, in which she was credited as "Attractive Woman." She later appeared in television series including The Sinbad Show (1993), American Playhouse (1993), Hangin' with Mr. Cooper (1994), The Watcher (1995), The Single Guy (1996), Malcolm & Eddie (1997), and Silk Stalkings (1997). Her film credits include Backfire! (1995), in which she was credited as Tracy Douglass, and Shadow of Doubt (1998).

From 1998 to 1999, Douglas played Princess Vorpax in 17 episodes of the syndicated fantasy series Mortal Kombat: Conquest, based on the Mortal Kombat video game franchise. The character was the daughter of Queen Kreeya. After the series was canceled, Douglas appeared in the television film Santa and Pete (1999) and the UPN series One on One (2002).

Douglas later moved behind the camera, producing and writing the short film One Wee World Celebrates Mexico (2006), in which she also appeared as Ambassador Tracy. She later appeared in the short films Fruit Loops (2009), which she co-produced, and Written Off (2010), both created for the Madison 48 Hour Film Project.

=== Therapy and business ===
After leaving the acting industry, Douglas returned to Wisconsin and trained as a mental health counselor. She later founded Your GenX Therapist, a Janesville-based practice that provides in-person therapy in Wisconsin and telehealth services in Wisconsin and Texas.

In 2023, Douglas co-founded The Hair Forge, a Janesville-based hair-accessories company for men, with her sons Max and Rider Jarzen, her husband Robert Jarzen, and her nephew Jeremiah Mansavage.

Douglas is also the founder of Kith & Kinship, a video production venture that creates "cooking video legacies" by filming clients preparing family recipes and combining the footage with photographs and personal stories to create digital culinary heirlooms.

== Personal life ==
Douglas lives in Janesville, Wisconsin, with her husband, Robert Jarzen, to whom she has been married for more than 30 years. They have four children, one biological and three adopted through the foster care system. She is licensed as a professional counselor in Wisconsin and Texas.
