= Hollywood Hot Tubs =

1984 film by Chuck Vincent

- Film poster
- Directed by: Chuck Vincent
- Written by: Mark Borde; Craig Horrall
- Produced by: Mark Borde; Seymour Borde; Colleen Meeker
- Starring: Paul Gunning; Donna McDaniel; Michael Andrew; Jewel Shepard
- Cinematography: Larry Revene
- Edited by: Michael B. Hoggan
- Music by: Joel Goldsmith
- Distributed by: Seymour Borde & Associates
- Release date: September 7, 1984
- Country: United States
- Language: English

Hollywood Hot Tubs is a 1984 comedy film starring Paul Gunning, Donna McDaniel, Michael Andrew and Jewel Shepard and directed by Chuck Vincent.

== Plot ==
A teenager gets in trouble for vandalizing the Hollywood Sign and goes to work for his uncle's hot tub repair business rather than go to prison. The nephew falls in love with a secretary at his uncle's company, but risks losing her when caught in compromising situations while performing his duties as a hot tub repairman.

== Sequel ==
There was a sequel film made in 1989 starring Jewel Shepard, Hollywood Hot Tubs 2: Educating Crystal. Variety said in its review of the film, "Shepard comes into her own here in a funny and sympathetic role. It’s not quite Educating Rita, but the formula of gawky ingenue blossoming is a sure-fire one."
