= Darwyn Swalve =

American film, stage and television actor

- Swalve in Police Academy 6: City Under Siege, 1989
- Born: Darwin Swalve; August 20, 1946; Belmond, Iowa, U.S.
- Died: May 5, 1999 (aged 52); Riverside, California, U.S.
- Occupations: Film, stage and television actor

Darwin Swalve (August 20, 1946 – May 5, 1999) was an American film, stage and television actor. He was best known for playing Ox, an ostensibly comic man mountain who fought Lieutenant Moses Hightower (Bubba Smith) in the 1989 film Police Academy 6: City Under Siege.

== Life and career ==
Swalve was born in Belmond, Iowa. At the age of seven, he and his family moved to California. He served in the United States Marine Corps until his discharge in 1968. He worked as a construction worker, and he performed in a stage production in Southgate, California in 1978. He began his screen career in 1984, appearing in the film City Heat. In 1985, he appeared in the film City Heat.

Later in his career, Swalve guest-starred in television programs including Jake and the Fatman, The A-Team and Moonlighting. In 1989, he played Ox, an ostensibly comic man mountain who fought Lieutenant Moses Hightower (Bubba Smith) in the film Police Academy 6: City Under Siege. He also appeared in films such as Summer School, Open House, Arizona Heat, My Summer Story, Dead Bang, Barton Fink and Heartbreak Ridge. He last appeared in the Nickelodeon television program The Journey of Allen Strange.

== Death ==
Swalve died on May 5, 1999, of a heart attack in Riverside, California, at the age of 52.
