= Rest in Pieces (film) =

1987 Spanish/U.S.-made slasher film

- Spanish release poster
- Spanish: Descanse en piezas
- Directed by: José Ramón Larraz
- Screenplay by: Santiago Moncada
- Produced by: José Frade
- Starring: Scott Thompson Baker; Lorin Jean Vail; Dorothy Malone
- Edited by: José Antonio Rojo; Brian Smedley-Aston
- Production company: Calepas International
- Distributed by: LIVE Entertainment (U.S.)
- Release date: 10 August 1987 (Spain)
- Running time: 90 minutes
- Country: Spain
- Language: English

Rest in Pieces (Spanish: Descanse en piezas) is a 1987 horror film directed by José Ramón Larraz and starring Scott Thompson Baker, Lorin Jean Vail, and Dorothy Malone. Its plot follows a young wife and her husband who inherit her wealthy aunt's mansion, only to find the home harbors dark secrets.

== Plot ==
Helen Hewitt inherits a sprawling Pennsylvania estate from her wealthy, eccentric aunt Catherine Boyle, who commits suicide by ingesting strychnine, an act which she records on video. After paying their respects, and a subsequent incident where Catherine's ashes escape from her urn and blow onto the grounds of the estate, Helen and her ex-tennis pro husband, Bob, move from Los Angeles to the estate. Upon arriving, they find it inhabited by various friends of Catherine's who reside in the numerous buildings on the property. Among them are a live-in maid, Lisa; an ex-military man; a blind concert pianist, David Hume; a mysterious doctor Anderson; Gertrude Stein; the brutish Jack Ritchy; Whitmore, a writer; and the Reverend Faherty.

Catherine allegedly left $8 million in cash hidden on the property, but kept its location a secret. Bob searches for the money, and in the basement, finds piles of rotten food infested with rats. Bob learns from Helen that her Aunt Catherine was regarded as mentally ill by her family, and that she was at one time institutionalized.

The houseguests hold a small recital concert featuring guest performers, unbeknownst to Bob and Helen. At the concert's end, they savagely murder the unsuspecting musicians, cut up the bodies, and dispose of them and their instruments piece by piece in a furnace, revealing themselves to be part of a death cult. Meanwhile, Helen is plagued by bizarre apparitions of her aunt Helen, and finds that her belongings are continually moved around. Helen becomes convinced her aunt's houseguests are attempting to drive them away, and eventually comes to believe them to be ghosts. Bob confronts the six houseguests, who remain dedicated to Catherine and assure him they have no interest in the money, though they claim to know where it is hidden.

The group of houseguests gather in the parlor and each light a candle. As the flames each inexplicably extinguish, the Reverend asserts that it is Catherine communicating with them. Meanwhile, Bob summons Louis, an attorney, to the house, but he is stopped on the road by David, who stabs him to death. Helen is confronted by the houseguests in the swimming pool of the home. When Bob tries to come to her rescue, Lisa and Gertrude stab him to death before sedating Helen.

Helen awakens and the cultists inform her that they are only following Catherine's instructions. Dr. Anderson reveals that he was a doctor at the hospital in which Catherine was institutionalized, and that the other houseguests were all patients as well, each who committed suicide. The cultists chase Helen through the property, again incapacitating her. When she awakens again, she wanders through the house, which now appears empty. Downstairs, she finds Bob sitting before the fireplace, and passes out from fright. It is revealed that Bob has made a deal with the houseguests, who promise him the $8 million if they can coerce Helen to commit suicide.

As the cultists attempt to force Helen to slash her wrists, Bob, riddled with guilt, sabotages the gathering. A fight breaks out, during which Helen slashes Gertrude's throat, killing her, before she and Bob flee. A short time later, while on the plane back to Los Angeles, Helen notices Lisa and Louis seated next to her. As she observes the seats around her, she finds herself again surrounded by the cultists, and to top it all off Catherine also appears to be among the passengers.

== Cast ==
- Scott Thompson Baker as Bob Hewitt
- Lorin Jean Vail as Helen Hewitt
- Dorothy Malone as Catherine Boyle
- Jack Taylor as David Hume
- Patty Shepard as Gertrude Stein
- Jeffrey Segal as Dr. Anderson
- Fernando Bilbao as Jack Ritchy
- Antonio Ross as Whitmore
- Robert Case as Reverend Faherty
- Carole James as Lisa
- Tony Isbert as Louis

== Release ==
The film was released on VHS in the United States on March 10, 1988 by LIVE Entertainment, and reissued on August 11 to take advantage of the Halloween season. The film was released on Blu-ray via Vinegar Syndrome on Oct 27, 2020.
