= Party Camp =

1987 film by Gary Graver

- Directed by: Gary Graver
- Written by: Paul Brown
- Produced by: Mark Borde; Lawrence Kasanoff; Colleen Meeker
- Starring: Andrew Ross; Kerry Brennan; Billy Jayne; Jewel Shepard; April Wayne; Peter Jason
- Cinematography: Gary Graver
- Edited by: Michael B. Hoggan
- Music by: Dennis Dreith
- Distributed by: Lightning Pictures Inc. Vestron Video
- Release date: 1987
- Running time: 87 minutes
- Country: United States
- Language: English

Party Camp is a 1987 American comedy film directed by Gary Graver and written by Paul Brown. The plot revolves around a teenager (Andrew Ross) who takes a job as a summer camp counselor, only to spend the whole experience partying and engaging in hijinks.

== Plot ==
Camp counselor and party animal Jerry Riviera (Andrew Ross) has seen the girl of his dreams in Heather Morris (Kerry Brennan) at summer camp. Unfortunately, the strict regimen of his camp experience is not what he imagined. So, with the help of his group of young misfit campers, wiseguy Riviera sets out to buck authority and turn the experience into a non-stop party-like atmosphere.

== Cast ==
- Andrew Ross as Jerry Riviera
- Kerry Wall as Heather Morris (credited as Kerry Brennan)
- Dean R. Miller as Cody
- Billy Jayne as District Attorney (credited as Billy Jacoby)
- Jewel Shepard as Dyanne Stein
- Kirk Cribb as Tad Whitneyworth
- Peter Jason as "Sarge"
- Cherie Franklin as Mrs. Beadle
- April Jayne as Nurse Brenda (credited as April Wayne)
- Troy Shire as Les
- Eric Smith as Paul
- Jon Pine as Ned
- Corky Pigeon as Winslow
- Kevin Telles as Ferris
- Paula Irvine as Devi
- Stacy Baptist as Kelly
- Betsy Chasse as Lisa
- Kristina Wotkyns as Jessica
- Marsha McClelland as Miss Hollywood
