= Christina (1984 film) =

- Directed by: Francisco Lara Polop
- Written by: Harry Alan Towers
- Produced by: Harry Alan Towers
- Starring: Jewel Shepard; Karin Schubert
- Cinematography: Alejandro Ulloa
- Edited by: Antonio Ramírez de Loaysa
- Music by: Ted Scotto
- Release date: 1984
- Countries: Spain; United States
- Language: Spanish

Christina is a 1984 erotic B movie film, starring Jewel Shepard, Karin Schubert, produced and written by Harry Alan Towers and directed by Francisco Lara Polop. The film's original Spanish title was Christina y la reconversión sexual.

== Plot ==
Christina Von Belle, a wealthy heiress, is kidnapped by a lesbian terrorist group and held for ransom. She escapes the lesbian terrorists, only to fall into the clutches of a gang of gourmet chefs, who want a piece of the ransom themselves.

== Cast ==
- Jewel Shepard as Christina Von Belle
- Ian Serra as Patrick
- Enrique Johnson as Pablo (credited as Enrique Johson)
- Emilio Linder as Alain
- Tony Isbert as Max
- Carole James as Brigitte (credited as Pepita Full James)
- Emiliano Redondo as Jean
- Helen Devon as Marie
- Anne-Marie Jensen as Emily
- Karin Schubert as Rosa
- Josephine Jaqueline Jones as Antoinette
