= Threshold Entertainment =

Digital animation studio

Threshold Entertainment Group
- Logo used since 2020
- Industry: Film
- Founded: 24 April 1993; 33 years ago
- Founder: Larry Kasanoff
- Headquarters: Santa Monica, California, United States
- Key people: Larry Kasanoff (CEO)
- Website: www.thresholdentertainment.com

Threshold Entertainment Group, also known as Threshold Entertainment, and Threshold Digital Research Labs is an American intellectual property company. Its animation subsidiary, Threshold Animation Studios, produces films. Larry Kasanoff is the company's chief executive officer (CEO) after previously serving as president for Lightstorm Entertainment, a company he co-founded with entrepreneur and filmmaker James Cameron. The company was originally founded in 1993 after he left Lightstorm Entertainment.

== Threshold Animation Studios ==
Threshold Animation Studios has produced several CGI projects:

=== Theme park films ===
- DC Comics' Justice League (still in production)
- Star Trek 4D – Las Vegas Hilton
- Armageddon – Les Effets Speciaux – Disneyland Paris
- Mission: Space – Epcot's Walt Disney World Resort (Original 2003-2017 ride film)
- Hershey's Really Big 3D Show – Hershey's Chocolate World
- Bob the Builder 4D – Legoland
- Marvel Super Heroes 4D – Madame Tussauds
- Justice League: Alien Invasion 3D – animations for the amusement ride at Warner Bros. Movie World

=== Television specials ===
- Lego Star Wars: The Empire Strikes Out – Cartoon Network
- Lego: Atlantis – Cartoon Network
- The Afterlife – animated comedy pilot for Fox

=== Films ===
- Krazed For Karaoke - in co-production with GFM Animation and Syco Entertainment, in production.
- Bobbleheads: The Movie – released on home video by Universal Studios in December 2020.
- Foodfight! – released on DVD in the United States on May 7, 2013.
- Lego: The Adventures of Clutch Powers – released by Universal Studios in 2010.
- Bionicle: The Legend Reborn – released on home video by Universal Studios in September 2009.
- Hero Factory's Rise of the Rookies – premiered on Nickelodeon, released on DVD by Warner Bros. Discovery Home Entertainment.
- Beowulf - premiered by Dimension Films in the United States on March 31, 1999 (as Threshold Entertainment Group).
- Mortal Kombat Annihilation – released in the United States on November 21, 1997 (as Threshold Entertainment Group).
- Mortal Kombat – released in the United States on August 18, 1995 (as Threshold Entertainment Group).

=== Unreleased Films ===
- Arcade - An animated film about video game characters. A similar film Wreck-It Ralph would be made by Disney in 2012.
- Mascots - An animated film about sports mascot characters.
- Duke Nukem - A live action film based on the video game character of the same name.
- Ninja Scroll - A live action film adaptation of the 1993 anime of the same name.
- Sunday Comics Capers - An animated film about comic strip characters.

=== Contributions to other media ===
- Win a Date with Tad Hamilton!
- Scary Movie
- I Still Know What You Did Last Summer
- The Faculty
- Dogma
- Edwurd Fudwupper Fibbed Big
- Jay and Silent Bob Strike Back
- Ace Ventura: Pet Detective
- Highlander: Endgame
- Gen Y Cops
- Impostor
- The Weight of Water
- From Dusk Till Dawn 3: The Hangman's Daughter
- The Producer
- Where Are The Toons Now
- United Artists logo (1994–2000)
