= Pinball arcade =

Pinball arcade may refer to:

- Amusement arcade, a place with pinball machines
- The Pinball Arcade, a pinball video game developed by FarSight Studios
- Microsoft Pinball Arcade, a pinball video game from Microsoft
- Pinball Arcade, a 1994 game by Spidersoft

== See also ==
- Arcade Pinball
