= Pinball Hall of Fame: The Gottlieb Collection =

2004 video game

- PAL region PS2 cover art
- Developer: FarSight Studios
- Publishers: NA: Crave Entertainment; EU: Play It
- Platforms: PlayStation 2 GameCube; PlayStation Portable; Xbox; Wii
- Release: 2004
- Genre: Pinball
- Modes: Single-player, multiplayer

Pinball Hall of Fame: The Gottlieb Collection is a pinball video game developed by FarSight Studios and published by Crave Entertainment. The tables featured in the game are recreations of real tables. A revised edition of the PlayStation 2 version of the game was later released as Gottlieb Pinball Classics in Europe and Australia by System 3 under their Play It label. This expanded version featured three additional tables, and was subsequently released in North America on the Wii and PlayStation Portable under its original title.

The Xbox version of Pinball Hall of Fame supported online leaderboards on Xbox Live until support was terminated in 2010. Despite this, the game is now has online support with Insignia, a revival server restoring online functionality to Xbox games.

== Development ==
After partnering with Crave Entertainment for a rolling puzzle game, Mojo!, the same game engine was then used for a series of pinball games based on physical machines. Initially hesitant to develop original pinball designs they met with Tim Arnold before he had established the Pinball Hall of Fame. On his advice that Gottlieb would be the easiest to obtain the license for a modest price this was the first of those games.

Tee'd Off took three times longer to create than any other table due to the complexity of the ROM and that this game doesn't implement ROM emulation. This also resulted in errors in the display and light sequencing.

== Tables ==
The following pinball machines are included in all versions of the game:

- Ace High (1957)
- Central Park (1966)
- Big Shot (1973)
- Genie (1979)
- Black Hole (1981)
- Victory (1987)
- Tee'd Off (1993)

The following extras are included in all versions of the game:

- Play-Boy (1932)
- Xolten (A fortune teller machine which predicts the player's future)
- Love Meter (A love tester machine which evaluates the player's dating eligibility)

The following are included in the PSP, Wii and Gottlieb Pinball Classics versions of the game:

- Goin' Nuts (1983)
- El Dorado City of Gold (1984)
- Strikes n' Spares (1995) (A redemption game)

The flyer and a short history of each table are included.

== Reception ==
Reception

Aggregate score
Aggregator	Score
Metacritic	63/100

Review scores
Publication	Score
GameSpot	NGC: 7.2/10; PS2: 7.2/10; XBox: 7.2/10; PSP: 7.1/10
IGN	5.5/10; WII: 7.5/10
Nintendo Life	8/10

Pinball Hall of Fame: The Gottlieb Collection received "mixed or average" reviews from critics, according to Metacritic. GameSpot gave the console versions a 7.2 out of 10 while the PlayStation Portable version was given a 7.1 out of 10. IGN found the Wii version recreated the tables well.

GameRoom magazine recommended the game, but noticed the ball occasionally left a flipper at an "impossible angle".

== Sequel ==
A sequel, titled Pinball Hall of Fame: The Williams Collection was released on the Nintendo 3DS, PlayStation 2, PlayStation 3, PlayStation Portable, Wii and Xbox 360 on February 26, 2008, September 22, 2009 and September 23, 2011 respectively.

== See also ==
- Pinball Hall of Fame
- Pinball Hall of Fame: The Williams Collection
- The Pinball Arcade
- Microsoft Pinball Arcade
