= TX-Sector =

1988 pinball machine

- Manufacturer: Gottlieb
- Release date: March 1988
- System: Gottlieb System 80B
- Design: John Trudeau
- Programming: John Buras
- Artwork: Constantino Mitchell, Jeanine Mitchell
- Production run: 2,336

TX-Sector is a pinball machine designed by John Trudeau and released by Gottlieb in 1988. The game features a sci-fi theme and revolves around raising the energy level to teleport the ball.

== Description ==
TX-Sector was one of only three pinball machines to use a Vitrigraph playfield besides the games Victory and Diamond Lady. The machine creates the illusion of teleporting the ball using staged balls that are hidden and released as needed. It was praised by Classic Game Room for its music and sound effects, which contributed to an increase in the machine's market value.

== Reception ==
In a retro review, Nudge Magazine found the game to have captivating rules, and a captivating main feature.

== Digital versions ==
TX-Sector is available as a licensed table on The Pinball Arcade for PC & Android since May 2016. This table is also available for PlayStation 3 and 4 since October 18, 2016. This table is also available on the Pinball Arcade on the Nintendo Switch.
