= Ace High =

Ace High may refer to:

- Ace High Band, USA Metal Band
- Ace High (1918 film), American Western film
- Ace High (1919 film), American Western film
- Ace High (1968 film) (It: I quattro dell'Ave Maria), 1968 Italian Western film
- ACE High, NATO communications system
- Ace high straight flush, poker card game hand
- Ace High (pinball), woodrail pinball machine released by Gottlieb in 1957

== See also ==
- Aces High (disambiguation)
