= Haunted House (pinball) =

1982 pinball machine

- Manufacturer: Gottlieb
- Release date: October 1982
- System: System 80
- Design: John Osborne
- Artwork: Terry Doerzaph
- Production run: 6,385

Haunted House is a pinball game released in October 31 1982 by Gottlieb. It was the first game with three playfields that the ball can move between, including one below the main playing surface. Haunted House was designed by John Osborne, with artwork by Terry Doerzaph. It is part of Gottlieb’s “System 80” series of pinball machines.

== Description ==
Haunted House has three playfields (a mini underground playfield, a main playfield, and an upper playfield.), eight flippers, at unique angles, four pop bumpers, two kick-out holes, a secret passage (a false target that drops down after impact to allow entrance to cellar.), a trap door that opens for ball, a lightning animation in the backglass and kicking bat targets. The lower playfield of Haunted House is accessible any time during the game, and the ball(s) can travel between all three playfields. Each playfield is themed to be a part of a haunted house, the main level being the main floor, the lower level being the cellar, and the upper level being the attic.

The ball can only be lost from the main playfield, as the ball draining on the attic or cellar playfields will always be returned to another playfield for play to continue.

== Sound effects ==
Haunted House employed segments of the Bach organ piece, Toccata and Fugue in D minor: during the game's start (the pronounced opening of the Toccata); during the game itself (a repeated playback of part of the Toccata where the tune alternates quickly between one fixed note and others within the D Minor key); and when the game ends (the famous ending of the Fugue).

== Reception ==
Game Machine listed Haunted House as the sixth most-successful flipper unit of the year in their June 1, 1983 issue.

== Digital versions ==
Haunted House is one of seven Gottlieb tables recreated and released in Microsoft Pinball Arcade in 1998.

Haunted House pinball is available as a licensed table of The Pinball Arcade for several platforms.

== See also ==
- Black Hole
