= Pacific Pinball Museum =

Museum in Alameda, California, United States

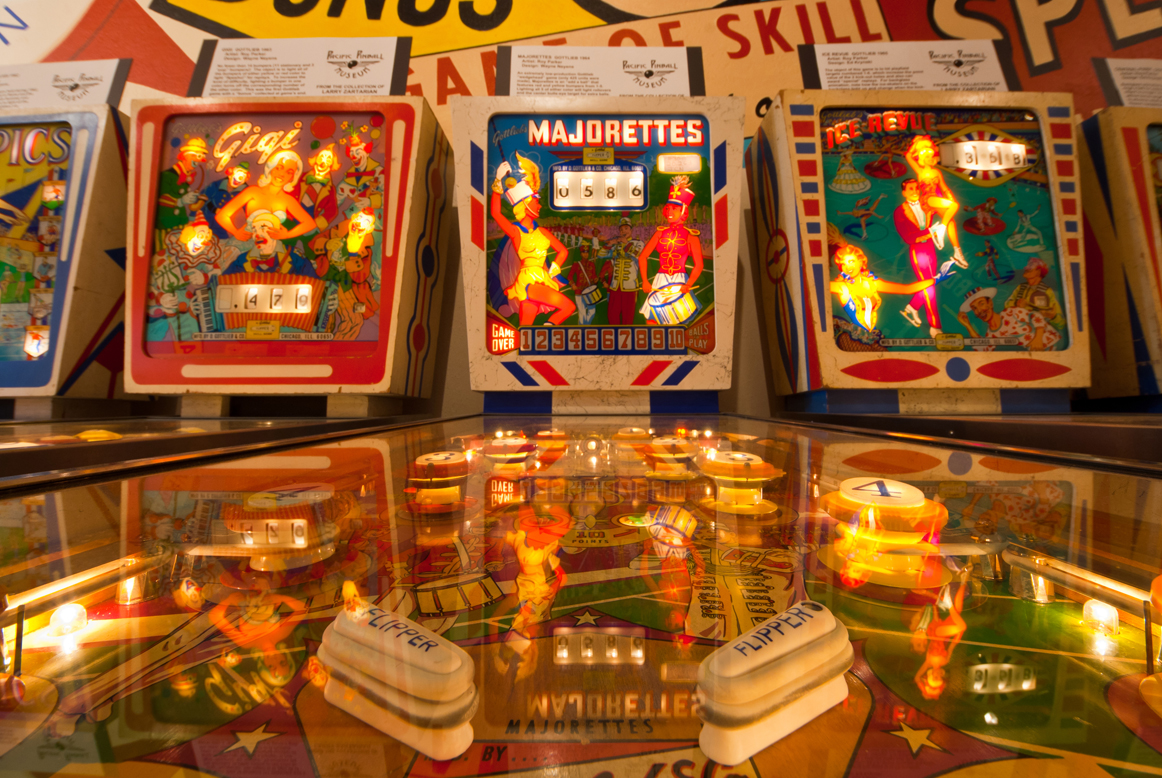
- The Majorettes pinball machine at the Pacific Pinball Museum

- Location of Pacific Pinball Museum in Alameda
- Established: 2004
- Location: 1510 Webster Street, Alameda, California, USA
- Coordinates: 37.773738°N 122.276583°W
- Type: Pinball machines
- Collection size: 1,300 Pinball Machines
- Founders: Michael Schiess & Melissa Harmon
- Executive director: Evan Phillippe
- President: Larry Zartarian
- Website: pacificpinball.org

The Pacific Pinball Museum is a 501(c)(3) nonprofit interactive museum and arcade in Alameda, California. The museum has a chronological and historical selection of rare bagatelles and early pinball games in addition to over 100 playable pinball machines. The machines range in era from the 1940s to present day.

Throughout the 7,000 square feet (650 m^{2}) museum are hand-painted murals, vintage jukeboxes, educational handouts and rotating focused exhibits. There are also provisions for field-trips, self guided tours, educated docents and STEAM educational programs as part of the museum's "Play & Learn" philosophy.

== History ==
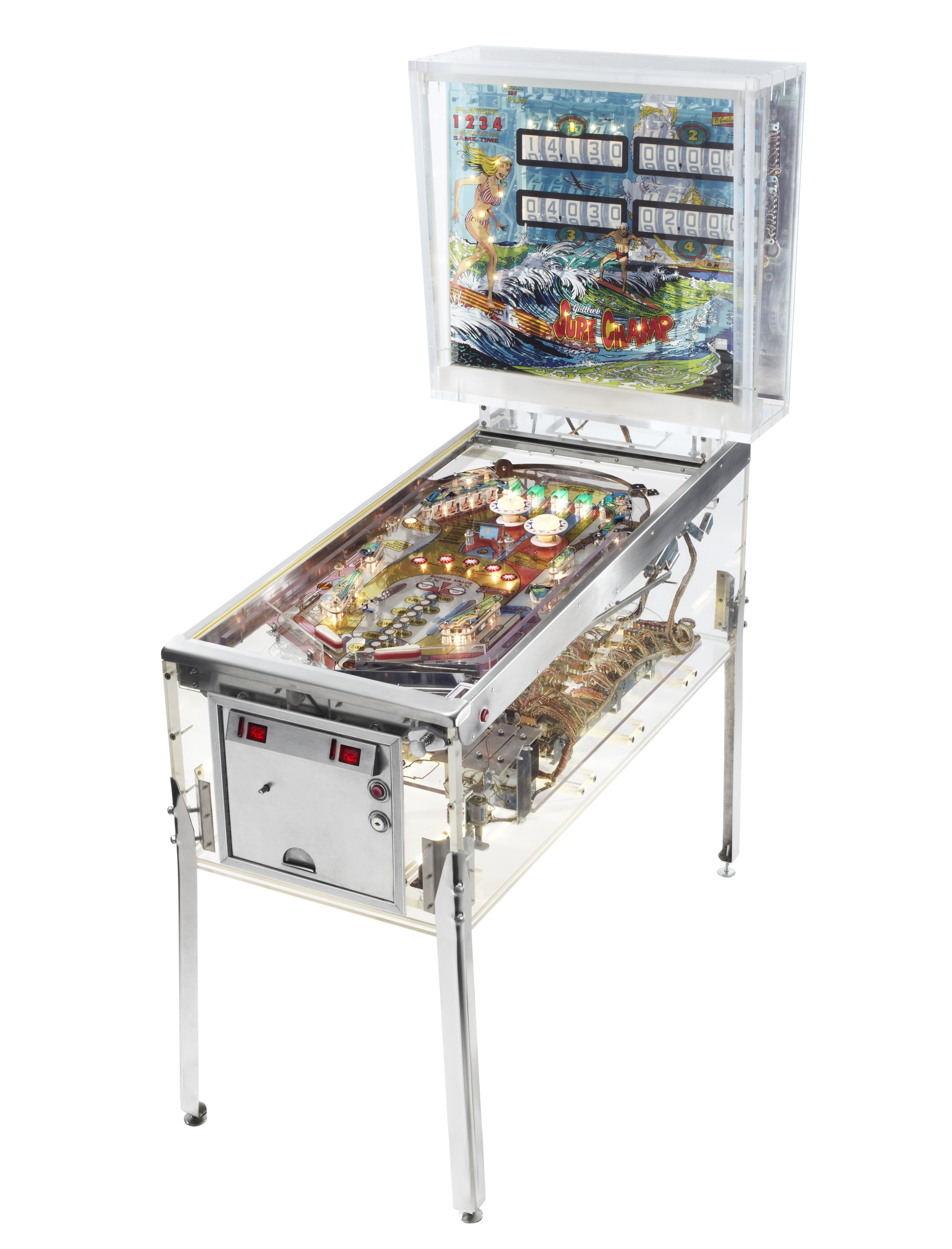
The visible pinball machine, co-created by museum owner Michael Schiess based on the pinball machine Surf Champ by Gottlieb from 1976

The museum was founded in 2004 by Michael Schiess, a former museum exhibition designer. Schiess started collecting pinball machines in 2001. He decided to open his own museum after being unimpressed with the coverage of pinball history at other museums. One the first major acquisitions was thirty-six machines in one purchase. Fourteen of them were installed in a rented buildings rear parking lot facing room, which Schiess called "Lucky Ju Ju", in Alameda and a jar was placed out for donations. In 2004 the facility grew and became a nonprofit, renaming itself the Pacific Pinball Museum. The museum expanded in 2009 to display forty woodrail and wedge head machines from the collection of Larry Zartarian. The museum has a gift shop that sells pinball themed merchandise, books and a variety of Pacific Pinball Museum branded shirts, hats and stickers.

An attempt was made to raise $4M to renovate Alameda's Carnegie library building and secure a 30-year lease. This plan was later changed to raise funds to purchase a building.

== Collection ==
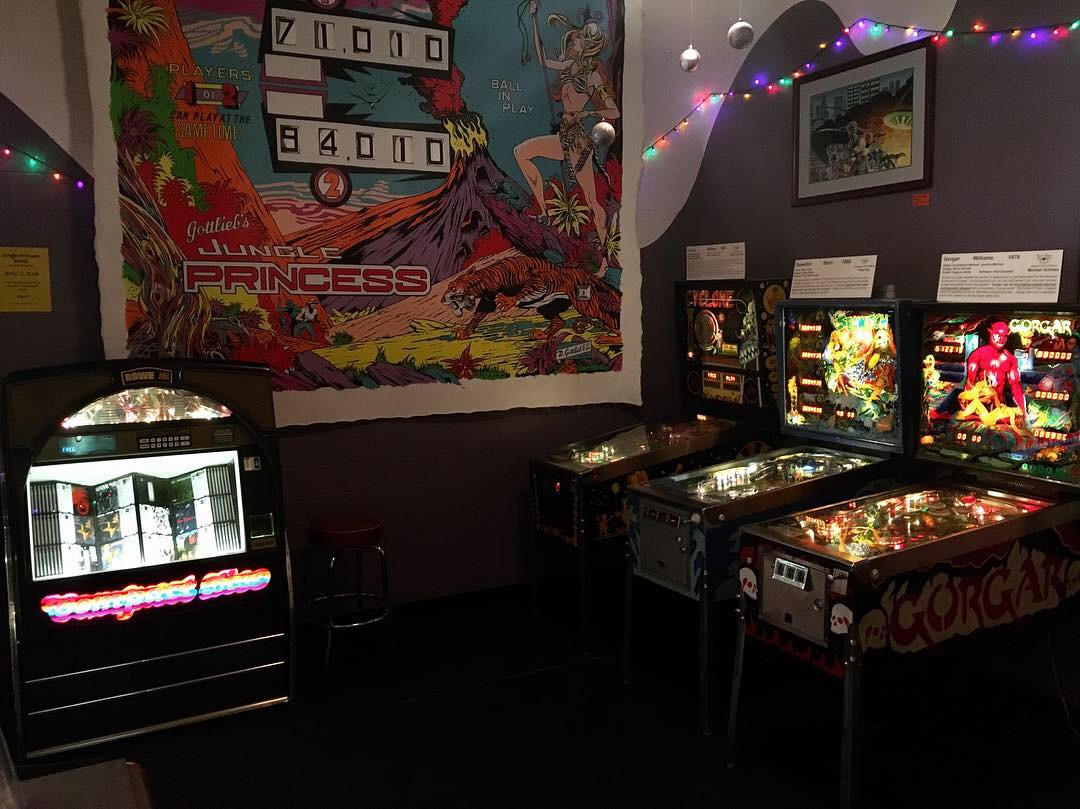
Exhibition Room #2 detail w/Jukebox

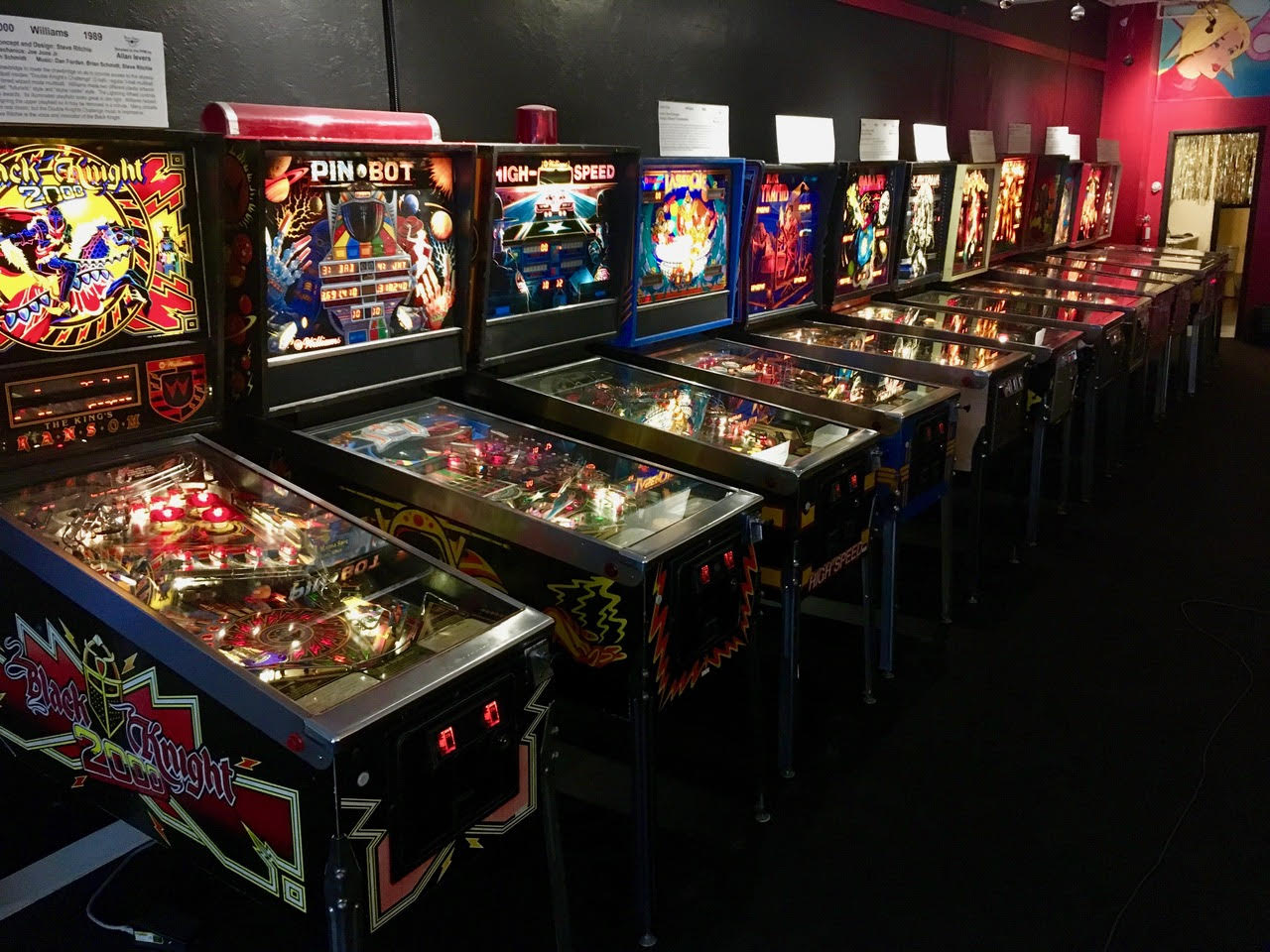
Left flank of the Modern Room at the Pacific Pinball Museum

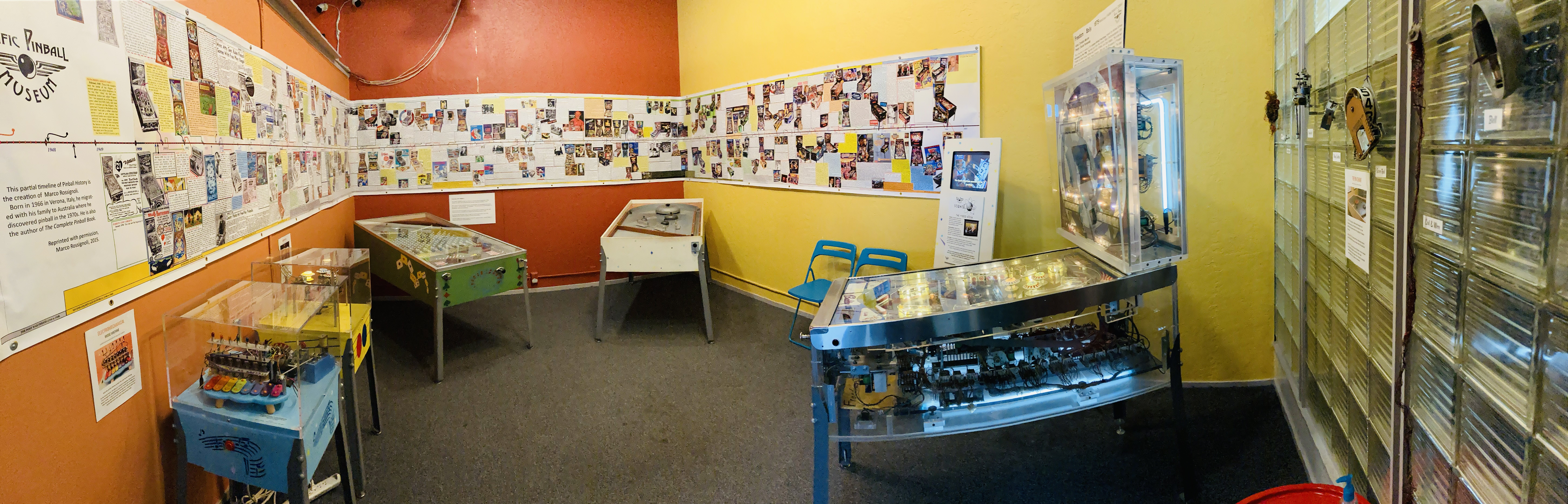
Panorama of the Pacific Pinball Museums Science Room

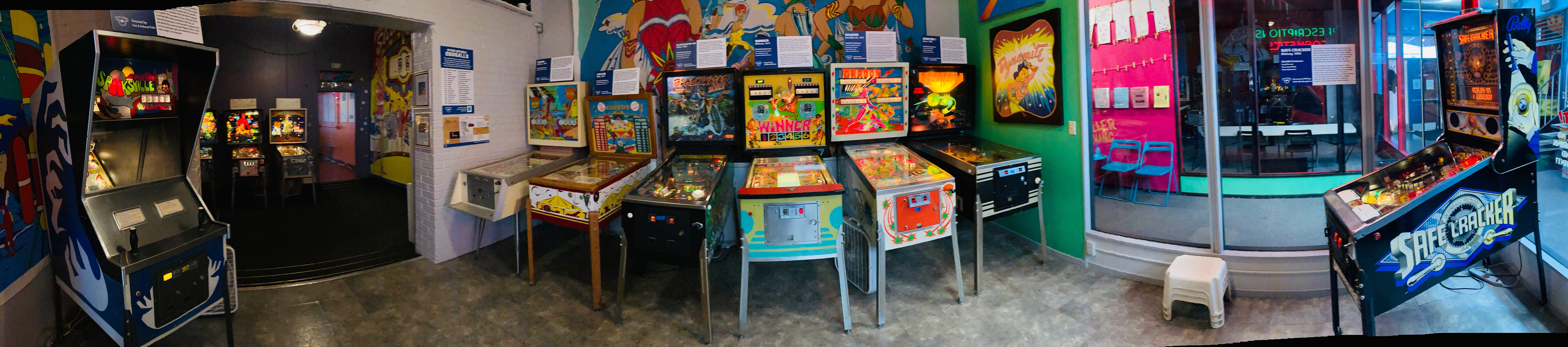
Panorama of the Pacific Pinball Museums Oddball - Experiments in Pinball Exhibit

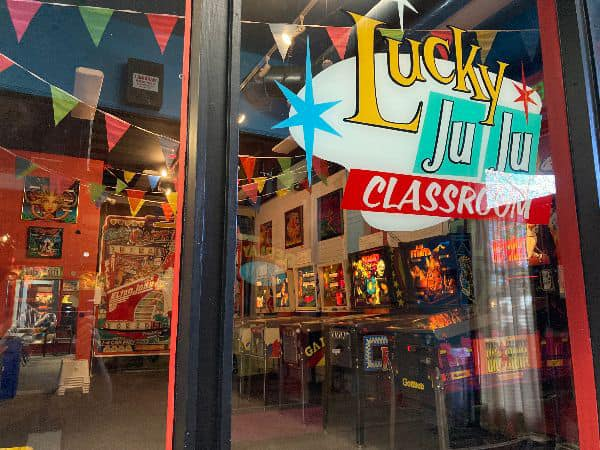
Lucky JuJu Room at the Pacific Pinball Museum

The museum's exhibitions include approximately ninety playable pinball machines and additional static display pins ranging in age from 1879 until modern day. They are arranged in chronological order in the museums rooms. In total, the museums collection comprises over 1,100 unique machines. Those not on display are maintained at the 8,000-square-foot Pacific Pinball Annex nearby. Upon paying the admission fee, visitors can play any of the machines on display for the day with unlimited in and out privilege's to take breaks and get food nearby. The oldest machine on display, from 1879, is a Montague Redgrave Parlor Bagatelle. One of the special games housed (and playable) in the museum is Gottlieb's Humpty Dumpty from 1947, the first game with flippers. Contemporary machines include The Addams Family and the Twilight Zone. The museum also has a transparent pinball machine from 1976 that was built by Schiess and Wade Krause. It is based on the Gottlieb "Surf Champ" game. One of the most valued pieces in the collection is a 1936-era Art Deco machine called the Bally Bumper. The machine was seized by police in Oakland during a gambling crackdown. The museum's collection has also been displayed at San Francisco International Airport.

Collections donated to the museum include Gordon Hasse's Gottlieb woodrail machines in 2009, consisting of all single player games released between 1945 and 1960, a total of over 220 machines. In 2012 Richard Foos, one of the founders of Rhino Records, donated his collection of nearly 50 machines. Richard Conger pledged machines from his collection.

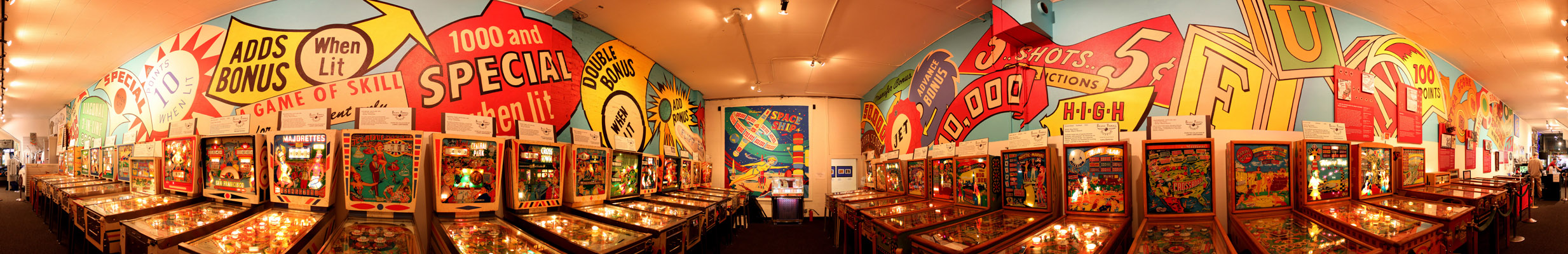
Panorama of Pacific Pinball Museums History Room

== Exhibits ==
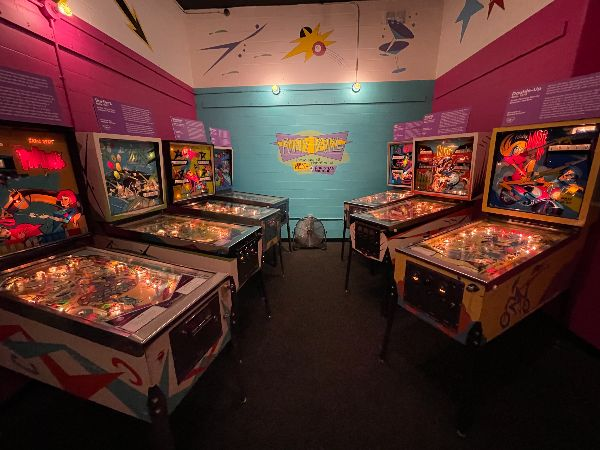
Pointy People One of the current exhibits at the Pacific Pinball Museum examining the artwork of Jerry Kelley and Christian Marche

In addition to the playable games, the museum also maintains a permanent exhibit of early bagatelles and pinball machines from 1879 to the late 1930s showing the evolution of the game over time as well as special curated rotating exhibits. All legacy exhibits are available on the museums website for perusal.

- Pointy People Current exhibit from August 21, 2020 - Present Taking on a new aesthetic in the mid-1960s, the style referred to as Pointy People is characterized by angular, abstracted figures. A stark contrast to the older more realistic style that dominated pinball art since the 1940s.
- The Art of Arthur Stenholm May 25, 2017 - March 13, 2020 Beginning in 1964, Arthur "Art" Stenholm created amazing pinball game artwork for Williams, Gottlieb, and Bally for decades. Stenholm's art is distinct especially when it comes to his portrayal of women in pinball art as strong, empowering active participants.
- Gambling, Amusement, or Both? Current exhibit from March 1, 2019 to Present This exhibit explores the history of pinball, its roots in gambling and adult-oriented entertainment, and the social forces surrounding its explosive rise in popularity.
- Pinball Style July 2, 2010 - August 1, 2010 Pinball Style: Drama and Design is an exhibition with commentary on clothing styles in pinball art from the 1940s through the 2000s. Curator Melissa Harmon looks at dramatic and historical context with a touch of fashion police humor.

The first Expo show took place in 2006.

== Traveling exhibitions ==
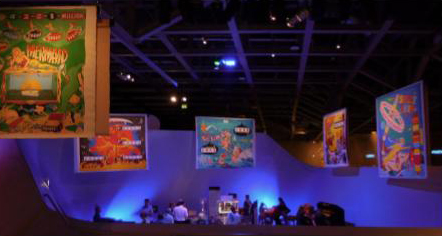
Ausgeflippt! Pacific Pinball Museums Mural and Machine Exhibition in Wolfsburg, Germany 2015

The Pacific Pinball Museums machines, backglass murals, and educational exhibits have made appearances in museums and galleries around the world. A few notable places the collection has traveled are:

- The Art and Science of Pinball Chabot Space and Science Center, Oakland, CA 2017
- Pinball! An Exhibition of Vintage Pinball Machines Museum of American Heritage, Palo Alto, CA: 2016
- Ausgeflippt! Phaeno Museum, Wolfsburg, Germany 2015
- Permanent Exhibition: Transparent Pinball Machine Exploratorium, San Francisco: 2012–Present
- From Bagatelle to Twilight Zone San Francisco Airport Museum: 2009, 2010
- The Silver Ball and the Golden Gate: Pinball Celebrates San Francisco SF Historical Society, 2026-2027

== Mural Program ==
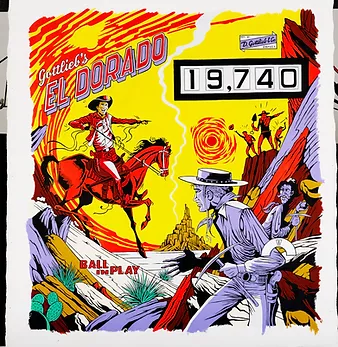
El Dorado by muralist Eric J. Kos (Original game artwork by Gordon Morison)

The Pacific Pinball Mural Program was born when local Bay Area artist Dan Fontes reproduced the “Majorettes” backglass in large-scale form for the Pacific Pinball Exposition at the Marin County Civic Center in 2007. Since then, professional artists Ed Cassel, d’Arci Bruno and Eric J. Kos joined the mural team, and together they have produced over 30 large-scale interpretations of some of the finest works in pinball history. In August 2012, the Pacific Pinball Museums muralists received a matching grant from the East Bay Community Foundation, a permanent endowment of charitable funds dedicated to improving the human condition in Alameda and Contra Costa counties. The murals are hand painted on medium weight quality canvas with artist grade latex paints, and represent hundreds of hours of work. Most measure approximately 10’ X 10’ square, and are priced by the artists. All sale proceeds benefit the artist and the museum. Those interested in purchasing murals can contact the museum for more information.

== Backglass Preservation Project ==
During the 15-month Pandemic shutdown, the Pacific Pinball Museum embarked on a historical cataloging and preservation project to bring the museum's collection to patrons virtually; a massive undertaking of photographing each machine in the collection (over 1000 games), and capturing the artwork of many rare machines in studio quality high resolution. Museum leadership said, "The goal is to provide these images as a resource for both pinball fans and academic scholars alike," and said it "believes that pinball artwork can educate patrons about American history and culture, and feels that it's so important to preserve and share our collection with the public - especially when hands-on play is hard to come by." A sample of the progress is available on the museum's website searchable by keywords, game title, manufacturer or production year.

== Pacific Pinball League ==
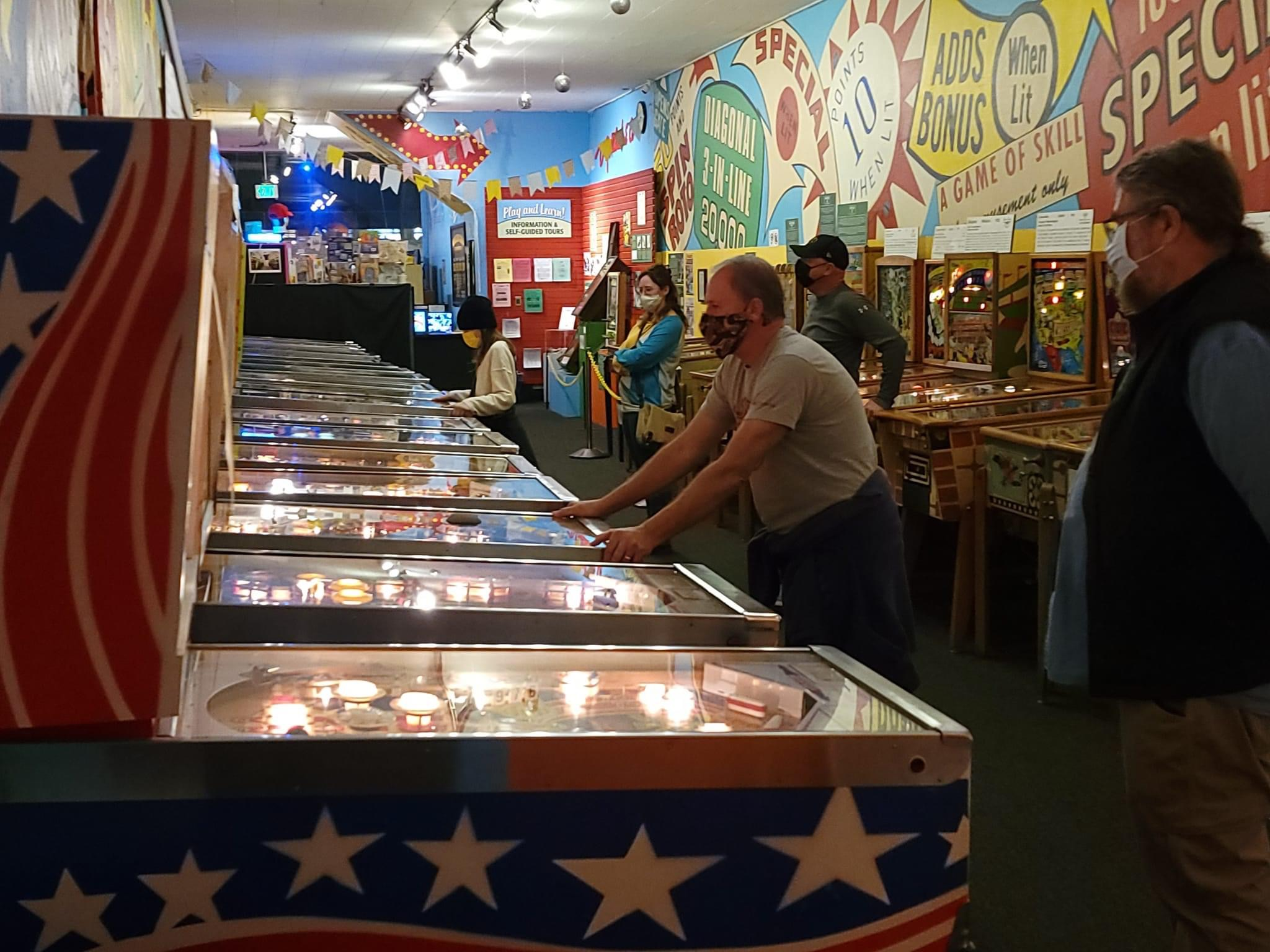
The Pacific Pinball League Playing a challenge in the History Room

The museum hosts the Pacific Pinball League on Wednesday nights beginning at 6:30PM. There are four seasons per year (with 10 weeks total per season ). Attending a minimum of three of eight regular weeks qualifies a player for Finals. League start dates are announced on the website, Pacific Pinball Social Media Accounts and the Pacific Pinball League Facebook page. Prospective players can join by coming to any league night, and the league is open to all ages and skill levels, even first-timers. Veteran players are available to show new players the basics and even some advanced skills. Players who compete in the Finals will have a World Pinball Player ranking.
