= Spirit of 76 (pinball) =

1975 pinball machine

- Manufacturer: Gottlieb
- Release date: December, 1975
- Design: Ed Krynski, Wayne Neyens
- Artwork: Gordon Morison
- Production run: 10,300 (Spirit of 76); 3625 (Pioneer) 300 (New York)

Spirit of 76 is a pinball game designed by Ed Krynski and Wayne Neyens and released in 1975 by Gottlieb. It is the last game designed by Wayne Neyens. The pinball machine should not be confused with the pinball machine The Spirit of '76 by Mirco Games, Inc.

Two other versions of this pinball machine were released in 1976: Pioneer - a two-player version and New York - a special 2-player Add-a-ball version in celebration of the 1976 lifting of the ban of pinball in New York City.

== Design ==
The pinball game Spirit of 76 was made to celebrate the 200th birthday of the United States. Competing manufacturers made similar machines, with Williams releasing Liberty Bell, and Bally releasing Freedom. One of the designers, Wayne Neyens, received the 10,000th machine; due to the serial numbering starting at 3,001, this game had the serial number 13,000. This was later donated to the Pacific Pinball Museum.

The artwork uses predominantly red, white and blue, with stars throughout the game. The backbox includes an astronaut (representing John Glenn), Gemini and Apollo spacecraft, Spirit of St. Louis, a frontierman (bearing a strong resemblance to Daniel Boone), two drummers and a fifer.

Minutemen and covered wagons are included on the playfield plastics. Stars and stripes, representing the flag of the United States, are on the cabinet of the table.

== Layout and gameplay ==
The game uses a symmetrical layout, with a bank of four drop targets on either side of the machine spelling 1-7-7-6 and 1-9-7-6. a series of A-B-C-D-E rollovers are in various locations on the playfield. In the center of the machine is a kick-out hole. Completing the drop targets and/or rollovers lights this hole for double-bonus, extra ball, or a special. The inspiration for using a trio of awards is the three branches of Government: executive, legislative, and judicial.

== Digital version ==
This is one of seven Gottlieb tables recreated and released in Microsoft Pinball Arcade in 1998.
