= Aces High =

Aces High may refer to:

- Aces High (comics), a comic book series by EC Comics
- Aces High (video game), a combat flight simulator/massively multiplayer online game
- Aces High (film), a 1976 film
- "Aces High" (music), an orchestral piece by Ron Goodwin, composed for the 1969 film Battle of Britain
- Aces High, a 1990 album by Commander Cody and His Lost Planet Airmen
- "Aces High" (song), a 1984 song by Iron Maiden
- Aces High Light Aircraft, a Canadian ultralight aircraft manufacturer
- Aces High, a minigame in Mario Party 3
- Aces High, a round in The Big Spin
- Aces Up, a solitaire game

== See also ==
- Ace High (disambiguation)
