= Tee'd Off =

1993 pinball machine

- Manufacturer: Gottlieb
- Release date: May 1993
- System: Gottlieb System 3
- Design: Ray Tanzer, Jon Norris
- Programming: Eugene Geer, Scott Slomiany
- Artwork: Constantino Mitchell, David Moore, Jeanine Mitchell
- Music: Dave Zabriskie
- Sound: Craig Beierwaltes
- Production run: 3,500

Tee'd Off is a 1993 Gottlieb pinball machine with layout designed by Ray Tanzer, and the ruleset by Jon Norris.

== Design and layout ==
The table is often compared to No Good Gofers by Williams and features a Caddyshack type theme. An animatronic gopher named Gunther shrug shoulders in sync with voice during game play and sometimes during attract mode at the top of the backbox and mocks the player.

The game has a hole in one shot at the top, a roulette wheel toy, 3 flippers, 1 pop bumper, 2 vertical upkickers, 3 slingshots, 2 kick-out holes, 2 bullseye targets, 1 four-bank drop target, 1 captive ball and 1 captive ball spinner below center of playfield.

== Gameplay ==
The main objective of the table is to complete all 9 holes in right order. The game includes a pitch and putt mini playfield and mini-games like find-the-gopher. After all holes are lit an award is given depending on how many times all holes have been completed. The game has 5 modes that are started by shooting the volcano when lit. Completing all modes lights the big score target.

There is a double or nothing feature when the player can wager their score in a timed round.

== Reception ==
An article in The Flipside found it fun to play, but the scoring to be heavily unbalanced. The inclusion of a buy-in system in this and other games was criticized.

== Digital versions ==
Tee'd Off is included in the Pinball Hall of Fame: The Gottlieb Collection.

It was released by the same developer for The Pinball Arcade on several platforms in 2013. Unlike the earlier game, this used ROM emulation which removed errors including on the DMD display, sounds, and light sequencing.
