= Stargate (pinball) =

1995 pinball machine

- Manufacturer: Gottlieb
- Release date: March 1995
- System: Gottlieb System 3
- Design: Ray Tanzer
- Programming: Allen Edwall
- Artwork: Constantino Mitchell
- Mechanics: Marion Czyz, Wesley Chang
- Music: Duane Decker
- Sound: Craig Beierwaltes
- Ruleset: Jon Norris
- Production run: 3,600

Stargate is a 1995 pinball game, designed by Ray Tanzer and Jon Norris and released by Gottlieb. The game is based on the film Stargate. It has many modes, including several multi-ball modes.

== Description ==
A "pyramid" is the main feature of this game. It has a top that opens by raising and lowering. A moving "Glidercraft" ship will be extended from the pyramid when the pyramid is open. The "Glidercraft" will zigzag left-right, in front of the pyramid, with about 90 degrees of horizontal movement.

This game also features two "Horus" targets. These are basically the reverse of drop targets: they are targets that, rather than dropping down into the playfield when hit, rise up into the air. Each target is attached to a large "Horus" structure, which is itself attached to a pivot that can raise and lower. These Horus structures drop down to block the player from reaching two key shots. The game occasionally raises them, allowing the player to temporarily make the shots. Part of the development involved having actor James Spader record the voice parts of the Stargate character Daniel Jackson.

The designer of the rules, Jon Norris, considered this game to have Ray Tanzer's best playfield layout.
