= Super Mario Bros. (pinball) =

1992 pinball game

- Manufacturer: Gottlieb
- Release date: April 25, 1992
- System: Gottlieb System 3
- Design: Jon Norris
- Programming: Rand Paulin, Daryl Moore, Allen Edwall
- Artwork: David Moore, Constantino Mitchell, Jeanine Mitchell
- Music: Dave Zabriskie
- Sound: Craig Beierwaltes
- Voices: Craig Brolley
- Concept: Nintendo
- Production run: 4,200

Super Mario Bros. is a 1992 four-player pinball machine developed by Gottlieb and licensed by Nintendo. It was released on April 25, 1992, and a total of 4,200 units was manufactured. Taito handled the machine's Japanese release and showed it off at JAMMA '92. It became one of America's top ten bestselling pinball machines of 1992, receiving a Gold Award from the American Amusement Machine Association (AAMA). A second pinball machine in the Super Mario Bros. series was released two months later in June, named Super Mario Bros. Mushroom World.

== Gameplay ==
The aim of the game is to become Super Mario by spelling "SUPER", which then allows the player to shoot for the castle, which has artwork of Bowser on the top. Destroying seven castles in seven different worlds rescues Princess Peach, and the player is then able to enter their name and score. They will receive a replay if the high score to date is beaten. All castles destroyed will be carried over to the next game. This makes it possible to begin a game with six castles, and the player will need to destroy only one to win. However, the score would be significantly lower in comparison to gameplay throughout all seven worlds. The player is initially given three balls, but more can be gained during play.

The game consists of six different rounds; Bomb, Mega Bumpers, Yoshi's Countdown, !, Castle Extra Ball, and Cave Count-Up. All rounds provide temporary objectives in the game that can reward points for completing certain tasks. In order to play a round, the player must light three shells, which can be done by hitting spot targets or ramp shots where shells are lit. After doing so, the player must obtain the Key by getting the ball into one of the three sinkholes when the Key light has been lit. The player can then select with the flippers which round they wish to play. If it is not selected within a few seconds, the system will choose whichever round the player is currently selecting. Entering a round as Super Mario doubles the value of that round, including extra balls. Each round lasts for only about a minute. Once a round has been completed, it cannot be played again during the same game. Completing all six rounds in a game lights Castle Special.

The game includes a platformer-style video mode, with the player using one button to move to the right, and the other to jump.

=== Playfield ===
The playfield includes three flippers, three pop bumpers, two vertical up-kickers, one standup target, two ramps, and an elevated mini-playfield.

== Development ==
Super Mario Bros. was designed by Jon Norris, with artwork by David Moore, Constantino Mitchell and Jeanine Mitchell. Despite the name "Super Mario Bros.", the machine shares a majority of its artwork with Super Mario World, released two years prior in 1990, and features Wart from Super Mario Bros. 2 and Bowser in his "King Koopa" design from the DIC Entertainment television cartoons in its backglass artwork. It was the first licensed pinball machine by Gottlieb, and the first Gottlieb pinball machine to include the dot-matrix display, a screen on the bottom of the lightbox that keeps track of the current score and can also display various animations during gameplay. The animations were done by Rand Paulin and Daryl Moore, the former of whom also programmed the machine along with Allen Edwall. The music was composed by Dave Zabriskie, with sound effects by Craig Beierwaltes. Jon Norris said that the game was designed more for younger players.

Mario's voice in the machine was speculated to have been done by Charles Martinet, who had begun performing the role in 1991; Martinet stated at a convention in June 2018 that he thought that Gottlieb stole his voice without compensating him or giving him credit. However, according to Zabriskie, Gottlieb hired Craig Brolley through Voices Unlimited to provide Mario's voice. Brolley had previously done voice-over work for Cactus Jack's, another pinball machine by Gottlieb.

== Reception ==
In Play Meter's equipment poll it first appeared at 14th in July 1992, rising to 6th in August 1992, but by December 1992 had fallen to 13th amongst the pinball games.

RePlay magazine said Premier was "enjoying its best pinball success in years"; the game was 8th in its Players Choice of pinball machines in August 1992.

A review for The Flipside anticipated that it would do well with younger and novice players, but unlikely to hold the interest of good players.
