= Central Park (pinball) =

1966 pinball machine

- Manufacturer: Gottlieb
- Release date: April 1966
- Design: Ed Krynski
- Artwork: Roy Parker
- Production run: 3,100

Central Park is a pinball machine that was released by Gottlieb in 1966. The game sold 3,100 units. It was designed by Ed Krynski, with the artwork by Roy Parker.

== Design ==
The artwork for the game is based on Central Park. The backglass shows the backdrop of Manhattan, and the foreground includes a 'park character', and a monkey ringing bell. The playfield shows relaxed visitors to the park in different situations, using predominantly yellow and green colors.

== Gameplay ==
Central Park has a large gap between the flippers, causing the ball to drain easily. The goal of the game is to raise a special called the Tree Bonus by collecting numbers. The player can collect numbers by hitting targets at the top of the playfield. Every time 100 points are scored in Central Park, an animated monkey on the backglass will ring a bell. Hitting the 7 and 9 lights up a bumper, earning 10 points instead of the usual 1. The 2 and 4 also lights up a bumper.

== Digital versions ==
Central Park is included in Pinball Hall of Fame: The Gottlieb Collection.

The table is available as a licensed table of The Pinball Arcade. The table is defaulted to five ball play.
