= Victory (pinball) =

1987 pinball machine

- Manufacturer: Gottlieb
- Release date: October 1987
- System: System 80B
- Design: John Trudeau
- Programming: John Buras
- Artwork: Constantino Mitchell, Jeanine Mitchell
- Sound: Dave Zabriskie
- Production run: 3,315

Victory is a John Trudeau designed 1987 solid state pinball machine by Premier and licensed under Gottlieb.

== Description ==
It was the first pinball machine to use a completely screened photo-realistic Vitrigraph process, printing the artwork onto the back of mylar. Earlier games used silk screen printing on the wood, with a hardcoat applied.

The game includes a "countdown bonus" feature, invented by Jon Norris.

== Gameplay ==
Victory is a driving themed game. The goal is to get the ball into all seven targets (or as the game refers to them, checkpoints) and finish the race by making the ball go through the checkered spinner.

== Reception ==
In a review for Play Meter, Roger Sharpe rated the game at 3.5/4. He found the game to be fun, challenging, and the best Gottlieb game for some time; expecting it to be a steady earner if an issue with the plunger was addressed.

The Pinball Trader found it to be a slightly above average game, but found the scoring could be unfair in some multiplayer games.

== Digital version ==
Victory is a playable table in Pinball Hall of Fame: The Gottlieb Collection as well as The Pinball Arcade on multiple platforms as a licensed table.
