= Rescue 911 (pinball) =

1994 pinball machine

'Rescue 911'
- Manufacturer: Gottlieb
- Release date: May 1994
- System: System 3
- Model #: Rescue 911
- Design: Bill Parker
- Artwork: Constantino Mitchell, David Moore, Jeanine Mitchell
- Music: Duane Decker
- Sound: Craig Beierwaltes
- Production run: 4,000

Rescue 911 is a pinball machine designed by Bill Parker and released by Gottlieb in 1994. The game is based on the TV show of the same name.

== Description ==
The gameplay features some disaster rescue scenarios, e.g. saving people from wildfires and flash floods and emergency medical missions such as delivering a parturient mother to a nearby hospital.

The playfield most notably includes a magnetic helicopter toy that can lift the ball from the ground. The wizard mode starts a light and sound show including an EKG heartbeat sound similar to the metamorphosis effects on Bride of Pinbot. The game does not have images or the voice of Rescue 911 TV show host William Shatner because Gottlieb did not get the rights from him. A planned reference was cancelled in an advanced state of development; as a result, four stand-up targets that should spell TREK are left empty.

== Gameplay ==
The player can call 911 by shooting the ball into a sinkhole about halfway up the playfield on the left hand side. After the machine instructs the player to, the player can then use the flipper buttons to lift the ball up so the helicopter toy can grab it using a magnet. The player can then use the flipper buttons again to drop the ball in different skill spots as it moves across the playfield. The Sinkhole that activates 911 calls may also lock the ball. After another ball is launched, the 911 call activates, and activates multiball.

== Reception ==
In its review, The Flipside found the modes to be repetitive and the display to miss crucial information. The helicopter and audio were appreciated. While better than recent releases from this company, the game was found to lack flow due to lack of orbits or any steeper ramps.

== Digital version ==
Rescue 911 released for The Pinball Arcade in 2016 for several platforms.
