= Class of 1812 (pinball) =

1991 pinball machine

- Manufacturer: Gottlieb
- Release date: August, 1991
- Design: Ray Tanzer, Joe Kaminkow
- Artwork: David Moore, Constantino Mitchell, Jeanine Mitchell
- Production run: 1,668

Class of 1812 is a pinball machine designed by Ray Tanzer and Joe Kaminkow and released in 1991 by Gottlieb. It features a supernatural monster theme and was advertised with the slogan "Frightful fun for all ages!".

== Description ==
During the design process the name of the game was changed from "Monster Mash" to Class of 1812 to save on licensing fees.

Class of 1812 has a dark theme featuring the reunion of a long dead class. The back glass is a vacuum formed 3D image. During Multiball Madness, a large mechanical beating heart and chattering teeth are synchronized along to chickens clucking the 1812 Overture by Pyotr Tchaikovsky.

The top of the playfield contains upper rollovers that advance bonus multiplier. The white target sequence advances the BAT-O-METER. Completing the left drop-targets lights the ball lock, then it is possible to lock the ball with the right ramp. Completing the C-O-F-F-I-N letters collects a 2,000,000 point jackpot. The playfield contains elements such as for example pop-bumpers, stationary targets, drop-targets, rollovers, ramps, saucer holes and spinners.

The back glass features an image of Lon Chaney from the infamous lost film London After Midnight.

== Digital versions ==
Class of 1812 is available as a licensed table of The Pinball Arcade for several platforms.

== See also ==
- Monster Bash (pinball)
