= Goin' Nuts =

Unreleased 1983 Gottlieb pinball machine

- Manufacturer: Gottlieb
- Release date: Never released (planned February, 1983)
- System: 80A
- Design: Adolf Seitz Jr.
- Music: Craig Beierwaltes
- Production run: 10 (engineering prototypes)

Goin' Nuts is a widebody pinball machine that was designed by Adolf Seitz, Jr. for Gottlieb in 1983. The game never went into production and only 10 prototypes were built.

== Description ==
The game is one of the very few machines that it have no outlanes. There are seven pop-bumpers around the single-level playfield, and five banks of three drop targets. The game calls these drop-targets nuts, and calls the balls squirrels. The game starts as 3-ball multiball, launched with an auto-plunger instead of a plunger, and includes a timer which counts down when in single ball play, ended that ball if it reaches 0. The objective is to knock down the sets of drop targets in order to score points and build up time.

Disadvantages of this pinball machine include that a good player may build up too much time.

The only machine publicly available to play is at The Pinball Hall of Fame.

The game was shown at the first Pinball Expo in 1985.

== Digital versions ==
Goin' Nuts was released in 2006 in some versions of the Pinball Hall of Fame: The Gottlieb Collection.

It released in 2013 for The Pinball Arcade for several platforms.
