= Genie (pinball) =

1979 pinball machine

- Manufacturer: Gottlieb
- Release date: October 1979
- System: Gottlieb System 1
- Design: Ed Krynski
- Artwork: Gordon Morison
- Production run: 6,800

Genie is a widebody pinball machine designed by Ed Krynski and released in 1979 by Gottlieb. It features a jinn theme and was advertised with the slogans "Gottlieb's WIDE and Beautiful BODY" and "A Wide-Body Pinball absolutely bulging with player appeal and proven massive profit earning capacity!". This slogan alludes to both the wide body of the game and the body of the genie.

== Design ==
Genie is considered Gottlieb's answer to Bally’s super wide pinball machine Paragon and the start of a competition of a widebody pinball design in the late 1970s. Genie is the first widebody produced by Gottlieb.

The backglass shows a magical genie with a semi-human body released from a lamp, watched by two figures and a small creature. One of these figures and the genie are also shown prominently on the playfield.

The sound system can be adjusted to play an alternative second set of sounds.

== Layout ==
Genie uses 5 flippers. The upper right of the machine has four A-B-C-D lanes above two pop bumpers and a kick-out hole. The upper left of the machine has a mini upper playfield with two of the flippers and seven drop-targets. The middle of the machine includes a bank of four drop-targets and a wide spinner. Further down the left side of the playfield is another set of A-B-C-D lanes above a single pop bumper.

== Gameplay ==
The bonus multiplier is increased using the bank of four drop-targets, and after advancing it sufficiently the player can collect the bonus at the kick-out hole.

The player can earn an extra ball by completing the A-B-C-D lanes and hitting a target in the upper playfield; and can earn another by hitting the correct drop-targets in the upper playfield.

== Reception ==
In a review for Play Meter, Roger Sharpe said the game has a well-designed playfield, awarding the game 4/4.

== Digital versions ==
Genie is included in the Pinball Hall of Fame: The Gottlieb Collection, released by FarSight Studios.

The same developer released the table for The Pinball Arcade for several platforms in 2013.

== See also ==
- Tales of the Arabian Nights (pinball)
