= The Pinball Arcade =

2012 video game

- Developer: FarSight Studios
- Publishers: FarSight Studios; Alliance Digital Media; Crave Entertainment; System 3
- Platforms: Android, iOS, macOS, PlayStation 3, PlayStation Vita, Xbox 360, Microsoft Windows, Kindle Fire, Ouya, PlayStation 4, Xbox One, Wii U, Nintendo Switch
- Release: February 9, 2012: iOS; WW: February 9, 2012 Android; WW: February 10, 2012 Xbox 360; WW: April 4, 2012 (Re-release); WW: May 11, 2015 PlayStation 3, PlayStation Vita; NA: April 10, 2012; EU: July 11, 2012 macOS; WW: April 16, 2012 Kindle Fire; WW: August 16, 2012 Ouya; WW: June 25, 2013 Microsoft Windows; WW: November 4, 2013 PlayStation 4 (Retail); NA: December 10, 2013; EU: February 21, 2014 (PlayStation Network); NA: December 17, 2013; EU: December 18, 2013 Xbox One; WW: November 25, 2014 Wii U; NA: April 21, 2016 Nintendo Switch; WW: April 6, 2018
- Genre: Pinball
- Modes: Single-player, Multiplayer

The Pinball Arcade is a pinball video game developed by FarSight Studios. The game is a simulated collection of 100 real pinball tables licensed by Gottlieb, Alvin G. and Company, and Stern Pinball, a company which also owns the rights of machines from Data East and Sega Pinball. Williams and Bally tables are no longer available since June 30, 2018, as FarSight had lost the license to WMS properties, which has since passed to Zen Studios.

The game is available for download on a number of devices through their respective online stores, including Android (along with derivatives such as Kindle Fire and Ouya), iOS, Windows (through Steam), macOS (through the Mac App Store and Steam), PlayStation Vita, PlayStation 3, PlayStation 4 (through PlayStation Store), Xbox 360, Xbox One, Wii U in North America only, and Nintendo Switch.

Tables are available for free limited demo play on Android, iOS, and other platforms. Every month, along with the release of downloadable content (DLC), four selected tables on mobile versions are free with no Pro Menu features. PC versions are limited to one free table.

Screenshot of the table FunHouse from the PlayStation 4 version

A spin-off called Stern Pinball Arcade was released in June 2016 for Gear VR, PlayStation 4, PC, and other platforms. This is a direct collaboration with Stern Pinball, to expand on re-releasing the company's more recent releases.

== Development ==
The Pinball Arcade is developed by FarSight Studios, who also developed Pinball Hall of Fame: The Gottlieb Collection and Pinball Hall of Fame: The Williams Collection that were published by Crave Entertainment.

After obtaining licenses for a table, a physical table was procured. Numerous photographs were taken for 2D artists to recreate the artwork, then the table was entirely disassembled with scan taken for the 3D artists to recreate the components. ROM emulation is used which includes call-outs, music, and animations from the original tables. Using ROM emulation reduced development time, and improved accuracy of the display.

Four tables were available initially with the game's launch: Black Hole, Ripley's Believe It or Not!, Tales of the Arabian Nights, and Theatre of Magic.

FarSight Studios took part in the Steam Greenlight program to distribute The Pinball Arcade for Windows-based personal computers. The game was successfully Greenlit on April 18, 2013. From August until October 2013, the PC version of The Pinball Arcade was in beta-testing. The Windows version of Pinball Arcade was released on November 4, 2013, along with the first 19 table packs. A Macintosh version of the Steam release was released on December 16, 2013. Although tables have to be purchased for each platform separately FarSight buyers of the Steam version are able to play their tables on OS X and Windows. The first season of the game included 22 tables. By July 2013 the game was using the third revision of pinball physics.

The option to buy a season pass for an entire season, including unreleased tables in advance, was cancelled in February 2014 on the Mac App Store due to violation of Apple's policies that do not allow sales of unreleased software.

On April 1, 2014, FarSight released a patch that included stereoscopic 3D support for PlayStation 3.

Besides recreations of existing pinball machines, FarSight is also produced its own original design table. A Ghostbusters-themed table was released in late October 2014 as a stand-alone application for Android and iOS using the same layout as Haunted House.

DirectX 11 support for the PC version with improved graphics (e.g., dynamic lighting, ambient light settings, and adjustable bulb brightness) was released on July 2, 2015.

The development of a version for the Wii console was considered but scrapped due to technical limitations.

On December 9, 2016, FarSight Studios announced Arcooda Pinball Arcade in cooperation with Arcooda, an Australian manufacturer of arcade and gaming machines. The game is an enhanced version of The Pinball Arcade running in a cabinet.

Al's Garage Band Goes On a World Tour, released on January 27, 2017, was the first table by Alvin G. and Company, the fifth distinct manufacturer to appear in the game.

The WMS license was extended in 2014, and in 2016. Bally and Williams tables are no longer available for purchase following their non-renewal by the rights holders in 2018. The tables may still be played by those who already own them, but they can no longer be purchased as of June 30, 2018. Zen Studios currently holds the rights to develop digital versions of such licensed tables.

=== Platforms ===
==== PlayStation 4 ====
A PlayStation 4 version was unveiled at E3 2013 with the intention of being launch title. Being one of the earliest games to release for the platform, it had a spot on early demo stations. The game was released on a retail disc containing all Season 1 content on December 10, 2013. The game was released on PlayStation Network the following week in North America and in Europe the next day. The retail version was released in Europe on February 21, 2014. In March 2015, a variant of the retail disc was released titled Pinball Arcade: Season 2, containing all Season 2 content and Tales of the Arabian Nights.

==== Xbox 360 ====
Pinball Arcade was released on Xbox 360 via the Xbox Live Marketplace on April 4, 2012, but was discontinued in July 2013 due to the bankruptcy of publisher Crave Entertainment, combined with Microsoft's then strict publishing guidelines on Xbox Live. The bankruptcy led FarSight Studios to only add the game's first 10 tables until the discontinuation. FarSight hoped for some legal resolution and hoped to add more content.

After releasing the game on PS4, Alliance Digital Media became the studios' next publisher. On April 11, 2014, they confirmed that all other released content up to that point was submitted to Microsoft for approval and release. In May 2015, the game returned to the marketplace adding Table Packs 4 to 35, and a user interface revision.

==== Xbox One ====
Although FarSight Studios expressed interest in working on Xbox One, they did not commit to developing the game until 2014. It was formally announced at GDC 2014 along the "ID@Xbox" Program, following Microsoft's relaxation on publishing policies before the Xbox One's launch. The game, plus its first three seasons of content, was released on November 24, 2014.

==== Wii U ====
Despite being released on April 21, 2016, the game was intended for release within the system's launch window. When it was unveiled to the public, the game used the Wii U GamePad to display the HUD on its screen. This version was fraught with delays, pushing the game back to dates which included December 2012 and September 2013. The game was finally released in early 2016 release, though it lacked any additional features such as the aforementioned HUD option.

==== Nintendo Switch ====
The Nintendo Switch version was announced on December 23, 2017, to popular demand. While the game was released as intended on April 6, 2018, it was removed from the North American Nintendo eShop that same day due to issues regarding at least one license. It was reintroduced to the Nintendo eShop on May 11, 2018, lacking all Williams/Bally content and included only 36 tables in DLC packs.

This version of the game includes various features that were implemented into Stern Pinball Arcade via updates; including leaderboards, touch screen controls, and a "TATE" (portrait) screen mode.

== Tables ==
Tables were previously available in season packs and pro packs allowing players to buy all tables of a season at once. Since the loss of the Bally/Williams license, tables are available in manufacturer packs with other manufacturers, such as Gottlieb/Premier, being split into multiple packs. Although tables are not necessarily released to all platforms and/or regions simultaneously, there are currently 101 published tables. (including The Addams Family: Gold Edition and Williams/Bally games.)

=== Pro Menus ===
In late October 2012, FarSight began to release "Pro Menu" upgrades for previously released tables. The upgrade lets the player control the camera to look around the table, control the ball, learn tips from pro players, and view the coin door and use the operator's menu. For Scared Stiff, it also grants the ability to turn off family mode with an uncensored voice-over. Pro Menus are not available on all tables due to the lack of features that didn't exist on the actual tables.

=== Exclusive tables ===
The Addams Family Special Collector's Gold Edition (The Addams Family table with gold accents as well as software and game play enhancements) was available through "Gold Mode" exclusively to Kickstarter backers who donated over $100.

=== Bally/Williams ===
On May 7, 2018, the company confirmed it had lost its longstanding licenses for tables reproduced from Bally and Williams. It was announced that they would no longer be offered for sale after June 30, but they were actually still available through at least July 6, 2018. Customers who purchased any of these tables prior to the deadline will still be able to play them, and FarSight will continue to support them.

=== Kickstarter ===
FarSight Studios launched a Kickstarter project in order to cover the cost to acquire the necessary licenses to publish Bally/Midway's Twilight Zone table. FarSight Studios pledged to also digitize Williams' Star Trek: The Next Generation table if the Twilight Zone project reached double its $55,000 goal ($110,000). Funding of the Twilight Zone was successful. A total of $77,499 was raised to fund licensing for Twilight Zone. FarSight Studios President Jay Obernolte signed the license agreement for Twilight Zone on June 8, 2012. Surplus funds, after deductions from unfulfilled pledges and processing fees, were applied to a new Kickstarter project for Star Trek: The Next Generation that was launched August 17, 2012. This project was also successfully funded.

On June 21, 2013, FarSight Studios issued a Kickstarter to digitize Terminator 2: Judgment Day. It successfully surpassed the $59,000 goal with $62,360 raised. A similar Kickstarter campaign was utilized to digitize The Addams Family for release in February 2015. The $97,640 goal was reached on October 7, 2014, with $17,636 in excess funds being designated towards acquiring their next big-license table.

On December 25, 2015, FarSight Studios announced on Facebook that the next Kickstarter would be for Bally's Doctor Who. The goal of $54,364 was reached on February 13, 2016, with $16,566 in excess.

FarSight's most recent Kickstarter project launched on May 2, 2016, with plans to digitize Stern's AC/DC pinball table for Stern Pinball Arcade; the announced funding goal was $108,435. Due to a new partnership as a response of the positive reception, this Kickstarter was canceled as the intended funding was no longer necessary. However, as of July 1, 2019, the license has expired and the table is no longer available for purchase.

=== Legal alterations ===
For some legal and licensing reasons, certain tables had to be modified. Some examples include alterations to key table art assets, removal of certain code, and omissions of some music. This also went as far as radical redesigning. Some examples include the removal of Christopher Lloyd's likeness in The Addams Family, the omission of SEGA and Data East logos and references on 1990s Stern tables, and the conversion of World Cup Soccer to World Champion Soccer and the removal of all references to the World Cup USA 94 brand.

=== Table key ===
✓	Table has been published for this platform, or has been altered.
✗	Table has not been published for this platform, or has not been altered.
^{P}	Pro Menu upgrade has been published for this platform.
^{E}	Table is available on this platform exclusively via special distribution (Kickstarter awards, etc.)
†	Table is no longer available for purchase due to non-renewed license, but is still playable for those who bought the tables before being delisted.

=== Published ===
Table	Table Type	Manufacturer	Year	Altered	iOS	AND	WIN/ mOS STM	PS3/ Vita PSN	mOS MAS	PS4	X360 XBLA	XONE	Wii U	NS
Tales of the Arabian Nights^{†}	Solid state (Dot-matrix)	Williams	1996-05	✗	✓ ^{P}	✓ ^{P}	✓ ^{P}	✓ ^{P}	✓ ^{P}	✓ ^{P}	✓ ^{P}	✓ ^{P}	✓ ^{P}	✓
Black Hole	Solid state (Numeric)	Gottlieb	1981-10	✗	✓	✓	✓	✓	✓	✓	✓	✓	✓	✓
Ripley's Believe It or Not!	Solid state (Dot-matrix)	Stern	2004-03-18	✗	✓	✓	✓	✓	✓	✓	✓	✓	✓	✓
Theatre of Magic^{†}	Solid state (Dot-matrix)	Bally	1995-03-28	✗	✓	✓	✓	✓	✓	✓	✓	✓	✓	✓
The Machine: Bride of Pin•Bot^{†}	Solid state (Alphanumeric)	Williams	1991-02	✗	✓	✓	✓	✓	✓	✓	✓	✓	✓	✓
Medieval Madness^{†}	Solid state (Dot-matrix)	Williams	1997-06	✗	✓ ^{P}	✓ ^{P}	✓ ^{P}	✓ ^{P}	✓ ^{P}	✓ ^{P}	✓ ^{P}	✓ ^{P}	✓ ^{P}	✓
Cirqus Voltaire^{†}	Solid state (Dot-matrix)	Bally	1997-10	✗	✓	✓	✓	✓	✓	✓	✓	✓	✓	✓
FunHouse^{†}	Solid state (Alphanumeric)	Williams	1990-11-08	✗	✓	✓	✓	✓	✓	✓	✓	✓	✓	✓
Gorgar^{†}	Solid state (Numeric)	Williams	1979-12	✗	✓	✓	✓	✓	✓	✓	✓	✓	✓	✓
Monster Bash^{†}	Solid state (Dot-matrix)	Williams	1998-07	✗	✓	✓	✓	✓	✓	✓	✓	✓	✓	✓
Black Knight^{†}	Solid state (Numeric)	Williams	1980-11	✗	✓	✓	✓	✓	✓	✓ ^{P}	✓	✓	✓	✓
Creature from the Black Lagoon^{†}	Solid state (Dot-matrix)	Bally	1992-12	✓	✓	✓	✓	✓	✓	✓ ^{P}	✓	✓	✓	✓
Harley-Davidson, 3rd Edition	Solid state (Dot-matrix)	Stern (originally Sega Pinball)	2004 (1999)	✗	✓	✓	✓	✓	✓	✓	✓	✓	✓	✓
Taxi^{†}	Solid state (Alphanumeric)	Williams	1988-08-31	✗	✓	✓	✓	✓	✓	✓	✓	✓	✓	✓
Elvira and the Party Monsters^{†}	Solid state (Alphanumeric)	Bally	1989-09-05	✗	✓	✓	✓	✓	✓	✓	✓	✓	✓	✓
No Good Gofers^{†}	Solid state (Dot-matrix)	Williams	1997-12	✗	✓	✓	✓	✓	✓	✓	✓	✓	✓	✓
Scared Stiff^{†}	Solid state (Dot-matrix)	Bally	1996-09	✗	✓ ^{P}	✓ ^{P}	✓ ^{P}	✓ ^{P}	✓ ^{P}	✓ ^{P}	✓ ^{P}	✓ ^{P}	✓ ^{P}	✓
Big Shot	Electro-mechanical	Gottlieb	1974-01	✗	✓	✓	✓	✓	✓	✓	✓	✓	✓	✓
Twilight Zone^{†}	Solid state (Dot-matrix)	Bally	1993-04-05	✗	✓ ^{P}	✓ ^{P}	✓ ^{P}	✓ ^{P}	✓ ^{P}	✓ ^{P}	✓ ^{P}	✓ ^{P}	✓ ^{P}	✓
Star Trek: The Next Generation^{†}	Solid state (Dot-matrix)	Williams	1993-11	✗	✓ ^{P}	✓ ^{P}	✓ ^{P}	✓ ^{P}	✓ ^{P}	✓ ^{P}	✓ ^{P}	✓ ^{P}	✓ ^{P}	✓
Attack from Mars^{†}	Solid state (Dot-matrix)	Bally	1995-12	✗	✓ ^{P}	✓ ^{P}	✓ ^{P}	✓ ^{P}	✓ ^{P}	✓ ^{P}	✓ ^{P}	✓ ^{P}	✓ ^{P}	✓
Genie	Solid state (Numeric)	Gottlieb	1979-11	✗	✓	✓	✓	✓	✓	✓	✓	✓	✓	✓
Dr. Dude and His Excellent Ray^{†}	Solid state (Alphanumeric)	Bally	1990-11	✗	✓ ^{P}	✓ ^{P}	✓ ^{P}	✓ ^{P}	✓ ^{P}	✓ ^{P}	✓ ^{P}	✓ ^{P}	✓ ^{P}	✓
Firepower^{†}	Solid state (Numeric)	Williams	1980-02	✗	✓	✓	✓	✓	✓	✓	✓	✓	✓	✓
Cactus Canyon^{†}	Solid state (Dot-matrix)	Bally	1998-10	✗	✓ ^{P}	✓ ^{P}	✓ ^{P}	✓ ^{P}	✓ ^{P}	✓ ^{P}	✓ ^{P}	✓ ^{P}	✓ ^{P}	✓
Central Park	Electro-mechanical	Gottlieb	1966-04	✗	✓	✓	✓	✓	✓	✓	✓	✓	✓	✓
Space Shuttle^{†}	Solid state (Numeric)	Williams	1984-12	✗	✓	✓	✓	✓	✓	✓	✓	✓	✓	✓
White Water^{†}	Solid state (Dot-matrix)	Williams	1993-01	✗	✓ ^{P}	✓ ^{P}	✓ ^{P}	✓ ^{P}	✓ ^{P}	✓ ^{P}	✓ ^{P}	✓ ^{P}	✓ ^{P}	✓
Centaur^{†}	Solid state (Numeric)	Bally	1981-10	✗	✓	✓	✓	✓	✓	✓	✓	✓	✓	✓
PIN•BOT^{†}	Solid state (Alphanumeric)	Williams	1986-10	✗	✓ ^{P}	✓ ^{P}	✓ ^{P}	✓ ^{P}	✓ ^{P}	✓ ^{P}	✓ ^{P}	✓ ^{P}	✓ ^{P}	✓
The Champion Pub^{†}	Solid state (Dot-matrix)	Bally	1998-04	✗	✓ ^{P}	✓ ^{P}	✓ ^{P}	✓ ^{P}	✓ ^{P}	✓ ^{P}	✓ ^{P}	✓ ^{P}	✓ ^{P}	✓
Whirlwind^{†}	Solid state (Alphanumeric)	Williams	1990-01	✗	✓ ^{P}	✓ ^{P}	✓ ^{P}	✓ ^{P}	✓ ^{P}	✓ ^{P}	✓ ^{P}	✓ ^{P}	✓ ^{P}	✓
Flight 2000	Solid state (Numeric)	Stern	1980-10	✗	✓ ^{P}	✓ ^{P}	✓ ^{P}	✓ ^{P}	✓ ^{P}	✓ ^{P}	✓ ^{P}	✓ ^{P}	✓ ^{P}	✓
Goin' Nuts	Solid state (Numeric)	Gottlieb	1983-02	✗	✓ ^{P}	✓ ^{P}	✓ ^{P}	✓ ^{P}	✓ ^{P}	✓ ^{P}	✓ ^{P}	✓ ^{P}	✓ ^{P}	✓
Terminator 2: Judgment Day^{†}	Solid state (Dot-matrix)	Williams	1991-07	✗	✓ ^{P}	✓ ^{P}	✓ ^{P}	✓ ^{P}	✓ ^{P}	✓ ^{P}	✓ ^{P}	✓ ^{P}	✓ ^{P}	✓
Tee'd Off	Solid state (Dot-matrix)	Gottlieb	1993-05	✗	✓ ^{P}	✓ ^{P}	✓ ^{P}	✓ ^{P}	✓ ^{P}	✓ ^{P}	✓ ^{P}	✓ ^{P}	✓ ^{P}	✓
Haunted House	Solid state (Numeric)	Gottlieb	1982-06	✗	✓	✓	✓	✓	✓	✓	✓	✓	✓	✓
Victory	Solid state (Alphanumeric)	Gottlieb	1987-10	✗	✓	✓	✓	✓	✓	✓	✓	✓	✓	✓
Class of 1812	Solid state (Alphanumeric)	Gottlieb	1991-08	✗	✓ ^{P}	✓ ^{P}	✓ ^{P}	✓ ^{P}	✓ ^{P}	✓ ^{P}	✓ ^{P}	✓ ^{P}	✓ ^{P}	✓
Cue Ball Wizard	Solid state (Dot-matrix)	Gottlieb	1992-10	✗	✓ ^{P}	✓ ^{P}	✓ ^{P}	✓ ^{P}	✓ ^{P}	✓ ^{P}	✓ ^{P}	✓ ^{P}	✓ ^{P}	✓
El Dorado: City Of Gold	Solid state (Numeric)	Gottlieb	1984-09	✗	✓	✓	✓	✓	✓	✓	✓	✓	✓	✓
Fish Tales^{†}	Solid state (Dot-matrix)	Williams	1992-10	✗	✓ ^{P}	✓ ^{P}	✓ ^{P}	✓ ^{P}	✓ ^{P}	✓ ^{P}	✓ ^{P}	✓ ^{P}	✓ ^{P}	✓
Black Rose^{†}	Solid state (Dot-matrix)	Bally	1992-07	✗	✓ ^{P}	✓ ^{P}	✓ ^{P}	✓ ^{P}	✓ ^{P}	✓ ^{P}	✓ ^{P}	✓ ^{P}	✓ ^{P}	✓
Black Knight 2000^{†}	Solid state (Alphanumeric)	Williams	1989-04-04	✗	✓ ^{P}	✓ ^{P}	✓ ^{P}	✓ ^{P}	✓ ^{P}	✓ ^{P}	✓ ^{P}	✓ ^{P}	✓ ^{P}	✓
WHO Dunnit^{†}	Solid state (Dot-matrix)	Bally	1995-09	✗	✓ ^{P}	✓ ^{P}	✓ ^{P}	✓ ^{P}	✓ ^{P}	✓ ^{P}	✓ ^{P}	✓ ^{P}	✓ ^{P}	✓
High Speed^{†}	Solid state (Alphanumeric)	Williams	1986-01	✗	✓ ^{P}	✓ ^{P}	✓ ^{P}	✓ ^{P}	✓ ^{P}	✓ ^{P}	✓ ^{P}	✓ ^{P}	✓ ^{P}	✓
Junk Yard^{†}	Solid state (Dot-matrix)	Williams	1996-12	✗	✓ ^{P}	✓ ^{P}	✓ ^{P}	✓ ^{P}	✓ ^{P}	✓ ^{P}	✓ ^{P}	✓ ^{P}	✓ ^{P}	✓
Lights...Camera...Action!	Solid state (Alphanumeric)	Gottlieb	1989-12	✗	✓ ^{P}	✓ ^{P}	✓ ^{P}	✓ ^{P}	✓ ^{P}	✓ ^{P}	✓ ^{P}	✓ ^{P}	✓ ^{P}	✓
High Roller Casino	Solid state (Dot-matrix)	Stern	2001-01	✗	✓ ^{P}	✓ ^{P}	✓ ^{P}	✓ ^{P}	✓ ^{P}	✓ ^{P}	✓ ^{P}	✓ ^{P}	✓ ^{P}	✓
Diner^{†}	Solid state (Alphanumeric)	Williams	1990-09	✗	✓ ^{P}	✓ ^{P}	✓ ^{P}	✓ ^{P}	✓ ^{P}	✓ ^{P}	✓ ^{P}	✓ ^{P}	✓ ^{P}	✓
Bram Stoker's Dracula^{†}	Solid state (Dot-matrix)	Williams	1993-04	✗	✓ ^{P}	✓ ^{P}	✓ ^{P}	✓ ^{P}	✓ ^{P}	✓ ^{P}	✓ ^{P}	✓ ^{P}	✓ ^{P}	✓
Phantom of the Opera	Solid state (Alphanumeric)	Data East	1990-01	✓	✓ ^{P}	✓ ^{P}	✓ ^{P}	✓ ^{P}	✓ ^{P}	✓ ^{P}	✓ ^{P}	✓ ^{P}	✓ ^{P}	✓
The Party Zone^{†}	Solid state (Dot-matrix)	Bally	1991-08	✓	✓ ^{P}	✓ ^{P}	✓ ^{P}	✓ ^{P}	✓ ^{P}	✓ ^{P}	✓ ^{P}	✓ ^{P}	✓ ^{P}	✓
Earthshaker!^{†}	Solid state (Alphanumeric)	Williams	1989-02-21	✗	✓ ^{P}	✓ ^{P}	✓ ^{P}	✓ ^{P}	✓ ^{P}	✓ ^{P}	✓ ^{P}	✓ ^{P}	✓ ^{P}	✓
Starship Troopers	Solid state (Dot-matrix)	Sega Pinball	1997-12	✓	✓ ^{P}	✓ ^{P}	✓ ^{P}	✓ ^{P}	✓ ^{P}	✓ ^{P}	✓ ^{P}	✓ ^{P}	✓ ^{P}	✓
The Addams Family^{†}	Solid state (Dot-matrix)	Bally	1992-03	✓	✓ ^{P}	✓ ^{P}	✓ ^{P}	✓ ^{P}	✓ ^{P}	✓ ^{P}	✓ ^{P}	✓ ^{P}	✓ ^{P}	✓
The Addams Family Gold^{†}	Solid state (Dot-matrix)	Bally	1994-10	✓	✓ ^{E}	✓ ^{E}	✓ ^{E}	✗	✓ ^{E}	✓ ^{E}	✗	✓ ^{E}	✓ ^{E}	✗
Cyclone^{†}	Solid state (Alphanumeric)	Williams	1988-02	✗	✓ ^{P}	✓ ^{P}	✓ ^{P}	✓ ^{P}	✓ ^{P}	✓ ^{P}	✗	✓ ^{P}	✓ ^{P}	✓
Jack•Bot^{†}	Solid state (Dot-matrix)	Williams	1995-10-10	✗	✓ ^{P}	✓ ^{P}	✓ ^{P}	✓ ^{P}	✓ ^{P}	✓ ^{P}	✗	✓ ^{P}	✓ ^{P}	✓
Xenon^{†}	Solid state (Numeric)	Bally	1980-11	✗	✓ ^{P}	✓ ^{P}	✓ ^{P}	✓ ^{P}	✓ ^{P}	✓ ^{P}	✗	✓ ^{P}	✓ ^{P}	✓
Red & Ted's Road Show^{†}	Solid state (Dot-matrix)	Williams	1994-10	✗	✓ ^{P}	✓ ^{P}	✓ ^{P}	✓ ^{P}	✓ ^{P}	✓ ^{P}	✗	✓ ^{P}	✓ ^{P}	✓
Safe Cracker^{†}	Solid state (Dot-matrix)	Bally	1996-03	✗	✓ ^{P}	✓ ^{P}	✓ ^{P}	✓ ^{P}	✓ ^{P}	✓ ^{P}	✗	✓ ^{P}	✓ ^{P}	✓
The Getaway: High Speed II^{†}	Solid state (Dot-matrix)	Williams	1992-02	✗	✓	✓	✓ ^{P}	✓ ^{P}	✓	✓ ^{P}	✗	✓	✓	✓
F-14 Tomcat^{†}	Solid state (Alphanumeric)	Williams	1987-03	✗	✓	✓	✓ ^{P}	✓ ^{P}	✓	✓ ^{P}	✗	✓	✓	✓
Mary Shelley's Frankenstein	Solid state (Dot-matrix)	Sega Pinball	1995-01	✓	✓	✓	✓ ^{P}	✓ ^{P}	✓	✓ ^{P}	✗	✓	✓	✓
No Fear: Dangerous Sports^{†}	Solid state (Dot-matrix)	Williams	1995-05	✓	✓	✓	✓ ^{P}	✓ ^{P}	✓	✓ ^{P}	✗	✓	✓	✓
Judge Dredd^{†}	Solid state (Dot-matrix)	Bally	1993-09	✗	✓	✓	✓ ^{P}	✓ ^{P}	✓	✓ ^{P}	✗	✓	✓	✓
Fireball^{†}	Electro-mechanical	Bally	1972-02	✗	✓	✓	✓ ^{P}	✓ ^{P}	✓	✓ ^{P}	✗	✓	✗	✓
El Dorado	Electro-mechanical	Gottlieb	1975-04	✗	✓	✓	✓ ^{P}	✓ ^{P}	✓	✓ ^{P}	✗	✓	✗	✓
Hurricane^{†}	Solid state (Dot-matrix)	Williams	1991-08	✗	✓	✓	✓ ^{P}	✓ ^{P}	✓	✓ ^{P}	✗	✓	✗	✓
Rescue 911	Solid state (Dot-matrix)	Gottlieb	1994-05	✗	✓	✓	✓ ^{P}	✓ ^{P}	✓	✓ ^{P}	✗	✓	✗	✓
Last Action Hero	Solid state (Dot-matrix)	Data East	1993-06	✓	✓	✓	✓ ^{P}	✓ ^{P}	✓	✓ ^{P}	✗	✓	✗	✓
TX-Sector	Solid state (Alphanumeric)	Gottlieb	1988-03	✗	✓	✓	✓ ^{P}	✓ ^{P}	✗	✓ ^{P}	✗	✓	✗	✓
Indianapolis 500^{†}	Solid state (Dot-matrix)	Bally	1995-06-06	✓	✓	✓	✓ ^{P}	✓ ^{P}	✓	✓ ^{P}	✗	✓	✗	✓
Frank Thomas' Big Hurt	Solid state (Dot-matrix)	Gottlieb	1995-06	✓	✓	✓	✓ ^{P}	✓ ^{P}	✓	✓ ^{P}	✗	✓	✗	✓
Eight Ball Deluxe^{†}	Solid state (Numeric)	Bally	1981-04	✗	✓	✓	✓ ^{P}	✓ ^{P}	✓	✓ ^{P}	✗	✓	✗	✓
Doctor Who^{†}	Solid state (Dot-matrix)	Bally	1992-09	✗	✓	✓	✓ ^{P}	✓ ^{P}	✓	✓ ^{P}	✗	✓	✗	✓
Bone Busters Inc.	Solid state (Alphanumeric)	Gottlieb	1989-08	✗	✓	✓	✓ ^{P}	✓ ^{P}	✓	✓ ^{P}	✗	✓	✗	✓
Jacks Open	Electro-mechanical	Gottlieb	1977-01	✗	✓	✓	✓ ^{P}	✓ ^{P}	✓	✓ ^{P}	✗	✓	✗	✓
Centigrade 37	Electro-mechanical	Gottlieb	1977-08	✗	✓	✓	✓ ^{P}	✓ ^{P}	✓	✓ ^{P}	✗	✓	✗	✓
Doctor Who: Master of Time	Solid state (Dot-matrix)	FarSight Studios (originally Bally)	2016	✗	✓	✓	✓	✓	✓	✓	✗	✓	✗	✓
Gladiators	Solid state (Dot-matrix)	Gottlieb	1993-11	✗	✓	✓	✓ ^{P}	✓ ^{P}	✓	✓ ^{P}	✗	✓	✗	✓
Al's Garage Band Goes On a World Tour	Solid state (Dot-matrix)	Alvin G. and Co.	1992-12	✗	✓	✓	✓ ^{P}	✓ ^{P}	✗	✓ ^{P}	✗	✓	✗	✓
Cactus Jack's	Solid state (Alphanumeric)	Gottlieb	1991-04	✗	✓	✓	✓ ^{P}	✓ ^{P}	✗	✓ ^{P}	✗	✓	✗	✓
Swords of Fury^{†}	Solid state (Alphanumeric)	Williams	1988-06-24	✗	✓	✓	✓ ^{P}	✓ ^{P}	✗	✓ ^{P}	✗	✓	✗	✓
Paragon^{†}	Solid state (Numeric)	Bally	1978-12-05	✗	✓	✓	✓ ^{P}	✗	✗	✓	✗	✓	✗	✓
Wipe Out	Solid state (Dot-matrix)	Gottlieb	1993-10	✗	✓	✓	✓	✗	✗	✓	✗	✓	✗	✓
Firepower II^{†}	Solid state (Numeric)	Williams	1983-08	✗	✓	✓	✓	✗	✗	✓	✗	✓	✗	✓
World Champion Soccer^{†}	Solid state (Dot-matrix)	Bally	1994-02	✓	✓	✓	✓	✗	✗	✓	✗	✓	✗	✓
Fathom^{†}	Solid state (Numeric)	Bally	1981-08	✗	✓	✓	✓	✗	✗	✓	✗	✓	✗	✓
Ghostbusters	Solid state (Dot-matrix)	Stern	2016-05	✗	✓	✓	✓	✗	✗	✓	✗	✓	✗	✓
Spanish Eyes^{†}	Electro-mechanical	Williams	1972-01-12	✗	✓	✓	✓	✗	✗	✓	✗	✓	✗	✓
Wild Card^{†}	Electro-mechanical	Williams	1977-06-01	✗	✓	✓	✓	✗	✗	✓	✗	✓	✗	✓
Pistol Poker	Solid state (Dot-matrix)	Alvin G. and Co.	1993-11	✗	✓	✓	✓	✗	✗	✓	✗	✓	✗	✓
Sorcerer^{†}	Solid state (Numeric)	Williams	1985-03	✗	✓	✓	✓	✗	✗	✓	✗	✓	✗	✓
Banzai Run^{†}	Solid state (Alphanumeric)	Williams	1988-05-20	✗	✓	✓	✓	✗	✗	✓	✗	✓	✗	✓
AC/DC ^{†}	Solid state (Dot-matrix)	Stern	2012-03	✗	✓	✓	✓	✗	✗	✓	✗	✓	✗	✓
Star Trek	Solid state (Dot-matrix)	Stern	2013	✗	✓	✓	✓	✗	✗	✓	✗	✓	✗	✓
Mustang	Solid state (Dot-matrix)	Stern	2014-05	✗	✓	✓	✓	✗	✗	✓	✗	✓	✗	✓
Big Buck Hunter Pro	Solid state (Dot-matrix)	Stern	2010-01	✗	✓	✓	✓	✗	✗	✓	✗	✓	✗	✗
Whoa Nellie! Big Juicy Melons	Solid state/Electro-mechanical^{a}	Stern	2015-03	✗	✓	✓	✓	✗	✗	✓	✗	✓	✗	✗

^a Although this table uses solid state electronics, it features an EM-style score reel.

== Reception ==
Reception

Review scores
Publication	Score
IGN	9/10 (PC & PS4)
PCMag	3.5/5 (PC)

The Pinball Arcade was well received by critics. It averages 84.83% for Xbox 360, 81.67% for PS3, and 80.00% for PlayStation

Vita at GameRankings and 82/100 for Xbox 360, 79/100 for PlayStation Vita, and 82/100 for iOS at Metacritic. IGN praised the PC and PS4 versions of The Pinball Arcade and concluded: "For pinball fanatics or just those curious about gaming’s relatively low-tech past, Pinball Arcade is an excellent starting point for re-experiencing the golden days of quarter-munchers." Reviewing the game in 2016, PCMag found the game expensive, but tolerable for pinball fans. The recreations of tables and ball physics were praised. The menu interface was criticized, and anti-aliasing was found to be insufficient in some close-up views.

The Pinball Arcade won best mobile game of 2012 in X-Play's Best of 2012 Awards and was also nominated for best remake/retro release in 2012. The PC World website listed The Pinball Arcade at number 100 on their top 100 best products of 2012.

For licensing work on The Pinball Arcade, vice president of product development Bobby King, and CEO Jay Obernolte were named in 2012 on Game Developer Magazine's "Power 50" list.

It was downloaded over 1,000,000 times in the first month, and over 7,000,000 times by 2013.

A BBC News article described virtual pinball games such as The Pinball Arcade as a way to preserve pinball culture and bring it to new audiences.

In 2016, Den of Geek ranked The Pinball Arcade version of Star Trek: The Next Generation as one of the top four Star Trek games.

== See also ==
- Microsoft Pinball Arcade
