= El Dorado City of Gold (pinball) =

1984 pinball machine

- Manufacturer: Gottlieb
- Release date: September, 1984
- System: System 80A
- Design: Ed Krynski
- Artwork: Larry Day
- Production run: 905 (El Dorado City of Gold); 2,875 (El Dorado); 675 (Gold Strike); 1,013 (Lucky Strike); 7,285 (Target Alpha); 2,885 (Canada Dry); 2,525 (Solar City)

El Dorado City of Gold is a pinball machine designed by Ed Krynski and released in 1984 by Gottlieb. The game features an El Dorado adventure theme.

Different versions of this game with different names were released: its predecessor the pinball machine is based on, El Dorado (1975) – a one player replay version, Gold Strike – an Add-a-ball version, Lucky Strike an Add-A-Ball version for Italy, Target Alpha – a four player replay version, Canada Dry – a four player replay game made only for France, and Solar City – a two player replay version.

== Design ==
It is the last game designed by Ed Krynski. Two explorers are depicted on the backglass that were portrayed by two Gottlieb video game artist, Jeri Knighton and Jeff Lee.

=== Original version (1975) ===
The original version El Dorado from 1975 depicts a western theme on the backglass.

=== Layout ===
All these games share the same layout. There are ten drop-targets at the top of the machine, and five on the right. The game is controlled with four flippers, and includes a pop bumper near the top right of the playfield, and another towards the left side.

== Gameplay ==
By knocking down all the top targets twice the player can earn an extra ball. The other group of five drop-targets advances the bonus multiplier.

The 1975 versions have variations in scoring which affects gameplay.

== Digital versions ==
Some versions of Pinball Hall of Fame: The Gottlieb Collection include the 1984 version of El Dorado City of Gold The same developer released it for The Pinball Arcade.

The original 1975 version of El Dorado also released for The Pinball Arcade.
