= Slick Chick (pinball) =

1963 pinball machine

- Manufacturer: D. Gottlieb & Co.
- Release date: April 1963
- Design: Wayne Neyens
- Artwork: Roy Parker
- Production run: 4,550

Slick Chick is a single player wedge head pinball machine designed by Wayne Neyens and released by Gottlieb in April 1963.

== Design and layout ==
The game designer, Wayne Neyens, conceived of the name "Party Girls" after designing a layout including nine criss-crossing bumpers. Others thought the name was too risque so Neyens looked for two other five letter words with a common middle letter; he took inspiration from a Chicago restaurant and called it Slick Chick. The five central bumpers are pop bumpers, with the four outer ones "simple bumpers". The playfield is symmetrical.

The game uses a deeper cabinet than prior Gottlieb machines, and has a large chrome coin door. An "auto-clamp" feature was introduced to lock the playfield in position using a spring-loaded lever. The backglass and playfield include bunny girls.

== Gameplay ==
The main objective of the game is to spell S-L-I-C-K C-H-I-C-K by hitting the bumpers in order, or by hitting various other targets around the playfield. Each time the name is completed a rollover target is lit, and after all five are lit the player is awarded a replay if they lose the ball in the gobble hole in the middle of the table. A replay can also be awarded if four rollovers at the sides of the table are completed in order.

== Reception ==
In Bueschel's Encyclopedia of Pinball it was ranked the 77th best pinball machine by a group of pinball historians, regarding it as "one of the finest skill games ever made".

== Digital version ==
Slick Chick is one of seven Gottlieb tables recreated and released in Microsoft Pinball Arcade in 1998.
