= Five Star Final (pinball) =

1932 pinball machine

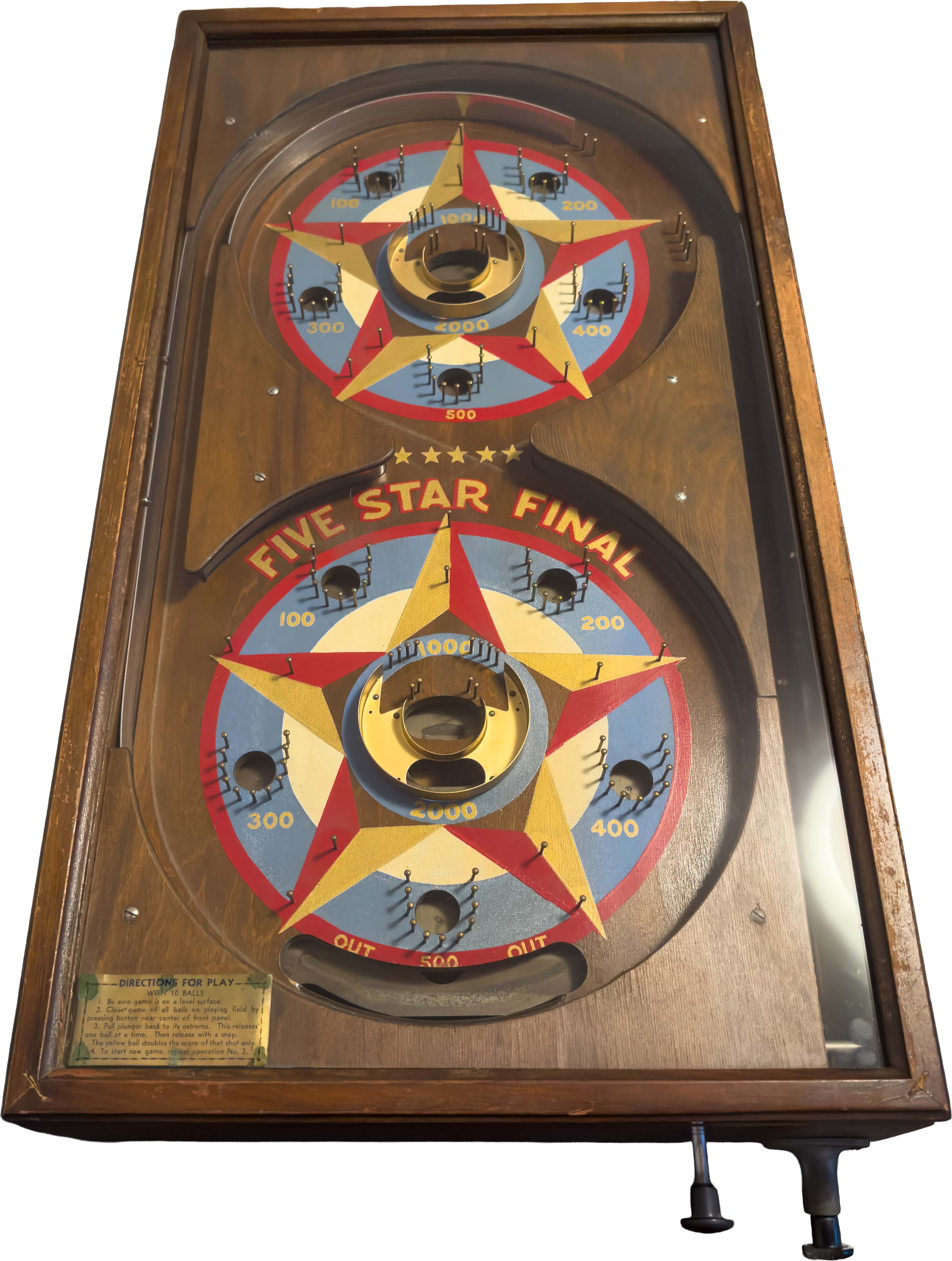
- Manufacturer: D. Gottlieb & Co.
- Release date: June 1 1932
- Players: 1
- Design: David Gottlieb
- Mechanics: Purely Mechanical
- Production run: > 50,000

Five Star Final is a pinball machine produced in 1932 by D. Gottlieb & Co amusement company. Designed by David Gottlieb, it is one of the early coin-operated pinball machines released during the Great Depression following the success of Gottlieb's Baffle Ball in 1931. Named after the practice of newspapers publishing a series of editions throughout the day, with their final-edition front page having five stars printed and the word "Final." This name, along with the advertising in newspapers and magazines, led some to believe this to be Gottlieb's final game. Five Star Final is notable for its innovative double playfield design and its role in the early pinball era.

== History ==
Five Star Final shares many game elements found in any pinball machine; various obstacles (pins, posts, walls), different scoring hole values, clear glass covering the playfield, limited number of balls (10) and a special yellow/gold ball that doubles whichever hole it lands in. There are no bumpers or automatic scoring as this game predates electricity being added to pinball machines.

Five Star Final was the first double playfield, figure eight design. The playfield design, before the game was even delivered, was copied everywhere. New games, and replacement playfields, all copied its inventive ball movement. The first advertisement in The Billboard on June 4^{th} said Five Star Final was "The Game of Swift Dynamic Action!" By June 18^{th} the head had changed to "Original Idea! Swift Action! Cheat Proof Slot! New Ball Lift! Sensitive Plunger!" and by June 25^{th} copy had been added to say, "Buy The Original. 'They copied all they could follow, but they couldn't copy my mind, and I left them sweatin' and stealin', a year and a half behind.' Brains Originate. Parrots Imitate." By November 1933 it was still reported to be earning well, despite competition from newer games.

When this game released Dave Gottlieb said "The evolution of the pin game will be the theme song of my firm".

Five Star Final followed the successful model of the earlier Baffle Ball in that there were two models released simultaneously. Five Star Final Jr. and Five Star Final Sr. released at $16.50 and $37.50 respectively and the two models share many similar features with Five Star Final Sr. being longer and including level adjusting legs. Operators buying the game could earn back their investment in a week.

Five Star Final launched Gottlieb's export business to England, France and Germany. D. Gottlieb & Co. international jobbers and exports became an important phase in their successful business development.

Sales surpassed those of Baffle Ball; production continued into 1933 and the machine was shown by Gottlieb at the 1933 Chicago coin machine show alongside newer machines.

A successor machine from Gottlieb called Broker's Tip released exactly a year later, incorporated the figure eight from this machine into its design.

== In popular culture ==
The first advertisements for Five Star Final started in May of 1932 with a series of small advertisements showing a "five star final" edition of a newspaper with the words "Five Star Final" in large bold letters on the front cover and "Coming June 1st". The following advertisements were swift and many as evidenced by full color direct mailers and full double page spreads advertising the game in The Billboard.

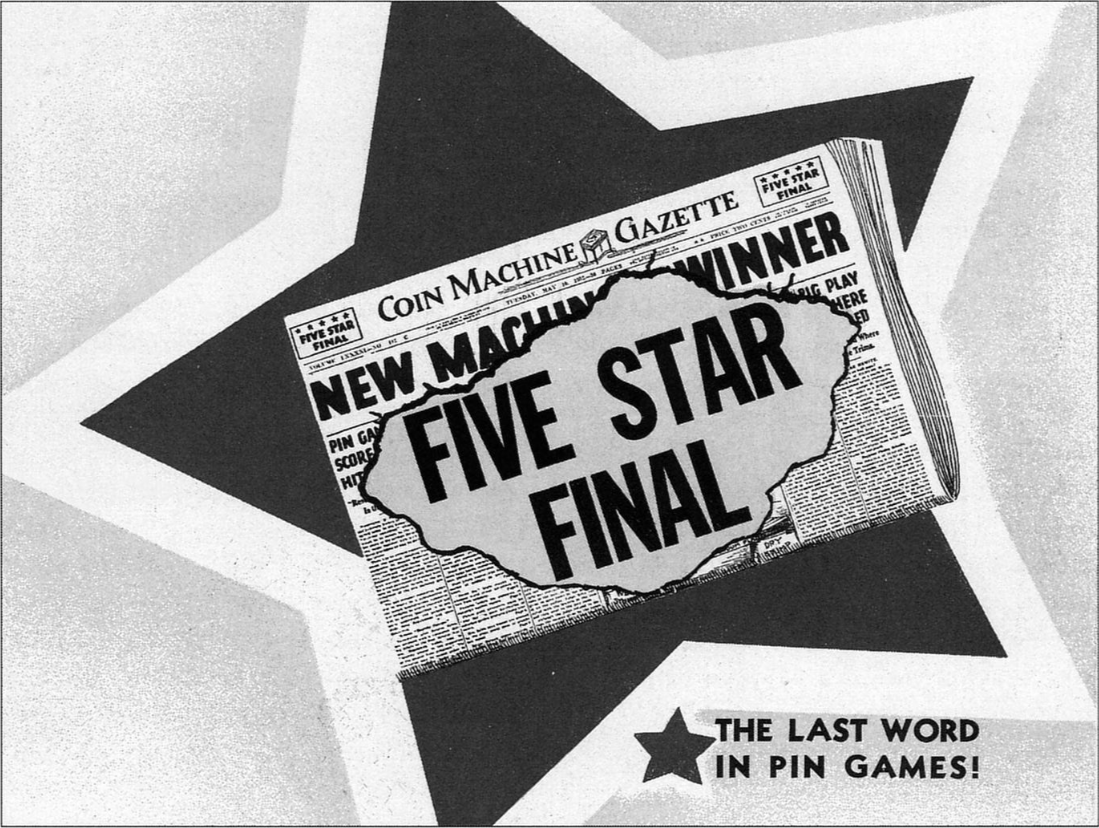

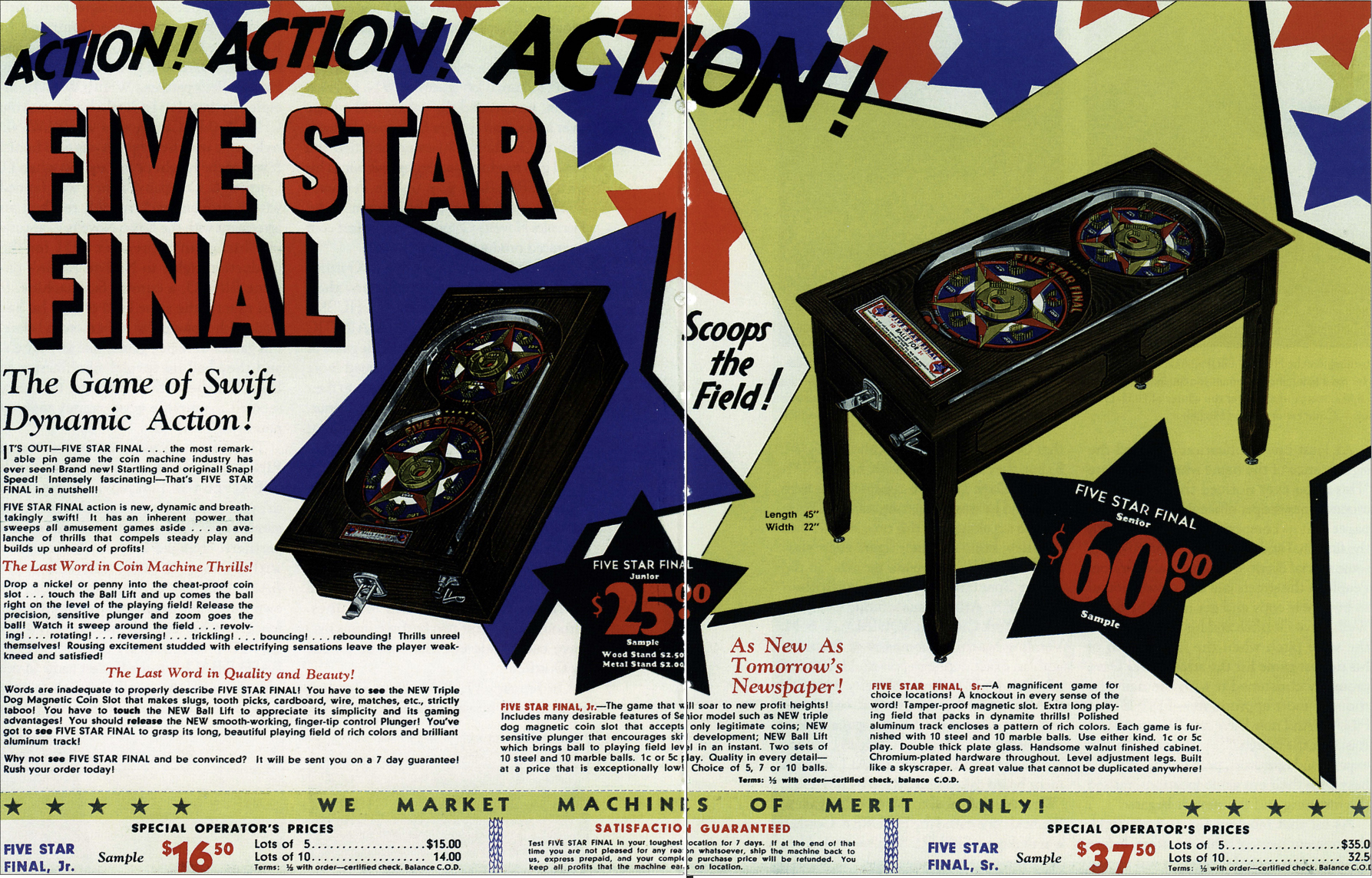

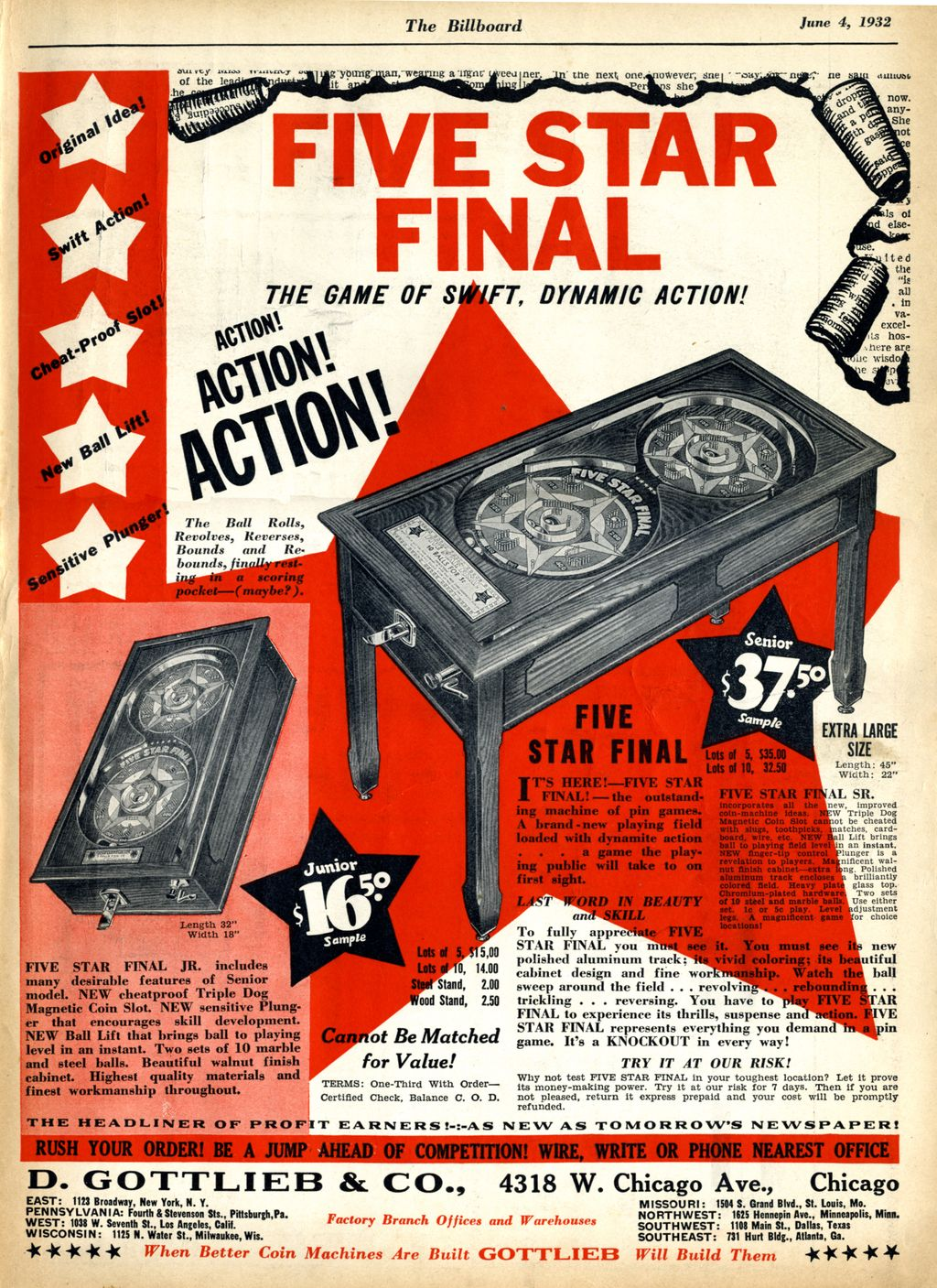

The name "five star final" also referred to several other notable items from the early 1930's. This included a movie nominated for best picture named Five Star Final and the play the film was based on, also named Five Star Final.

== Components ==
=== Cabinet ===
The cabinet of Five Star Final is rectangular and wooden with the playfield contained inside under glass.

=== Playfield ===
The playfield is a wooden surface beneath the glass top, designed to guide a ball around the figure eight and up onto the higher of the circles before gravity pulls the ball towards the second playfield and the bottom. Balls are placed into the playfield with the plunger, a spring-loaded device that consists of a rod extending through the cabinet wall and fitted with a spring. Balls are guided around the ball channel by a polished aluminum track on the inside of the cabinet. The playfield features two red, blue and white circles around a gold and red five pointed star design; each of these circles includes seven scoring cups.

=== Coin mechanism ===
The coin mechanism is a coin controlled system that governs ball release. Five Star Final was designed for both 1 and 5 cent play and came with 10 steel and 10 marble balls allowing the operators to choose the preferred ball type. The normally locked, manually operated lever when activated by a coin shifts the sliding gate beneath the playfield. This clears the playfield of any balls from the previous game and resets the board.. Five Star Final introduced a more tamper proof "triple-dog" coin mechanism that Gottlieb used on subsequent machines such as Cloverleaf.

=== Ball lift mechanism ===
The manual ball lift mechanism quickly returns balls to the launch position and gives the player more control over the ball.

== Gameplay ==
After inserting a coin, the player receives a series of up to ten balls to launch onto the playfield. They attempt to get these balls to land in scoring holes, with a point value ranging from 100 to 2000. Lower values are in easier to reach areas while the largest points (1000 and 2000) are in the most difficult to reach center of each figure eight.

=== Scoring Points ===
In the game of Five Star Final players score points by launching balls onto an inclined playfield and aiming for them to land in the various scoring holes. The game combines elements of skill and chance. Play continues by launching balls until all balls have been played and rest on the playfield. When play has completed the player then counts their score by adding up all scoring holes that contain balls, with the yellow/gold ball double the point value of the hole where it landed.

=== Gameplay techniques ===
The primary skill of Five Star Final involves the application of the proper amount of tension on the plunger. The amount of tension and the angle at which the plunger is manipulated to strike the ball affects the speed and angle of attack the ball has when it reaches the playfield. The playfield has a polished aluminum track on the inside of the figure eight that protects the wood playfield.

Players can influence the movement of the ball by slightly moving or bumping the machine cabinet, a technique known as "nudging". Five Star Final predates all tilt mechanisms which guard against excessive manipulation of this sort.

== Video game simulations ==
Five Star Final Jr. has been recreated as a Visual Pinball recreation

Visual Pinball provides a way for the player to experience the Five Star Final Jr. game without having to travel to one of the few locations where it can be seen/played, such as Pinball Gallery.

== Legacy ==
At the end of the 20th century it was still remembered as an important foundational pinball machine.
