= Lights...Camera...Action! (pinball) =

1989 pinball machine

- Manufacturer: Gottlieb
- Release date: December 1989
- Design: Jon Norris
- Artwork: Constantino Mitchell, Brian R. Johnson, Jeanine Mitchell
- Sound: Dave Zabriskie
- Production run: 1,708

Lights...Camera...Action! is a pinball machine designed by Jon Norris and released by Gottlieb in 1989. The game features a movie making theme.

== Description ==
This is the first of Jon Norris' designs to use a timed mode feature.

The game uses two 20-digit alpha numeric displays. John Borg designed one of the devices on this machine, and recorded one of the voices.

There are five movie scenes which need to be completed - the gunfight scene, the multiball scene, the stair scene, the jackpot scene, and the stunt scene.

Lights...Camera...Action! was pinball’s first mode based game. It is based on Gottlieb's system 3, since system 80B could not handle its demands. The design was originally a card game. The spinner draw card feature was retained, but the rest of the pinball machine rules were adapted from the cancelled pinball machine Red Alert.

The pinball machine has a mechanical backbox animation in which handguns raised in a draw. The mode starts when the ball falls into the top hole. The player has to press the right flipper to beat the villain. At the top of the backbox are colored floodlights. The upper left of the playfield contains a rotating mini-playfield.

In multiplayer games there is a "catch-up" score feature which increases the scores of players at the end of each ball.

== Digital versions ==
Lights...Camera...Action! released as a licensed table of The Pinball Arcade on several platforms in 2014.
