= Waterworld (pinball) =

1995 pinball machine

'Waterworld'
- Manufacturer: Gottlieb
- Release date: October 1995
- System: Gottlieb System 3
- Design: Ray Tanzer, Jon Norris
- Artwork: Constantino Mitchell, Scott Melchionda
- Music: Duane Decker
- Production run: 1,500

Waterworld is a pinball machine designed by Ray Tanzer and Jon Norris and released by Gottlieb in October 1995. It is based on the film of the same name. This is one of the final pinball machines made by Gottlieb followed only by Mario Andretti and Barb Wire in 1996.
