= Black Hole (pinball) =

1981 pinball machine

- Manufacturer: Gottlieb
- Release date: October 1981
- System: Gottlieb System 80
- Model #: 668
- Players: 1-4
- Design: Joe Cicak, Jerry Yingst (prototype); John Buras, Adolf Seitz Jr. (final design)
- Artwork: Terry Doerzaph
- Production run: 8,774

Black Hole is a widebody pinball machine released in 1981 by Gottlieb. It is notable for having two playfields: one on top with a conventional slope, and one mounted underneath, sloping away from the player. It has no connection with the 1979 film of the same name.

== Design ==
=== Prototype design ===
After seeing a solid state pinball machine being repaired, Joe Cicak saw that, unlike an electromechanical pinball machine, the cabinet underneath the playfield was largely empty and that there was space for a secondary playfield. While watching an episode of Carl Sagan's Cosmos at a friend's house which included black holes, he mentioned his idea of a lower playfield. After talking through a number of ideas they decided to attempt to create a pinball machine called Black Hole. Joe Cicak and Jerry Yingst sketched out possible layouts. After attempting to create a design using a full, see-through main playfield, they changed this to a layout using a window for the player to see the lower playfield. The lower playfield was angled away from the player, in the opposite direction to the main playfield. This allowed the lower playfield to be larger while keeping the viewing window on the main playfield small enough. The window in the main playfield caused challenges such as the joint between the flexiglass window and the wood of the rest of the playfield, but over a 12-week period the issues were mostly overcome and Joe Cicak built a microprocessor-controlled proof-of-concept prototype machine. Part way through this process Williams released the first solid-state pinball machine with two playfields, Black Knight. It was decided to show the prototype to Gottlieb. Jerry Yingst took the machine to Chicago, where Gottlieb's VP of Operations Gil Pollock approved it, and he bought the concept of the game. Gottlieb didn't acknowledge the concept had come from outside the company until several years later. The prototype and production versions of the machine use a tube to return balls that drain from the lower playfield back to the main playfield, though the power to activate a solenoid to kick a ball up this tube was not calibrated in the prototype.

=== Gottlieb design ===
The concept of the game was chosen to gain market share from competing pinball manufacturers, and to combat the "onslaught of video games".

Black Hole is the first machine to feature a lower playfield viewed through a window in the upper playfield, and was protected with a patent. This window is made from blue perspex, and two different tones of blue are used as the main playfield colors. A rotating metal coil is used to move the ball from the top playfield to the lower playfield.

The mirrored backglass contains a spinning disc with a spiral design surrounded by strobing lights. The painting for the backglass was created using an airbrush. The artist for the game, Terry Doerzaph, said Richard Tracy conceived of the idea for the infinity effect on the backglass.

Black Hole's robotic speech is generated by a Votrax SC-01; some machines for the export market were produced without this speech capability. These export machines also use a simpler backglass.

The game uses 6 digit displays.

Pre-production games went to test locations in September 1981, and after receiving positive player reaction surveys went into production with no changes.

== Layout ==
The playfield is longer than on a typical pinball machine. At the top of the machine are three rollover lanes above three pop bumpers in an irregular formation. The left side of the machine has a bank of five drop targets (B-L-A-C-K), and the right side has a bank of four drop targets (H-O-L-E), further down the right side are four further targets. Towards the top left of the playfield is a lane leading back to the rollovers, and another, called the gravity tunnel, with a spinner that loops back to the entrance to the lower playfield. The main playfield has three flippers at the bottom, and another partway up the left side above another pop bumper.

The lower playfield has two flippers, positioned to flip the ball towards the player. This playfield contains two pop bumpers, sets of three and four drop-targets. A captive hole is behind the bank of four drop-targets.

== Gameplay ==
The player can increase the bonus multiplier by completing the rollovers at the top of the main playfield, but the bonus itself can only be increased on the lower playfield. This bonus is shown on an additional display on the machine. Scores on the lower playfield only add to this bonus. If the player does not complete a target bank on the lower playfield, the ball drains when it returns to the main playfield; if it is completed then a gate moves to keep the ball in play.

The game has a three ball multiball, with a ball locked on each playfield. This is played with balls on both playfields.

Completing B-L-A-C-K and H-O-L-E drop targets increases various scoring elements, with completing B-L-A-C-K and then H-O-L-E in sequence lighting a score multiplier on the lower playfield.

== Reception ==
Roger Sharpe reviewed the game for Play Meter, awarding it 3.5/4, noting it could be called "a new level in pinball".

Upon its release, Black Hole was deemed challenging to maintain.

One early operator reported the game earning over $700 in a week, the first Gottlieb pinball game which cost 50¢ to play. By December 1981 it was the top earning pinball machine in Play Meter's equipment poll, exceeding income from most video games.

In Japan, Game Machine listed Black Hole on their June 1, 1983 issue as being the eighth most-successful flipper unit of the year.

== Eclipse ==
A single-level version of the game with different artwork called Eclipse was created both as completed machines, and as kits for the export market. Most of the kits were used to convert James Bond 007 games that operators were unhappy with.

== Digital versions ==
The game is included in the Pinball Hall of Fame: The Gottlieb Collection.

Black Hole released as a licensed table of The Pinball Arcade for several platforms in 2012.

=== Other versions ===
A 1/6 scale replica of the machine was produced by New Wave Toys in 2024. This includes lights and sounds but does not function as a pinball game.

== In popular culture ==
The phrase "Do You Dare To Enter The Black Hole?" which the machine says during attract mode was etched in the vinyl runout grooves on LP versions of the band Hovercraft's 1997 album, Akathisia.
