= Microsoft Pinball Arcade =

1998 video game

- Cover art for the Windows version
- Developers: Microsoft; Saffire (GBC)
- Publishers: Microsoft Home; Classified Games (GBC, US); Cryo Interactive (GBC, PAL)
- Platforms: Microsoft Windows, Game Boy Color
- Release: PC: December 15, 1998; GBC: 2001
- Genre: Pinball
- Modes: Single-player, multiplayer

Microsoft Pinball Arcade is a pinball video game from Microsoft. It was released on December 15, 1998, for Microsoft Windows and in 2001 for the Game Boy Color. The game is a collection of seven real pinball tables licensed from Gottlieb. These include one from each decade: Baffle Ball (1931), Humpty Dumpty (1947), Knock Out (1950), Slick Chick (1963), Spirit of 76 (1975), Haunted House (1982), and Cue Ball Wizard (1992).

This game was designed for Windows 9x and Windows NT 4.0. The resolution of the PC version could be set up to 1024x768.

A free trial PC version was released, with Haunted House as the only playable table up to a limited score.

The Game Boy Color version features five tables, excluding Humpty Dumpty and Cue Ball Wizard.

== Gameplay ==
Microsoft Pinball Arcade uses the game rules from the original tables. The game shows the layout of each table, with details of points available from each feature. The view of each table is fixed, with no scrolling; the scores are displayed in the corner of the screen in the style of the original games. The earlier five games do not have music on the original pinball machines, and have an appropriate type of music added.

== Reception ==
Reception

Review scores
Publication	Score
Computer Gaming World	PC: 3/5
IGN	PC: 5.2/10
Nintendo Power	GBC: 6.5/10
Gamespot	PC: 6.2/10

GameSpot praised the game for its faithful reproduction of the sound effects, detailed high-quality graphics, and realistic ball physics. IGN enjoyed the graphics, but found much of the gameplay and sounds boring although did enjoy Haunted House. CGW noted that the game includes some entertaining tables, and some of "purely historical" value. Reviewing a beta version, GameRoom noted that "only a pinball machine can be a pinball machine", but were still impressed with the graphics and sound. Pinball Player said it was the best pinball-based game for the home computer.

Nintendo Power found the ball moved "curiously slow."

In 2025 Pixel Addict said the simulation is good, but "a little glacial."

== See also ==
- Full Tilt! Pinball (Space Cadet is included with several Windows releases)
- The Pinball Arcade
- Visual Pinball
