= Humpty Dumpty (pinball) =

1947 pinball machine

- Manufacturer: D. Gottlieb & Co.
- Release date: October 25, 1947
- System: Electro-mechanical
- Model #: 1
- Players: 1
- Design: Harry Mabs
- Artwork: Roy Parker
- Production run: 6,500 units

Humpty Dumpty is a pinball machine released by Gottlieb on October 25, 1947. It is the first pinball machine to include electromechanical flippers — invented by Harry Mabs — distinguishing it from earlier machines. Named after the nursery rhyme character Humpty Dumpty, it is the first in a series of seven similar machines themed on fairy tales and uses a series of lights to animate Humpty Dumpty. In 2025 it was inaugurated into the Amusement Industry Hall of Fame.

== Flippers ==
The invention of flippers by Harry Mabs was "quite accidental". After pulling two wires out of the side of a machine and touching them together he got the idea to put buttons on the side of the cabinet. Because of limitations in electrical current this and similar games required multiple flippers to hit the ball to the top of the playfield. Prior to this game players could only control a pinball machine with the plunger shot, and by nudging. The game is controlled with two buttons, on of either side of the machine. Each of these controls a single coil on that side of the machine which activates three flippers which are mechanically connected underneath the playfield. To underscore the element of skill, Harry Mabs called these buttons "control buttons". The addition of flippers in this and subsequent games helped operators fight against anti-gambling forces as the "skill factor" to control a game became more important than the "chance factor".

A game designer at Chicago Coin called John Gore suggested that the bat used on baseball amusement games could be used on a pinball machine, but the company never investigated developing its use into a flipper prior to the release of Humpty Dumpty. Chicago Coin did however file a patent in 1948, crediting Jerry Koci with the invention.

== Design ==
Original artwork for this game was created using the name "Flipper". The name was changed when it was discovered that a 1932 patented game called Flipper existed. Dave Gottlieb named the game after asking his son Alvin Gottlieb to show him a book of fairy tales. The backglass artwork shows Humpty Dumpty on a wall above numerous helpless maidens. Six lights progressively light his fall, with the final light illuminating a cracked Humpty Dumpty on the ground.

The game is the first in a series of seven Fairy Tale games, all of which include an backglass animation. All games in this series have six flippers and use the same playfield layout. The final game in the series, Alice Adventures in Wonderland released in August 1948 with 1,000 units produced, had the smallest production run of all.

Humpty Dumpty 1947 Gottlieb pinball machine

Games were typically sold for US$150.

Like other contemporary pinball games, Humpty Dumpty was constructed with wood and had backlit scoring in preset units of scoring rather than mechanical reel or electronic LED scoring.

== Layout and gameplay ==
Humpty Dumpty is a five-ball game. The six flippers are arranged around the playfield, all facing outwards. There are two kickout holes towards the bottom of the playfield. Near the corners of the playfield are four dead bumpers which advance the bonus score, and if hit in order by the player lights the top hole for "extra special". The location of the flippers was said by Pinball Collectors Quarterly to be like the designer treating them as bumpers, which was reinforced by Gottlieb calling them "Flipper Bumpers", a name which lasted on subsequent games for only one year.

== Release and legacy ==
A series of adverts began in Billboard, starting on October 11, 1947 declaring "You'll fall for Humpty Dumpty!" Further adverts appeared, with the November 1 issue including a statement released by Gottlieb on October 25. This statement said test play indicated that the game would be well-received by operators and players.

Humpty Dumpty was shown at the Coin Machines Industries convention at the Sherman House hotel. By the end of 1947 every pinball manufacturer had either produced or started to develop their own pinball machines with flippers.

By late 1947 heavy advance orders had been received for the game. The president of Gottlieb said "This player-controlled game is the shot-in-the-arm that has long been needed by the Industry."

In 1982 Pinball Collectors Quarterly called Humpty Dumpty a "truly revolutionary game which changed an entire industry". They characterized it as a "pre-flipper" game which doesn't play very well after standards set later than 1948 due to the minimal control players could have on the ball. Its larger effect was to eliminate gambling from amusement pinball.

In 2008, the Popular Mechanics website included the machine on a list of the top eight most innovative pinball machines of all time.

Humpty Dumpty was the only game inducted into the Amusement Industry Hall of Fame in 2025; the honor was accepted by the grandson of the founder of Gottlieb on behalf of the creators of the machine.

== Digital versions ==
Humpty Dumpty was included in the 1998 Windows version of pinball simulation video game Microsoft Pinball Arcade, but not in the Game Boy Color version.
