= Ace High (pinball) =

1957 pinball machine

- Manufacturer: Gottlieb
- Release date: February, 1957
- Design: Wayne Neyens
- Artwork: Roy Parker
- Production run: 2,100

Ace High is a woodrail pinball machine released by Gottlieb in 1957. It features a card gambling theme. It should not be confused with Aces High by Bally.

== Description ==
The backglass of Ace High carries Gottlieb's famous slogan: "Amusement Pinballs, as American as Baseball and Hot Dogs!". The game has two gobble holes and was the last single player pinball machine to have power to the flippers after the game is over.

== Digital versions ==
Ace High is available in the Pinball Hall of Fame: The Gottlieb Collection.
