= Gottlieb =

Pinball and arcade game manufacturer

D. Gottlieb & Co.
- Logo from 1980

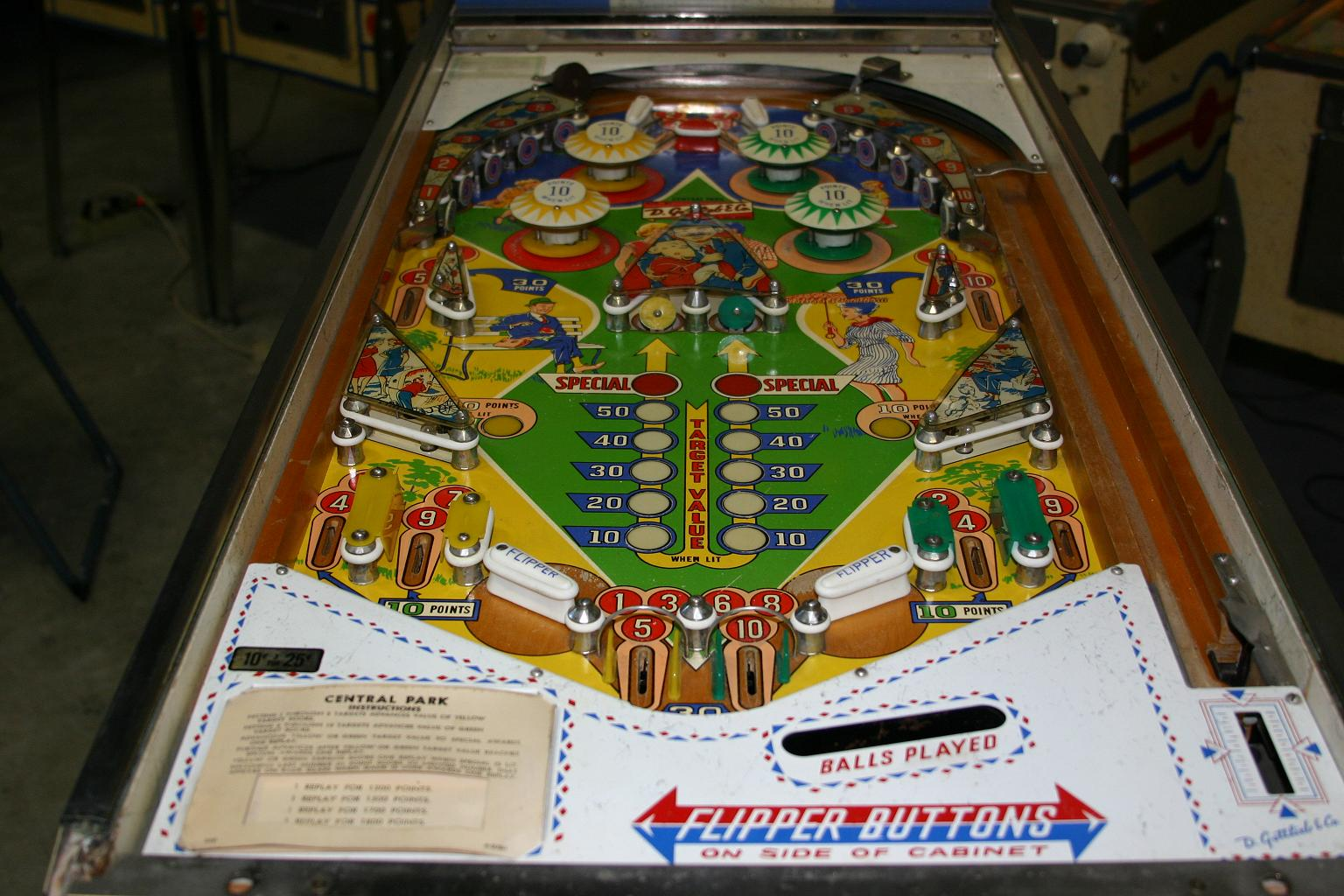
- Central Park, a 1966 pinball machine by Gottlieb
- Trade name: Gottlieb
- Founded: 1927; 99 years ago (as D. Gottlieb & Co.); Chicago, Illinois, U.S.
- Founder: David Gottlieb
- Defunct: 1996
- Successor: Gottlieb Development LLC; Sony Pictures Consumer Products
- Products: Pinball; Arcade video game
- Parent: Columbia Pictures (1976–1984)

Gottlieb (formerly D. Gottlieb & Co.) was an American arcade game corporation based in Chicago, Illinois. It is best known for creating a vast line of pinball machines and arcade games (including Q*bert) throughout much of the 20th century.

== History ==
Gottlieb's main office and plant was at 1140-50 N. Kostner Avenue until the early 1970s, when a new modern plant and office were opened at 165 W. Lake Street in Northlake, IL. A subassembly plant was also built in Fargo, ND.

The company was established by David Gottlieb in 1927 with his brother Sol, and initially produced only pinball machines. In October 1932 the company moved to a factory four times the size of its previous one. It later expanded into various other games, including pitch-and-bats, bowling games, and eventually video arcade games (notably Reactor, Q*bert and M*A*C*H*3.)

Like other manufacturers, Gottlieb first made mechanical pinball machines, including the first successful coin-operated pinball machine Baffle Ball in 1931. Electromechanical machines were produced starting in 1935. During the second world war Gottlieb ceased production of pinball machines in favor of war work. The 1947 development of player-actuated, solenoid-driven 2-inch bats called "flippers" revolutionized the industry, giving players the ability to shoot the ball back up into the playfield for more points. Flippers first appeared on a Gottlieb game called Humpty Dumpty, designed by Harry Mabs. By this time, the games also became noted for their artwork by Roy Parker.

In the late 1950s, Gottlieb made more widespread use of numerical score reels, making multiple player games more practical than the traditional scoring expressed by cluttered series of lights in the back box. Score reels eventually appeared on single-player games, now known as "wedgeheads" because of their distinctive tapered back box shape. By the 1970s, artwork on Gottlieb games was almost always by Gordon Morison, and the company had begun designing their games with longer 3-inch flippers, now the industry standard.

The company made the move into solid state machines starting in the late 1970s. The first few of these were remakes of electromechanical machines such as Cleopatra (in 1977), Joker Poker and Charlie's Angels. By that time, multiple player machines were more the mode and wedgeheads were no longer being produced. The last wedgehead was T.K.O. (1979) and the last single player machine was Asteroid Annie and The Aliens (1980).

Gottlieb was bought by Columbia Pictures for $47 million in 1976. By 1979 it had approximately 650 employees. Gottlieb released Q*bert in 1982, which would become immensely successful and is an icon of the golden age of arcade games. In 1983, the year after the Coca-Cola Company had acquired Columbia, Gottlieb was renamed Mylstar Electronics, but this proved to be short-lived. By 1984 the video game industry in North America was in the middle of a shakeout and Columbia closed down Mylstar at the end of September 1984. A management group, led by Gilbert G. Pollock, purchased Mylstar's pinball assets in October 1984 and continued the manufacture of pinball machines under a new company, Premier Technology. On 1985, certain assets of Gottlieb/Mylstar's video game division were sold to JVW Electronics, a Chicago-based electronics company founded by three former Gottlieb/Mylstar executives: John C. Von Lessen, William Jacobs, and Ron Waxman. As a result of this a number of prototype Mylstar arcade games, which were not purchased by the investors, were never released. Premier did go on to produce one last arcade game, 1989's Exterminator. Premier Technology, which returned to selling pinball machines under the name Gottlieb after the purchase, continued in operation until the summer of 1996. By 1992, Premier had started to create redemption and other gaming coin-op machines.

Gottlieb's most popular pinball machine was Baffle Ball (released mid-1931), and their final machine was Barb Wire (early 1996).

== Licensing and rights ==
The 1965 machine Gottlieb's Kings & Queens is the one played by the title character in the 1975 rock opera movie Tommy about a psychosomatically blind, deaf, and mute pinball wizard. Today, Gottlieb's pinball machines (along with those distributed under the Mylstar and Premier names), as well as the "Gottlieb" and "D. Gottlieb & Co." trademarks (USPTO registration nos. 1403592, 2292766, and 3288024, and other numbers in countries around the world), are owned by Gottlieb Development LLC of Pelham Manor, New York. Most of Gottlieb and Mylstar's video games are currently owned by Columbia Pictures.

== Gottlieb video games ==
=== Published ===
- No Man's Land (1980) – licensed from Universal
- New York! New York! (1981) – licensed from Sigma Enterprises
- Reactor (1982)
- Q*bert (1982)
- Mad Planets (1983)
- Krull (1983)
- Juno First (1983) – licensed from Konami
- M.A.C.H. 3 (1983) – laserdisc game; published under Mylstar name
- Us vs. Them (1984) – laserdisc game; published under Mylstar name
- The Three Stooges In Brides Is Brides (1984) – published under Mylstar name
- Q*bert Qubes (1983) – published under Mylstar name
- Curve Ball (1984) – published under Mylstar name
- Exterminator (1989) – published under Premier Technology name

=== Unreleased prototypes ===
- Gridlee (1982) – licensed from Videa, Inc.
- Argus (1982) – a.k.a. Videoman, Protector and Guardian
- Insector (1982)
- Arena (1982) – Early-development stages of Wiz Warz
- Quizimodo (1982)
- Knightmare (1983)
- Faster, Harder, More Challenging Q*bert (1983) – developed under Mylstar name
- Screw Loose (1983) – developed under Mylstar name
- Tylz (1984) – developed under Mylstar name
- Video Vince and the Game Factory (1984) – developed under Mylstar name
- Wiz Warz (1984) – developed under Mylstar name

== Gottlieb pinball machines ==
=== Pure mechanical pinball/bagatelle machines ===
Incomplete list:

- Bingo (1931)
- Bingo Ball (1931)
- Baffle Ball (1931)
- Stop and Sock (1931)
- Mibs (1931)
- Baffle Ball Sr. (1932)
- Play-Boy (1932)
- Play-Boy Sr. (1932)
- Whizz-Bang (1932)
- Five Star Final (1932)
- Five Star Final Jr. (1932)
- Five Star Final Sr. (1932)
- Cloverleaf (1932)
- Brokers Tip (1933)
- Big Broadcast (1933)
- Big Broadcast Sr. (1933)
- Speedway (1933)
- Scoreboard (1933)
- Black Beauty (1934)
- Firestone (1934)
- Jungle Hunt (1935)
- Par-Golf (1935)

Early Gottlieb logo from 1947

=== Electromechanical pinball/flipperless machines ===
Incomplete list:

- Relay (1934)
- Sunshine Baseball (1936)
- Playboy (1937)
- Humpty Dumpty #1 (1947)
- Miss America (1947)
- Lady Robin Hood (1947)
- Jack 'n Jill (1948)
- Olde King Cole (1948)
- K. C. Jones (1949)
- Bank-A-Ball #34 (1950)
- Buffalo Bill (1950)
- Knock Out (1950)
- Triplets #40 (1950)
- Minstrel Man (1951)
- Disc Jockey (1952)
- Happy Go Lucky (1952)
- Skill Pool (1952)
- Queen of Hearts (1952)
- Quartette (1952)
- Quintette (1953)
- Gold Star (1954)
- Sweet Heart (1954)
- Dragonette (1954)
- Diamond Lill (1954)
- Hawaiian Beaty (1954)
- Lady Luck (1954)
- Frontiersman (1955)
- Southern Belle (1955)
- Wishing Well #107 (1955)
- Classy Bowler (1956)
- Rainbow (1956)
- Derby Day (1956)
- Harbor Lights (1956)
- Ace High (1957)
- Silver (1957)
- World Champ (1957)
- Brite Star (1958)
- Contest (1958)
- Criss Cross (1958)
- Picnic (1958)
- Rocket Ship (1958)
- Queen of Diamonds (1959)
- Sweet Sioux (1959)
- World Beauties (1959)
- Around the world (1959)
- Dancing Dolls (1960)
- Flipper (1960)
- Spot-A-Card (1960)
- Texan (1960)
- Foto Finish (1961)
- Corral (1961)
- Cover Girls (1962)
- Flipper Clown (1962)
- Olympics (1962)
- Liberty Belle (1962)
- Rack-A-Ball (1962)
- Sunset (1962)
- Flying Chariots (1963)
- Gigi (1963)
- Slick Chick (1963)
- Sweet Hearts (1963)
- Swing Along (1963)
- North Star (1964)
- Bowling Queen (1964)
- Bonanza (1964)
- Happy Clown (1964)
- Ship Mates (1964)
- World Fair (1964)
- Kings & Queens (1965)
- Sky Line (1965)
- Paradise 2 player game (1965)
- Cow Poke (1965)
- Bank-A-Ball (1965)
- Central Park (1966)
- Cross Town / Subway (1966) - last machines with manual ball lift
- Dancing Lady (1966)
- Hawaiian Isle (1966)
- Rancho (1966)
- Hi-Score (1967)
- Sea Side (1967)
- Hit-A-Card (1967)
- Sing Along (1967)
- Super Duo (1967)
- Super Score (1967)
- Surf Side (1967)
- Four Seasons (1968)
- Domino (1968)
- Fun Park (1968)
- Fun Land (1968)
- Paul Bunyan (1968)
- Royal Guard (1968)
- Hi-Lo (1969)
- Airport (1969)
- Road Race (1969)
- Groovy (1970)
- Aquarius (1970)
- Batter Up (1970)
- Flip-A-Card (1970)
- Snow Derby 2 player game (1970)
- Snow Queen 4 player game (1970)
- Dimension (1971)
- PlayBall (1971)
- 4 Square (1971)
- 2001 #298 (1971)
- Lawman (1971)
- Sheriff (1971)
- Star Trek (1971)
- Astro (1971)
- Flying Carpet #310 (1972)
- Jungle (1972)
- King Kool (1972)
- Outer Space 2 player game (1972)
- Jumping Jack (2 player)/Jack In The Box (4 player) (1973)
- Jungle King (1 player) (1973)
- Wild Life (2 player) (1973)
- Jungle (4 player) (1973)
- Pro Pool (1973)
- Pro-Football (1973)
- Big Shot 2 player game (1973)
- Hot Shot 4 player game (1973)
- High Hand (1973)
- King Pin (1973)
- Top Card 1 player game (1974)
- Big Indian #356 (1974)
- Far Out 4 player game (1974)
- Out of Sight 2 player game (1974)
- Duotron 2 player game (1974)
- Magnotron 4 player game (1974)
- Sky Jump (1974)
- Spin Out (1975)
- Super Soccer #367 (1975)
- Quick Draw (1975)
- Fast Draw #379 (1975)
- Abracadabra #380 (1975)
- Spirit of 76 #381 (1975)
- Spin Out (1975)
- Pioneer #382 (1975)
- "300" #388 (1975)
- Atlantis (1975)
- El Dorado (1975)
- Buccaneer (1976)
- Surf Champ (1976)
- Card Whiz 2 player version of Royal Flush (1976)
- Royal Flush 4 player version of Card Whiz (1976)
- Sure Shot (1976)
- Bank Shot (1976)
- Target Alpha (1976)
- Volley (1976)
- Solar City (1976)
- Bronco 4 player game (1977)
- Golden Arrow (1977)
- Fire Queen 2 player game (1977)
- Jet Spin 4 player game (1977)
- Super Spin 2 player game (1977)
- Mustang 2 player game (1977)
- Genie (1977)
- Team One (1977)
- Vulcan 4 player version of Fire Queen (1977)
- Cleopatra (1977)
- Fire Queen (1977)
- Gridiron (1977)
- Jacks Open (1977)
- Lucky Hand (1977)
- Jungle Queen 4 player version of Jungle Princess (1977)
- Jungle Princess (1977)
- Pyramid (1978)
- Strange World (1978)
- Neptune (1978)
- Sinbad (1978)
- Eye Of The Tiger (1978)
- Poseidon (1978)
- Hit the Deck (1978)
- Joker Poker (1978)
- Close Encounters of the Third Kind (1978)
- Dragon (1978)
- Gemini (1978)
- Rock Star (1978)
- Blue Note (1979)
- T.K.O. (1979)
- Space Walk (1979)

=== System 1 Pinball Machines ===
- Cleopatra #409 (1977) (was also released as two EM versions (Cleopatra, 4 player and Pyramid, 2 player))
- Sinbad #412 (1978) (was also released as an EM version)
- Joker Poker #417 (1978) (was also released as an EM version)
- Dragon #419 (1978) (was also released as an EM version)
- Solar Ride #421 (1979) (was also released as an EM version)
- Charlie's Angels #425 (1978) (was also released as an EM version)
- Close Encounters of the Third Kind #424 (1978) - 9,950 Solid State games and 470 Electro-Mechanical games made
- Count-Down #422 (1979) - 9,899 Games made (Also released as a 2 player EM version as Space Walk)
- Pinball Pool #427 (1979) - 7,200 Games made
- Totem #429 (1979) - 6,643 Games made
- The Incredible Hulk #433 (1979) - 6,150 Games made, a few of these games had System 80 electronics to test the new System 80 platform as model #500.
- Genie #435 (1979) - Wide body game. 6,800 Games made
- Buck Rogers #437 (1980) - 7,410 Games made
- Torch #438 (1980) - 3,880 Games made
- Roller Disco #440 (1980) - Wide body game with bright neon colors. 2,400 games made
- Asteroid Annie and the Aliens #442 (1980) - (The only single player System 1 Pinball Game and also the last System 1 game!) Only 211 games made

=== System 80 pinball machines ===
- Panthera #652 (1980)
- The Amazing Spider-Man #653 (1980)
- Circus #654 (1980)
- Counterforce #656 (1980)
- Star Race #657 (1980)
- James Bond 007 #658 (1980)
- Time Line #659 (1980)
- Force II #661 (1981)
- Pink Panther #664 (1981)
- Mars God of War #666 (1981)
- Volcano #667 (1981)
- Black Hole #668 (1981)
- Haunted House #669 (1982)
- Eclipse #671 (1982)

=== System 80A pinball machines ===
- Devil's Dare #670 (1982)
- Rocky #672 (1982)
- Spirit #673 (1982)
- Punk! #674 (1982)
- Caveman #PV810 (1982) (features an additional video game screen and a joystick)
- Striker #675 (1982)
- Krull #676 (1983)
- Q*bert's Quest #677 (1983) – based on the Q*bert video game
- Super Orbit #680 (1983)
- Royal Flush Deluxe #681 (1983)
- Goin' Nuts #682 (1983)
- Amazon Hunt #684 (1983)
- Rack 'Em Up! #685 (1983)
- Ready...Aim...Fire! #686 (1983)
- Jacks to Open #687 (1984)
- Touchdown #688 (1984)
- Alien Star #689A (1984)
- The Games #691 (1984)
- El Dorado City of Gold #692 (1984)
- Ice Fever #695 (1985)

=== System 80B pinball machines ===
- Bounty Hunter #694 (1985)
- Chicago Cubs Triple Play #696 (1985)
- Rock #697 (1985)
- Tag-Team Pinball #698 (1985)
- Ace High #700 (1985) – never produced
- Raven #702 (1986)
- Hollywood Heat #703 (1986)
- Rock Encore #704 (1986) – conversion kit for Rock
- Genesis #705 (1986)
- Spring Break #706 (1987)
- Gold Wings #707 (1986)
- Monte Carlo #708 (1987)
- Arena #709 (1987)
- Victory #710 (1987)
- Diamond Lady #711 (1988)
- TX-Sector #712 (1988)
- Big House #713 (1988)
- Robo-War #714 (1988)
- Excalibur #715 (1988)
- Bad Girls #717 (1988)
- Hot Shots #718 (1989)
- Bone Busters, Inc. #719 (1989)

=== System 3 pinball machines ===
- Lights...Camera...Action! #720 (1989)
- Silver Slugger #722 (1990)
- Vegas #723 (1990)
- Deadly Weapon #724 (1990)
- Title Fight #726 (1990)
- Car Hop #725 (1991)
- Hoops #727 (1991)
- Cactus Jack's #729 (1991)
- Class of 1812 #730 (1991)
- Amazon Hunt III #684D (1991) – conversion kit
- Surf 'N Safari #731 (1991)
- Operation Thunder #732 (1992) – last Gottlieb machine to use an alphanumeric display
- Super Mario Bros. #733 (1992) – Based on the Super Mario Bros. video game by Nintendo; first Gottlieb machine to use a dot-matrix display (DMD). It was one of America's top ten best-selling pinball machines of 1992, receiving a Gold Award from the American Amusement Machine Association (AAMA).
- Super Mario Bros. - Mushroom World #N105 (1992)
- Cue Ball Wizard #734 (1992)
- Street Fighter II #735 (1993) – based on the Street Fighter II video game by Capcom; in 1995–1996, pinball machines were produced under the name Capcom, originally were made in the Gottlieb factory
- Tee'd Off #736 (1993)
- Gladiators #737 (1993)
- Wipe Out #738 (1993)
- Rescue 911 #740 (1994)
- World Challenge Soccer #741 (1994)
- Stargate #742 (1995) – based on the Stargate movie
- Shaq Attaq #743 (1995) – starring Shaquille O'Neal
- Freddy: A Nightmare on Elm Street #744 (1994) – based on the A Nightmare on Elm Street movie series
- Frank Thomas' Big Hurt #745 (1995)
- Waterworld #746 (1995) – based on the Waterworld movie
- Mario Andretti #747 (1995) – starring Mario Andretti
- Strikes 'n' Spares (1995)
- Barb Wire (pinball) #748 (1996) – based upon the Barb Wire film and comic
- Brooks N' Dunn #749 – This game was entering production just as Gottlieb shut down and ceased operations. Two prototype machines supposedly exist, although some claim the design never proceeded past the whitewood stage. Playfield components, such as plastics, ramps, mechanisms and Translites were produced for the games about to enter production; enough for about 10 games to exist. Only buggy prototype software exists and was never completed.

Gottlieb was last to introduce a solid-state system, and last to cease manufacture of electromechanical games. The first version of Gottlieb's solid state pinball hardware was called System 1, and had many undocumented features. Designed and developed by Rockwell International's Microelectronics Group of Newport Beach, CA with circuit board manufacturing and final assembly in El Paso, Texas. Likely it was rushed to compete with the new solid-state games from other manufacturers, particularly Bally. An entirely new platform was produced in 1980, System 80, which was refined in System 80A and System 80B. Following the System 80 platform, a new platform named System 3 was first released in 1989 and was used until the company's closure.

== See also ==
- Ed Krynski
