= List of Pinball FX (2023 video game) tables =

The Pinball FX series of games features an extensive range of predominantly licensed DLC. The following tables list the pinball tables available in Pinball FX (2023), Pinball FX VR (2025), and those released on the physical AtGames 4KP cabinets.

== Pinball FX table list ==
As of October 2026, Pinball FX features 146 on PlayStation, Xbox, and PC. The Nintendo Switch has a smaller library, as some older tables have not been ported to the platform; however, all tables not carried forward from Pinball FX3 have been released on it.

Note: EAL indicates table was released at launch of early access, and EA indicates it was launched within early access.

Table	License/Category	Pack	Pinball FX release date	Table first released in	Zen Table Designer
Fish Tales	Williams	free table	April 13, 2023	Pinball FX3	Peter "Deep" Grafl
Medieval Madness	Williams	Volume 1^{EAL}	March 31, 2022	Pinball FX3	Peter "Deep" Grafl
The Getaway: High Speed II	Williams	Volume 1^{EAL}	March 31, 2022	Pinball FX3	Peter "Deep" Grafl
Junk Yard	Williams	Volume 1^{EAL}	March 31, 2022	Pinball FX3	Peter "Deep" Grafl
Attack from Mars	Williams	Volume 2^{EAL}	March 31, 2022	Pinball FX3	Thomas Crofts
The Party Zone	Williams	Volume 2^{EAL}	March 31, 2022	Pinball FX3	Zoltan Vari
Black Rose	Williams	Volume 2^{EAL}	March 31, 2022	Pinball FX3	Peter Horvath
Theatre of Magic	Williams	Volume 3^{EAL}	March 31, 2022	Pinball FX3	Peter "Deep" Grafl
The Champion Pub	Williams	Volume 3^{EAL}	March 31, 2022	Pinball FX3	Peter "Deep" Grafl
Safe Cracker	Williams	Volume 3^{EAL}	March 31, 2022	Pinball FX3	Thomas Crofts
White Water	Williams	Volume 4^{EA}	May 26, 2022	Pinball FX3	Peter "Deep" Grafl
Red and Ted's Road Show	Williams	Volume 4^{EA}	May 26, 2022	Pinball FX3	Zoltan Vari
Hurricane	Williams	Volume 4^{EA}	May 26, 2022	Pinball FX3	Peter "Deep" Grafl
Tales of the Arabian Nights	Williams	Volume 5^{EA}	May 26, 2022	Pinball FX3	Zoltan Vari
Cirqus Voltaire	Williams	Volume 5^{EA}	May 26, 2022	Pinball FX3	Peter "Deep" Grafl
No Good Gofers	Williams	Volume 5^{EA}	May 26, 2022	Pinball FX3	Zoltan Vari
FunHouse	Williams	Volume 6^{EA}	June 30, 2022	Pinball FX3	Zoltan Vari
Space Station	Williams	Volume 6^{EA}	June 30, 2022	Pinball FX3	Peter "Deep" Grafl
Dr. Dude and His Excellent Ray	Williams	Volume 6^{EA}	June 30, 2022	Pinball FX3	Zoltan Vari
Swords of Fury	Williams	Volume 7^{EA}	May 26, 2022	Pinball FX	Thomas Crofts
The Machine: Bride of Pin-Bot	Williams	Volume 7^{EA}	June 30, 2022	Pinball FX	Zoltan Vari
Whirlwind	Williams	Volume 7	June 8, 2023	Pinball FX	Zoltan ’Pazo’ Pataki
Black Knight 2000	Williams	Volume 8	December 12, 2024	Pinball FX	Thomas Crofts
Banzai Run	Williams	Volume 8	December 12, 2024	Pinball FX	Zoltan Vari
Earthshaker	Williams	Volume 8	December 12, 2024	Pinball FX	Peter "Deep" Grafl
Pin-Bot	Williams	Volume 9	August 14, 2025	Pinball FX/FX VR/AtGames/mobile	
Taxi	Williams	Volume 9	August 14, 2025	Pinball FX/FX VR/AtGames/mobile	
Who Dunnit	Williams	Volume 9	August 14, 2025	Pinball FX/FX VR/AtGames/mobile	
Diner	Williams	Volume 10	April 30, 2026	Pinball FX/FX VR	
Comet	Williams	Volume 10	April 30, 2026	Pinball FX/FX VR	
Fire!	Williams	Volume 10	April 30, 2026	Pinball FX/FX VR	
Monster Bash	Williams	Universal Monsters^{EAL}	March 31, 2022	Pinball FX3	Peter "Deep" Grafl
Creature from the Black Lagoon	Williams	Universal Monsters^{EAL}	March 31, 2022	Pinball FX3	Zoltan Vari
Indiana Jones: The Pinball Adventure	Williams	single table^{EAL}	March 31, 2022	Pinball FX/FX3	Zoltan Vari
World Cup Soccer	Williams	single table^{EA}	October 20, 2022 (Note: removed on April 30, 2026 for licensing reasons)	Pinball FX	Zoltan ’Pazo’ Pataki
The Addams Family	Williams	single table	February 16, 2023	Pinball FX	Zoltan ’Pazo’ Pataki
Twilight Zone	Williams	single table	April 13, 2023	Pinball FX	Thomas Crofts w/ Anna Lengyel
Star Trek: The Next Generation	Williams	single table	August 24, 2023	Pinball FX	Zoltan Vari
Elvira and the Party Monsters	Williams	single table	October 16, 2025	Pinball FX/FX VR/mobile	
Scared Stiff	Williams	single table	October 16, 2025	Pinball FX/FX VR/mobile	
Judge Dredd	Williams	single table	October 22, 2026	Pinball FX/Pinball M/FX VR	
Sorcerer's Lair	Zen Originals	free table	April 13, 2023	Pinball FX2	Viktor Gyorei
Wild West Rampage	Zen Originals	free table^{EAL}	March 31, 2022	Pinball FX2	David "ndever" Szucs
Castlestorm	Zen Originals	single table^{EAL}	March 31, 2022	Pinball FX2	Gabor "coltos" Andrassy
Adventure Land	Zen Originals	Carnivals & Legends^{EAL}	March 31, 2022	Pinball FX3	Thomas Crofts
Son of Zeus	Zen Originals	Carnivals & Legends^{EAL}	March 31, 2022	Pinball FX3	Peter "Deep" Grafl
Rome	Zen Originals	Core Collection^{EAL}	March 31, 2022	Pinball FX2	Tamas Stephen
Biolab	Zen Originals	Core Collection^{EAL}	March 31, 2022	Pinball FX2	Imre "Emeric" Szigeti
Pasha	Zen Originals	Core Collection^{EAL}	March 31, 2022	Pinball FX2	Zoltan Somorjai
Secrets of the Deep	Zen Originals	Core Collection^{EAL}	March 31, 2022	Pinball FX2	Zoltan Vari
Epic Quest	Zen Originals	Charity Pack	December 7, 2023	Pinball FX2	Mate Szeplaki
Excalibur	Zen Originals	Charity Pack	December 7, 2023	Pinball FX1	Zoltan Vari
Curse of the Mummy	Zen Originals	Secrets & Shadows^{EAL}	March 31, 2022	Pinball FX	Anna Lengyel w/ Peter "Deep" Grafl
Pinball Noir	Zen Originals	Secrets & Shadows^{EAL}	March 31, 2022	Pinball FX	Zoltan Vari
Sky Pirates: Treasures of the Clouds	Zen Originals	Secrets & Shadows^{EAL}	March 31, 2022	Pinball FX	Peter “Pewet” Kovacs
Grimm Tales	Zen Originals	single table^{EA}	July 21, 2022	Pinball FX	Zoltan ’Pazo’ Pataki
Wrath of the Elder Gods	Zen Originals	single table^{EA}	November 17, 2022	Pinball FX	Gergely ’Gary’ Vadocz
A Samurai’s Vengeance	Zen Originals	Honor and Legacy	June 8, 2023	Pinball FX	Zoltan 'Hezol' Hegyi
Verne’s Mysterious Island	Zen Originals	Honor and Legacy	June 8, 2023	Pinball FX	Gergo 'rockger' Ezsias
Super League Football	Zen Originals	single table	May 16, 2024	Pinball FX2^{slf}	Thomas Crofts
Camp Bloodbrook	Zen Originals	single table	October 24, 2024 (Note: released on Steam on October 22, 2026)	Pinball M/FX	Daniel 'Dolby' Vigh
Star Wars™: Episode IV: A New Hope	Star Wars	Heroes Within^{EAL}	March 31, 2022	Pinball FX2	Peter "Deep" Grafl
Han Solo	Star Wars	Heroes Within^{EAL}	March 31, 2022	Pinball FX2	Zoltan Vari
Droids	Star Wars	Heroes Within^{EAL}	March 31, 2022	Pinball FX2	Thomas Crofts
Star Wars™ Pinball: Masters of the Force	Star Wars	Heroes Within^{EAL}	March 31, 2022	Pinball FX2	Zoltan Vari
Star Wars™: Episode V: The Empire Strikes Back	Star Wars	Star Wars Pinball^{EAL}	March 31, 2022	Pinball FX2	Peter "Deep" Grafl
Star Wars™: The Clone Wars	Star Wars	Star Wars Pinball^{EAL}	March 31, 2022	Pinball FX2	Ivan "Mad_Boy" Nicoara
Boba Fett	Star Wars	Star Wars Pinball^{EAL}	March 31, 2022	Pinball FX2	Zoltan Vari
Star Wars™: Episode VI: Return of the Jedi	Star Wars	Balance of the Force^{EA}	September 22, 2022	Pinball FX2	Peter "Deep" Grafl
Star Wars™: Starfighter Assault	Star Wars	Balance of the Force^{EA}	September 22, 2022	Pinball FX2	Tamas "Ypok" Pokrocz
Darth Vader	Star Wars	Balance of the Force^{EA}	September 22, 2022	Pinball FX2	Ivan "Mad_Boy" Nicoara
Star Wars™ Pinball: The Force Awakens	Star Wars	The Force Awakens^{EA}	September 22, 2022	Pinball FX2	Peter "Deep" Grafl
Star Wars™ Pinball: Might of the First Order	Star Wars	The Force Awakens^{EA}	September 22, 2022	Pinball FX2	Zoltan Vari
Star Wars™ Pinball: Rogue One	Star Wars	Unsung Heroes^{EA}	September 22, 2022	Pinball FX2	Zoltan Vari
Star Wars™ Pinball: Star Wars Rebels	Star Wars	Unsung Heroes^{EA}	September 22, 2022	Pinball FX2	Peter "Deep" Grafl
Star Wars™ Pinball: The Last Jedi	Star Wars	The Last Jedi^{EA}	September 22, 2022	Pinball FX3	Peter "Deep" Grafl
Star Wars™ Pinball: Ahch-To Island	Star Wars	The Last Jedi^{EA}	September 22, 2022	Pinball FX3	David "ndever" Szucs
Star Wars™ Pinball: Solo	Star Wars	Solo^{EA}	September 22, 2022	Pinball FX3	Zoltan Vari
Star Wars™ Pinball: Calrissian Chronicles	Star Wars	Solo^{EA}	September 22, 2022	Pinball FX3	Thomas Crofts
Star Wars™ Pinball: Battle of Mimban	Star Wars	Solo^{EA}	September 22, 2022	Pinball FX3	Peter Horvath
The Mandalorian	Star Wars	Thrill of the Hunt^{EAL}	March 31, 2022	Star Wars Pinball VR	Peter "Deep" Grafl
Classic Collectibles	Star Wars	Thrill of the Hunt^{EAL}	March 31, 2022	Star Wars Pinball VR	Zoltan Vari
Spider-Man	Marvel	Marvel Pinball Original	February 16, 2023	Pinball FX2	Mate Szeplaki
Wolverine	Marvel	Marvel Pinball Original	February 16, 2023	Pinball FX2	Zoltan Vari
Iron Man	Marvel	Marvel Pinball Original	February 16, 2023	Pinball FX2	Ivan "Mad_Boy" Nicoara
Blade	Marvel	Marvel Pinball Original	February 16, 2023	Pinball FX2	Imre "Emeric" Szigeti
Captain America	Marvel	Marvel Legends	February 16, 2023	Pinball FX2	Viktor Gyorei
Doctor Strange	Marvel	Marvel Legends	February 16, 2023	Pinball FX2	Ivan "Mad_Boy" Nicoara
Fantastic Four	Marvel	Marvel Legends	February 16, 2023	Pinball FX2	Peter "Deep" Grafl
Ghost Rider	Marvel	Vengeance and Virtue	February 16, 2023	Pinball FX2	Zoltan Vari
Moon Knight	Marvel	Vengeance and Virtue	February 16, 2023	Pinball FX2	Imre "Emeric" Szigeti
Thor	Marvel	Vengeance and Virtue	February 16, 2023	Pinball FX2	Ivan "Mad_Boy" Nicoara
X-Men	Marvel	Vengeance and Virtue	February 16, 2023	Pinball FX2	Thomas Crofts
Marvel’s Guardians of the Galaxy	Marvel	Cinematic	April 13, 2023	Pinball FX2	Thomas Crofts
Marvel’s Avengers: Age of Ultron	Marvel	Cinematic	April 13, 2023	Pinball FX2	Tamas "Ypok" Pokrocz
Ant-Man	Marvel	Cinematic	April 13, 2023	Pinball FX2	Zoltan Vari
Civil War	Marvel	Heavy Hitters	April 13, 2023	Pinball FX2	Mate Szeplaki
Venom	Marvel	Heavy Hitters	April 13, 2023	Pinball FX2	Zoltan Vari
Deadpool	Marvel	Heavy Hitters	April 13, 2023	Pinball FX2	Tamas "Ypok" Pokrocz
Marvel’s The Avengers	Marvel	Avengers Chronicles	April 13, 2023	Pinball FX2	Thomas Crofts w/ Mate Szeplaki
Fear Itself	Marvel	Avengers Chronicles	April 13, 2023	Pinball FX2	Zoltan Vari
The Infinity Gauntlet	Marvel	Avengers Chronicles	April 13, 2023	Pinball FX2	Peter "Deep" Grafl
World War Hulk	Marvel	Avengers Chronicles	April 13, 2023	Pinball FX2	Ivan "Mad_Boy" Nicoara
Marvel’s Women of Power: A-Force	Marvel	Women of Power	April 13, 2023	Pinball FX2	Thomas Crofts w/ Peter 'Deep' Grafl
Marvel’s Women of Power: Champions	Marvel	Women of Power	April 13, 2023	Pinball FX2	Zoltan Vari
Jurassic Park	Universal	Jurassic World^{EAL}	March 31, 2022	Pinball FX3	Zoltan Vari
Jurassic Park Pinball Mayhem	Universal	Jurassic World^{EAL}	March 31, 2022	Pinball FX3	Peter Horvath
Jurassic World	Universal	Jurassic World^{EAL}	March 31, 2022	Pinball FX3	Thomas Crofts
Back to the Future	Universal	Universal Classics^{EAL}	March 31, 2022	Pinball FX3	Peter "Deep" Grafl
Jaws	Universal	Universal Classics^{EAL}	March 31, 2022	Pinball FX3	David "ndever" Szucs
E.T.	Universal	Universal Classics^{EAL}	March 31, 2022	Pinball FX3	Peter Horvath
World War Z	Paramount	single table^{EA}	April 21, 2022	Pinball FX	Daniel ’Dolby’ Vigh
My Little Pony	Hasbro	single table^{EA}	September 22, 2022	Zen Pinball Party	Thomas Crofts
Trolls	DreamWorks	DreamWorks^{EA}	December 15, 2022	Zen Pinball Party	Anna Lengyel
Kung Fu Panda	DreamWorks	DreamWorks^{EA}	December 15, 2022	Zen Pinball Party	Peter “Pewet” Kovacs
How to Train Your Dragon	DreamWorks	DreamWorks^{EA}	December 15, 2022	Zen Pinball Party	Zoltan Vari
Garfield	Nickelodeon	single table	February 16, 2023	Zen Pinball Party	Thomas Crofts
Homeworld: Journey to Hiigara	Gearbox	Gearbox or single table ^{EA}	August 25, 2022	Pinball FX	Anna Lengyel
Borderlands: Vault Hunter Pinball	Gearbox	Gearbox or single table	February 16, 2023	Pinball FX	Zoltan Vari
Brothers in Arms: Win the War	Gearbox	Gearbox or single table	February 16, 2023	Pinball FX	Thomas Crofts
Peanuts Snoopy	Peanuts	single table^{EA}	December 15, 2022	Zen Pinball Party	Daniel ’Dolby’ Vigh
A Charlie Brown Christmas	Peanuts	single table	December 7, 2023	Pinball FX	Zoltan ’Pazo’ Pataki
Crypt of the NecroDancer	Brace Yourself Games	single table	April 13, 2023	Pinball FX	Gergely ’Gary’ Vadocz
Godzilla	Legendary	Godzilla vs. Kong	April 13, 2023	Pinball FX	Gaspar Viragos
Kong	Legendary	Godzilla vs. Kong	April 13, 2023	Pinball FX	Daniel ’Dolby’ Vigh
Godzilla vs. Kong	Legendary	Godzilla vs. Kong	April 13, 2023	Pinball FX	Thomas Crofts
Super Sweet Pinball	South Park	South Park	October 12, 2023	Pinball FX2	Peter "Deep" Grafl
Butters Very Own Pinball Game	South Park	South Park	October 12, 2023	Pinball FX2	David "ndever" Szucs
Star Trek™ Pinball: Kelvin Timeline	Star Trek	Star Trek Pinball	December 7, 2023	Pinball FX	Zoltan ’Pazo’ Pataki
Star Trek™ Pinball: Discovery	Star Trek	Star Trek Pinball	December 7, 2023	Pinball FX	Gaspar Viragos
Star Trek™ Pinball: Deep Space Nine	Star Trek	Star Trek Pinball	December 7, 2023	Pinball FX	Thomas Crofts
Terraforming Mars	Game Night Pinball	Game Night Pinball volume 1	December 7, 2023	Pinball FX	Daniel ’Dolby’ Vigh
Gloomhaven	Game Night Pinball	Game Night Pinball volume 1	December 7, 2023	Pinball FX	Thomas Crofts
Exploding Kittens	Game Night Pinball	Game Night Pinball volume 1	December 7, 2023	Pinball FX	Eniko 'Doe' Mihalyi
System Shock	Wild Cards	single table	February 15, 2024	Pinball M/FX	Zoltan Vari
DOOM	Bethesda	Bethesda Pinball	February 12, 2026	Pinball FX2	David "ndever" Szucs
Fallout	Bethesda	Bethesda Pinball	February 12, 2026	Pinball FX2	Peter Horvath
The Elder Scrolls V: Skyrim	Bethesda	Bethesda Pinball	February 12, 2026	Pinball FX2	Peter "Deep" Grafl
Pacific Rim	Legendary	single table	May 16, 2024	Pinball FX	Gergely ’Gary’ Vadocz
Knight Rider	Universal	Universal Pinball: TV Classics	May 16, 2024	Pinball FX	Peter "Deep" Grafl
Battlestar Galactica	Universal	Universal Pinball: TV Classics	May 16, 2024	Pinball FX	Andras 'Babar' Klujber
Xena: Warrior Princess	Universal	Universal Pinball: TV Classics	May 16, 2024	Pinball FX	Anna Lengyel
Goat Simulator	Wild Cards	single table	August 29, 2024	Pinball FX	Thomas Crofts
The Princess Bride	Wild Cards	single table	August 29, 2024	Pinball FX	Daniel ’Dolby’ Vigh & Andras 'Babar' Klujber
Adventures of Lara Croft	Wild Cards	Tomb Raider Pinball	June 19, 2025	Pinball FX/FX VR/AtGames/mobile	Thomas Crofts
Secrets of Croft Manor	Wild Cards	Tomb Raider Pinball	June 19, 2025	Pinball FX/FX VR/AtGames/mobile	Daniel ’Dolby’ Vigh

"Pack" refers to the table pack on Steam; some remastered tables are included in larger collections on other platforms. Zen Originals are tables created by Zen Studios without third-party IP. Williams tables are digital recreations of physical tables by Williams/Bally, some of which include additional third-party licenses. Wild Cards are standalone tables based on individual IPs, grouped into a general category.

^slfThis table originally featured the licensed teams Liverpool F.C., Arsenal F.C., Real Madrid C.F., FC Barcelona, Juventus, A.S. Roma, and A.C. Milan. But for this release the licensed teams have been removed.

== Pinball FX VR table list ==
Beginning with Tomb Raider pinball in June 2025 new pinball releases were simultaneously released in Pinball FX and Pinball FX VR; see the above table for these.

Table(s)	License	Pack	Pinball FX VR release date	Zen Table Designer
Curse of the Mummy	Zen Originals	base game	April 3, 2025	Anna Lengyel w/ Peter "Deep" Grafl
Pinball Noir	Zen Originals	base game	April 3, 2025	Zoltan Vari
Sky Pirates: Treasures of the Clouds	Zen Originals	base game	April 3, 2025	Peter “Pewet” Kovacs
The Addams Family	Williams	single table	April 3, 2025	Zoltan ’Pazo’ Pataki
Indiana Jones: The Pinball Adventure	Williams	single table	April 3, 2025	Zoltan Vari
Star Trek: The Next Generation	Williams	single table	April 3, 2025	Zoltan Vari
Twilight Zone	Williams	single table	April 3, 2025	Thomas Crofts w/ Anna Lengyel
World Cup Soccer (Delisted on May 1, 2026)	Williams	single table	April 3, 2025	Zoltan ’Pazo’ Pataki
Medieval Madness	Williams	Volume 1	May 15, 2025	Peter "Deep" Grafl
The Getaway: High Speed II	Williams	Volume 1	May 15, 2025	Peter "Deep" Grafl
Junk Yard	Williams	Volume 1	May 15, 2025	Peter "Deep" Grafl
Attack from Mars	Williams	Volume 2	May 15, 2025	Thomas Crofts
The Party Zone	Williams	Volume 2	May 15, 2025	Zoltan Vari
Black Rose	Williams	Volume 2	May 15, 2025	Peter Horvath
Theatre of Magic	Williams	Volume 3	May 15, 2025	Peter "Deep" Grafl
The Champion Pub	Williams	Volume 3	May 15, 2025	Peter "Deep" Grafl
Safe Cracker	Williams	Volume 3	May 15, 2025	Thomas Crofts
Pin-Bot, Taxi, Who Dunnit	Williams	Volume 9	August 14, 2025	
Elvira and the Party Monsters, Scared Stiff	Williams	single tables	October 16, 2015	
Diner, Comet, Fire!	Williams	Volume 10	April 30, 2026	
Monster Bash, Creature from the Black Lagoon	Williams	Universal Monsters	December 4, 2025	
Judge Dredd	Williams	single table	October 22, 2026	
Knight Rider	Universal	Universal Pinball: TV Classics	April 3, 2025	Peter "Deep" Grafl
Battlestar Galactica	Universal	Universal Pinball: TV Classics	April 3, 2025	Andras 'Babar' Klujber
Xena: Warrior Princess	Universal	Universal Pinball: TV Classics	April 3, 2025	Anna Lengyel
Adventures of Lara Croft, Secrets of Croft Manor		Tomb Raider Pinball	June 19, 2025	
A Charlie Brown Christmas	Peanuts	single table	December 4, 2025	
Godzilla, Kong, Godzilla vs. Kong	Legendary	Godzilla vs. Kong	December 4, 2025	
DOOM, Fallout, The Elder Scrolls V: Skyrim	Bethesda	Bethesda Pinball	February 12, 2026	
Pacific Rim	Legendary	single table	July 9, 2026	
Goat Simulator		single table	July 9, 2026	
The Princess Bride		single table	July 9, 2026	

== AtGames FX Legends 4KP table list ==
The below list features only the 4KP pinball tables that specifically relate to Zen Studios. Other pinball packs are available.

Beginning with Tomb Raider pinball in June 2025 new pinball releases were simultaneously released in Pinball FX and for AtGames, see the first table for these.

Table	License/Category	Pack	AtGames release date	Zen Table Designer
Attack from Mars	Williams	Williams™ Pinball: Attack from Mars™	April 8, 2024	Thomas Crofts
Monster Bash	Williams	Williams™ Pinball: Universal Monsters Legends Mini Pack	October 2, 2024	Peter "Deep" Grafl
Creature from the Black Lagoon	Williams	Williams™ Pinball: Universal Monsters Legends Mini Pack	October 2, 2024	Zoltan Vari
Fish Tales	Williams	Williams™ Pinball: Fish Tales™	December 11, 2024	Peter "Deep" Grafl
The Addams Family	Williams	Williams™ Pinball The Addams Family™ Legends Single Premium Pack	March 26, 2024	Zoltan ’Pazo’ Pataki
Star Trek: The Next Generation	Williams	Williams™ Pinball Star Trek™: The Next Generation	April 3, 2024	Zoltan Vari
Twilight Zone	Williams	Williams™ Pinball: The Twilight Zone	May 22, 2024	Thomas Crofts w/ Anna Lengyel
World Cup Soccer (Delisted on May 1, 2026)	Williams	Williams™ Pinball: World Cup Soccer Legends Single Premium Pack	May 29, 2024	Zoltan ’Pazo’ Pataki
Black Rose	Williams	Williams™ Pinball: Black Rose™	February 19, 2025	Peter Horvath
Medieval Madness	Williams	Williams™ Pinball Volume 1 Legends Mini Pack	March 19, 2025	Peter "Deep" Grafl
The Getaway: High Speed II	Williams	Williams™ Pinball Volume 1 Legends Mini Pack	March 19, 2025	Peter "Deep" Grafl
Junk Yard	Williams	Williams™ Pinball Volume 1 Legends Mini Pack	March 19, 2025	Peter "Deep" Grafl
Sorcerer's Lair	Zen Originals	Sorcerer's Lair Legends Single Pack	December 23, 2024	Viktor Gyorei
Wild West Rampage	Zen Originals	Wild West Rampage Legends Single Pack	December 23, 2024	David "ndever" Szucs
Jurassic Park	Universal	Jurassic World Pinball Legends Mini Pack	October 10, 2024	Zoltan Vari
Jurassic Park Pinball Mayhem	Universal	Jurassic World Pinball Legends Mini Pack	October 10, 2024	Peter Horvath
Jurassic World	Universal	Jurassic World Pinball Legends Mini Pack	October 10, 2024	Thomas Crofts
Back to the Future	Universal	Universal Classics Pinball™ Legends Mini Pack	October 30, 2024	Peter "Deep" Grafl
Jaws	Universal	Universal Classics Pinball™ Legends Mini Pack	October 30, 2024	David "ndever" Szucs
E.T.	Universal	Universal Classics Pinball™ Legends Mini Pack	October 30, 2024	Peter Horvath
My Little Pony	Hasbro	MY LITTLE PONY Pinball	July 17, 2024	Thomas Crofts
Trolls	DreamWorks	DreamWorks Pinball Legends Mini Pack	June 5, 2024	Anna Lengyel
Kung Fu Panda	DreamWorks	DreamWorks Pinball Legends Mini Pack	June 5, 2024	Peter “Pewet” Kovacs
How to Train Your Dragon	DreamWorks	DreamWorks Pinball Legends Mini Pack	June 5, 2024	Zoltan Vari
Garfield	Nickelodeon	Garfield Pinball Legends Single Pack	July 24, 2024	Thomas Crofts
Homeworld: Journey to Hiigara	Gearbox	Gearbox® Pinball Legends Mini Pack	October 3, 2024	Anna Lengyel
Borderlands: Vault Hunter Pinball	Gearbox	Gearbox® Pinball Legends Mini Pack	October 3, 2024	Zoltan Vari
Brothers in Arms: Win the War	Gearbox	Gearbox® Pinball Legends Mini Pack	October 3, 2024	Thomas Crofts
Peanuts Snoopy	Peanuts	Peanuts Snoopy Pinball Legends Single Pack	September 19, 2024	Daniel ’Dolby’ Vigh
A Charlie Brown Christmas	Peanuts	A Charlie Brown Christmas™ Pinball	December 4, 2024	Zoltan ’Pazo’ Pataki
Godzilla	Legendary	Godzilla vs. Kong Pinball Pack Legends Mini Pack	October 10, 2024	Gaspar Viragos
Kong	Legendary	Godzilla vs. Kong Pinball Pack Legends Mini Pack	October 10, 2024	Daniel ’Dolby’ Vigh
Godzilla vs. Kong	Legendary	Godzilla vs. Kong Pinball Pack Legends Mini Pack	October 10, 2024	Thomas Crofts
Super Sweet Pinball	South Park	South Park™ Pinball Legends Mini Pack	November 20, 2024	Peter "Deep" Grafl
Butters Very Own Pinball Game	South Park	South Park™ Pinball Legends Mini Pack	November 20, 2024	David "ndever" Szucs
Star Trek™ Pinball: Kelvin Timeline	Star Trek	Star Trek™ Pinball Legends Mini Pack	September 19, 2024	Zoltan ’Pazo’ Pataki
Star Trek™ Pinball: Discovery	Star Trek	Star Trek™ Pinball Legends Mini Pack	September 19, 2024	Gaspar Viragos
Star Trek™ Pinball: Deep Space Nine	Star Trek	Star Trek™ Pinball Legends Mini Pack	September 19, 2024	Thomas Crofts
The Thing	Universal Pictures	The Thing Pinball Legends Single Pack	October 16, 2024	Daniel 'Dolby' Vigh
Chucky's Killer Pinball	Universal Pictures	Chucky's Killer Pinball Legends Single Pack	October 23, 2024	Zoltan 'VZ' Vari
Knight Rider	Universal	Universal Classics Pinball™ Legends Mini Pack	October 30, 2024	Peter "Deep" Grafl
Battlestar Galactica	Universal	Universal Classics Pinball™ Legends Mini Pack	October 30, 2024	Andras 'Babar' Klujber
Xena: Warrior Princess	Universal	Universal Classics Pinball™ Legends Mini Pack	October 30, 2024	Anna Lengyel
