= Northwest Pinball and Arcade Show =

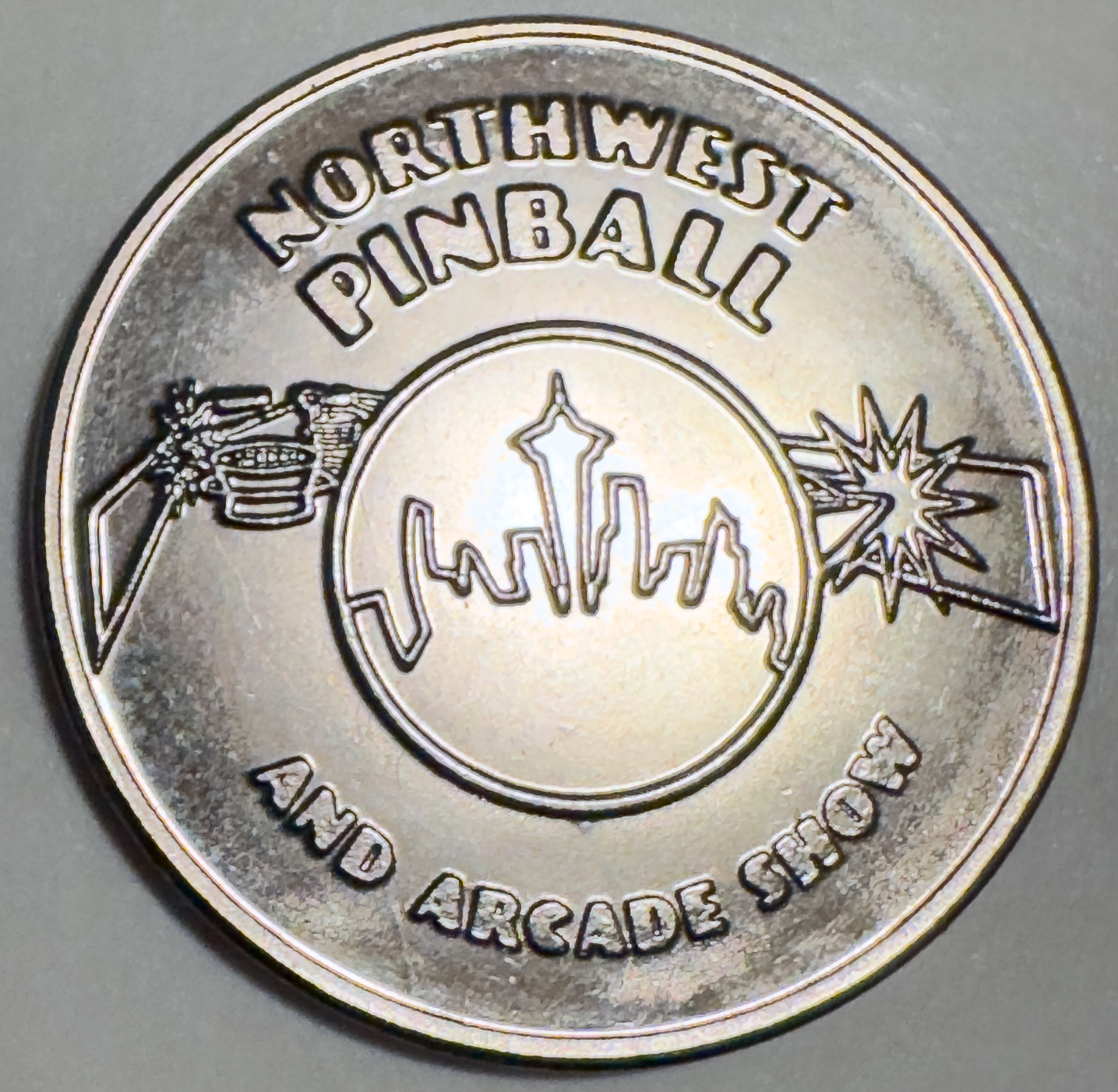
- 10 year commemorative token
- Status: Active
- Genre: Gaming
- Venue: Greater Tacoma Convention Center
- Locations: Tacoma, Washington
- Country: USA
- Inaugurated: 2008
- Attendance: 3,000
- Organizer: Northwest Pinball and Arcade Show
- Website: http://www.nwpinballshow.com

The Northwest Pinball and Arcade Show is an annual pinball and arcade game festival held in Tacoma, Washington, United States.

The Northwest Pinball and Arcade Show draws around 3,000 collectors and fans each June to the Seattle area. The festival began as a small annual event held by Washington pinball collectors, but in 2008 became a full-fledged regional convention featuring 125 pinball machines, arcade games, electro-mechanical games, with speakers, vendors and tournaments. In 2013 the show expanded in size, prompting a move from the Seattle Center to the Greater Tacoma Convention Center.

== 2025 ==
The 18th annual Northwest Pinball and Arcade Show took place at the Greater Tacoma Convention Center from June 6–8, 2025. There were over 400-500 playable machines.

== 2024 ==
The 17th annual Northwest Pinball and Arcade Show took place at the Greater Tacoma Convention Center from June 7–9, 2024. There were over 400 playable machines.

== 2023 ==
The 16th annual Northwest Pinball and Arcade Show took place at the Greater Tacoma Convention Center from June 2–4, 2023. There were over 400 playable machines.

== 2022 ==
The 15th annual Northwest Pinball and Arcade Show took place at the Greater Tacoma Convention Center from June 3–5, 2022. There were over 400 playable machines.

== 2021 ==
Due to the ongoing COVID-19 pandemic, the Northwest Pinball and Arcade Show was cancelled. The action was specifically taken "...with the current ban on large events at this point in the pandemic, the Greater Tacoma Convention Center remains closed to public events.”

== 2020 ==
Due to the COVID-19 pandemic, the Northwest Pinball and Arcade Show was cancelled. The decision to cancel the show came two months before it was originally scheduled. The action was specifically taken "in the interest of public health safety.”

== 2019 ==
The 12th annual Northwest Pinball and Arcade Show took place at the Greater Tacoma Convention Center from May 31, 2019 – June 2, 2019. There were over 400 playable machines.

== 2018 ==
The 11th annual Northwest Pinball and Arcade Show took place at the Greater Tacoma Convention Center from June 8–10, 2018. There were over 400 games that were free to play. Seminars were held by Dave Okert, Victor Tan, and others.

== 2017 ==
The 10th annual Northwest Pinball and Arcade Show took place at the Greater Tacoma Convention Center from June 9–11, 2017. There were 218 playable machines, 192 of them being free to play on the show floor. Several seminars were held, given by Mark Ritchie, John Youssi, Greg Freres, and others.

== 2016 ==
The 9th annual Northwest Pinball and Arcade Show took place at the Greater Tacoma Convention Center from June 3–5, 2016. There were 215 playable pinball machines, 185 of them being free to play on the show floor. Several seminars were held, given by Nolan Bushnell, David Theil, and others.

== 2015 ==
The 8th annual Northwest Pinball and Arcade Show took place at the Greater Tacoma Convention Center from June 5–7, 2015.

== 2014 ==
The 7th annual Northwest Pinball and Arcade Show took place at the Greater Tacoma Convention Center from June 6–8, 2014.

== 2013 ==
The 6th annual Northwest Pinball and Arcade Show took place at the Greater Tacoma Convention Center from June 7–9, 2013. The new venue was larger and accommodated more games, more vendors, more exhibits and more people. Pinball designer and artist Python Anghelo came to the show for the first time and hosted an engaging fireside chat, moderated by pinball historian and collector Gary Flower, as well as doing a seminar later on "The Future of Pinball." Angelo's game credits include arcade games Joust (video game) and Sinistar, as well as dozens of pinball machines including PIN•BOT, Taxi, Cyclone, Bad Cats, Fish Tales, The Machine: Bride of Pin-Bot, Police Force, High Speed and Comet. Kevin Kulek and Aaron Klumpp of Skit B Pinball brought out their new Predator pinball machine to talk about it, both it and their one of a kind Duck Hunt pinball machine were available to play throughout the weekend on the show floor. Gerry Stellenberg, owner of Multimorphic, spoke about the new P3 Pinball and P-ROC. Pinball artist Kevin O'Connor designed the 2013 show poster and spoke about his experience in the industry, O'Connor's game credits include Monster Bash, Kiss, Creature From The Black Lagoon and many more. Jersey Jack Pinball's Butch Peel did a seminar on the "Making The Wizard Of Oz Pinball" and brought a finished The Wizard of Oz for everyone to play during the show. Longtime Washington State game operator Bill Masterman spoke about operating games on location and arcade high score sensations Todd Rogers and Steve Wiebe, star of "The King Of Kong" movie, also spoke. There was a premiere for the movie "The Space Invaders: In Search of Lost Time" with a Q&A with director Jeff Von Ward and locals Aaron Davis and Barry Shilmover gave a talk on "Turning Your Pinball Design Ideas Into A Real Machine!" and their new pinball company Skillshot. Gary Stern, owner and president of Stern Pinball gave a seminar and drew the winning raffle ticket at the end in which someone took home a new X-Men Pro pinball game. For the first year NW Pinball and Arcade Show trophies were presented and the show awarded a number of scholarships to local college students going into game design related fields.

== 2012 ==
The 5th annual Northwest Pinball and Arcade Show drew 3,000 visitors to the Seattle Center from June 8–10, 2012. The show featured "Jersey Jack" Guarnieri speaking about the making The Wizard Of Oz Pinball, as well as the first public peak at a prototype of the game. Gary Stern of Stern Pinball talked about his history in the pinball industry. UK pinball author Gary Flower talked about his history with pinball. Rich Lint from This Old Game did a talk about replacing the artwork on arcade and pinball machines. Pinball designer Steve Ritchie (AC/DC, Spider-Man, Terminator 2, Black Knight, High Speed, Star Trek: The Next Generation) talked about his experience in pinball design. Pinball artist Doug Watson (Attack From Mars, Indiana Jones, The Shadow, Terminator 2, F-14, Black Knight 2000) spoke about his experiences as a pinball artist. John Popadiuk (Circus Voltaire, World Cup Soccer, Tales Of The Arabian Nights, Theatre Of Magic) spoke about his history with pinball design. Eugene Jarvis, video game and pinball designer and programmer (Robotron: 2084, Defender, Firepower, Narc, Smash TV, Gorgar, Cruis'n) gave a talk about his experience and history in the industry. Rick Bartlett, owner Planetary Pinball talked about new pinball parts. Lindsey Rupertus spoke on the basics of solid state pinball repair methodology. Twin Galaxies was on hand to judge world record high score attempts and presented their Trading Card Expo. There were also panel discussions on game collecting and repair seminars. The NW Pinball and Arcade Show Pinball Tournament drew top players from around the world and the Seattle Pinball Museum put on a series for more casual, fun and family oriented pinball tournaments throughout the weekend. One lucky winner per day won a pinball or arcade game, prizes this year included a Wizard of Oz, Centipede, Galaga and Terminator 2 pinball machine. There is a great recap of the 2012 show with photos on Pinball News.

== 2011 ==
The 4th annual Northwest Pinball and Arcade Show took place at the Seattle Center from June 3–5, 2011. Guest speakers included: pinball artwork designer John Youssi (The Addams Family, Funhouse, Twilight Zone, Whirlwind, Red & Ted's Road Show, No Good Gofers, Medieval Madness, The Machine: Bride of Pin*Bot), Steve Wiebe from the movie The King of Kong: A Fistful of Quarters, Walter Day (founder of Twin Galaxies, the International Video Game Hall of Fame and star of the movie Chasing Ghosts: Beyond the Arcade), and pinball designer John Popadiuk (Cirqus Voltaire, Star Wars Episode I, Theatre of Magic, Tales Of The Arabian Nights, World Cup Soccer). Special guests included pinball and arcade designer Steve Ritchie (Firepower, Black Knight, Terminator 2: Judgment Day, Star Trek: The Next Generation, World Poker Tour, Spider-Man), ex-NBA player Todd MacCulloch and arcade and pinball sound designer David Thiel (Q*bert, The Three Stooges, Family Guy, Pirates of the Caribbean). The show also featured world record attempts and the IFPA (International Flipper Pinball Association) sanctioned "Northwest Pinball Championships" tournament, drawing top pinball competitors from around the world.

== 2010 ==
The 3rd annual Northwest Pinball and Arcade Show took place at the Seattle Center from June 11–13, 2010 and featured 260 pinball and arcade games. Guest speakers included Steve Wiebe from the movie The King of Kong: A Fistful of Quarters, pinball and arcade designer George Gomez (Satan's Hollow, Tron, Spy Hunter, Johnny Mnemonic, Monster Bash, Revenge From Mars, The Lord of the Rings, Batman), arcade and pinball sound designer David Thiel (Q*bert, The Three Stooges, Family Guy, Pirates of the Caribbean), and pinball designer John Trudeau (Creature from the Black Lagoon, The Machine: Bride of Pin*Bot, Judge Dredd, Black Rose, The Flintstones, Congo). Show featured IFPA (International Flipper Pinball Association) sanctioned "Northwest Pinball Championships," drawing top pinball competitors from around the world.

Nine world record high scores were set at the 2010 show:

Video arcade games:

- Lunar Lander – 1,705 by Dan Whitmarsh
- Mario Bros. – 418,870 by John Bartkiw and Ross Benziger (No POW Challenge, 2-Player Team, Twin Galaxies Tournament Settings)
- Metal Slug X – 1,286,660 by Jordan Vick
- Popeye – 1,238,110 by Perry Rodgers
- Punch-Out!! – 18,999,970 by Sean Sandnes

Pinball games -

- 24 – 94,596,880 by Zach Sharpe
- Centigrade 37 – 371,850 by Keith Elwin
- Firepower – 1,154,600 by Keith Elwin
- Four Million BC – 37,900 by Neil Shatz

== 2009 ==
The 2nd annual show at the Seattle Center was held June 12–14, 2009. The show was expanded with the addition of a second room filled with classic arcade video games, and the combined total of arcade and pinball machines reached 250. Guest speakers included game designer Dennis Nordman (Scared Stiff, White Water, Demolition Man, Pirates of the Caribbean, Wheel of Fortune), game artist and sound creator Greg Freres (Medieval Madness, Star Trek: The Next Generation, Revenge from Mars, Scared Stiff), music and sound designer Brian Schmidt, star of the documentary movie High Score, Bill Carlton, and Clay Harrell from This Old Pinball. Steve Wiebe returned, but instead of speaking, he made his 6th public attempt to reclaim the world high score on Donkey Kong. David Nelson from Twin Galaxies was on hand to referee Wiebe's high score attempt and watch many other world record high score attempts, as was Mark Alpiger from ClassicArcadeGaming.com. Walter Day hosted a press conference to present the International Video Game Hall of Fame's inaugural ceremony with 12 world record high score holders.

Seventeen world record high scores were set at the 2009 show:

Video arcade games:

- Kicker – 1,958,000 by Chris Mansfield (Twin Galaxies Extreme Settings)
- Vs. Excitebike – 3,205,205 by Jesse Corrington

Pinball games:

- 2001 – 12,617 by Shane Pace
- 4 Square – 6,591 by Logan Johnson
- Bank-A-Ball – 1,673 by Brian Cady
- Big Casino – 1,993 by Warren Eng
- Domino – 7,910 by Rick Espe
- Flip-A-Card – 8,933 by Warren Eng
- Flying Carpet – 8,437 by Steve Fein
- Grand Prix – 1,060,300 by Eden Stamm
- Jacks Open – 209,180 by Zach Sharpe
- Joust – 79,432 by Tim Hansen
- King Kool – 102,610 by Trevor McDonald
- King Pin – 81,040 by Steve Fein
- Shrek – 53,204,390 by Neil Shatz
- Sky-Line – 1,295 by Shirley Cady
- Theatre of Magic – 7,323,064,830 by Neil Shatz

== 2008 ==
The show's first year at the Seattle Center was held June 6–8, 2008, featured 125 games, and drew 1200 attendees. Steve Wiebe from the movie The King of Kong: A Fistful of Quarters spoke about his experience competing against Billy Mitchell for the world high score on Donkey Kong, which was documented in the movie. Wiebe also demonstrated on a Donkey Kong arcade game some of his moves for scoring higher points and how to navigate harder levels. Other guest speakers included pinball and arcade designer Steve Ritchie (Firepower, Black Knight, Terminator 2: Judgment Day, Star Trek: The Next Generation, World Poker Tour, Spider-Man), pinball software programmer Greg Dunlap (Monopoly, RollerCoaster Tycoon), electro-mechanical pinball restorer Tim Meighan, and arcade and pinball sound designer David Thiel (Q*bert, The Three Stooges, Family Guy, Pirates of the Caribbean).
