= Kiss merchandising =

Products with branding of American band Kiss

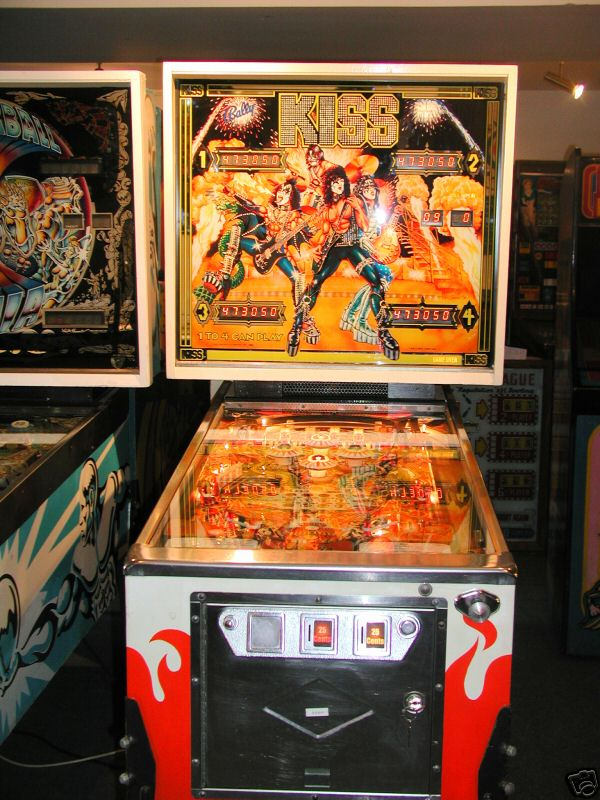
The German Kiss pinball machine.

The American rock band Kiss has licensed a large amount of merchandising throughout their career. According to Sandra O'Loughlin in an article for Brandweek magazine, "Kiss has licensed its name to more than 3,000 product categories, from lunch boxes and comic books to credit cards and condoms to become nearly a one-billion-dollar brand."

Kiss have more pieces of merchandise and have generated more money from merchandise, than any other artist in the history of music. Bassist and co-founder Gene Simmons, who has been the most aggressive and ambitious member of the band in seeking merchandising deals, has voiced disregard for the portions of his fan base who disapprove of such merchandising. In his book Sex Money Kiss, he states: "I think it's cool to see my face on a lunchbox. It's fun. I'm doing this for me. You don't have to buy one."

The list of Kiss-related products is not comprehensive, but this article lists the most notable in terms of success and scope.

== In print ==
=== Comic books ===
In 1977 Marvel Comics published a magazine-format full-color comic book presenting the band as superheroes. Blood from each band member was drawn by a registered nurse, witnessed by a notary public, and poured into the vats of red ink used for printing the comic at Marvel's Borden Ink plant in Depew, New York. Marvel also published a second Kiss comic magazine in 1978, with much less fanfare. In 1997, Image comics began publishing Todd McFarlane's Kiss: Psycho Circus, a much darker and mystical series than the previous Kiss comics. 31 issues were published between 1997 and 2000. In 2002, Dark Horse comics published a Kiss comic book authored by X-Men writer Joe Casey, which lasted for thirteen issues and ended production in 2004. On January 30, 2007, it was announced that the KISS Comics Group, a joint venture between Platinum Studios and the band, would launch a new comic, "KISS 4K", with an oversized $50 Destroyer Edition, at the Wizard World Los Angeles Convention in March and with an ongoing series to follow in May by writer Ricky Sprague and artist Kevin Crossley. "KISS 4K" ran for six issues and one special edition issue in 2008. In 2011 Kiss teamed up with popular comic series Archie for a four-part series, Archie Meets Kiss. In 2012 IDW Publishing signed a deal with the Kiss comics group and have begun printing a new Kiss comic series.

== Toys ==
=== Action figures ===
In 1978 the superhero toy company Mego released a line of action figures of each band member. Two variants of this series exist. The first series was released with stock-standard "skinny" bodies, while the second series was produced with muscular, more superhero-like, physiques. Starting in 1997 and continuing to the present day, McFarlane Toys has manufactured several different series of action figures and figurines, ranging from the exaggeratedly demonic Kiss: Psycho Circus series of figures to the more realistic and representative "Alive!" series, depicting the band performing in their 1975 costumes. The Figures Toys company began to produce a new series of figurines in 2012. The first edition series was based upon the original Mego range, and three more series’ have been planned based around the Sonic Boom, Dressed to Kill and debut self-titled album.

== Lifestyle ==
=== Zippo lighters ===
In the 1990s a set of four Zippo lighters was released, each featuring a cover image from the band's 1978 solo albums.

=== Kiss Kasket ===
From 2001 to 2006, Kiss offered for sale a custom-made coffin emblazoned with imagery of the band for $4500. On the Howard Stern radio show, Gene Simmons said of the casket, "This is the ultimate Kiss collectible. I love livin’, but this makes the alternative look pretty damn good." Notable people to be buried in a Kiss Kasket include Pantera guitarist Dimebag Darrell and drummer Vinnie Paul.

=== Condoms ===
In 2002 a line of Kiss condoms (entitled "Kiss Kondoms") entered the market, in varieties such as "Love Gun Protection", "Tongue Lubricated", and "Studded Paul".

=== Kiss Him/Kiss Her ===
In February 2006, the band licensed a new product line of beauty, shampoo and fragrance products entitled "Kiss Him" (for men) and "Kiss Her" (for women). The Kiss Him" line includes cologne, shampoo/body wash, deodorant, body spray and shaving cream. The "Kiss Her" line features perfume, body lotion, shower gel, and bath splash. Both are marketed by Gemini Cosmetics.

=== Memorial products ===
On December 1, 2010, Kissonline.com announced a new licensing agreement between Kiss and Eternal Image Inc. (a public company engaged in the design, manufacturing, and marketing of officially licensed memorial products) to design, manufacture, and market a limited edition line of official Kiss branded memorial products. In addition to caskets (see Kiss Kasket above), the line will include cremation urns, bronze memorials, memorial prayer cards, registry books, memorial candles, and pet cremation urns.

=== Platinum Visa Card ===
FirstUSA bank offers a Kiss Platinum Visa card. According to their promotional material, cardholders "receive monthly updates, news and inside gossip straight from the veteran shock rockers". As of 2012 the new Kiss Army Visa Platinum Rewards Card, is available through Visa and the Kissonline store. The new card comes in five different designs.

== Games ==
=== Pinball ===
In 1978 the first Kiss arcade pinball machine was introduced by Bally, and stayed in circulation well into the 1980s. In 2000, a Kiss Pinball game was released for the PC, with a PlayStation port the following year. In September 2006 it was announced that a new coin-op machine was in the works from Kiss licensee ICUP. On May 6, 2015, Stern Pinball announced the release of three new versions of a Kiss pinball machine. The machine features the artist who worked on the original Bally pinball machine, Kevin O'Connor.

=== Board games ===
The "Kiss On Tour" board game was offered in stores in 1978. In 2003 a Kiss-themed variation of Monopoly was released as Kiss-opoly. In 2006 a card game called "Got to Choose" appeared on the market.

=== Video games ===
Kiss: Psycho Circus: The Nightmare Child was released for PC and Dreamcast in 2000, while Kiss Pinball for the PC and PlayStation was released in 2000 and 2001 respectively.

=== Trading cards ===
Over the years there have been a number of Trading cards series released beginning with the original series in 1978 by Donruss. Since then there have been releases in the nineties and 2000s as well.

- 1978 Donruss Series 1
- 1978 Donruss Series 2
- 1980 Donruss Series (re-release of the 1978 series 1 exclusively in Australia for the 1980 Unmasked tour)
- 1997 Cornerstone Series 1
- 1998 Cornerstone Series 2
- 2001 NECA Alive! series
- 2008 Presspass Ikons series
- 2009 Presspass 360 degrees series
- 2010 Presspass Legends series

== Audio/visual ==
=== Kiss radio ===
The Kiss AM transistor radio was released in 1977. In present day, it is a sought after collectible item of Kiss merchandising.

=== Phonograph ===
Released by Tiger in 1978, the Kiss record player could only play 7-inch singles and was originally sold for around US$16. It is embellished with the solo photos from the cover of Alive II. Along with the transistor radio, it has become one of the most sought after items for Kiss collectors.

=== Toy guitar ===
There were two versions of the Kiss guitar, one packaged by itself from 1977 and one packaged with the Kiss microphone and amplifier, from 1978.

== Kiss Koffeehouse ==
A specialty coffee retailer operating in Myrtle Beach, South Carolina, with other outlets in the planning stages. The diner sells Kiss-brand coffee, food, thermoses, mugs, and other products.
