= Future Pinball =

3D pinball editing and gaming freeware

- Developers: Christopher Leathley (core app), Rafal Janicki (BAM)
- Stable release: FP 1.9.1.20101231 + BAM v.1.5-365 / June 17, 2023; 3 years ago
- Operating system: Microsoft Windows
- Type: Pinball
- License: Freeware
- Website: www.futurepinball.com (Core FP) www.ravarcade.pl (BAM continuation)

Future Pinball ("FP") is a freeware 3D pinball editing and gaming application for Microsoft Windows. It is similar to Visual Pinball ("VP") and other modern pinball simulation applications. Just as with VP's partnership with Visual PinMAME, FP uses partner applications to emulate original pinball ROM code. In FP's case, the end results of ROM code are simulated by Better Arcade Mode ("BAM") and tools such as "Pinball Browser" and dot-matrix display software plugins. Core FP development was discontinued in 2010, but resumed in 2013 via BAM. BAM features many new developments, such as enhanced physics, optics, and virtual reality support.

== Design ==
Future Pinball is a simulator and editor which indirectly emulates hardware found in physical pinball machines. Tables are designed using 3D models found within the editor, and rendered using a 3D real-time engine. Pinball table layout, graphic design, and audio are provided by users during the construction and development of table design.

Future Pinball allows users to create original tables based upon a default table which only contains flippers, slingshots, shooter lane, and shooter. Additional playfield components are added from a library containing surface, guide, objects, rubber, targets, lights, triggers, ramps, and displays. User-created artwork can be added to the playfield, plastics, and backglass translite. Game coding is required, and is accomplished through Microsoft Visual Basic Scripting (VBS) via an embedded script editor. The core FP program uses Newton Game Dynamics for physics.

With the introduction of BAM and discrete plug-n-play code (such as "FizX", "Dynamic Flippers" and "Shiva Flippers") any of which can easily be dropped in to table scripts, the general physics and flipper-specific physics have since been greatly improved. BAM also adds many new features, such as dynamic light settings, enhanced camera settings, post-processing effects, a plug-in system, custom game rooms, balls, and animated mini-playfields. The mini-playfields allow for creation of a wide variety of games unrelated to pinball, such as billiards and BRIO's Labyrinth (marble game).

Several game magazines published tutorials on how to build one's own tables, such as PCWorld, PC Format and c't.

"Starter tables" can also greatly aid the process, such as the powerful fpxEngine, specifically designed for non-coders.

== Playing ==
Future Pinball completed tables can be downloaded and played in the same application. Standard computer keyboards are often used, although there is a growing number of custom pinball cabinet designs that interface buttons to the software.

== History ==
Future Pinball 1.0 was first released to the public on October 22, 2005, by creator and programmer Christopher Leathley after 20 months of development.

In July 2008, NanoTech Entertainment entered into an agreement with Future Pinball to incorporate Future Pinball into a commercial product called MultiPin.

The core FP application reached its final version in December 2010, and BAM picked up development in March 2013. BAM continues to be developed through 2023.

== See also ==
- Visual Pinball
- The Pinball Arcade
