= UltraPin =

2006 pinball machine

- advertising flyer
- Manufacturer: GlobalVR
- Release date: 2006
- Design: Brian Matthews
- Programming: Aaron Hightower, Jason Powell, and Rolle Cruz
- Artwork: Mike McMahon and Chris Hinton

UltraPin is a Multi-Game pinball arcade game that holds 12 digital recreations of Williams Electronics real pinball games in a single pinball cabinet. UltraPin is built in a traditional style pinball cabinet to look and feel like a real pinball machine. It has two LCD screens, a 19 inch LCD for the back glass and DMD, and a 32 inch LCD for the playfield, and it uses Windows XP Embedded for its operating system. Designed for commercial use, it required a game specific dongle attached to the internal computer to work, and used a standard coin mechanism.

== History ==
David R. Foley had the original idea for UltraPin and began research on the idea in the beginning of 2000. In 2004 he discovered a motion controller chip that enabled the idea of a player being able to nudge and bump the ball in play which is unique to any digital pinball game before its time. In 2005 Foley began development on the UltraPin project with Aaron Hightower under David´s company UltraCade Technologies. The development team at UltraCade Technologies created a patch for the existing Visual Pinball engine to use a new custom Physics Engine created by Buen Diseno and some new rendering features, based on DirectX 7. UltraPin also used a customized version of Visual PinMAME to emulate the hardware of various pinball games.

In 2006 UltraCade Technologies was sold to Global VR and the UltraPin project continued development under Global VR. A new development team was assigned to the UltraPin project along with a new producer Brian Matthews. Matthews used the original software from UltraCade Technologies and lead his team to fine tune the physics engine and game play to adhere to the strict game play standards set forth by Roger Sharpe of Williams Electronics pinball division. Williams Electronics had final approval of the UltraPin project and how each of the games played in UltraPin before the game could be sold. In 2007 UltraPin was approved by Williams Electronics to be sold to the public. HyperSpin later released an emulation frontend for the UltraPin named HyperPin. In 2010, the source code of this updated Visual Pinball version (by then 9.0.7) was released under a license that allows free use for non-commercial purposes.

== Post launch ==
On June 4, 2007 Global VR announced that they will offer UltraPin Video Pinball at a significantly lower price. Additionally, the base unit included twelve of the most highly recognizable pinball games, as opposed to six previously. This 12 game package included a flipper feedback board. This consisted of one printed circuitboard and wires to connect to the main flipper buttons. The flipper feedback kit used two solenoids on a new lockdown bar which strike the metal whenever the flipper buttons are pressed to give the impression that the flippers are real. The impact adds noise to the flipper presses, and the force causes a slight cabinet shake with each strike. Also the 12-game package revision included "Tournament Mode" for the frontend.

On February 1, 2008 Global VR announced a special pricing package for UltraPin, offering all 12 games and the machine for US$3500 + tax + $500 shipping for VPForums members. It was very briefly mentioned in a 2008 Maxim article.

By September 2008 production had stalled and NanoTech had reached an agreement to manufacture a competing product called MultiPin.

On December 1, 2009 NanoTech Entertainment announced the Ultimate UltraPin Upgrade allowing owners to upgrade their machines to use both the original UltraPin software and adding to it additional support for other Pinball engines and games adding a new frontend package.

== Features ==
The game has a lock down bar and a pane of glass like a real game. The tilt sensitivity can be set as well as how much the ball moves from nudging. 2 coin slots, coin door, and bay areas for 2 types of expansion dollar bill acceptors (was sold separately).

== Tables available ==
- Attack From Mars
- Black Knight 2000
- Eight Ball Champ
- Fathom
- Firepower
- FunHouse
- F-14 Tomcat
- Medieval Madness
- Pin*Bot
- Sorcerer
- Strikes & Spares
- Xenon

== Awards and legacy ==
The machine won an award for innovation at Amusement and Music Operators Association (AMOA) annual tradeshow in 2006.
