= John Popadiuk =

Canadian pinball machine designer (born 1962)

- Born: John A. Popadiuk Jr.
- Occupation: Pinball designer
- Employer: Zidware
- Known for: Cirqus Voltaire; World Cup Soccer; Theatre of Magic; Tales of the Arabian Nights; Star Wars Episode I
- Spouse: Michelle Popadiuk
- Children: 3

John A. Popadiuk Jr. is a Canadian pinball machine designer. He started work in the business at 19 for Bally in 1980, and later at WMS Gaming from 1989 to 2000. In 2017, he joined deeproot Tech as exclusive game designer.

He is credited as principal designer for many popular pinball machines from the 1990s including Theatre of Magic, Tales of the Arabian Nights, World Cup Soccer, Star Wars Episode I, and Cirqus Voltaire.

== Background ==
Early on, Popadiuk read Roger Sharpe's pinball book, and saw the name Norm Clarke, who was currently working at Bally at the time. Popadiuk wrote Clarke a letter, to which Clarke responded, "If you're ever in Chicago, drop me a line and we'll give you a tour." Two weeks later, Popadiuk flew to Chicago and got a tour of the new Bally factory in Bensenville. Clarke offered to drive Popadiuk back to the airport, but instead hired Popadiuk after he demanded a job. They hired him as a technician in engineering because he had experience troubleshooting games with a pinball router in Toronto. One of the designs Popadiuk had developed while still in Toronto was Alice in Wonderland, which would later become a theme he would revisit.

In 1989, Popadiuk arrived at the new office. His first project was Ice Castle, which was never produced. He shared an office with another designer, and was eventually assigned to work on a pinball based on the 1994 FIFA World Cup, which became World Cup Soccer.

He worked on four other titles before Williams shut down the pinball division. Theatre of Magic was originally going to be licensed as "The Magic of David Copperfield" but terms were not agreed.

Cirqus Voltaire originally started as Circus Pirates, then Circus Maximus, but eventually became Voltaire because the market in France wanted it. It was a very unsuccessful title on test, earning only $47 the first week in Waukesha, Wisconsin compared to $350–400 for some of the other titles.

After Williams exited the pinball business in 2000, Popadiuk started a short-lived neon sign business named "Duke's Neon" in the Northwest Chicago suburbs. He also designed a line of toy pinball machines for a now-defunct company named Zizzle between 2006 and 2007.

Between 2009 and 2010, Popadiuk developed two iOS apps: Pinball Scrapbook and Pinball Wizard.

In 2011 he started a company Zidware, where he designed and collected preorders for three pinball themes: Magic Girl (loosely based on Theatre of Magic), Retro Atomic Zombie Adventure (initially known as Ben Heck Zombie Adventure), and Alice in Wonderland. He also worked on a foam board prototype of a Kiss pinball machine in 2014 with the intention of obtaining a license to produce a Kiss-themed game. Other project ideas that he claimed to be working on during this time were a MakerBot pinball project, a bowling-themed pinball, and an electro-mechanical project. Individuals who had paid for preorders for Popadiuk's other three games that were under development criticized Popadiuk for focusing on the Kiss project and other concepts, rather than on the other machines he was already contracted to build. A year later in mid-2015, Stern Pinball released a new version of a Kiss pinball machine, which appeared to make Popadiuk's Kiss project irrelevant.

In May 2015, Popadiuk announced that he was out of funding. Not only was he unable to finish the Magic Girl prototype, but he had no way of funding the manufacturing of them. One of his buyers, Bill Brandes, formed a company called "Pintasia" in April 2015 where he intended to license the themes and find a way to manufacture them. Between various volunteers, they took one of the prototypes as far as they could in a few short weeks so it could be shown at the Northwest Pinball Show. The machine was analyzed for completeness, and the amount it would cost to not only finish the prototype but manufacture. When Brandes realized the project wasn't as close to completion as promised by Popadiuk, Brandes announced on June 10, 2015 that he could not move this project forward and it would be cancelled.

In 2016, John Popadiuk contracted with American Pinball to produce his Magic Girl prototypes in an attempt to fulfill obligations to preorder customers. Games in an unfinished state were delivered to customers with a note from the manufacturer stating that they were built to Popadiuk's specifications. Many of the core features did not work, although after over 1,000 hours of work one machine was completed by others in 2022. Popadiuk was also contracted to produce a Houdini game for American Pinball, which had an early concept displayed at Pinball Expo. Popadiuk was fired from American Pinball due to being unable to finish the project. American Pinball would later scrap Popadiuk's work and create and release their own Houdini game not based on Popadiuk's design.

In 2017, Popadiuk joined deeproot Pinball, a company founded and managed by Robert J. Mueller of San Antonio, Texas. deeproot Pinball planned to finish and release Magic Girl, Retro Atomic Zombie Adventureland, and Alice in Wonderland among other titles from known pinball designers. After repeated delays and missed deadlines, a prototype of Retro Atomic Zombie Adventureland was revealed and went up for preorder in December 2020. As of August 2021 no units had been delivered to preorder customers.

On August 20, 2021 the SEC charged Robert J. Mueller of misappropriating investor money into deeproot Pinball and his own personal enrichment, calling it a "Ponzi-like scheme".

== Lawsuit ==
Customers who preordered games through Zidware filed legal action against Popadiuk in 2015 for being unable to honor his obligations stated in his contract. On February 14, 2017 there was an email sent out both by Popadiuk and Scott Goldberg claiming that all of the Magic Girl games were complete and ready to pickup or ship by the end of the month.

On May 1, 2018, the Circuit Court of Cook County ruled that Popadiuk was responsible the 26 claims by the plaintiffs for failure to deliver. Popadiuk had sued the buyers themselves for non-payment of future games in the amount of $100,002 and attempted to split it into 26 separate cases. The judge ruled this a waste of time and resources.

== Games designed ==
- World Cup Soccer
- Tales of the Arabian Nights
- Theatre of Magic
- Cirqus Voltaire
- Star Wars Episode I
- Zizzle Marvel Heroes vs Villains
- Zizzle Pirates of the Caribbean
- Zizzle Marvel Super Heroes
- Zizzle Pirates of the Caribbean At World's End
- Magic Girl (Early Prototype)
- Ben Heck's Zombie Adventureland (Concept Art)
- Retro Atomic Zombie Adventureland (Early Concept)
- Alice in Wonderland (Early Concept)
- Houdini (Early Concept)
- Retro Atomic Zombie Adventureland (Prototype with deeproot Pinball based on reworked Zidware early concept)
