= Junk Yard (pinball) =

1996 pinball machine

- Manufacturer: Williams
- Release date: December 1996
- System: Williams WPC-95
- Design: Barry Oursler, Dwight Sullivan
- Programming: Dwight Sullivan, Graham West
- Artwork: Paul Barker, Pat McMahon, Linda Deal (aka Doane)
- Voices: Tim Kitzrow
- Production run: 3,013

Junk Yard is a pinball game released by Williams Electronics in 1996. The game uses the DCS sound system. The game was advertised with the slogan "The meanest game in the whole darn town.".

== Design ==
The prototype differs from the production version. Dwight Sullivan published the in-game story of creating the various contraptions.

The junkyard is located near Tony's Palace which is shown on the backglass, and was the location used in WHO Dunnit.

== Description ==
The playfield of Junk Yard contains different toys e.g. a crane with a wrecking ball - a pinball hanging from a chain, a toilet that flushes the ball and a doghouse with an attack dog.

The player assumes the role of an inventor who is locked inside a junkyard after it has closed for the night and must find a way to escape. The goal is to collect pieces of junk and build various machines (shown on the blueprint in the center of the playfield), each of which enables a mode or mini-game when completed. Once all the modes have been played, the player can start one more mode involving a battle against the junkyard owner in outer space. A devil and angel give tips to the player on what to do. Slingshots are lit by controlled lights, so either the angel or devil can be lit. The game also contains modes featured in previous Williams pinball titles, such as the video mode from Attack from Mars.

The game uses an instrumental version of the song "Money (That's What I Want)" as its primary background music.

== Reception ==
Pinball Mag retro review.

== Digital versions ==
Junk Yard released for The Pinball Arcade in 2014, and was available until June 30, 2018 when the Williams license expired.

Zen Studios released a version of the table with optional additional animations announced for Pinball FX3 on October 9, 2018; with a remastered version released for Pinball FX on March 31, 2022.
