= Fire! (pinball) =

1987 pinball machine

- advertising flyer
- Manufacturer: Williams
- Release date: June 1987
- System: Williams System 11A
- Design: Barry Oursler, Mark Sprenger
- Programming: Dan Lee
- Artwork: Mark Sprenger
- Music: Chris Granner
- Sound: Brian Schmidt, Rich Karstens, Chris Granner
- Voices: Mark Ritchie
- Production run: 7,697 (approximate); 273 (Champagne edition, approximate)

Fire! is a 1987 Williams pinball machine designed by Barry Oursler and Mark Sprenger.

== Design ==
The game is themed on the Great Chicago fire of 8-10 October 1871. A mooing cow sound plays at the start of a game because of the legend of a cow starting the fire. This was the first cow in a modern Williams pinball machine, but is unrelated to the cow easter eggs in later machines.

The game includes several vacuum-formed buildings with decals. Production of these was outsourced to a nearby facility for disabled people, and produced to a higher quality than would have been likely on the Williams production line.

A rotating cylinder underneath the middle of the playfield simulates buildings on fire. A bell is on the top of the backbox. The game uses four displays in the backbox: the top two are alphanumeric, and the lower two are numeric.

At least three different playfield variations exist, with differing holes for switches in the skill shot shooter lane.

=== Champagne edition ===
A version of the game in a wood-grain cabinet is called the champagne edition. It uses brass trim instead of the usual steel legs and rails, and had additional animation in the backbox using two of the rotating cylinders used underneath the playfield of the standard edition; these cylinders rotate during multiball to create a fire effect on the backglass. The playfield of both versions is the same. This version was designed to fit in fern bars and look like a piece of furniture to blend in better than a painted cabinet. The concept of this version began when artist Mark Sprenger was reviewing cabinet graphics at Churchill Cabinets, with the decision to manufacture them made by the management of Williams.

== Layout ==
The playfield has a symmetrical layout. The shooter lane includes a series of five rollovers. The game has two flippers ate the bottom of the playfield, and a "fireplug" post that can raise to block the gap between the flippers. Two sets of three targets are located near the top of the playfield. On either side of this area is a "fire-escape" ramp which each have a target as a dead-end. A horseshoe lane starts/ends to the side of these ramps; at each side of this horseshoe is another ramp which can lower. A further set of three targets is on each side of the playfield. Between the two upper sets of targets is a ladder ramp which can raise up.

== Gameplay ==
The game starts with a skill shot up the shooter lane where the player attempts to launch the ball with the correct force to reach the highest scoring rollover without hitting the subsequent rollover. A playfield multiplier is shown on the playfield with a series of lights and starts at 10X; as the game is played fires start that the player attempts to put out by hitting various targets and if not successful in a limited time lowers the playfield multiplier. The game has a three-ball multiball that the player can start by hitting targets to lower the ramps at the horseshoe and locking balls. During the multiball the player attempts to put out five fires, and can score 1M points if successful.

== Reception ==
Pinball Player found the game to be initially confusing, and the lack of indication when fires were out during multiball to be frustrating.

== Digital versions ==
Fire! released for Pinball FX on April 30, 2026. This was the first official digital recreation of the machine.
