= UltraCade Technologies =

- Founded: 2002
- Founder: David R. Foley
- Headquarters: San Jose, California, United States
- Website: Archived official website

UltraCade Technologies logo

UltraCade Technologies, also known simply as UltraCade, was a computer and video game hardware company, founded in 2002 by David R. Foley.

Founded on the original UltraCade multi-game platform that Foley's design team developed in the mid-1990s, featuring multiple classic arcade games emulated on PC hardware running proprietary operating system and emulation code.

The platform was originally developed under the HyperWare flag. In 1998, Foley sold HyperWare to Quantum3D where the product saw its first commercial release. In 2000, HyperWare was spun back out from Quantum3D with the help of external investors. After the investors pulled out in late 2002 and HyperWare shut down, Foley hired back the core staff and revived the platform under the UltraCade Technologies banner. In late 2005, the sale of UltraCade Technologies to Global VR was initiated but did not complete. In June 2006, Global VR agreed to acquire some of the assets of UltraCade Technologies, and the non-exclusive rights to some of the code used in the UltraCade platform. As of May 2012 the terms of the sale to Global VR have not been satisfied and the transaction not completed.

In July 2009 a grand jury indicted David R. Foley on 35 counts, claiming that he sold counterfeited game packs for the UltraCade platform. On January 9, 2012, Foley pleaded guilty to conspiracy charges related to sales of UltraCade game software and making false statements on loan applications while all claims of counterfeiting were dropped.

== Arcade machines ==
- UltraCade Multi-Game System
- Happ Arcade Classics
- Arcade Legends
- Ultimate Arcade
- Taito Arcade Classics
- Breeders' Cup - Tournament Edition
- Feeding Frenzy
- Tag'em
- Street Fighter Anniversary Edition
- Dragon's Lair 25th Anniversary
- UltraPin

== Casino machines ==
- Peek-A-Boo Poker
- Breeders' Cup Slot Machine

== Hardware ==
- uVC
- uVI
- USBlinx II
- ArcadeAMP
- ITG-IO
- uShock
- uGCI-4
- uGCI-6
- GCI-6
