= Kiss Pinball =

2000 video game

KISS Pinball
- Developers: Wildfire Studios; Tarantula Studios (PlayStation)
- Publishers: On Deck Interactive; Take-Two Interactive (PlayStation)
- Platforms: Microsoft Windows; PlayStation
- Release: Windows: NA: November 3, 2000; EU: November 8, 2000; PlayStation: EU: March 23, 2001; NA: April 25, 2001
- Genre: Pinball
- Modes: Single-player, multiplayer

Kiss Pinball is a video game developed by Wildfire Studios and published by On Deck Interactive for Microsoft Windows in 2000. A port for PlayStation, developed by Tarantula Studios, was released by Take-Two Interactive in 2001.

== Gameplay ==
Concerning gameplay, "most of the game revolves around hitting targets to start KISS shows, then hitting more targets to complete the shows....Nudging the ball, which is accomplished by hitting the D-pad, simply causes the ball to jerk an inch or two in the direction you pressed." The game "features two tables, Last Stop Oblivion and Netherworld."

== Reception ==
Reception

Aggregate scores
Aggregator	Score	
Aggregator	PC	PS
GameRankings	61%	36%
Metacritic	N/A	26/100

Review scores
Publication	Score	
Publication	PC	PS
AllGame	2/5	1/5
Electronic Gaming Monthly	N/A	1/10
EP Daily	6/10	N/A
GameRevolution	N/A	F
GameSpot	N/A	1.3/10
IGN	N/A	3/10
Jeuxvideo.com	10/20	N/A
Next Generation	N/A	2/5
PlayStation Official Magazine – UK	N/A	1/10
Official U.S. PlayStation Magazine	N/A	1.5/5
PC Gamer (US)	60%	N/A

The PlayStation version received "generally unfavorable reviews" according to the review aggregation website Metacritic.

Jeff Gerstmann of GameSpot declared, "KISS Pinball manages to mangle both the KISS license and the concept of video pinball to the point of being almost totally unrecognizable....KISS Pinball serves no useful purpose whatsoever. KISS fans will be disappointed by the distinct lack of KISS, and pinball fans will be disappointed by the distinct lack of pinball. Even at the low price of $9.99, this one is no bargain." Eric Bratcher of NextGen said that the game was "far from the hardest-rocking show in history, but the ticket price is hard to resist." Iron Thumbs of GamePro's website-only review said, "Gamers needing their retro KISS fix are better off picking up Destroyer on vinyl, because KISS Pinball scores a big, fat tilt." (Note: GamePro gave the PlayStation version 2/5 for graphics, two 1.5/5 scores for sound and fun factor, and 3/5 for control.) Paul Davidson of San Francisco Chronicle said, "The Kiss Pinball package for home computers and gaming systems wasn't exactly a smash success."

The PlayStation version was a runner-up for the "Worst Game" award at GameSpot's Best and Worst of 2001 Awards, which went to Kabuki Warriors.

== See also ==
- Kiss (pinball)
