= Cirqus Voltaire =

1997 pinball machine

- Manufacturer: Williams Electronics Games
- Release date: October 1997
- System: WPC-95
- Design: John Popadiuk, Cameron Silver
- Programming: Cameron Silver
- Artwork: Linda Deal (aka Doane)
- Mechanics: Jack Skalon, Louis Toy
- Music: Rob Berry
- Sound: Rob Berry
- Production run: 2,704

Cirqus Voltaire is a 1997 pinball game, designed by John Popadiuk and released by Williams Electronics Games (under the Bally label). The theme involves the player performing many different marvels in order to join the circus. Some of the game's distinctive features include a neon light running along the right ramp return, a pop bumper that rises up from the middle of the playfield at certain times, and a magnet at the top of the left ramp that can catch balls and divert them into the locks. The most notable feature is the Ringmaster, a head that rises at certain times and taunts the player.

== Design ==
The name of the game is partly based on Voltaire.

It was the first Williams/Bally pinball machine without a real replay-knocker, a device driven by a coil to produce a loud bang when hammering against the wood of the cabinet or backbox. Instead this sound effect was pre-recorded and played via the speakers. It was also the second machine (after Capcom's Flipper Football released in 1996) to move the dot-matrix display (DMD) from the backbox right into the cabinet, but the idea of placing the display there was conceived earlier by John Trudeau in a canceled game called Aces to not distract the player from the game when watching the display (an idea that was expanded upon with the Pinball 2000 architecture two years later).

A development timeline was published on Williams website.

A series of three whitewoods were produced. The ringmaster mechanism was introduced on the second whitewood. On sample production games the ringmaster had a thinner face than on the final production machines.

The production run of Medieval Madness was curtailed to allow manufacture of this machine.

== Modes ==
This game features nine "marvels" the player must complete before they are invited to "Join the Cirqus." The marvels are arranged in a 3x3 square grid, with each row/column corresponding to one letter in the word C-I-R-Q-U-S. After filling the grid, the player must shoot the left or right orbit to start the "Join the Cirqus" wizard mode.

- Juggler - Shoot the left orbit three times to enable locks, then shoot it three more times to lock balls and start Juggler Multiball.
- Side Show - Shoot the left orbit when the Side Show is lit to spot this marvel and receive a random award. One of the side show awards is the video mode "The Amazing Roonie" where the player attempts to jump over a series of obstacles.
- Ringmaster Frenzie - Defeat the Ringmaster twice to start Frenzie Multiball.
- Menagerie - Hit a group of targets on the left side a set number of times, either directly or by knocking a large plastic captive ball into them.
- Defeated All Ringmasters - Defeat the Ringmaster four times to start Special Multiball.
- Highwire Multiball - Hit the "Light Lock" targets on either side of the left ramp, then shoot the ramp itself three times to lock balls and start Highwire Multiball.
- Spin - The spinner target in the small loop that curves around the Ringmaster can be shot to light letters in S-P-I-N; the marvel is awarded once all four letters are lit.
- Boom! - Hit the rollover targets on the field to light letters in V-O-L-T. Once all four letters are collected, a third pop bumper rises from the field for a short time; the marvel is awarded after the time runs out. Hits on this bumper count toward lighting an extra ball.
- Acrobats - Shoot the right ramp/orbit four times.

== The Ringmaster ==
The Ringmaster normally resides below the playfield, with a flat circular platform attached to the top of his head. This platform sits directly in front of the three W-O-W targets in the upper right corner and contains a hidden magnet. Once the targets have been hit a total of three times, the magnet catches and holds the ball as the Ringmaster rises and taunts the player. The ball is then flung off in a random direction, with a brief ball saver in case it flies out of play. After the Ringmaster and/or the standup targets immediately to either side are hit a total of five times, he rises farther to expose a hole; shooting a ball into this hole results in his defeat.

Until Join the Cirqus is played for the first time, each defeated Ringmaster after the first starts a multiball mode, in the following order:

- Ringmaster Frenzie - Completing this multiball awards the Frenzie marvel.
- Ringmaster Razz - Starting this multiball for the first time lights an extra ball.
- Ringmaster Special - Completing this multiball awards the "Defeated All Ringmasters" marvel.
- Ringmaster Battle - Can only be played if "Defeated All Ringmasters" is not the last marvel collected; a ball saver is active throughout it. This is the only Ringmaster multiball styled as a fight that the player can win or lose. Each hit on the Ringmaster or standups lights one of the five diamonds in front of him; but one light will go out every few seconds or whenever a ball drains. If the player wins, an extra ball is lit and the Ringmaster is disabled until Join the Cirqus has been played. If the Ringmaster wins, the player can raise and defeat him again to start a new Battle round.

After Join the Cirqus is played and regular play resumes, the first Ringmaster defeat starts Frenzie and further defeats follow the above progression.

If the Ringmaster throws the ball into the Highwire Multiball lock, the player is credited with a "Sneaky Lock" toward starting that mode.

== Multiball ==
This game features eight multiball modes, which can be "stacked" or made to run concurrently in various combinations. These are:

- Highwire Multiball (see "Marvels" above), three balls
- Juggler Multiball (see "Marvels" above), three balls
- Neon Multiball (one of the Side Show random awards), three balls
- Strike-an-Arc Multiball (started by shooting the left ramp a set number of times), two balls
- Ringmaster (see "The Ringmaster" above), two balls each
  - Ringmaster Frenzie
  - Ringmaster Razz
  - Ringmaster Special
  - Ringmaster Battle

When multiballs are stacked, a total of four balls are put into play. Once every ball except one has drained, the player has a short time to shoot the left ramp and score "Voltaire's Multiple Jackpots," an award consisting of one jackpot from every multiball that had been in effect.

== Join the Cirqus ==
After collecting all nine marvels, the player can start Join the Cirqus by shooting either orbit. Play then proceeds through four phases, with all other features disabled. After each of the first three phases is completed, the flippers and targets briefly go dead and all the balls drain as part of the lead-in to the next phase.

1. Spell C-I-R-Q-U-S: A three-ball multiball. Hit all six major shots (both orbits, left ramp, Menagerie, Ringmaster loop, W-O-W targets) in any order.
2. Unmask Voltaire: A three-ball multiball. Hit the Ringmaster and then the left ramp, alternating between them four times, and hit the Ringmaster a fifth time.
3. Meet the Cirqus: Make six lit shots to the orbits and Ringmaster loop. This phase starts with one ball and adds one for each successful shot, to a maximum of three.
4. Party Multiball: A four-ball multiball with all major shots lit for jackpots.

If all balls drain during any of the first three phases, that phase will restart on the player's next ball. The fourth phase ends after all balls but one have drained.

== Digital versions ==
Cirqus Voltaire was released as a licensed table of The Pinball Arcade for several platforms from 2012, and was available until June 30, 2018, due to WMS license expiration. The license was then obtained by Zen Studios, who released an official digital version of the table as an add-on for Pinball FX3 and an unlockable table in the Williams Pinball mobile app for iOS and Android as part of the fifth wave of Zen Studios' curation of Williams tables. A remastered version released for Pinball FX on May 26, 2022.

Unlicensed recreations of the game are available for Visual Pinball that runs on Windows.

== Remake ==
In March 2026 American Pinball announced a remake of Cirqus Voltaire. Two versions were released: a classic edition closely resembling the original, and the Ringmaster edition. The Ringmaster edition uses a new art package and topper, with upgraded graphics on a LCD display. The neon tube used in the original is replaced with a LED strip. This version is limited to 772 units, due to 1772 being the year Voltaire founded the Troupe le Voltaire in the backstory of this machine. The game includes an updated version of the rules which was first released in 2002. It is the first of seven Williams/Bally games licensed by American Pinball.
