= Theatre of Magic =

1995 pinball machine

- Manufacturer: Midway
- Release date: March 1995
- System: Williams WPC Security (WPC-S)
- Design: John Popadiuk
- Programming: Jeff Johnson
- Artwork: Linda Deal (a.k.a. Doane)
- Mechanics: Jack Skalon, Ernie Pizarro
- Music: Dave Zabriskie
- Sound: Dave Zabriskie
- Production run: 6,600 units

Theatre of Magic is a 1995 pinball machine designed by John Popadiuk, produced by the Midway division of Williams (under the Bally brand name). The player assumes the role of a novice magician who must develop their skills by exploring the titular theatre and performing an assortment of stage illusions to become a master magician. It was originally designed as "The Magic of David Copperfield", but was changed after Midway and Copperfield were unable to reach an agreement concerning the use of his name and likeness. Coincidentally Capcom also released a magic-themed pinball table, Pinball Magic, in 1995.

== Design ==
The general theme of the game was conceived before the designer completed his prior game World Cup Soccer.

The earliest design of the game using a conceptual model left an area of the playfield open, to place an illusion created by David Copperfield if he agreed to the suggestion.

The cabinet that contains the game is designed to have the appearance of an old magician's trunk; this was suggested by Greg Freres. An early version of Photoshop was used to create the artwork, Nick Erlich assisted Linda Deal with the look of the cabinet.

The prototype games had an up-post between the flippers, but this was removed before production began.

The flippers are positioned to droop slightly more than on other games of the time to make it easier to hit the orbits.

The most prominent feature on the table is the Magic Trunk, which can rotate to show four different sides during play. One side has a hole that can be shot to collect awards and start modes, and another has a magnet that can catch and hold the ball before rotating to drop it into a sinkhole beneath the playfield. This trunk was inspired by Houdini's magic trunk. The spirit ring uses a magnet to grab the ball from the left ramp, and place it on the right ramp.

The rollovers above the bumpers at the back of the playfield are located so the player cannot see them directly, but must instead watch their reflection in a mirror on the back wall behind them. The playfield in this area is printed backwards so it reads correctly in the mirror.

The voices for the game were recorded by opera singer Mike Wadsworth, and actor/comedian Cathy Schenkelberg.

== Gameplay ==
The game presents four primary objectives, each of which must be completed in order to qualify for the "Grand Finale" wizard mode.

- Theatre: The player spells T-H-E-A-T-R-E by shooting the left outer loop. Doing so begins a short countdown, in which the player needs to hit the ball into the Magic Trunk hole.
- Multiball: The player spells M-A-G-I-C by shooting the ramps, lighting the inner loop to lock balls. Once two are locked, the Magic Trunk magnet can be hit to begin Theatre Multiball. This is a three-ball mode in which jackpots are lit by hitting the Magic Trunk a set number of times, then collected by hitting it once more. In addition, a shot to the Magic Trunk within the first few seconds scores 100 million.
- Midnight Madness: Repeated shots to the right outer loop advance the clock one hour at a time, starting from noon. Once it reaches midnight, the Midnight Madness round begins, with the clock running backwards and shots to the Magic Trunk awarding points based on the hour it shows. The clock can also be advanced with a skill shot or as a random award for sending the ball into the basement when the Trapdoor is open.
- Illusions: Hit the Magic Trunk three times to rotate it, then shoot a ball into its hole to start one of the following eight modes.
  - Tiger Saw — Hit the captive ball for various animations of a tiger cutting apart items with a circular saw.
  - Levitating Woman — Shoot the center ramp for increasing millions.
  - Trunk Escape — Shoot the Magic Trunk four times to break the chains of a locked trunk.
  - Spirit Cards — Shoot the inner loops/spinner to award increasing points per spin.
  - Safe Escape — Shoot the inner loops three times to unlock the safe.
  - Metamorphosis — Shoot the right ramp to transform the assistant to various animals and score increasing millions.
  - Strait Jacket — Hit the jet bumpers repeatedly to undo a buckle and escape a straitjacket as spiked walls close in.
  - Hat Magic — Shoot the Magic Trunk to see different items being produced from a hat.

Once all four objectives have been completed, the player can start Grand Finale by shooting either inner loop. The goal is to make 12 ramp, loop, or trunk shots within 60 seconds in order to spell MAGIC THEATRE; each shot awards 50 million, with a bonus of 500 million for completing the mode.

If the ball falls into the lock hole behind the Magic Trunk due to a weak inner loop shot before MAGIC has been completed, the player is credited with a "Secret Ball Lock" toward Theatre Multiball and any remaining letters are automatically lit to enable the next lock.

Repeated hits to a captive ball on the left side of the playfield enable a "Vanish Lock" on the left outer loop. Once the player has locked a ball here, the right outer loop can be shot to begin Tiger Saw Multiball, a two-ball mode in which hits to the captive ball award increasing points. If the player shoots the Vanish Lock and then begins Theatre Multiball, a total of four balls are put into play.

Two "Hocus Pocus" standup targets are located on the left edge of the playfield. Hitting either target activates a pair of magnetic ball savers, one at the top of each outlane. They remain active for 15 seconds or until a ball starts to drain, whichever occurs first, and will shift the ball back into the inlane when triggered.

There is a video mode which is digital pinball played on the display. The player has a limited time to hit six drop-targets.

The game uses the DCS Sound System. Like many of the mid-90s Williams tables it was designed for both novice and expert players.

Codes for use in Mortal Kombat 3 could be found by the player if they held the right flipper before starting a game. Holding the left flipper could start a game of digital pinball on the DMD.

== Reception ==
Games on test locations raised US $450-550 per week.

A review in Play Meter noted that the game had a timeless theme.

GameRoom found the sound to be spectacular, and the artwork to be eye-catching with the unusual use of brown as the primary color.

The game was nominated for the AMOA 1996 most innovative pinball game.

In a 2021 review for Pinball Mag, the game was awarded 8/10 with the gameplay, immersion of the theme, and sound particularly liked, with these factors rated at 9/10. The magic trunk was praised for being particularly inventive. The choice of video mode was questioned for not fitting with the theme of the game, pointing out that something could have been done with rabbits and hats, or card throwing instead.

== Digital versions ==
Theatre of Magic was released for The Pinball Arcade in 2012, but delisted on June 30, 2018 due to WMS license expiration.

It released as part of Williams volume 3 for Pinball FX3 on March 19, 2019; with a remastered version released for Pinball FX on March 31, 2022.
