= Kiss (pinball) =

Series of pinball machines

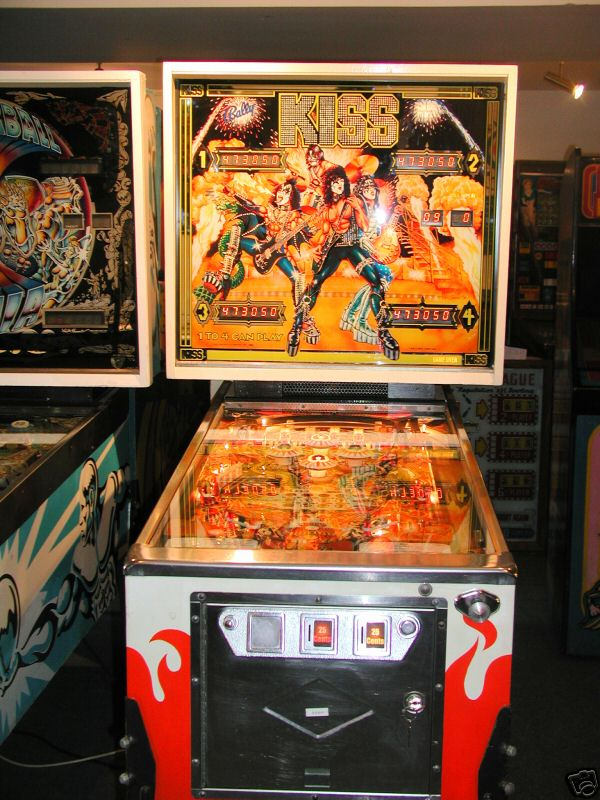
KISS Pinball by Bally 1979

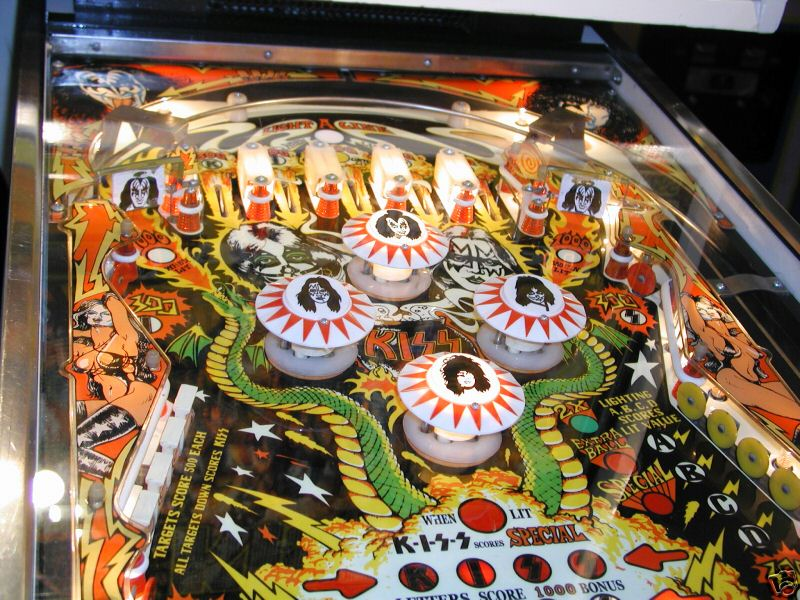
Closeup of playing surface of KISS Pinball by Bally 1979

Kiss-themed pinball machines were produced by Bally in 1979 and Stern in 2015. There are also some pinball machine conversion kits, a Kiss pinball machine prototype and a Kiss pinball video game.

== History ==
In 1979 the first Kiss arcade pinball machine was produced by Bally, and stayed in circulation well into the 1980s. In 1978, Barry Imhoff declared, "there will be 20,000 Kiss machines." 17,000 produced Kiss pinball machines are confirmed.

John Popadiuk produced a Kiss-themed pinball machine prototype in 2014 but the game never went in production.

== Layout ==
The Bally playfield has an almost symmetrical layout.

== Stern Pinball release ==
In 2015, Stern released a Kiss-themed pinball machine.

== In popular culture ==
A Bally Kiss pinball machine can be seen in the bar scene of the 1981 slasher film Friday the 13th Part 2, in 1986's Psycho III, in the 1988 Swedish film Strul, as well as in the television show Dallas as a part of the 20th episode of season 6 entitled "Brothers and Sisters" during a bar scene with J.R. Ewing and Walt Driscoll. In “Detroit Rock City” filmed in 1999 then later seen in “Role Models” with Sean William Scott and Paul Rudd in 2008.

== See also ==
- Kiss Pinball - a Kiss pinball video game
