= Judge Dredd (pinball) =

1993 pinball machine

- Manufacturer: WMS (trade name: Bally Manufacturing)
- Release date: September 1993
- System: WPC (DCS)
- Design: John Trudeau
- Programming: Jeff Johnson
- Artwork: Kevin O'Connor
- Mechanics: Ernie Pizarro
- Music: Paul Heitsch, Vince Portarelli
- Sound: Paul Heitsch
- Voices: Tim Kitzrow (Judge Dredd), Rich Karstens
- Animation: Eugene Geer, Scott Slomiany
- Production run: 6,990

Judge Dredd is a pinball machine produced by Bally Manufacturing in 1993, based on the British comic strip Judge Dredd from 2000 AD. It is the second pinball game to use the DCS sound system. It is the only pinball machine to include a "Super Game" in addition to the standard game.

== Development ==
The license of Judge Dredd was obtained by Roger Sharpe. Despite Judge Dredd being relatively unknown in the US, the designer, John Trudeau stated "you don't have to know him to play the game....if you don't, it is still fun".

The original design of Judge Dredd used a patented rotating mechanism called Deadworld, to lock three balls and release them with a crane containing a magnet. Due to concerns by some operators the physical lock mechanism was removed late in development, and Deadworld simplified. The first version of the software for the game used the original mechanism, but later versions of the ROM did not. In 2005 an unofficial modification was released to return the game to its original design.

The game was shown at the 1993 AMOA Expo. A second flyer for the game was produced reprinting the Judge Dredd short story "Pinboing Wizard" which was previously published in the 1981 Judge Dredd Annual written by Judge Dredd creator John Wagner (using the pseudonym John Howard) and illustrated by Mike McMahon.

== Gameplay ==
Judge Dredd has two types of games to choose from. A Regulation game for 1 credit, or a Super Game for 2 credits. At test locations results for use of the Super Game were mixed, and due to increased cost and development time for the feature it was not reused or any other Williams pinball machines.

The game includes a second plunger on the left side, and four flippers including one on the left half-way up the machine, and a smaller one further up towards the right.

The game includes a setting for operators to allow players to buy an extra ball.

=== Regulation game ===
The main objective in a standard game is for the player to complete nine modes: Pursuit, Blackout, Sniper, Battle Tank, Bad Impersonator, Meltdown, Safecracker, Manhunt Millions, and Stakeout. The Bad Impersonator mode allows the player to hit targets to throw food and weapons at a very bad Elvis impersonator shown on the display. The Safecracker mode is similar to another mode on the previous pinball machine created by this design team, Creature from the Black Lagoon.

Completing these nine modes allows the player to start the Ultimate Challenge multiball mode.

A series of five crime scenes can be completed by hitting a variety of shots. The multiball lock can be enabled by the player hitting a set of J-U-D-G-E targets in order; the player then attempts to lock three balls, including the last ball in the Deadworld mechanism. The objective of the multiball is for the player to hit shots to defeat the four Dark Judges, Mortis, Fear, Fire, and Death. Defeating all four judges is a "back door" way to play the Ultimate Challenge.

=== Super Game ===
In a Super Game every ball begins with a two-ball multiball and a "drain shield". If the player hits the set of five J-U-D-G-E targets a six-ball Super Multi-ball begins where a fictional host named Anita Mann introduces the player to one of four multiball modes not in the Regulation game: Mad Bomber, Deadworld Attack, Traffic Jam, and Prison Break. When only a single ball remains on the playfield the rest of that ball is played the same as a standard game.

== Reception ==
In a review for The Flipside the game was initially found to be reasonably fun, but disappointing after it was realized parts of the game were worthless for scoring points; it was especially disappointing after the much better received Creature from the Black Lagoon from the same design team.

Eddie Mole for Pinball Player found player responses to be mixed. Even with the changes to the planet it was still called still a good feature. The sound and animation were praised. The Super Game was found to be ideal for inexperienced players, but recommended the standard game for others.

== Digital versions ==
Farsight Studios released Judge Dredd in December 2015 as a licensed table of The Pinball Arcade for several platforms. It was available until June 30, 2018, when all Williams tables were removed for purchase due to licensing issues.

It was released by Zen Studios for Pinball FX and related games on October 22, 2026.

=== Related game ===
Judge Dredd Pinball was released in 1998 for MS-DOS and Windows as the debut game of developer Pin-Ball Games. Reviewers found the game to have realistic physics, and nice visuals. The game uses an angled top-down view with the display positioned just above the table. The game is not based on the physical pinball table.
