= Who Dunnit =

1995 pinball machine

- Manufacturer: Midway
- Release date: 1995
- System: Midway WPC-Security
- Model #: 50044
- Design: Dwight Sullivan, Barry Oursler
- Programming: Dwight Sullivan
- Artwork: Linda Deal, Paul Barker
- Mechanics: Zofia Bil
- Music: Paul Heitsch
- Sound: Paul Heitsch
- Voices: Tim Kitzrow (Nick Spade); Paul Heitsch (Bruno); Gingi Lahera (Trixie); Vince Pontarelli (Tony); Rachel Davies (Victoria); Ed Boon (Butler)
- Production run: 2,416 units

Who Dunnit is a Midway pinball machine with a 1940s style and a murder mystery theme. The playfield features up to five different murder mysteries in which the player must find clues and evidence by making indicated shots. The machine accepts up to four players, and features four-ball play.

An interpretation of "Peter Gunn" is used as the primary background music, with portions of "Theme from A Summer Place" playing during certain modes.

== Rules ==
The aim of the game is to solve five murder mysteries by interrogating suspects and finding evidence before heading to the Roof in the game to catch the killer. There can be a maximum of four balls in play at any time, and it can support up to four players.

The player may purchase an extra ball at the end of a game, either by using a credit already on the machine or by inserting coins. Bonus credits are awarded for achieving the highest score (Grand Champion) or any of the next four best scores. Players can also enter their initials as Loop Champion or Roof Champion for achieving the most consecutive right ramp shots or the highest score for the Roof, respectively.

If the machine's internal clock reaches 12:00 AM while a game is in progress, it is interrupted for "Midnight Madness," a 4-ball multiball with an extended ball saver in which all targets award 3 million. Normal play resumes after all but one ball has drained.

== Suspects ==
The five characters involved in the cases are Tony, Victoria, Trixie, Butler (previously known as Walter), and Bruno (previously known as Tex). Each case begins with a headline announcing that one character has been murdered; the player's goal is to choose the killer from the remaining four.

The player can gain information by making shots to interrogate one suspect at a time or collect evidence, then making an indicated shot (usually the phone) to choose the killer. An incorrect choice awards points for eliminating an innocent suspect, while a correct choice sends the player to the roof in an attempt to apprehend the killer and close the case (see "The Roof" below).

A suspect being interrogated will always mention the killer by name unless he/she actually is the killer.

== Clues and Equipment ==
The player can collect up to five clues per case; doing so lights up an extra ball. The clues do not provide any information as to the killer's identity, and each new case erases any previously collected clues.

Four pieces of equipment can be earned by making specified shots. Each one remains in effect until the end of the game and affects play as follows.

- Revolver: Increases the jackpot more quickly during Basement Multiball (see below).
- Magnifying Glass: Automatically eliminates one suspect whenever the phone is hit with nothing else lit.
- Flashlight: Awards the Magnifying Glass for hitting the unlit phone, or the Map for hitting the unlit sewer.
- Map: Gives a random award for hitting the sewer with nothing else lit.

== Mystery Slots ==
Three slot machine reels displaying various items and rewards are set into the center of the playfield. Whenever a flashing "SPIN" shot is made (phone, roulette lane, sewer) or a lit outlane is hit, these reels spin and come to a stop, with the result of the spin shown on the display as well. The player scores points and/or receives items based on the following combinations:

- Unmatched images on all three reels, or a Wild on the left or right plus two unmatched images = 5 million points
- Two of one image and an unmatched third, with no Wild showing = Second chance (hit any lit "SPIN" shot within a time limit to complete the trio and collect the reward)
- Single or pair of one image, plus Wild images on all other reels = Same reward as three images together
- Two unmatched images on the sides, Wild Choice in the middle = Choice between the two items on either side
- Three fingerprints = Clue (Bullet, Broken Mirror, etc.) and 10 million points
- Three "JACKPOT" images = Jackpot (starts at 75 million points; increased by hitting jet bumpers during Basement Multiball)
- Three magnifying glasses = Piece of equipment (Revolver, Magnifying Glass, etc.) and 25 million points
- Three BAR images = 100 million points
- Three MULTIBALL images = Start Basement Multiball
- Three EXTRA BALL images = Extra Ball
- Three question marks = Elevator Madness (instant two-ball multiball)
- Three Wild images = The Roof

Shooting the left orbit when it is not lit for a Taxi Chase diverts the ball into the jet bumpers, each of which corresponds to a different reel. Hits to the bumpers nudge the reels; once two or more reels match, the bumpers no longer affect them. After the ball falls into the sinkhole underneath the bumpers, the player receives points or items for the three displayed symbols as listed above.

If the player earns a second chance from a spin triggered by draining the ball down a lit outlane, another ball is automatically put into play.

== Roulette ==
Shooting in the far right lane raises/lowers the roulette bet with every turn of the spinner, and the color of the bet is changed between red and black by hitting two stand-up targets. When the lane is lit and the player shoots the ball into a saucer at its end, the game offers the option to bet or pass. If the player takes the bet, a simulated roulette wheel is spun; the bet is added to the player's score if it stops on the last color hit, or deducted if it does not. The bonus multiplier is increased whether the player wins, loses, or passes.

== Elevator ==
The player can shoot any of the three short center ramps to ride an elevator up or down within Tony's Palace or exit at the current floor. Awards for the individual floors are as follows.

- Basement: Start Basement Multiball (see below).
- Main floor: Light Roulette and Mystery Slots.
- 2nd floor: Collect a clue and 10 million points.
- 3rd floor: Choice between collecting evidence (worth 25 million points) or identifying the killer.
- 4th floor: Mystery Slots spin.
- 5th floor: Same as 3rd.
- 6th floor: Collect a piece of equipment and 25 million points.
- 7th floor: Elevator Madness.
- 8th floor: Choice between interrogating a suspect or identifying the killer.
- Penthouse: Penthouse Party. Can only be accessed if the player has previously hit the Penthouse Key stand-up.
- Roof: Start the Roof phase (see below). Can only be accessed after all other floors have been visited.

Unlike clues, evidence items do provide information that can be used to narrow the pool of suspects (e.g. a set of cufflinks, suggesting that the killer is a man).

After a floor is visited, a bank of three stand-up targets rises to block the ramps; all three must be hit to lower them and access the elevator again. Shots to the Up or Down ramps skip any previously visited floors. Once every floor has been visited, all of them become available.

== Basement Multiball ==
This mode can be started in three different ways:

- Shoot three balls into the lock just below the T-A-X-I targets
- Exit the elevator at the basement
- Win it on the slots

Three balls are put into play, and the sewer, roulette lane, and Mystery target all award jackpots when hit. A jackpot is also awarded once all three elevator ramps (Up, Down, Exit) have been shot; the three stand-ups then rise to block the ramps and must all be hit to lower them.

The jackpot starts at 75 million and increases by 1 million for each jet bumper hit during this multiball, or 5 million per hit if the player has the Revolver. It carries over from one multiball to the next, and stops rising after the first jet bumper hit that brings it to 500 million or higher.

== The Roof ==
This phase of the game involves the player's attempt to catch the killer. It can be started in any of the following ways:

- Choosing the correct suspect after shooting the phone or stopping at the 3rd/5th/8th floor
- Eliminating all the incorrect suspects by repeatedly shooting the phone after collecting the Magnifying Glass
- Spinning three Wild cards on the Slots
- Visiting all other floors in Tony's Palace, then exiting the elevator at the Roof

The player must first shoot the lit Taxi Chase loop within a limited time, starting a hurry-up countdown, then shoot the phone before it times out. Doing so scores the points, closes the case, and starts a four-ball multiball with all major shots lit to collect the hurry-up value. If the player fails to shoot the phone before the countdown times out, another Taxi Chase must be hit to restart it. Once the player either loses the ball, runs out of time during the Taxi Chase phase, or drains all but one ball during the multiball, a new case begins with all clues unlit.

== Digital versions ==
WHO Dunnit was released for The Pinball Arcade for several platforms in 2014, and was available until June 30, 2018, when all Williams tables were removed due to licensing issues.

A version with optional additional animations released for Pinball FX on August 14, 2025.
