= Medieval Madness =

1997 pinball machine

- Manufacturer: Williams
- Release date: June 1997
- System: Williams WPC-95
- Model #: 50059
- Design: Brian Eddy
- Programming: Lyman Sheats
- Artwork: Greg Freres; John Youssi
- Mechanics: Robert C. Friesl
- Music: Dan Forden
- Sound: Dan Forden
- Voices: Tina Fey; Scott Adsit; Andrea Farrell; Greg Freres; Vince Pontarelli; Kevin Dorff
- Production run: 4,016 (1997 edition)

Medieval Madness is a Williams pinball machine released in June 1997. Designed by Brian Eddy and programmed by Lyman Sheats, it had a production run of 4,016 units. Many casual players consider it the greatest pinball game.

Various remake versions were released from 2015 onwards by Chicago Gaming under license from Planetary Pinball who hold the rights for manufacturing Williams pinball machines and parts.

There were hopes at Williams that this would help to resurrect the pinball industry as voiced by Steve Kordek, with the advertising flyer proclaiming "Behold the Renaissance of Pinball". 4,016 units were produced, exceeding the 3,300 threshold for the game to be considered profitable, but manufacture was curtailed to allow production of Cirqus Voltaire.

playfield

== Design and layout ==
The centerpiece of the playfield is an animated castle with a solenoid-controlled portcullis and motorized drawbridge. The mechanical design for the castle was finished the night before the deadline for the completed design of the game; although George Gomez was not part of the design team, he volunteered some of his time and assisted Brian Eddy. One of the game's primary objectives is to "destroy" six castles by hitting the castle's entryway with the pinball. A specific number of hits will lower the drawbridge, exposing the portcullis; additional hits will cause the portcullis to rise, and shooting the ball into the castle entrance generates an explosion effect on the dot matrix display, a lightshow with the towers of the castle moving.

Located to the left of the drawbridge and portcullis is the castle lock where a sufficiently strong shot launches the ball over the moat and into the side of the castle, but weak shots can fall into the moat to be returned towards the left flipper.

Medieval Madness also features two Trolls, animated targets that are normally concealed below the playfield similar, but can pop up during certain gameplay modes.

The catapult ramp is in the lower left corner of the playfield, reached through a one-way gate with the ball launched along a habitrail with a solenoid. There is a looping orbit on either side of the machine, and next to each of these the left and right ramps; a diverter is used on the right ramp to reach damsels in the tower at the top right corner of the machine. The game's ramps introduced a patented feature that would prevent a failed ramp shot from draining straight down the middle between the flippers.

Towards the right of the castle is the Merlin saucer where random awards can be collected, and this is lit from the three stand-up targets towards the bottom right of the machine. There are three bumpers towards the top right of the machine, just below the two upper rollovers.

The fan layout of the game has similarities with Brian Eddy's previous game, Attack from Mars, but this occurred because of other design choices rather than intended from the beginning. In homage to this game a flying saucer is shown on the backglass.

As with most Williams pinball games of the time it was designed to appeal to novice players with the first castle easy to destroy, and appeal to experienced players with a deeper game.

== Gameplay ==
The game begins with a skillshot to hit the flashing rollover above the bumpers, or the player can choose to attempt a super skillshot instead. When lit, Merlin's magic saucer will give the player an award to assist them. To reach the wizard mode "Battle for the Kingdom" the player has to achieve the following goals:

- Joust Champion: Shooting the loop(s) advances Joust and finally lights Joust Madness.
- Patron of Peasants: Shooting the left ramp advances the Peasants and finally lights Peasant Madness.
- Catapult Ace: Shoot the catapult to shoot various items at the castle to light Catapult Madness.
- Defender of Damsels: Shoot up the right ramp to advance the Damsel. The final shot up the tower frees a damsel, and freeing several damsels lights Damsel Madness.
- Master of Trolls: Light the Trolls by hitting the targets in front of the castle. Collect the Trolls in "Merlin's Magic" and finish them off by three shots at the head each to light Troll Madness.
- Castle Crusher: Destroy all six castles beginning with the 5 underlings of the King of Payne.
  - Earl of Ego
  - Sir Psycho
  - Duke of Bourbon
  - Francois de Grimm
  - Lord Howard Hurtz
  - King of Payne

All of these goals have to be repeated several times to get the corresponding insert in front of the castle to light up.

Multiballs:

- Castle Multiball: Light the Lock at the broad side (hole to the left of the castle gate) and lock three balls (same hole). Once activated, the player must shoot either ramp five times to collect the jackpot, denoted knights on the DMD. After all five jackpots have been collected, the castle lock shot lights for a super jackpot and an Extra Ball. More jackpots and super jackpots can be collected until a ball drains.
- Multiball Madness: Each of the sub-missions (except for "Castle Crusher") can light an insert in front of "Merlin's Magic". Collecting at least one can start the Multiball by shooting into "Merlin's Magic": In this phase, all the jackpot ramps are lit and the player can score Jackpots by shooting the lit ramps. If a player hits a ramp that is denoted by a completed sub-mission, the player scores a Super Jackpot instead. If the player shoots the castle lock, a Double Super Jackpot is awarded instead. For each madness completed, the number of balls is denoted as follows:
  - Single Madness: 2 Balls.
  - Two to four Madnesses: 3 Balls.
  - Five Madnesses: 4 Balls.
- Barnyard Multiball: Launch all catapult items (bowling ball, cow, chicken, cat, and skull) at the castle. A series of farmyard animal noises play as the player hits various targets around the playfield
- Battle for the Kingdom This two-phase 4-ball Wizard Mode starts once the player completes the six main objectives and hits the ball in the castle. In the first phase, the player has to collect a Battle Jackpot from each of six shots. In the second phase the player must hit the castle gate seven times, and get inside to score the final jackpot and defeat the King of Payne. Unless the player has any "Troll Bombs", two trolls will be in the way of the gate making hitting the gate more challenging. If the player succeeds in scoring the final jackpot, all remaining balls are drained and the display shows the King of Payne's demise and Merlin announces you are the new King of the realm, and the game continues with all major shots lit for victory laps.

There is a video mode called "Save the Children!" which was coded by Brian Eddy. This involves driving off a flock of falcons before they take three children. The bonus multiplier is increased from completing the two upper rollovers, and has a maximum multiplier of 255.

== Music and voices ==
The music and sounds for this game were composed by Dan Forden. Much of the game's dialogue was written by Scott Adsit and Kevin Dorff, at the time members of The Second City in Chicago.

Tina Fey and Andrea Farrell provided the voices of the various damsels (one of which has a "valley girl" accent), while Greg Freres provided the voices of the jousting announcer and one of the trolls, and Vince Pontarelli provided the voices of Francois Du Grimm and the other troll. The rest of the male voices, including the various knights and the Wizard were provided by Scott Adsit (King of Payne, Merlin, the Duke of Bourbon, and Sir Psycho) and Kevin Dorff (Lord Howard Hurtz and the Earl of Ego). The game had the largest cast of characters of any pinball machine to date.

Dan Forden worked on the Mortal Kombat series of games, and his distinctive "Toasty" first used in Mortal Kombat II, was also used on this machine, alongside the "Fatality" voice line.

== Reception ==
By October 1997 it was at the top of Play Meter's equipment poll of pinball machines, displacing Attack from Mars into second place. Many players consider it to be the greatest pinball machine of all time.

In a retro review in 2020, Nudge Magazine rated the game at 8.4/10, praising the castle, easy to understand gameplay, with humorous and successful theme integration.

The prototype of the remake consistently out-earned all other pinballs at that location over a six month period.

== Digital versions ==
The table was included in the arcade game cabinet UltraPin in 2006.

It released for Pinball Hall of Fame: The Williams Collection on several systems between 2008 and 2011. The same developer released the table in season one of The Pinball Arcade in 2012, and it was available until June 30, 2018, when all Williams tables were removed for purchase due to licensing issues.

Medieval Madness released for Pinball FX3 released on October 9, 2018 in the first volume of Williams tables, and included optional animations. A remastered version released for Pinball FX on March 31, 2022; and a VR version released for Pinball FX VR on May 15, 2025 which included an animated dragon next to the machine.

== Remakes ==
In 2015, Chicago Gaming released the first in a series of Williams remakes under license from Planetary Pinball. Medieval Madness and came in a standard edition, and limited edition. The 1,000 machines of the limited edition included all the features of the standard edition, and a shaker motor. The game was announced in October 2013, with preorders for an anticipated 2014 release, the limited edition sold out within a few hours. Before any were shipped to customers a prototype was put on location at Logan's bar in October 2014. LED's were used in place of the originals incandescent bulbs; it also has stereo instead of mono speakers and an LCD screen instead of a DMD. For this release, the games were assembled at the nearby Stern factory.

Medieval Madness was re-released again in 2019, this time with 3 variants. Classic edition was similar to the original. Special edition included an upgraded display with colour animations, RGB lighting, and enhanced sound. Royal edition included all the features of the special edition and a shaker motor, side mirrors and King of Payne topper, and limited in number produced. The lighting of the topper is tied to the game rules. Following on from Attack from Mars remake, Chicago Gaming manufactured this version at their Cicero factory.

In 2025 there was a further re-release, The Merlin edition, with similar upgrades as the Royal edition, including the King of Payne topper.
