= World Cup Soccer (pinball) =

1994 pinball machine

- Manufacturer: Midway
- Release date: February 1994
- System: Midway WPC-Security
- Design: John Popadiuk, Larry DeMar
- Programming: Larry DeMar, Matt Coriale
- Artwork: Kevin O'Connor
- Mechanics: Jack Skalon
- Music: Vince Pontarelli
- Sound: Vince Pontarelli
- Voices: Tim Kitzrow
- Production run: 8,743 units

World Cup Soccer is a 1994 pinball machine designed by John Popadiuk and Larry DeMar and released by Midway Games. It is based on the 1994 FIFA World Cup, with gameplay mechanics largely centered around the sport. A digital version of the game was available in Pinball FX and its variants.

== Design ==
The game uses assets licensed from FIFA, including the FIFA World Cup 94 logo, and the official mascot, Striker.

The game was designed to appeal to players at every skill level.

A similarly themed game called World Challenge Soccer was produced by a competing manufacturer, Gottlieb. This game was unlicensed and used no FIFA assets.

== Gameplay ==
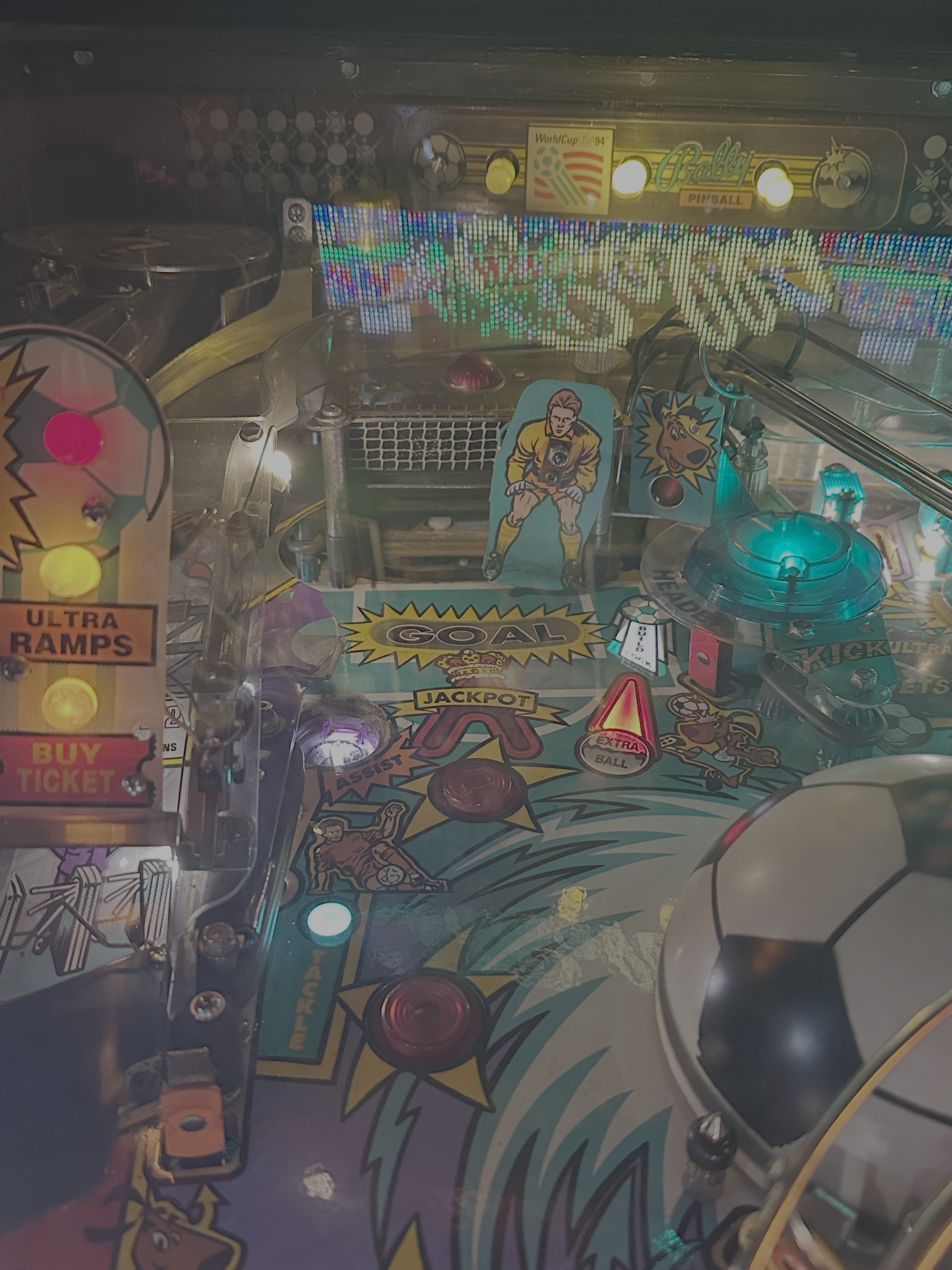
The soccer goal and its keeper with the spinning soccer ball (right) and the free kick zone (left)

The playfield's most prominent mechanic includes a soccer goal defended by an articulating goalkeeper, with players aided by a soccer ball which spins when the goal is lit. To re-light the goal, players must either light four rollover buttons in the center of the playfield or shoot into the free kick zone just below the goal, which shoots the ball directly into the goal after a flipper input.

The main progression path for the game is through multi-ball jackpots, each of which representing a different city whose team the player must defeat. There are 15 ranks total, with Germany ranked first. Players must re-engage multi-ball in order to proceed to the next jackpot.

Players can also complete lanes and ramps in order to travel to nine cities across the United States for points, with Boston, Washington, D.C., and Los Angeles each activating their own respective modes.

- Boston starts the "Boston Tea Party" mini-game, which counts down from 30 million points and awards players the final amount once the left ramp spinner is activated.
- Washington D.C. lights the "Extra Ball" mechanic.
- Los Angeles initiates the "Final Match" wizard mode, in which players have 45 seconds to score more goals than the virtual first-ranked German team. If they succeed, the player earns 500 million points and becomes the 1st ranked team for the rest of the game.

== Reception ==
The Flipside found the game to be simple on the surface, but with plenty of deeper features to keep players returning.

Pinball Player found it to be an enjoyable game that is difficult to master. The long shot to the goal with the moving keeper was praised, and the music was excellent.

== Digital versions ==
This table was formerly available as DLC for The Pinball Arcade until it was removed on June 30, 2018. This was previously published as World Champion Soccer, as FarSight Studios was unable to secure the World Cup license from FIFA. This digital table has many changes; the W-O-R-L-D-C-U-P lights leading to the left loop are replaced by C-H-A-M-P-I-O-N, World Cup USA 94 on the plastics between left in-lanes and out-lanes are renamed to Champion Soccer TPA 17. The backglass was also changed to avoid possible lawsuits from FIFA for using the tournament's mascot Striker, World Cup USA 94 name and any other references to World Cup USA 1994 without the required license.

Zen Studios released the table as a single table DLC for Pinball FX on October 20, 2022. Unlike The Pinball Arcade iteration, this version was fully licensed by FIFA, after FIFA's exclusivity agreement with EA expired. As a result, the game now more closely resembled the 1994 original, with the only notable difference being an updated FIFA License notice on the back glass and on the playfield above the lockdown bar. This also optionally includes an animated version of Striker, the 1994 World Cup mascot, performing tricks at the side of the playfield. Due to licensing reasons the table was removed from sale on April 30, 2026.

== Trivia ==
- Raiden, a character from the Mortal Kombat fighting series, makes a cameo in a bonus round of the game.
- The flyer for the machine depicts an American football field instead of a soccer field in the background. However, the stadium shown is the Soldier Field in Chicago, which held several matches during the 1994 World Cup, among them the opening match.
