= List of pinball machines =

This is an incomplete list of pinball games organized alphabetically by name. In 1976, Michael Colmer published his illustrated history of pinball machines that includes an index of machines. There are also separate lists for machines manufactured by Allied Leisure, Data East, Game Plan, Gottlieb, Inder, Jersey Jack, Maresa, Midway Games, Playmatic, Rally, Sega, Sega, S.A. SONIC, Spooky Pinball, Stern Pinball, and Zaccaria.

== List ==
There are currently 1193 games on this list.

List of pinball machines
Title	Manufacturer	Release date	Ref.
1-2-3	Talleres del Llobregat	1973	
007-Flipper	Lumet	1959-1966 (estimated)	
10th Inning	Williams	February 1964	
1962 World Series	Williams	January 1962	
1963 Major League	Williams	March 1963	
21	Williams	February 24, 1960	
24	Stern Pinball	February 2009	
250 cc	Inder	1992	
2001	Gottlieb	January 1971	
2002	Maresa	1971	
3 Coins	Williams	February 15, 1962	
3-D	Williams	November 1, 1958	
The 30's	Playmatic	April 25, 1977	
"300"	Gottlieb	August 1975	
300	Maresa	1976	
4 Roses	Williams	December 4, 1962	
4 Square	Gottlieb	June 1971	
4-Belles	Gottlieb	October 1954	
4x4	Maresa	1972	
8 Ball	Williams	February 1952	
A-Go-Go	Williams	May 25, 1966	
A.G. Football	Alvin G. & Co	October 1992	
A.G. Soccer-Ball	Alvin G. & Co	October 1991	
ABBA	Pinball Brothers	April 2024	
ABC	United	March 1951	
Abra Ca Dabra	Gottlieb	November 1975	
AC/DC	Stern Pinball	March 2012	
Ace High	Gottlieb	February 1957	
Aces & Kings	Williams	June 8, 1970	
Aces High	Bally	August 1965	
Across the Board	United	September 1952	
Action	Chicago Coin	September 15, 1969	
Action Baseball	Williams	March 1971	
Add-A-Ball	Williams	September 1961	
The Addams Family	Midway	March 1992	
Adventure	Sega	January 1979	
Adventures of Rocky and Bullwinkle and Friends	Data East	February 1, 1993	
Aerobatics	Zaccaria	February 1977	
Aerosmith	Stern Pinball	January 2017	
Af-Tor	Wico	October 1984	
Agents 777	GamePlan	March 1985	
Air Aces	Bally	February 1975	
Airborne	Capcom Coin-Op	March 1996	
Airborne Avenger	Atari	September 1977	
Airport	Genco	May 1939	
Airport	Gottlieb	April 1969	
Aladdin's Castle	Bally	June 1976	
Alaska	Interflip S.A.	May 1978	
Algar	Williams	November 1980	
Ali	Stern Electronics	March 1980	
Ali Baba	Gottlieb	June 1948	
Ali Baba	Sega		
Alice Cooper's Nightmare Castle	Spooky Pinball	March 2018	
Alice Goes To Wonderland	Wonderland Amusements	March 2025	
Alice in Wonderland	Gottlieb	August 1948	
Alice’s Adventures in Wonderland	Dutch Pinball	October 2024	
Alien	Heighway Pinball, Pinball Brothers	February 2017	
Alien Poker	Williams	October 1980	
Alien Star	Gottlieb	June 1984	
All-American Quarterback	Williams	1952	
All Star Baseball	Williams	February 1954	
All Star Basketball	Gottlieb	January 1952	
All Stars	Williams	August 1947	
All Stars	Chicago Coin	February 1968	
Alley Cats	Williams	December 1985	
Alligator	Bally	December 1968	
Aloha	Gottlieb	December 1961	
Alpine Club	Williams	January 1965	
Al's Garage Band Goes On World Tour	Alvin G. & Co	December 1992	
The Amazing Spider-Man	Gottlieb	May 1980	
Amazon Hunt	Gottlieb	September 1983	
Amber	Williams	August 1947	
America's Most Haunted	Spooky Pinball	April 2014	
Amigo	Bally	May 1974	
Andromeda	GamePlan	September 1985	
Antar	Playmatic	November 1979	
Apache	Playmatic	1975	
Apollo	Williams	December 1967	
Apollo 13	Sega Pinball	October 1995	
Aquacade	United	May 1949	
Aqualand	Juegos Populares	February 1986	
Aquarius	Gottlieb	October 1970	
Arabian Knights	Gottlieb	November 1953	
Arcade	Williams	June 1951	
Arctic Gun	Williams	January 1967	
Arena	Premier Technology	June 1987	
Argentine	Genco	August 1941	
Argosy	Williams	September 1977	
Aristocrat	Williams	1977	
Arizona	United	May 1950	
Arrowhead	Williams	1957	
Asteroid Annie and the Aliens	Gottlieb	December 1980	
Astro	Gottlieb	October 1971	
Astro-Flite	Sega Pinball	December 1974	
Atlantis	Gottlieb	January 1975	
Atlantis	Midway	April 1989	
The Atarians	Atari	1976	
Atleta	Inder	1991	
Attack	Playmatic	December 1980	
Attack from Mars	Midway (under the Bally brand)	December 1995	
Attack from Mars (Remake)	Chicago Gaming Company	March 2017	
Attila the Hun	Game Plan	April 1984	
Austin Powers	Stern Pinball	June 2001	
Avatar	Stern Pinball	September 2010	
Avatar: The Battle for Pandora	Jersey Jack Pinball	September 2024	
Avengers	Stern Pinball	2012	
Avengers: Infinity Quest	Stern Pinball	September 2020	
Aztec	Williams	February 1976	
Baby Pac-Man	Bally	October 11, 1982	
Back to the Future the Pinball	Data East	June 1990	
Bad Cats	Williams	November 1989	
Bad Girls	Gottlieb	November 1988	
Baffle Ball	Gottlieb	November 1931	
The Bally Game Show	Midway (under the Bally brand)	April 1990	
Ballyhoo	Bally	January 1932	
Bank-A-Ball	J. F. Linck Corp.	April 1932	
Banzai Run	Williams	May 1988	
Barb Wire	Gottlieb	April 1996	
Barbarella	Talleres del Llobregat	1967	
Barnyard	Multimorphic	2017	
Barracora	Williams	September 1981	
Barry O's BBQ Challenge	American Pinball	March 2024	
Batman	Data East	July 1991	
Batman (The Dark Knight)	Stern Pinball	July 21, 2008	
Batman '66	Stern Pinball	December 2016	
Batman Forever	Sega Pinball	July 1995	
Batting Champ	Williams	May 1961	
Baywatch	Sega Pinball	February 1995	
Bazaar	Bally	October 1966	
Beach Games	Rally Play Co.	1962	
Beat the Clock	Williams	December 23, 1963	
Beat the Clock	Bally Midway	November 1985	
Beat Time	Williams	1967	
The Beatles	Stern Pinball	November 2018	
Be-Bop	Exhibit Supply Co	May 1950	
Beetlejuice	Spooky Pinball	November 2025	
Bell Ringer	Premier Technology	December 1990	
Ben-Hur	Staal Society	1977	
The Best Corsair	Europlay	1976	
Big Bang Bar	PMI	June 2007	
Big Ben	Williams	April 9, 1975	
Big Brave	Bensa	1974	
Big Brave	Gottlieb	May 1974	
Big Brave	Maresa	1974	
Big Buck Hunter	Stern Pinball	September 2009	
Big Casino	Gottlieb	July 1961	
Big Chief	Williams	September 23, 1965	
Big Daddy	Williams	September 16, 1963	
Big Day	Bally	August 1964	
Big Deal	Williams	February 7, 1963	
Big Deal	Williams	May 1977	
Big Flipper	Chicago Coin	January 1970	
Big Foot	Bally	1978	
Big Game	Stern Electronics	March 1980	
Big Guns	Williams	October 1987	
Big Hit	Gottlieb	March 1977	
Big Horse	Maresa	1975	
Big House	Gottlieb	February 1989	
Big Hunt	A.M.I.	1976	
Big Indian	Gottlieb	April 1974	
Big Inning	Bally	July 27, 1947	
Big Inning	Bally	April 22, 1958	
Big Inning (Chicago Model)	Williams	1963	
Big Inning (New York Model)	Williams	March 1963	
Big Kick	Sega Pinball	1977	
Big League	Chicago Coin	April 1965	
Big League	Williams	March 1966	
The Big Lebowski Pinball	Dutch Pinball	April 2016	
Big Shot	Gottlieb	January 1974	
Big Show	Bally	January 1974	
Big Star	Williams	September 1972	
Big Strike	Williams	August 31, 1966	
Big Together	Sega Pinball	1976	
Big Top	Gottlieb	1964	
Big Top	Wico	November 1977	
Big Town	Playmatic	April 1978	
Big Valley	Bally	May 1970	
Big Wheel	Bally	February 1968	
Bird Man	Sonic	1978	
Black Belt	Bally Midway	June 1986	
Blackbelt	Zaccaria	March 1986	
Black Fever	Playmatic	December 1980	
Black Flag	Playmatic	May 1975	
Black Gold	Williams	September 1975	
Black Hole	Gottlieb	October 1981	
Black Jack	Williams	November 1960	
Black Jack	Bally	June 1978	
Black Knight	Williams	November 1980	
Black Knight 2000	Williams	April 4, 1989	
Black Knight: Sword of Rage	Stern Pinball	March 2019	
Black Magic	Recel S.A.	June 1980	
Blackout	Williams	June 1980	
Black Pyramid	Bally Midway	July 1984	
Black & Reed	Inder	1975	
Black Rose	Midway (under the Bally brand)	July 1992	
Black Sheep Squadron	Astro Games	1979	
Black Velvet	Game Plan	May 1978	
Blackwater 100	Bally Midway	March 1988	
Blue Chip	Williams	December 1976	
Blue Max	Chicago Coin	July 1975	
Blue Note	Gottlieb	December 1978	
Blue Ribbon	Bally	July 1975	
Blues Brothers	Homepin Taiwan Co. Ltd.	March 2025	
BMX	Bally	January 1983	
Bo Bo	Williams	January 17, 1961	
Boomerang	Bally	1974	
Bonanza	Gottlieb	June 1964	
Bone Busters Inc.	Gottlieb	August 1989	
Bongo	Bally	March 1964	
Bounty Hunter	Premier Technology	July 1985	
Bow and Arrow	Bally	November 1975	
Bowl A Strike	Williams	November 23, 1965	
Bowling Flipper	Rally Play Co.	1961	
Bowling Queen	Gottlieb	July 1964	
Bowl-O	Bally	April 1970	
Boxing	Maresa	Unknown	
Bram Stoker's Dracula	Williams	April 1993	
Brave Team	Inder	1985	
Breakshot	Capcom Coin-Op	May 1996	
Bronco	Chicago Coin	November 1963	
Bronco	Gottlieb	March 1977	
Buccaneer	Gottlieb	October 1948	
Buccaneer	Gottlieb	June 1976	
Buck Rogers	Gottlieb	January 1980	
Buckaroo	Gottlieb	June 1965	
Bugs Bunny's Birthday Ball	Midway	January 1991	
Bullseye	Gottlieb	April 1994	
Bus Stop	Bally	December 1964	
Bushido	Inder	1993	
Butterfly	Sonic	November 1977	
Cactus Canyon	Midway (under the Bally brand)	October 1998	
Cactus Canyon (Remake)	Chicago Gaming Company	November 2021	
Cactus Jack's	Gottlieb	April 1991	
Caddie	Playmatic	1975	
Camel Lights	Game Plan	May 1978	
Camelot	Bally	February 1970	
Campus Queen	Bally	August 1966	
Can Can	Williams	August 1955	
Canada Dry	Gottlieb	December 1976	
Canasta	Genco	June 1950	
Canasta 86	Inder	1986	
Cannon Lagoon	Multimorphic	July 28, 2017	
Cannes	Segasa	June 1976	
Capersville	Bally	May 1966	
Capt. Card	Gottlieb	May 1974	
Capt. Fantastic and The Brown Dirt Cowboy	Bally	June 1976	
Captain Hook	Game Plan	April 1985	
Captain Kidd	Gottlieb	June 1960	
Captain Nemo	Quetzal Pinball	June 2015	
Car Hop	Gottlieb	January 1991	
Caravan	Williams	June 27, 1952	
Caravan	Playmatic	1968	
Caravelle	Williams	February 3, 1961	
Card Castle	Nordamatic	1977	
Card King	Gottlieb	August 1971	
Card Trix	Gottlieb	April 1970	
Card Whiz	Gottlieb	July 1976	
Caribbean Cruise	Gottlieb & International Concepts	1989	
Carnival	Bally	1948	
Carnival	Bally	August 1957	
Carnival	Sega	1971	
Carnival	Playmatic	May 1977	
Caribbean	Genco	1948	
Carrusel	Maresa	1966	
Casanova	Williams	November 22, 1966	
Casino	Williams	August 1958	
Casino 2000	Bill Port	1977	
Casino Royale	Segasa	1976	
Catacomb	Stern Electronics	October 1981	
Cavaleiro Negro	Taito of Brazil	1981	
Cavalier	Recel S.A.	1979	
Caveman	Gottlieb	September 1982	
Celts	Haggis Pinball	April 2021	
Centaur	Inder	1979	
Centaur	Bally	October 1981	
Centaur II	Bally	June 1983	
Centigrade 37	Gottlieb	August 1977	
Central Park	Gottlieb	April 1966	
Cerberus	Playmatic	March 1982	
Cha-Cha-Cha	Sega Pinball	1978	
Challenger	Gottlieb	March 1971	
Chamonix	Maresa	Unknown	
Champ	Midway	1963	
Champ	Bally	February 1974	
Champion	Bally	August 1939	
Champion	Nordamatic	1975	
Champion 85	Barni	1985	
The Champion Pub	Bally	April 1998	
Chance	Playmatic	September 1978	
Charlie's Angels	Gottlieb	November 1978	
Check	Recel S.A.	January 1975	
Check Mate	Recel S.A.	January 1975	
Checkpoint	Data East	February 1991	
Cheetah	Stern Electronics	June 1980	
Cherokee	Interflip S.A.	1978	
Cherry Bell	Sonic	February 1978	
Chief	Exhibit Supply Co	1939	
Chinatown	Gottlieb	October 1952	
Chuck-A-Luck	Game Plan	1978	
Cinema	Chicago Coin	March 1976	
Cine star	Zaccaria	1972	
Circa 1933	Fascination Inc.	February 1979	
Circus	Bally	November 1973	
Circus	Zaccaria	April 1977	
Circus	Brunswick	1980	
Circus	Gottlieb	June 1980	
Circus Wagon	Williams	August 1955	
Cirqus Voltaire	Midway (under the Bally brand)	October 1997	
City Slicker	Bally	March 1987	
Class of 1812	Gottlieb	August 1991	
Cleopatra	Gottlieb	December 1977	
Cleopatra	Mondialmatic	1979	
Close Encounters of the Third Kind	Gottlieb	August 1978	
Clown	Playmatic	1968	
Clown	Zaccaria	July 1985	
Clown	Inder	1988	
Club House	Williams	November 18, 1958	
Cobra	Bell Games (Nuova 11)	February 1987	
College Queens	Gottlieb	May 1969	
Combat	Zaccaria	September 1977	
Comet	Williams	June 1985	
Comics	Rally Play Co.	1968	
Competicion	Petaco.	Unknown	
Congo	Williams	November 1995	
Conquest	Exhibit	November 1939	
Conquest 200	Playmatic	1976	
Contact	Williams	1932	
Contact	Williams	May 1978	
Continental Cafe	Gottlieb	July 1957	
Coquette	Williams	May 1962	
Corsario	Inder	1989	
Corvette	Bally	August 1994	
Cosmic	Taito of Brazil	1980	
Cosmic Carnival	Suncoast Pinball	July 2019	
Cosmic Cart Racing	Multimorphic	June 2018	
Cosmic Flash	Bell Games (Nuova 11) & NSM	1984	
Cosmic Gunfight	Williams	June 1982	
Cosmic Pinball	(Briarwood) Brunswick	February 1977	
Cosmic Princess	(Allied Leisure Industries)	August 1979	
Cosmic Wars	Coffee Mat	1978	
Cosmodrome	Bell Games (Nuova 11)	1980	
Cosmos	Bally	January 1969	
Count-Down	Gottlieb	April 1979	
Counterforce	Gottlieb	August 1980	
Cowboy	Chicago Coin	1970	
Cowboy Eight Ball	Taito of Brazil	1982	
Crazy Clock	Sega Pinball	1976	
Crazy Race	Recel S.A.	January 1978	
Creature from the Black Lagoon	Midway (under the Bally brand)	December 1992	
Crescendo	Gottlieb	May 1970	
Criss Cross	Gottlieb	1958	
Criterium 75	Recel S.A.	April 1975	
Crocket	Giorgio Massiniero	1976	
Cross Country	Bally	March 1963	
Cross Town	Gottlieb	October 1966	
Crossword	Williams	April 25, 1959	
Crown Soccer Special	Taito	July 1967	
CSI: Crime Scene Investigation	Stern Pinball	November 2008	
Cue	Stern Electronics	1982	
Cue Ball Wizard	Premier Technology	October 1992	
Curling	Rally Play Co.	1965	
Cybernaut	Bally Midway	May 1985	
Cyclone	Williams	April 1947	
Cyclone	Williams	February 1988	
Cyclopes	Game Plan	October 1985	
Daffy Derby	Williams	June 1954	
Daisy May	Gottlieb	June 1954	
Dakar	Mr. Game	June 1988	
Dakota	Maresa	1972	
Dakota II	Maresa	1975	
Dale Jr.	Stern Pinball	2007	
Dancing Dolls	Gottlieb	May 1960	
Dancing Lady	Gottlieb	November 1966	
Dardos	Maresa	Unknown	
Dark Shadow	Bell Games (Nuova 11)	1986	
Darts	Williams	June 13, 1960	
Deadpool	Stern Pinball	August 2018	
Deadly Weapon	Premier Technology	September 1990	
Dealer	Williams	December 1953	
Dealer's Choice	Williams	March 1974	
Defender	Williams	December 1982	
Delta Queen	Bally	July 1974	
Deluxe Jumbo/Super Jumbo	Gottlieb	October 1954	
Deluxe Batting Champ	Williams	April 1961	
Deluxe Official Baseball	Williams	February 1960	
Deluxe Pinch-Hitter	Williams	April 1959	
Demolition Man	Williams	February 1994	
Derby Day	Gottlieb	April 1956	
Devil Riders	Zaccaria	April 1984	
Devil's Dare	Gottlieb	August 1982	
Dialed In!	Jersey Jack Pinball	August 2017	
Diamond Jack	Gottlieb	April 1967	
Diamond Lady	Gottlieb	February 1988	
Diamond Lill	Gottlieb	December 1954	
Dimension	Gottlieb	February 1971	
Diner	Williams	September 1990	
Dirty Harry	Williams	March 1995	
Disco	Stern Electronics	June 1977	
Disco Fever	Williams	August 1978	
Dixie	Chicago Coin	August 19, 1940	
Dixieland	Bally	April 1968	
Doctor Who	Midway	September 1992	
Dodge City	Gottlieb	July 1965	
Dogies	Bally	January 1968	
Dolly Parton	Bally	November 1979	
Domino	Gottlieb	September 1968	
Domino's Spectacular Pinball Adventure	Spooky Pinball	July 2016	
Don Quijote	Recel	1970s-1980s (estimated)	
Dona Elvira 2	Petaco	1996	
Double Action	Gottlieb	July 1958	
Double Barrel	Williams	August 11, 1961	
Double-Feature	Gottlieb	December 1950	
Double Play	Williams	April 1965	
Double-Shuffle	Hercules Novelty Co.	April 1932	
Double-Shuffle	Gottlieb	June 1949	
Dr. Dude and His Excellent Ray	Midway	November 1990	
Dracula	Stern Electronics	January 1979	
Dragon	Interflip S.A.	December 1977	
Dragon	Gottlieb	October 1978	
Dragonette	Gottlieb	June 1954	
Dragonfist	Stern Electronics	November 1981	
Drakor	Taito of Brazil	1979	
Drop-A-Card	Gottlieb	November 1971	
Ducks	Playmatic	1975	
Duette	Gottlieb	April 1955	
Dune	Barrels of Fun	April 2025	
Dungeons & Dragons	Bally	October 1987	
Dungeons & Dragons: The Tyrant’s Eye	Stern Pinball	January 2025	
Duotron	Gottlieb	September 1974	
Eager Beaver	Williams	April 9, 1965	
Earth Wind Fire	Zaccaria	April 1981	
Earthshaker!	Williams	February 1989	
Eight Ball	Bally	September 1977	
Eight Ball Deluxe	Bally	April 1981	
Eight Ball Champ	Bally Midway	August 1985	
El Dorado	Gottlieb	April 1975	
El Dorado City of Gold	Gottlieb	September 1984	
El Toro	Williams	August 5, 1963	
Elektra	Bally	December 1981	
Elton John	Jersey Jack Pinball	October 2023	
Elvira's House of Horrors	Stern Pinball	September 2019	
Elvira and the Party Monsters	Midway	October 1989	
Elvis	Stern Pinball	August 2004	
Embryon	Bally	June 1981	
The Empire Strikes Back	Hankin	June 1980	
Escape from the Lost World	Bally Midway	January 1988	
Evel Knievel	Bally	January 1977	
Evil Dead	Spooky Pinball	November 2024	
Evil Fight	Playmatic	March 1980	
Excalibur	Gottlieb	November 1988	
Expo	Williams	October 21, 1969	
Extra Inning	Gottlieb	May 1971	
Eye of the Tiger	Gottlieb	May 1978	
F-14 Tomcat	Williams	March 1987	
Faces	Sonic	December 1976	
Fairy	Playmatic	September 1975	
Fallout	Stern Pinball	September 2026	
Family Guy	Stern Pinball	2007	
Fan-Tas-Tic	Williams	September 26, 1972	
Fandango	Playmatic	May 1976	
Fans	Maresa	Unknown	
Fantastic World	Peyper SA	1985	
Fantasy	Playmatic	January 1976	
Far Out	Gottlieb	December 1974	
Farfalla	Zaccaria	September 1983	
Fast Draw	Gottlieb	April 1975	
Fathom	Bally	August 1981	
Fathom Revisited	Haggis Pinball	December 2022	
The Fiery 30's	Recel S.A.	1974	
Fiesta	Williams	December 9, 1959	
Fiesta	Playmatic	June 1976	
Fifteen	Inder	1974	
Final Resistance	Multimorphic	2023	
Fire Action	Taito of Brazil	1980	
Fire Action De Luxe	Taito of Brazil	1983	
Fire Cracker	Chicago Coin	October 1963	
Firecracker	Bally	February 1971	
Fire Mountain	Zaccaria	January 1980	
Fire Queen	Gottlieb	November 1977	
Fire!	Williams	August 1987	
Fireball	Bally	February 1972	
Fireball II	Bally	June 1981	
Fireball Classic	Bally Midway	February 1985	
Firepower	Williams	February 1980	
Firepower II	Williams	August 1983	
First Toon To The Moon	Skee-Ball	March 1994	
Fish Tales	Williams	October 1992	
Five Star Final	Gottlieb	May 1932	
Flash	Williams	1979	
Flash Dragon	Playmatic	1986	
Flash Gordon	Bally	February 1981	
Flight 2000	Stern Electronics	August 1980	
The Flintstones	Williams	July 1994	
Flip IV	Inder	1990	
Flip a Card	Gottlieb	February 1970	
Flip Flop	Bally	January 1976	
Flipper	Gottlieb	November 1960	
Flipper	Recel	1970s-1980s (estimated)	
Flipper Clown	Gottlieb	March 1962	
Flipper Cowboy	Gottlieb	October 1962	
Flipper Fair	Gottlieb	October 1961	
Flipper Football	Capcom Coin-Op	October 1996	
Flipper Foxtrot Rhythm Explosion	Multimorphic	2022	
Flipper Parade	Gottlieb	May 1961	
Flipper Pool	Gottlieb	October 1965	
Flush	Maresa	Unknown	
Flying Aces	Genco	July 7, 1958	
Flying Carpet	Gottlieb	January 1972	
Flying Chariots	Gottlieb	November 1963	
Flying Circus	Gottlieb	June 1961	
Foo Fighters	Stern Pinball	March 2023	
Football	Taito of Brazil	March 1979	
Force II	Gottlieb	February 1981	
Four Million B.C.	Bally	May 1971	
Frank Thomas' Big Hurt	Gottlieb	June 1995	
Freddy A Nightmare on Elm Street	Premier Technology	October 1994	
Free Fall	Gottlieb	October 1974	
Freedom	Bally	July 1976	
Freefall	Stern Electronics	January 1981	
Frontier	Bally	November 1980	
Full Throttle	Heighway Pinball	June 2015	
Fun Fair	Gottlieb	June 1968	
Fun House	Williams	August 28, 1956	
Fun Land	Gottlieb	May 1968	
FunHouse	Williams	November 1990	
Future Spa	Bally	December 1979	
Future World	Zaccaria	October 1978	
Galaxy	Bally	June 1978	
Galaxy	Stern Electronics	January 1980	
Galactic Tank Force	American Pinball	March 2023	
Game of Thrones	Stern Pinball	October 2015	
The Game	Recel	1970s-1980s (estimated)	
The Games	Mylstar	August 1984	
Gator	Bally	June 1969	
Geisha	Playmatic	1973	
Gemini	Gottlieb	October 1978	
Gemini 2000	Taito of Brazil	1982	
Genesis	Gottlieb	September 1986	
Genie	Gottlieb	October 1979	
The Getaway: High Speed II	Williams	February 2, 1992	
Ghostbusters	Stern Pinball	May 2016	
Gigi	Gottlieb	December 1963	
Gilligan's Island	Midway	May 1991	
Gladiators	Gottlieb	November 1993	
The Godfather	Jersey Jack Pinball	March 2023	
Godzilla	Sega Pinball	August 1998	
Godzilla	Stern Pinball	September 2021	
Goin' Nuts	Gottlieb	Unreleased; planned for February 1983	
Gold Ball	Bally Midway	October 1983	
Gold Rush	Bally	April 1966	
Gold Rush	Williams	April 27, 1971	
Gold Wings	Gottlieb	October 1986	
Golden Arrow	Gottlieb	October 1977	
Golden Cue	Sega Pinball	June 1998	
GoldenEye	Sega Pinball	March 1996	
Gorgar	Williams	December 1979	
Gork	Taito of Brazil	Unknown	
Granada	Williams	March 13, 1972	
Grand Champion	Williams	August 18, 1953	
Grand Lizard	Williams	April 1986	
Grand Prix	Williams	December 15, 1976	
Grand Prix (Note: Same game was released as Grand Prix in International markets and as NASCAR in North America)	Stern Pinball	2005	
Grand Slam	Bally Midway	March 1983	
Grand Slam	Gottlieb	July 1972	
Grand Slam Rally	Multimorphic	2018	
Granny and the Gators	Bally Midway	January 1984	
Gridiron	Gottlieb	December 1977	
Ground Shaker	American Home Entertainment	Unknown	
Guardians of the Galaxy	Stern Pinball	October 2017	
Gulfstream	Williams	May 24, 1973	
Gunner	Playmatic	1974	
Guns N' Roses	Data East	June 20, 1994	
Guns N' Roses	Jersey Jack Pinball	October 2020	
Halloween	Spooky Pinball	July 2021	
Hang Glider	Bally	December 1976	
Hardbody	Bally Midway	April 1987	
Harem	Playmatic	1974	
Harlem Globetrotters On Tour	Bally	September 1979	
Harley-Davidson	Midway (under the Bally brand)	February 1991	
Harley-Davidson	Sega Pinball / Stern Pinball	September 1999	
Harry Potter	Jersey Jack Pinball	June 2025	
Haunted House	Gottlieb	June 1982	
Hawkman	Taito	1983	
Heads Up!	Multimorphic	2021	
Hearts Gain	Inder	1971	
Heavy Metal Meltdown	Bally Midway	August 1987	
Hee Haw	Chicago Coin	March 1973	
Heist	Multimorphic	2020	
Hercules	Atari	May 1979	
Hi-Deal	Bally	October 1975	
Hi-Lo Ace	Bally	October 1973	
High Roller Casino	Stern Pinball	January 2001	
High Speed	Williams	January 1986	
Hit Line	Playmatic	1969	
Hit the Deck	Gottlieb	August 1978	
The Hobbit	Jersey Jack Pinball	March 2016	
Hokus Pokus	Bally	March 1976	
Hollywood Driving Range	Williams	April 1965	
Hollywood Heat	Gottlieb	June 1986	
Hook	Data East	January 30, 1992	
Hoopin' It Up	Multimorphic	2019	
Hoops	Gottlieb	1991	
Hot & Cold	Inder	1978	
Hot Ball	Taito of Brazil	1979	
Hot Hand	Stern Electronics	May 1979	
Hot Shot	Gottlieb	September 1973	
Hot Shots	Premier Technology	April 1989	
Hot Wheels	Zaccaria	September 1979	
Hot Wheels	American Pinball	June 2020	
Hotdoggin'	Bally	July 1980	
Houdini: Master of Mystery	American Pinball	December 2017	
House of Diamonds	Zaccaria	July 1978	
Humpty Dumpty	Gottlieb	October 25, 1947	
Hurricane	Williams	August 1991	
Hyperball (hybrid game)	Williams	December 1981	
Icarus	Recel S.A.	September 1977	
Ice Fever	Premier Technology	February 1985	
The Incredible Hulk	Gottlieb	October 1979	
Independence Day	Sega Pinball	July 1996	
Indiana Jones	Stern Pinball	April 2008	
Indiana Jones: The Pinball Adventure	Williams	August 1993	
Indianapolis 500	Midway (under the Bally brand)	June 1995	
Io Moon	Petaco	1996	
Iron Maiden	Stern Electronics	January 1982	
Iron Maiden	Stern Pinball	March 2018	
Iron Man	Stern Pinball	April 2010	
Jack In The Box	Gottlieb	February 1973	
Jack-Bot	Williams	October 1995	
Jacks Open	Gottlieb	January 1977	
Jacks to Open	Mylstar	May 1984	
James Bond 007	Gottlieb	October 1980	
James Bond 007	Stern Pinball	September 2022	
James Bond 007 60th Anniversary Limited Edition	Stern Pinball	December 2022	
Jaws	Stern Pinball	January 3, 2024	
Jet Spin	Gottlieb	August 1977	
The Jetsons	Spooky Pinball	February 2017	
Jim Henson's Labyrinth	Barrels of Fun	October 2023	
Jive Time	Williams	April 29, 1970	
John Wick	Stern Pinball	May 7, 2024	
Johnny Mnemonic	Williams	August 8, 1995	
Joker	Playmatic	January 1974	
Joker Poker	Gottlieb	June 1978	
Jokerz!	Williams	December 1988	
Jolly Park	Spinball S.A.L.	1996	
Jolly Ride	Playmatic	January 1974	
Joust	Bally	September 1969	
Joust	Williams	1982	
Judge Dredd	Midway (under the Bally brand)	September 1993	
Jumping Jack	Gottlieb	May 1973	
Jungle Lord	Williams	February 1981	
Jungle Princess	Gottlieb	August 1977	
Jungle Queen	Gottlieb	July 1977	
Junk Yard	Williams	December 1996	
Jurassic Park	Data East	April 26, 1993	
Jurassic Park	Stern Pinball	July 2019	
Jurassic Park Home Game	Stern Pinball	October 2021	
Kansas	Maresa	Unknown	
Keops	Inder	January 1976	
Kick Off	Bally	May 1975	
King Ball	Maresa	1965	
King Kong: Myth of Terror Island	Stern Pinball	May 2025	
King Kool	Gottlieb	July 1972	
King of Diamonds	Gottlieb	February 1967	
King Pin	Williams	September 7, 1962	
King Pin	Gottlieb	November 1973	
King Pin	Maresa	1974	
Kingpin	Capcom Coin-Op	December 1996	
Kings & Queens	Gottlieb	March 1965	
Kings of Steel	Bally Midway	March 1984	
Kiss	Bally	June 1979	
Kiss	Stern Pinball	May 2015	
Klondike	Williams	August 23, 1971	
Knock Out	Gottlieb	December 1950	
Knockout	Bally	April 1975	
Krull	Gottlieb	February 1983	
Kuwait	Maresa	Unknown	
KZ-26	Playmatic	1984	
La Escalera de Color	Petaco	1965	
Lady Luck	Williams	March 1968	
Lady Luck	Recel S.A.	November 1976	
Lady Luck	Bally Midway	March 1986	
Lady Luck	Taito of Brazil	Unknown	
Lady Robin Hood	Gottlieb	January 1948	
Lap By Lap	Inder	1986	
Laramie	Maresa	1976	
Laser Ball	Williams	December 1979	
Laser Cue	Williams	February 1984	
Laser War	Data East	May 1987	
Last Action Hero	Data East	August 9, 1993	
Last Lap	Playmatic	September 1978	
Laura	Williams	November 1945	
Lectronamo	Stern Electronics	August 1978	
Led Zeppelin	Stern Pinball	December 2020	
Legends of Valhalla	American Pinball	October 2021	
Lethal Weapon 3	Data East	June 1992	
Lexy Lightspeed: Escape from Earth	Multimorphic	July 2017	
Lexy Lightspeed: Secret Agent Showdown	Multimorphic	2017	
Lightning	Stern Electronics	March 1981	
Lights...Camera...Action!	Gottlieb	December 1989	
Locomotion	Zaccaria	September 1981	
Looney Tunes	Spooky Pinball	December 2023	
Loop the Loop	Bally	September 1966	
The Lord of the Rings	Stern Pinball	December 2003	
Lost in Space	Sega Pinball	May 1998	
Lost World	Bally	August 1978	
The Lost World: Jurassic Park	Sega Pinball	June 6, 1997	
Lucky Smile	Inder	1976	
Lucky Fruit	Zaccaria	1975	
Lucky Hand	Gottlieb	June 1977	
Lucky Strike	Williams	August 20, 1965	
Lucky Strike	Gottlieb	November 1975	
Lunelle	Taito of Brazil	Unknown	
Macao	Elettrocoin	1968	
Mach 2.0 Two	Spinball S.A.L.	1995	
The Machine: Bride of Pin-Bot	Williams	February 1991	
Mad Race	Playmatic	1985	
The Mafia	Team Pinball	July 2018	
Magic	Stern Electronics	August 1979	
Magic Castle	Zaccaria	September 1984	
Magic City	Williams	January 1967	
Magic Girl	Zidware/American Pinball	2016	
Magic Town	Williams	February 10, 1967	
Magnotron	Gottlieb	August 1974	
Mandalorian	Stern Pinball	May 2021	
Mario Andretti	Premier Technology	December 1995	
Mars God of War	Gottlieb	March 1981	
Mars Trek	Sonic	August 1977	
Mary Shelley's Frankenstein	Sega Pinball	January 1995	
Mata Hari	Bally	May 1977	
Maverick The Movie	Data East	September 25, 1994	
Medieval Madness	Williams	June 1997	
Medieval Madness (Remake)	Chicago Gaming Company	March 2015	
Medusa	Bally	September 1981	
Megaaton	Playmatic	April 1984	
Memory Lane	Stern Electronics	June 1978	
Merlin's Arcade	Turner Pinball	March 2025	
Metal Man	Inder	1992	
Metallica	Stern Pinball	2013	
Meteor	Stern Electronics	September 1979	
Metropolis	Maresa	1978	
Mexico 86	Zaccaria	July 1986	
Middle Earth	Atari	February 1978	
Mike Bossy the Scoring Machine	Game Plan	January 1982 (protoype only)	
Millionaire	Sega	July 1977	
Mini Cycle	Gottlieb	February 1970	
Miss Universo	Inder	January 1970	
Miss-O	Williams	February 25, 1969	
Monaco	Segasa	July 1977	
Monday Night Football	Data East	September 1989	
Monopoly	Stern Pinball	September 2001	
Monster Bash	Williams	July 1998	
Monster Bash (Remake)	Chicago Gaming Company	October 2018	
Monte Carlo	Bally	March 1973	
Monte Carlo	Premier Technology	February 1987	
Moon Flight	Zaccaria	October 1976	
Moon Light	Inder	January 1987	
Moon Shot	Bally	February 1963	
Motordome	Bally Midway	June 1986	
Motor Show	Mr. Game	June 1989	
Mousin' Around!	Midway (under the Bally brand)	December 1989	
Mr. & Mrs. Pac-Man	Bally	April 1982	
Mr. Black	Taito	January 1984	
Mr. Doom	Recel	1979	
Mundial 90	Inder	1990	
Munsters	Stern Pinball	January 2019	
Music-Hall	Maresa	1968	
Mustang	Chicago Coin	July 1964	
Mustang	Gottlieb	May 1977	
Mustang	Stern Pinball	April 2014	
Mystery Castle	Alvin G. & Co	September 1993	
Mystic	Bally	June 1980	
Mystic Star	Zaccaria	January 1986	
Nairobi	Maresa	1966	
NASCAR	Stern Pinball	August 1, 2005	
Nautilus	Zaccaria	February 1977	
Nautilus	Playmatic	January 1984	
NBA	Stern Pinball	May 2009	
NBA Fastbreak	Midway	March 1997	
Neptune	Gottlieb	April 1978	
New Canasta	MarsaPlay	April 2010	
New Star's Phoenix	Zaccaria	August 1987	
New World	Playmatic	October 1976	
NFL (Note: Based on the soccer themed machine Striker Xtreme)	Stern Pinball	November 2001	
Night Rider	Bally	November 1976	
Nine Ball	Stern Electronics	December 1980	
Ninja Eclipse	Turner Pinball	March 2024	
Nip-It	Bally	July 1973	
Nippy	Chicago Coin	October 1929	
Nitro Ground Shaker	Bally	January 1980	
No Fear: Dangerous Sports	Williams	May 1995	
No Good Gofers	Williams	December 1997	
Nudge-It	Premier Technology	December 1990	
Nugent	Stern Electronics	November 1978	
Odds & Evens	Bally	March 1973	
Oktoberfest: Pinball on Tap	American Pinball	October 2018	
Old Chicago	Bally	April 1976	
Old Coney Island!	Game Plan	November 1979	
Olympics	Gottlieb	September 1962	
On Beam	Bally	August 1969	
Op-Pop-Pop	Bally	April 1969	
Operation: Thunder	Premier Technology	March 1992	
Orbitor 1	Stern Electronics	February 1982	
Out of Sight	Gottlieb	December 1974	
Outer Space	Gottlieb	February 1972	
OXO	Williams	October 30, 1973	
The Pabst Can Crusher	Stern Pinball	July 2016	
Paddock	Williams	September 12, 1969	
Panthera	Gottlieb	June 1980	
Paragon	Bally	June 1979	
Party	Playmatic	May 1979	
Party Animal	Bally Midway	May 1988	
The Party Zone	Midway	August 1991	
Pat Hand	Williams	May 7, 1975	
Phantom	Pacific Manufacturing Corporation	July 1937	
The Phantom of the Opera	Data East	January 1990	
Phoenix	Williams	November 1978	
Picnic	Gottlieb	April 1958	
Pim Pam Pum	Maresa	1966	
Pin	Maresa	Unknown	
Pinball	Bell Games	February 1983	
Pinball Champ	Zaccaria	April 1983	
Pinball Champ '82	Zaccaria	April 1982	
Pinball Lizard	GamePlan	June 1980	
Pinball Magic	Capcom Coin-Op	October 1995	
Pinball Pool	Gottlieb	June 1979	
Pin-Bot	Williams	October 1986	
Pink Panther	Gottlieb	March 1981	
Pioneer	Gottlieb	March 1976	
Pinball	Stern Electronics	September 1977	
Pirates of the Caribbean	Stern Pinball	July 2006	
Pirates of the Caribbean	Jersey Jack Pinball	2018	
Pistol Poker	Alvin G. & Co	November 1993	
Play Time	Playmatic	January 1973	
Play-Boy	Gottlieb	February 1932	
Playboy	Rally Play Company	November 1967	
Playboy	Bally	December 1978	
Playboy	Stern Pinball	January 2002	
Playboy 35th Anniversary	Data East	May 1989	
Poker	Playmatic	1969	
Poker Plus	Recel S.A.	January 1977	
Polar Explorer	Taito of Brazil	Unknown	
Pole Position	Sonic	1987	
Police Force	Williams	August 1989	
Pool Champion	Zaccaria	December 1985	
Pool Sharks	Midway (under the Bally brand)	June 1990	
Popeye Saves the Earth	Midway (under the Bally brand)	February 1994	
Portal	Multimorphic	March 2025	
Predator	Pinball Brothers	June 2025	
Primus	Stern Pinball	March 2018	
The Princess Bride	Multimorphic	February 2024	
Pro-Football	Gottlieb	February 1973	
Prospector	Sonic	March 1977	
Pulp Fiction	Chicago Gaming Company	March 2023	
Punchy the Clown	Alvin G. & Co	September 1993	
Punk!	Gottlieb	December 1982	
Pyramid	Gottlieb	February 1978	
Quarterback	Bally	September 1976	
Queen	Pinball Brothers	July 2022	
Queen's Castle	Zaccaria	April 1978	
Quicksilver	Stern Electronics	June 1980	
Q*bert's Quest	Gottlieb	March 1983	
Racers	Playmatic	January 1968	
Rack 'Em Up!	Mylstar	November 1983	
Radical!	Midway (under the Bally brand)	September 1990	
The Raid	Playmatic	January 1984	
Rally	Taito of Brazil	1980	
Ranger in the Ruins	Multimorphic	2020	
Raven	Premier Technology	March 1986	
Rawhide	Chicago Coin / Stern Electronics	February 1977	
Ready...Aim...Fire!	Mylstar	November 1983	
Red & Ted's Road Show	Williams	October 1994	
Red Show	Zaccaria	January 1975	
Reggio	Maresa	1972	
Rescue 911	Premier Technology	May 1994	
Revenge from Mars	Midway (under the Bally brand)	1999	
Rey de Diamantes	Petaco	Unknown	
Rick and Morty	Spooky Pinball	2020	
Rio	Playmatic	June 1977	
Ripley's Believe It or Not!	Stern Pinball	March 18, 2004	
Riverboat Gambler	Williams	November 1990	
Road Kings	Williams	July 1986	
Road Race	Gottlieb	December 1969	
Rob Zombie's Spookshow International	Spooky Pinball	February 2016	
Robin Hood	Playmatic	Unknown	
RoboCop	Data East	November 1989	
Robot	Zaccaria	January 1985	
Robo-War	Premier Technology	April 1988	
Rock	Premier Technology	October 1985	
Rock 2500	Playmatic	January 1985	
Rocket III	Bally	April 1967	
RockMakers	Bally	August 1968	
Rocky	Gottlieb	September 1982	
ROCS	Multimorphic	2020	
Roller Coaster	Gottlieb	June 1971	
Roller Coaster	Maresa	1973	
Roller Disco	Gottlieb	1980	
RollerCoaster Tycoon	Stern Pinball	August 2002	
Rollergames	Williams	June 1990	
Rolling Stones	Bally	May 1980	
Rolling Stones	Stern Pinball	February 2011	
Roman Victory	Taito of Brazil	Unknown	
Rompeolas	Maresa	Unknown	
Royal Flush	Gottlieb	May 1957	
Royal Flush	Gottlieb	May 1976	
Royal Flush Deluxe	Gottlieb	June 1983	
Running Horse	Inder	January 1976	
Rush	Stern Pinball	January 2022	
Safari	Bally	May 1968	
Safe Cracker	Midway (under the Bally brand)	March 1996	
Satin Doll	Williams	March 12, 1975	
Scared Stiff	Midway (under the Bally brand)	September 1996	
Scooby-Doo	Spooky Pinball	March 2023	
Scorpion	Williams	July 1980	
Screech	Inder	1976	
Sea Jockeys	Williams	November 21, 1951	
Seawitch	Stern Electronics	May 1980	
Secret Service	Data East	March 1988	
Serenade	Playmatic	1969	
Serenade	Williams	May 23, 1960	
Seven Winner	Inder	1973	
The Shadow	Midway (under the Bally brand)	November 1994	
Shamrock	Inder	1977	
Shangri-La	Williams	March 21, 1967	
Shaq Attaq	Premier Technology	February 1995	
Shark	Taito of Brazil	1982	
Sharkey's Shootout	Stern Pinball	September 2000	
Sharp Shooter II	GamePlan	November 1983	
Sharpshooter	GamePlan	May 1979	
Ship Ahoy	Gottlieb	June 1976	
Shock	Taito of Brazil	Unknown	
Shoot 'n Scoot	Multimorphic	2020	
Shooting the Rapids	Zaccaria	April 1979	
Shrek	Stern Pinball	April 2008	
Silver Falls	Multimorphic	2021	
Silver Slugger	Premier Technology	February 1990	
Silverball Mania	Bally	February 1980	
The Simpsons	Data East	September 1990	
The Simpsons Pinball Party	Stern Pinball	February 14, 2003	
Sinbad	Gottlieb	February 1978	
Sir Lancelot	Peyper SA	1994	
The Six Million Dollar Man	Bally	October 1978	
Six Sticks	Bally	March 1966	
Skateball	Bally	September 1980	
Skateboard	Inder	January 1980	
Skating	Maresa	Unknown	
Skill Flight	Nuova Bell Games	September 1986	
Sky Jump	Gottlieb	May 1974	
Skylab	Williams	March 1974	
Slick Chick	Gottlieb	April 1963	
Slugfest	Williams	March 14, 1952	
SlugFest	Williams	March 1991	
Smart Set	Williams	June 12, 1969	
Snake Machine	Taito of Brazil	Unknown	
Snow Queen	Gottlieb	November 1970	
Soccer	Williams	March 23, 1964	
Soccer	Gottlieb	March 1975	
Soccer Kings	Zaccaria	September 1982	
Solar Fire	Williams	July 1981	
Solar Ride	Gottlieb	February 1979	
Sonic the Hedgehog	Jersey Jack Pinball	June 2026	
The Sopranos	Stern Pinball	February 2005	
Sorcerer	Williams	March 1985	
Sorcerer's Apprentice	Multimorphic	2021	
South Pachific	Genco	1950	
South Park	Sega Pinball	February 1999	
Space City	Zaccaria	September 1979	
Space Gambler	Playmatic	March 1978	
Space Hunt	HEXA Pinball	June 2023	
Space Invaders	Bally	April 1980	
Space Jam	Sega Pinball	December 6, 1996	
Space Mission	Williams	January 1976	
Space Odyssey	Williams	June 1976	
Space Race	Recel S.A.	April 1977	
Space Riders	Atari	September 1978	
Space Shuttle	Sega	November 1977	
Space Shuttle	Mecatronics	Unknown	
Space Shuttle	Zaccaria	September 1980	
Space Shuttle	Williams	December 1984	
Space Station	Williams	December 1987	
Space Time	Bally	September 1972	
Space Walk	Gottlieb	March 1979	
Spain 82	Playmatic	October 1982	
Spanish Eyes	Williams	March 1972	
Speakeasy	Bally	August 1982	
Special Force	Bally Midway	September 1986	
Spectrum	Bally	June 1982	
Speed Test	Taito of Brazil	Unknown	
Spider-Man	Stern Pinball	June 2007; 2016 (Reissue)	
Spin Out	Gottlieb	July 1975	
Spirit	Gottlieb	November 1982	
Spirit of 76	Gottlieb	December 1975	
The Spirit of '76	Mirco Games, Inc.	October 1975	
Spitfire	Williams	December 12, 1954	
Split Second	Stern Electronics	August 1981	
Spooky	Zaccaria	January 1987	
Spring Break	Premier Technology	April 1987	
Sprint	Bally	July 1937	
Spy Hunter	Bally Midway	October 1984	
Stampede	Stern Electronics	February 1977	
Star Explorer	Sentinel Inc.	1977	
Star Fire	Playmatic	1985	
Star Gazer	Stern Electronics	August 1980	
Star God	Zaccaria	May 1980	
Star Pool	Williams	December 5, 1974	
Star Race	Gottlieb	October 1980	
Star Trek	Gottlieb	March 1971	
Star Trek	Bally	April 1979	
Star Trek	Data East	October 1991	
Star Trek: The Next Generation	Williams	November 1993	
Star Trek	Stern Pinball	January 2013	
Star Wars	Sonic	1987	
Star Wars	Data East	October 15, 1992	
Star Wars	Stern Pinball	June 2017	
Star Wars Episode I	Williams	1999	
Star Wars: Fall of the Empire	Stern Pinball	September 2025	
Star Wars Home Edition	Stern Pinball	January 2020	
Star Wars Trilogy	Sega Pinball	March 3, 1997	
Star's Phoenix	Zaccaria	July 1987	
Stardust	Williams	October 14, 1971	
Stargate	Premier Technology	March 1995	
Stars	Stern Electronics	March 1978	
Starship Troopers	Sega Pinball	December 1997	
Stellar Wars	Williams	March 1979	
Stingray	Stern Electronics	December 1977	
Stop Ship	Playmatic	1985	
Strange Science	Bally Midway	November 1986	
Strange World	Gottlieb	February 1978	
Stranger Things	Stern Pinball	December 2019	
Street Fighter II	Premier Technology	March 1993	
Strike	Zaccaria	September 1978	
Strike Zone	Williams	September 11, 1970	
Striker	Gottlieb	November 1982	
Striker Xtreme	Stern Pinball	January 2000	
Strikes 'N Spares	Premier Technology	October 1995	
Strikes and Spares	Bally	June 1978	
Stripping Funny	Inder	1974	
Student Prince	Williams	June 17, 1968	
Sultan	Taito of Brazil	Unknown	
Super Bowl	Bell Games	January 1984	
Super Bowling	Inder	January 1974	
Super Hoop	Quetzal Pinball and Bitronic	January 2022	
Super Mario Bros.	Gottlieb	April 25, 1992	
Super Mario Bros. Mushroom World	Premier Technology	June 1992	
Super Nova	GamePlan	May 1982	
Super Orbit	Gottlieb	May 1983	
Super Soccer	Gottlieb	January 1975	
Super Spin	Gottlieb	September 1977	
Super Straight	Sonic	May 1977	
Super Win	Playmatic	1980	
Superman	Atari	March 1979	
Supersonic	Zaccaria	1977	
Supersonic	Bally	October 1979	
Supreme	Stern Pinball	2018	
Sure Shot	Gottlieb	March 1976	
Sure Shot	Taito of Brazil	1981	
Surf 'n Safari	Premier Technology	November 1991	
Surf Champ	Gottlieb	August 1976	
Surfer	Gottlieb	October 1976	
Surfers	Bally	December 1967	
Suspense	Williams	1946	
Swing Time	Williams	May 20, 1963	
Swords of Fury	Williams	June 1988	
T.K.O.	Gottlieb	March 1979	
Tag-Team Pinball	Premier Technology	September 1985	
Tahiti	Maresa	Unknown	
Tales from the Crypt	Data East	November 4, 1993	
Tales of the Arabian Nights	Williams	May 1996	
Tally-Hoo	Peyper SA	1997	
Tam-Tam	Playmatic	1975	
Target Alpha	Gottlieb	December 1976	
Target Pool	Gottlieb	June 1969	
Tasty Samba	Inder	1977	
Taxi	Williams	August 1988	
Teacher's Pet	Williams	December 16, 1965	
Team One	Gottlieb	February 1977	
Tee'd Off	Premier Technology	May 1993	
Teenage Mutant Ninja Turtles	Data East	May 1991	
Teenage Mutant Ninja Turtles	Stern Pinball	May 2020	
Ten Stars	Zaccaria	1976	
Ten-Up	Gottlieb	August 1973	
Terminator 2: Judgment Day	Williams	July 1991	
Terminator 3: Rise of the Machines	Stern Pinball	June 2003	
Texan	Gottlieb	May 1960	
The Texas Chain Saw Massacre	Spooky Pinball	December 2023	
Theatre of Magic	Midway (under the Bally brand)	March 1995	
This is Spinal Tap	Homepin Taiwan Co. Ltd.	May 2023	
Thunderbirds	Homepin Taiwan Co. Ltd.	2018	
Ticket Tac Toe	Williams	March 1996	
Time 2000	Atari	June 1977	
Time Fantasy	Williams	March 1983	
Time Line	Gottlieb	December 1980	
Time Machine	Zaccaria	April 1983	
Time Machine	Data East	December 1988	
Time Warp	Williams	September 1979	
Tiro's	Maresa	1969	
Titan	Taito of Brazil	Unknown	
Title Fight	Premier Technology	October 1990	
Tivoli	Gottlieb	July 1968	
Tivoli JR.	American Sales	February 1933	
Tokyo Perfect Drift	Quetzal Pinball and STR Pinball	December 2018	
Top Card	Gottlieb	September 1974	
Top Hand	Williams	April 26, 1966	
Top Hand	Gottlieb	May 1973	
Top Score	Gottlieb	October 1975	
Top-Secret	Maresa	1971	
Top Speed	Recel S.A.	January 1975	
Topaz	Inder	January 1979	
Torch	Gottlieb	February 1980	
Tornado	Williams	May 1947	
Torpedo Alley	Data East	August 1988	
Total Nuclear Annihilation	Spooky Pinball	October 2017	
Totem	Gottlieb	August 1979	
Touchdown	Gottlieb	October 1984	
Toy Story 4	Jersey Jack Pinball	June 2022	
Trailer	Playmatic	1985	
Transformers	Stern Pinball	2011	
Transporter the Rescue	Midway (under the Bally brand)	April 1989	
Trident	Stern Electronics	March 1979	
Trio	Bally	July 1965	
Tron: Legacy	Stern Pinball	2011	
Tropic Isle	Gottlieb	April 1962	
Tropical	Zaccaria	Unknown	
Truck Stop	Midway (under the Bally brand)	December 1988	
Twilight Zone	Midway (under the Bally brand)	April 5, 1993	
Twin Win	Bally	February 1974	
Twister	Sega Pinball	April 1996	
TX-Sector	Gottlieb	March 1988	
UFO-X	Playmatic	January 1984	
Ultraman: Kaiju Rumble!	Spooky Pinball	July 2021	
The Uncanny X-Men	Stern Pinball	September 2024	
Underwater	Recel S.A.	June 1976	
Universe	Gottlieb	October 1959	
Universe	Zaccaria	November 1977	
Up Away	Inder	January 1975	
Vacation America	Churchill	December 2003	
Vector	Bally	February 1982	
Vegas	Gottlieb	July 1990	
Vegas	Taito of Brazil	Unknown	
Venom	Stern Pinball	July 2023	
Verne's World	Spinball S.A.L.	1996	
Victory	Gottlieb	October 1987	
Viking	Bally	July 1980	
Viper	Stern Electronics	October 1981	
Viper Night Drivin'	Sega Pinball	1998	
Volcano	Gottlieb	September 1981	
Volcano	Taito of Brazil	Unknown	
Volley	Gottlieb	October 1976	
Voltan Escapes Cosmic Doom	Bally	February 1979	
Vulcan	Gottlieb	October 1977	
The Walking Dead	Stern Pinball	November 2014	
Waterworld	Gottlieb	October 1995	
Weird Al's Museum of Natural Hilarity	Multimorphic	February 2022	
Wheel	Maresa	Unknown	
Wheel of Fortune	Stern Pinball	October 2007	
Whiffle	Automatic Industries	June 1931	
Whirlwind	Williams	January 1990	
White Water	Williams	January 1993	
Who Dunnit	Midway (under the Bally brand)	September 1995	
The Who's Tommy Pinball Wizard	Data East	January 8, 1994	
Whoa Nellie! Big Juicy Melons	Stern Pinball/WhizBang Pinball	March 2015	
The Wiggler	Bally	August 1967	
Wild Card	Williams	October 1977	
Wild Fyre	Stern Electronics	October 1978	
Wild Wheels	Bally	February 1966	
Willy Wonka & The Chocolate Factory	Jersey Jack Pinball	April 2019	
Winchester Mystery House	Barrels of Fun	October 2025	
Winter Sports	Zaccaria	January 1978	
Wipe Out	Premier Technology	October 1993	
Wisconsin	United	1948	
Wizard	Bally	May 1975	
The Wizard of Oz	Jersey Jack Pinball	April 2013	
Woods Queen	Zaccaria	January 1976	
World Challenge Soccer	Premier Technology	February 1994	
World Cup '90	Mr. Game	January 1990	
World Cup Soccer	Midway (under the Bally brand)	February 1994	
World Poker Tour	Stern Pinball	February 2006	
Wrestlemania	Stern Pinball	January 2015	
WWF Royal Rumble	Data East	April 11, 1994	
X's & O's	Bally Midway	February 1984	
The X-Files	Sega Pinball	September 9, 1997	
X-Men	Stern Pinball	2012	
Xenon	Bally	November 1980	
Yale	Inder	1974	
Ye-Ye Club	Maresa	1966	
Yukon	Williams	August 23, 1971	
Yukon Yeti	Turner Pinball	March 2026	
Zankor	Zaccaria	December 1986	
Zarza	Taito of Brazil	1982	
Zig Zag	Williams	December 14, 1964	
Zip-A-Doo	Bally	August 1970	
Zira	Playmatic	January 1980	
Zodiac	Williams	August 23, 1971	

== See also ==
- List of pinball manufacturers
- Glossary of pinball terms
- List of arcade video games
