= List of pinball manufacturers =

This is a partial list of pinball manufacturers of past and present organized alphabetically by name. The article only includes producers of pinball machines at least in a small series which excludes makers of single unit custom pinball machines.

== Present ==
- American Pinball (founded 2015)
- Barrels of Fun (founded 2021)
- Chicago Gaming Company (founded 2001)
- Dutch Pinball (founded 2010)
- Hexa Pinball (founded 2023)
- Homepin Taiwan Co. Ltd. (founded 2013)
- Jersey Jack Pinball (founded 2011)
- Multimorphic Inc (founded 2009)
- Pawlowski Pinball (founded 2023)
- Pedretti Gaming (founded 1976; pinball manufacturing 2024)
  - Euro Pinball Corp (a co-venture with Pinball Brothers that manufactures their machines; founded 2023)
- Phenix Pinball (founded 2018)
- Pinball Adventures (founded 2018)
- Pinball Brothers (founded 2018)
  - Euro Pinball Corp (a co-venture with Pedretti Gaming that manufactures their machines; founded 2023)
- Quetzal Pinball (founded 2012)
- Spooky Pinball (founded 2013)
- Stern Pinball (founded 1999)
  - As DataEast (1986-1994)
  - As Sega Pinball (1994-1999)
- Team Pinball (founded 2018)
- TiltBob Pinball (founded 2023)
- Turner Pinball (founded 2022)
- Vector Pinball (founded 2022)
- Wonderland Amusements (founded 2024)

== Past ==
- A. Hankin & Company (1978-1980)
- Allied Leisure
- Alvin G & Co. (1991-1994)
- Astro Games
- Atari (pinball manufacturing 1976-1979)
- Automatic Industries Inc. (1931-1936)
- Bally Manufacturing (1932-1988)
- Bill Port (1976-1982)
- Capcom Coin-Op, a subsidiary of Capcom
- Centro Matic
- Coffee-Mat
- Chicago Coin (1932-1976; assets sold to Stern Electronics, Inc.)
- Data East (1986-1994; sold to Sega Pinball)
- deeproot (2015-2021) (note: no pinball machine was ever produced)
- Exhibit Supply Company (1901-1979; pinball manufacturing 1932-1957)
- Fascination Int., Inc (Allied Leisure)
- Game Plan
- Genco (1931-1958)
- Gottlieb (1927-1996)
- Haggis Pinball (2021-2024)
- Heighway Pinball (2012-2018)
- Inder (1971-1993)
- InterFlip/Recreativos Franco
- J.H. Keeney & Co.
- Jennings & Company
- Jeutel (pinball manufacturing 1982-1986)
- LTD of Brazil
- MAC S.A.
- Nordamatic
- Nuova Bell/Bell Games
- Maresa (1960-1976)
- MarsaPlay (2010-2013)
- Mirco Games
- Midway Games
- Peyper (1977-1994)
- Pinstar
- Playmatic
- Rally (sometimes known as Rally Play) (1961-1969)
- Petaco
  - As Petaco (domestic brand name) (1962-1992)
  - As Recel (international brand name) (1971-1996)
  - As Sleic (1992-1996)
- Ripepi
- Sega Pinball (1994-1999; sold to Stern Pinball)
- Sega, S.A. SONIC
- Spinball S.A.L.
- Stern Electronics (1976-1985)
- SunCoast Pinball
- Taito of Brazil (1972-1985)
- Talleres del Llobregat (estimated 1960s-1973)
- tecnoplay
- The Valley Company
- United Manufacturing
- Viza
- WhizBang Pinball (2011-2017)
- Wico
- Williams Electronics / WMS Industries (1943-1999)
- Zaccaria (1974-1988)
  - As Mr. Game (1988-1990)
- Zidware (2011-2017)

== See also ==
- List of pinball machines
- List of pinball game designers
- Glossary of pinball terms
