= Time Warp =

A time warp is an imaginary spatial distortion that allows time travel in fiction, or a hypothetical form of time dilation or contraction.

Time Warp may also refer to:

== Music ==
- "Time Warp" (song), a song and dance from The Rocky Horror Show
- Time Warp (album), a 1995 R&b/House album by Chick Corea
- "Time Warp", an R&B track that appeared as a B-side on Eddy Grant's 1983 single "Electric Avenue"
- Timewarp / Join the Dots, a 2008 single by Sub Focus

== Entertainment ==
- Time Warp (TV series), a popular science television program
- Time Warp (comics), a comic book series published by DC Comics in 1980 and 2013
- Time Warp (festival), an electronic music festival
- Time Warp (pinball), a pinball machine introduced in 1979
- The Time Warp Trio, a children's book series
  - Time Warp Trio, animated series based on the book series

== Technology ==
- Dynamic time warping, the property that the timing of a sequence of events may not be regular, addressed in computational sequence comparisons via a dynamic programming algorithm
- Asynchronous reprojection, also called time warp, in virtual reality headsets

== Other uses ==
- Time Warp (roller coaster), a roller coaster at Canada's Wonderland
