= Checkpoint (pinball) =

1991 pinball machine

- Manufacturer: Data East
- Release date: February 1991
- System: DataEast/Sega Version 3
- Design: Joe Kaminkow, Ed Cebula
- Programming: Rehman Merchant
- Artwork: Paul Faris
- Music: Brian L. Schmidt
- Sound: Brian L. Schmidt
- Production run: 3,500

Checkpoint is a 1991 pinball machine released by Data East. It featured the first dot matrix display (DMD) ever incorporated into a pinball game. For Checkpoint, Data East used a "half-height" DMD. By way of comparison, Williams later produced machines with standard DMDs that were twice the height. Checkpoint also features video mode minigames on its display.

In 2008, the Popular Mechanics website included the machine on a list of the top eight most innovative pinball machines of all time.

== Gameplay ==
The machine's gameplay centers on a ramp with a so-called Lasermatic speed detection feature that "clock" a pinball's speed by measuring the time between the ball hitting one switch and then a second, translating that time into a speed analogous to that of a racing car. The minimum is 80 MPH; a skilled player can achieve a speed upwards of 250 MPH. In addition to the customary high score list, Checkpoint also let players record their initials if they set the machine's speed record. A similar speed measuring feature already appeared in the pinball machine Vector from Bally in 1981.

Various scoring objectives can be met by achieving certain shot speeds. The game has four single-ball modes Fast, Blue Light Special, 1 million ramp/10 million ramp and Hot Nitro Round. The game also features multiball modes putting two or even three balls in play simultaneously. Checkpoint was also the first game to provide players with a choice of music before setting the first ball in motion. A player can select from among several musical styles, including Country, Rock, Jazz, Rap, Classical and Soul. One of few other example of a multiple choice music feature is Sega's Mary Shelley's Frankenstein. The novelty quickly wore off for many players, who just wanted to play the game without having to repeatedly go through the choice of the style before the start of each game.

The game features an ignition key to start the game, an auto plunger, a shaker motor that let the table rumble like a racing car and a Porsche Carrera theme with a spinning wheel in the backbox and an image of Neuschwanstein Castle in the background of the backglass. Checkpoint is one of the few pinball machines designed by DataEast that was not exclusively linked to a film or television show in this period.

== Reception ==
Play Meter found it to be a fast game, and that no location was unsuitable for it, even recommending that some locations should buy two machines.

== Impact of DMDs on pinball ==
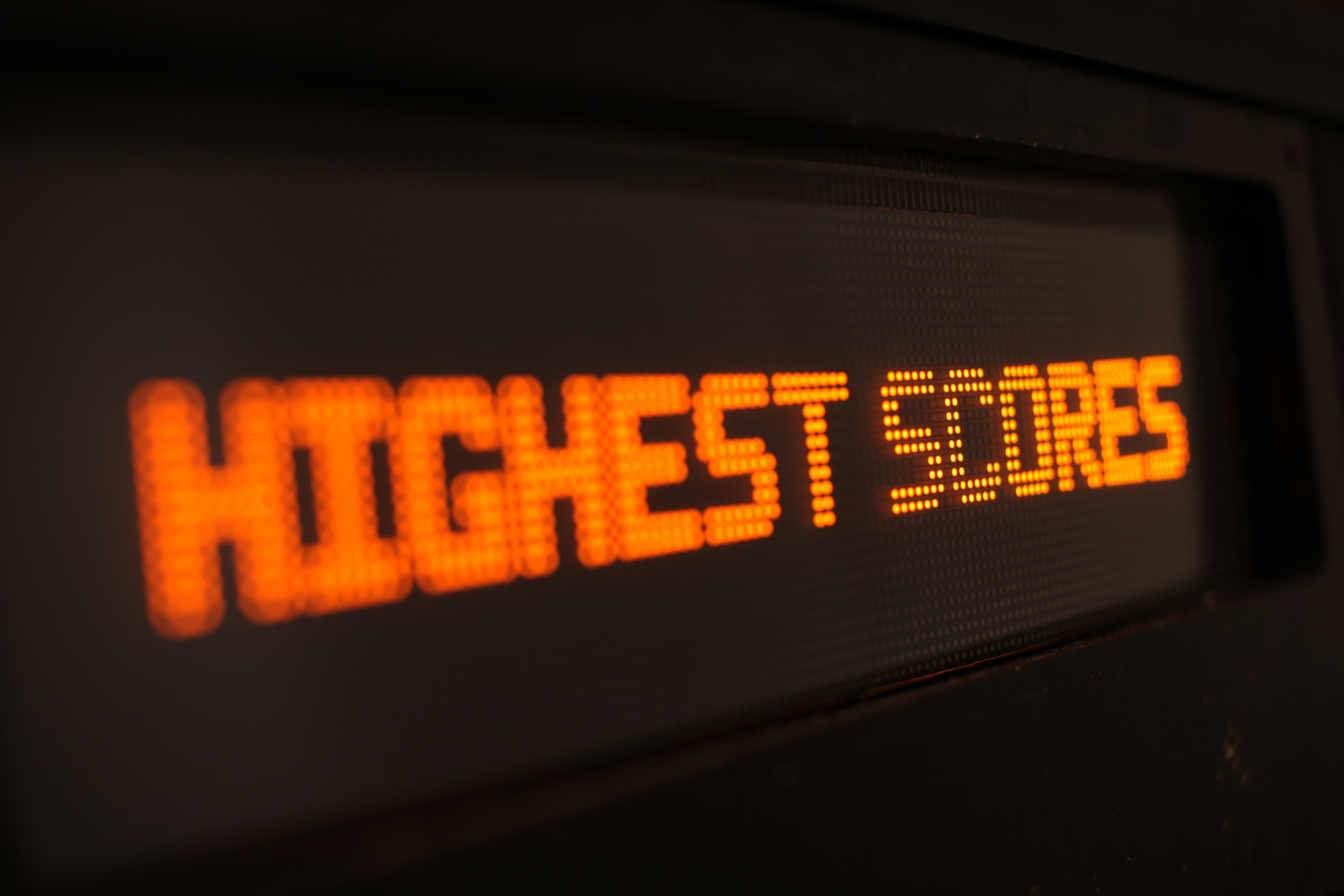
A similar but with double-height dot matrix display on the later pinball machine Demolition Man

Before the DMDs, pinball machines displayed their scores on spinning reels and, later on simple digital displays. Dot matrix displays enabled designers to provide players with more gameplay information. Graphics and animations in the back-box showed players such data as their progress during the game, the mode in which they were currently playing, and available bonuses. Home Leisure Direct's Andy Beresford, a UK game room specialist, wrote that the introduction of DMDs propelled pinball into its golden age, asserting that the games released in the 1990s were among the best ever made. He supported this claim with rating statistics from Pinside Pinball and the International Pinball database.

According to Beresford, after the video game boom and crash the interest in pinball games revived. Pinball table designers, he said, were now able to tell an actual story that gave pinball machines a more lively feel and personality. In his view, the combination of physical ball movement on a well designed playfield with the new effects took pinball to a whole new level.

DMDs on pinball machines are plasma displays, not LEDs that would be much dimmer. They consists of an individually addressable dot grid rectangular array, capable of displaying text and graphics by energizing selected dots. These displays usually use Neon gas, which glows orange when ionized by a high voltage electric current pass through the segment. A DMD on a pinball machine is usually 128 pixels wide and 32 pixels high (Checkpoint used only 16 pixels high). Designers achieved, according to Beresford, amazing effects over the years despite such limitations.

Other display innovations on pinball machines include pinball video game hybrids like Gottlieb's Caveman and Bally's Baby Pac-Man in 1982 and Bally's Granny and the Gators in 1984 and the use of a small color video monitor for scoring and minigames in the backbox of the pinball machine Dakar from manufacturer Mr. Game in 1988 and CGA color monitors in Williams' Pinball 2000 Games Star Wars Episode I: The Phantom Menace and Revenge from Mars (1999) that utilize a Pepper's Ghost technique to reflect the monitor display onto a specially designed semi-transparent glass inside the head of the machine and above the playfield.

MarsaPlay in Spain manufactured a remake of Inder's original Canasta titled New Canasta, with an LCD screen in the backbox in 2010. The first LCDs in the back box of US pinball tables were released with The Wizard of Oz in 2013. Custom pinball modifications include the use of ColorDMD to replace the standard mono color DMDs.

In 2015, the new British pinball manufacturer Heighway Pinball released the racing themed pinball machine Full Throttle. The game has its LCD screen for scores, info & animations located in the playfield surface at player’s eye view.
