= Spooky Pinball =

American pinball machine manufacturer

- Industry: Pinball
- Founded: 2013
- Founder: Charlie Emery
- Headquarters: Benton, WI, United States
- Products: Pinball machines
- Number of employees: 40 (2024)
- Website: www.spookypinball.com

Spooky Pinball is an American pinball manufacturing company, founded in Wisconsin in 2016. Their first machine was America's Most Haunted and they have since released a total of fourteen machines.

== History ==
Charlie Emery officially founded Spooky Pinball in 2013 in Benton, Wisconsin, but his work with pinball began a few years prior. In 2010, Emery began a pinball podcast called Spooky Pinball with his wife Kayte and children Morgan and Corwin "Bug". At the time, Emery had been working at a screen printing and decal company in Galena, Illinois for 20 years and wanted to create a podcast about his two interests: "spooky" monster movies and pinball. Emery combined his printing skills and pinball experience, working on a project with Bug to create a new custom Godzilla machine built off a 1983 Firepower II machine. They brought the game to the 2011 Midwest Gaming Classic, where they received positive feedback and met Benjamin "Ben Heck" Heckendorn, who encouraged Emery to expand his hobby into a business. Emery initially worked with his employer to develop direct printing for Ben Heck's custom Lost pinball playfield and later the cabinets of early Jersey Jack Pinball The Wizard of Oz machines.

In 2012, Emery opted to leave his job and start his own pinball manufacturing company. With $35,000 in savings and a loan from the Benton State Bank, Emery leased a space from the Benton Business Incubator in 2013. Kayte Emery came on as the first employee. The first design that Emery began working on was called Pinball Zombies From Beyond the Grave. However, their first machine released was America's Most Haunted in 2014. Ben Heck had begun designing a game, originally called Ghost Squad, in 2012 but did not have the facilities to produce a run of machines. With feedback from Dennis Nordmann, Heck built a prototype and coded the rules of the game. The electronics were created by Parker Dillmann from the Houston business MacroFab while pinball components came from Chicago-based Pinball Life and plastic components were 3D printed. Their first run of America's Most Haunted was 150 units, which took almost two years to sell. The first machine ever made was purchased by the Benton State Bank for the local Lawrence Pub and Eatery while the first game ever sold was bought by Joe Newhart from PinballSTAR Amusements.

Spooky Pinball's second effort was Rob Zombie's Spookshow International, released in early 2016. Emery revisited his Pinball Zombies From Beyond the Grave draft and adapted it to create the game. It included ten songs licensed from Zombie, and his wife, Sheri Moon Zombie and Sid Haig provided voices for the game. This game was also the first one to introduce "family mode" which removed swearing. A run of 300 units was announced, which sold out before production began. That same year, Spooky also released Domino's Spectacular Pinball Adventure. Adam Gacek, Vice President and General Counsel at Domino's approached the company about building a themed game to raise funds for their charity, the Domino's Partner Foundation. Gacek helped with the design, which incorporated The Noid, and the first of 150 units was revealed at Domino's World Wide Rally in Las Vegas. That year, Spooky also expanded to a separate building.

2017 saw the release of three pinball machines, Total Nuclear Annihilation, and The Jetsons, and Alice Cooper's Nightmare Castle. Total Nuclear Annihilation was independently developed by Scott Danesi, an engineer from Pinball Life. He then struck a deal with Spooky to produce a run of the machines. The Jetsons was independently developed by The Pinball Company and again manufactured and sold by Spooky. Alice Cooper's Nightmare Castle was the last of the three machines released. Ben Heck returned to design the machine before departing from Spooky until 2022.

In 2019, Spooky announced their next pinball machine, based on the television show Rick and Morty. Scoff Danesi worked with Spooky this time to design the machine and 750 units were produced in 2020. Preorders for Rick and Morty sold out before production began. In 2021, Spooky produced their largest run of machines for Halloween and Ultraman: Kaiju Rumble! The games used the same playfield and rule sets with different themes: the 1978 film Halloween and the Japanese Ultraman television series. Spooky produced 1,250 Halloween machines and 500 Ultraman machines. They sold fan memberships for $45 that allowed customers early access to preorder the machines.

In 2023, Spooky released three pinball machines, two of which were based on Warner Bros. properties. Spooky initially developed a working relationship with Warner Bros. following their licensing deal for the Rick and Morty pinball machine. They were able to get the licensing rights for both Scooby-Doo, Where Are You! and Looney Tunes as part of one contract. The first of the three new machines was announced in December, 2022. Scooby-Doo Pinball was the company's first widebody game and included original voice recordings from actors who had played the main cast. The run was limited to a maximum of 1,969 units as a nod to the year that the show came out. Next, Spooky repeated their practice of producing two differently-themed pinball machines using the same playfield and rule sets to release Loony Tunes and Texas Chainsaw Massacre. Spooky CFO Morgan Emery described Texas Chainsaw Massacre, based on the 1974 film, as "[not] the darkest thing pinball has ever seen, but it’s pretty dang close."

Spooky Pinball released their next machine in 2024, based on the first two Evil Dead films. The game is their second widebody and a run of 888 machines were produced. In October 2025, they announced their next release, a run of 999 machines based on the 1988 film Beetlejuice and costing $9,999.

== Location and facilities ==
Spooky Pinball is located in Benton a small town in southwestern Wisconsin with a population of roughly 1,000. Spooky originally leased an 1,800 square foot room in the Benton Business Incubator in 2013. The company's printing equipment served a second role, allowing Spooky to operate as a commercial sign shop. In 2016, Spooky moved to a separate 5,000 square foot building to expand their manufacturing space and had grown to nine employees.

In 2023, Morgan Emery credited the pandemic for their increased demand that increased sales and let to their expansion. By then they had moved to a new location and announced plans to double their space. A 12,000-square-foot building was to be constructed across from their current operations and serve as a new production center, while the existing space would be used for storage. The new facility was expected to open in 2024 to accommodate their 40-person staff.

== Production ==
As of 2025, Spooky Pinball has produced 14 different pinball machines. Games take approximately 18 months to develop from concept to production, including working with studios to obtain licenses for certain themes. Pinball machines are manufactured in their Benton facilities, including parts made in house and sourced from Pinball Life in Chicago. Earlier machines used PinHeck software, designed by Ben Heck with feedback from veteran pinball designer Dennis Nordman and electronics, designed and engineered in Houston by Parker Dillmann at MacroFab.

Beginning with their first machine, Spooky Pinball has 3D printed game components and has 26 printers used to produce parts. A laser cutter is also used in parts production and their large-scale printing equipment is used to produce the decals.

Machines are built assembly line style and take an estimated 20 to 40 hours to build. Beginning in 2021, Spooky began producing sets of two games with different themes but similar designs and rules to streamline production. The games are often offered in multiple versions, with additional features costing more. Spooky pinball manufactures and sells between 1,000 and 2,000 machines each year, and as of 2023 they retail for between $7.7 and $9.8 thousand.

== Games ==
Year	Title	Designer	Units Produced	Comments	Citation
2014	America's Most Haunted	Benjamin Heckendorn	150		
2016	Rob Zombie's Spookshow International	Charlie Emery	300		
2016	Domino's Spectacular Pinball Adventure	Charlie Emery and Adam Gacek	136	Designed and manufactured for Domino's	
2017	Alice Cooper's Nightmare Castle	Charlie Emery	500		
2017	Total Nuclear Annihilation	Scott Danesi	550		
2017	The Jetsons	Dan Goett and Nathan Goett	100	Designed and manufactured for The Pinball Company	
2020	Rick and Morty	Scott Danesi			
2021	Halloween	Luke Peters	1,250		
2021	Ultraman: Kaiju Rumble!	Luke Peters			
2023	Looney Tunes	Corwin Emery			
2023	The Texas Chainsaw Massacre	Luke Peters and Corwin Emery	888		
2023	Scooby-Doo	Luke Peters and Corwin Emery			
2024	Evil Dead	Luke Peters and Corwin Emery	888		
2025	Beetlejuice	Luke Peters and Corwin Emery	999		
2026	The Goonies	Luke Peters and Corwin Emery			
