= Gilligan's Island (pinball) =

1991 pinball machine

- Manufacturer: Midway
- Release date: May 1991
- System: Williams WPC (Dot Matrix)
- Design: Ward Pemberton; Dan Langlois
- Programming: Mike Boon
- Artwork: John Youssi
- Music: Jon Hey
- Sound: Jon Hey
- Production run: 4,100 (approx.)

Gilligan's Island is a Midway pinball machine (produced under the Bally name) released in May 1991. It is based on the television series of the same name and the first Williams WPC machine that was released with a high-resolution (128x32) dot matrix display (the first DMD as used in Checkpoint by Data East and released three months earlier only featured 128x16). Bob Denver supplied original speech for Willy Gilligan for the game, which also featured the theme song from the television show. Tim Kitzrow provided the voice of Thurston Howell III. Tina Louise's likeness is not featured in the game and an alternate blonde character appears on the backglass of the machine.

== Overview ==
- OBJECTIVE: The machine's game card describes the game objective as to relieve the Natives Island God, KONA. Collect all seven ingredients of the Professor's Secret Formula Lava Seltzer. Take the Lava Seltzer through the Jungle Run Trails and get it to Kona. If successful, you receive "Kona's Treasure", 50 million points!

Other objectives include:

- L-A-G-O-O-N TARGETS: Completing the lagoon targets qualifies the lagoon for random values between 150,000 and 3,000,000 points, multi-ball, bonus ball or special.
- KICKBACK:
- GIFT OF GODS: All other players collect 1 million points.
- BONUS BALLS: All bonus balls given are played at the end of the game. After 5 have been earned, however, a score bonus is given.

== Reception ==
Play Meter praised the variety of shots, and found the game captured an episode of Gilligan's Island well. They stated that it is suitable for inexperienced and experienced players alike.

RePlay noted that early location results were promising.
