= Playmatic =

Spanish pinball machine manufacturer

Playmatic was a Spanish manufacturer of pinball machines, producing approximately 63 different models between 1968 and 1987. Although American pinball manufacturers create playfields by directly painting the artwork on a wooden surface, then add a layer of varnish or clear coat, Playmatic and other European manufacturers included the artwork on a durable plastic sheet laid over the flat wooden surface, resulting in added durability of the artwork image.

== List of Playmatic Pinball Machines ==
- Antar (1979)
- Apache (1975)
- Attack (1980)
- Big Town (1978) (first Playmatic solid-state machine released April 1978)
- Black Fever (1980)
- Black Flag (1975)
- Caddie (1975)
- Caravan (1967)
- Carnival (1977)
- Cerberus (1982)
- Chance (1974)
- Chance (1978)
- Clown (1968)
- Conquest 200 (1976)
- Dixie (1980)
- Ducks (1975)
- Evil Fight (1980)
- Fairy (1975)
- Fandango (1976)
- Fantasy (1976)
- Fiesta (1976) (4-player)
- Flash Dragon (1986)
- Geisha (1973) (1- and 2-player versions of this were produced)
- Gunner (1974)
- Hangers (1977)
- Harem (1974) (4-player)
- Hit Line (1969)
- Joker (1974) (1- and 2-player versions of this were produced)
- Jolly Ride (1974) (1-, 2- and 4-player versions of this were produced)
- KZ-26 (1984)
- Last Lap (1978)
- Mad Race (1985)
- Magic (1973)
- Meg Aaton (1984)
- Nautilus (1984)
- New World (1976)
- Party (1979)
- Phantom Ship (1987)
- Play Time (1973)
- Poker (1969)
- Racers (1968)
- Rio (1977) (last electromechanical game)
- Robin Hood (1969)
- Robin Hood (1971)
- Rock 2500 (1985)
- Serenade (1969)
- Skill Flight (1987)
- Space Gambler (1978)
- Spain 82 (1982)
- Speakeasy (1972)
- Star Fire (1985)
- Stop Ship (1985)
- Super Win (1980)
- Tam-Tam (1975)
- The 30s (1977)
- The Raid (1984)
- Trailer (1985)
- UFO-X (1984)
- Viking (1970)
- Zira (1980)

== See also ==
- Zaccaria (company), a former Italian company of pinball and arcade machines
- Taito of Brazil, a former Brazilian company of pinball and arcade machines
- Inder, a former Spanish company of pinball and arcade machines
- Maresa, a former Spanish company of pinball machines
