= Benjamin Heckendorn =

American computer engineer

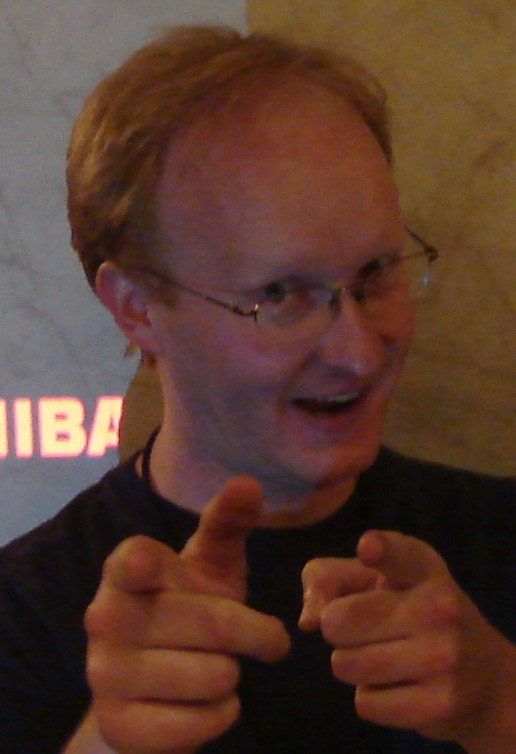
- Heckendorn at Midwest Gaming Classic 2007
- Born: October 19, 1975 (age 51); Richland Center, Wisconsin, U.S.
- Other name: Ben Heck
- Website: BenHeck.com

Benjamin J. Heckendorn (born October 19, 1975) is an American video game console modder and computer engineer. He is better known as Ben Heck on the Internet. Heckendorn is also an independent filmmaker and he was the star of element14's The Ben Heck Show, a popular online series, until leaving the show in late 2018.

He has two podcasts, one which he runs with the help of a friend, Jason Jones, and the other on Warpath.TV with George Force, Mike Zucker, and Anthony Carboni.

Most of Heckendorn's mods are done by taking apart old video game consoles such as the Atari 2600 and Nintendo Entertainment System. He then reconfigures internal printed circuit board (PCB) into a smaller form factor. The newly configured circuit board is enclosed within a custom case (done by a CNC machine) and any peripherals are assembled by Heckendorn.

His creations have been featured in such publications as Wired, Popular Science, and Maxim, and on television shows such as The Screen Savers, Attack of the Show!, and X-Play. His mods are also commonly presented in blogs such as Engadget.

== History ==
Heckendorn had an interest in electronic and video games as a child, as a young man in film-making and in later life while working as a graphic artist. He made a GeoCities site covering his project to make a portable Atari 2600, which led to an appearance in 2004 on The Screen Savers, a book deal, requests for custom electronics creations, and YouTube videos in 2010. In 2016 & 2017 he restored the only known surviving Sony/Nintendo Play Station prototype console, the Super NES CD-ROM.

== Systems ==
Heckendorn has created a line of portable Atari systems, almost always using some form of Atari 2600 board cut up into a smaller PCB. The only exception is the Atari Jaguar "64-Bit" Portable and the Atari 800 laptop. He has also turned two Atari 800 computers into laptops. One of his most notable Xbox 360 projects a mod to make the form factor more like that of a portable laptop computer. Other projects include a one-handed Xbox 360 controller built for a serviceman injured in Iraq, five revised the Xbox Laptops (one being a modified Xbox Slim), an Xbox 360 controller out of a Standard Xbox Controller and another one-handed Access Controller with modular ministicks and buttons. The latter was originally designed for PC, PS2 and PS3, but works with the Xbox 360 through an adapter.

Heckendorn has also modified an Xbox One console and five (3 NESp's) Nintendo consoles into portables. Other portables include three Sony portables, a "laptop" version of the PS3 based on the Slim version, a "PS360" controller from a PlayStation 3 controller built into an Xbox 360 controller's shell, and Commodore 64 (C model for its smaller motherboard) modded into a portable laptop computer. He created the MGDp, a fully functional PC built into an antique 18-pack MGD beer case and a NK Neo Geo MVS Portable built around an MV-1C motherboard from 1999.

Heckendorn has made a Sega Genesis portable called the Sega Exodus. Initially a Radica Genesis collection DTV unit, a cartridge slot was added to allow it to play most Sega Genesis games. Apple projects include a laptop made from an original Apple IIgs motherboard, with added RAM and a CompactFlash interface and an Apple One Replica Laptop, a custom-made replica of the Apple I. Heckendorn has made four combo system to date. His first portable combo system, the NEStari was an NES and an Atari 2600 combo. The Ultimate Combo System was an Xbox 360, a PlayStation 3, and a Wii U in a custom case. The third is an Atari 2600 / PS2 Combo Unit and the fourth is a Colecovision/Sega Master System combo with mention of adding MSX capabilities.

Heckendorn has also created custom pinball machines. Heckendorn built most of the Bill Paxton pinball machine from scratch, CNC-ing the cabinet himself and using a piece of channel for the lockdown bar. The dot matrix display was soldered by hand, and has fewer dots than a standard DMD display (128 x 32). Most of the playfield components were used early Bally parts, including the ball trough that was modified for multiball similar to what Gottlieb did by adding a solenoid and a hook to hold balls back. Overall, the theme focused on films and television series in which Bill Paxton appeared, including True Lies, U-571, Titanic, Apollo 13, Aliens, and Big Love. Heckendorn eventually decided it was taking up space, so he offered it up for sale on Pinside. Lloyd from SS Billiards ended up buying it so it can be played on location.

Lost was Heckendorn's second title, which switched to an LCD. Because of ball hangups, ultimately this design was dismantled (destroyed) and parts used for the next project, America's Most Haunted. Originally called Ghost Squad, which can still be heard during multiball, this was the first design that ended up being made commercially. The reason for the name change was because there is a Sega arcade shooter with the same name. This theme is loosely based on an episode of The Ben Heck Show which was a parody of the typical ghost hunting reality show. Chuck Emery teamed up with Heckendorn, and because AMH was further along than his own design, this would be the first title to be built by his new company, Spooky Pinball.

== Hacking Video Game Consoles ==
In February 2005, Heckendorn released his book Hacking Video Game Consoles, published by Wiley Publishing Inc. and printed under their ExtremeTech line. It contains step by step instructions for creating two Atari 2600 portables, two NES portables, two SNES portables, and two PlayStation portables, each in hand-built and CNC-cut designs.

== Podcast website ==
On December 13, 2006, Heckendorn started benheckpodcast.com, a website for storing all of his podcasts. In addition, posts are made detailing all the projects he is currently working and the projects he has worked on in the past.

Heckendorn's other podcast is entitled Sonic Boom, and is available on the Warpath.TV digital network. This podcast is no longer in production.

== Movies ==
Heckendorn is also an amateur film maker. He has completed 6 films since 1995, including his comedic love story, Port Washington, released in 2006. His most recent movie, released on October 31, 2008, was entitled Possumus Woman, and is the sequel to his 1995 film, Possumus Man. All of his films have been released independently.

Films
Year	Film
1995	Possumus Man
1996	Adventure!
1999	The Adventurous
2000	The Lizard of Death
2006	Port Washington
2008	Possumus Woman

=== The Ben Heck Show ===
Ben Heck starred in a weekly online TV program called element14's The Ben Heck Show, hosted on YouTube and the element14 Community. As of June 2016, the show had recorded more than 33 million views worldwide. A typical episode has Ben creating a new product or hacking existing devices, such as an Xbox, for different uses, sometimes based on viewers' suggestions.

As the host of element14's The Ben Heck Show, Heckendorn has made celebrity appearances as an attendee or judge at numerous industry events and competitions, including Maker Faire Detroit and Engadget Expand.

It was announced during an interview with an Element14 Community member that Ben would be leaving The Ben Heck Show after June 2018. The Ben Heck Show was replaced with Element14 presents, a similar show featuring a new cast of hosts.
