= Chicago Gaming =

American pinball manufacturer

Churchill Cabinet Company
- Industry: Arcade Games; Pinball Machines
- Founded: 1904 in Chicago, Illinois, United States
- Founder: Ole Gullickson
- Headquarters: Cicero, Illinois, United States
- Key people: Doug Duba (president)
- Website: chicago-gaming.com

Churchill Cabinet Company is a gaming company that was founded by Ole Gullickson in 1904 in the Cicero suburb of Chicago where it is still based. It is notable for pinball machines produced under the Chicago Gaming brand.

== History ==
The company began as an industrial cabinet maker located on Churchill Street, from which it took its name. It started with specializing in fine wood cabinetry such as casings for organ manufacturers, and phone booths. In its earlier history prominent clients included Rock-Ola, Seeburg, and Bally. It was acquired by Roger Duba in the mid-1970s and began to focus more on making cabinets for the coin-op industry. This side of the business expanded over the following three decades until contract manufacturing consisting of cabinet assembly and game assembly accounted for 50% of the business, with the other half consumer products such as foosball, air hockey, and bumper pool. In this period the company produced cabinets for Namco, Midway, Williams, Stern, and others. It purchased pinball playfield maker Lenc-Smith from Williams in 1996. The former Lenc-Smith site became the main site for the company in 1999 and is its current manufacturing site and headquarters.

Pinball cabinets manufactured by Churchill cabinet company were usually marked "CCC".

The foosball tables began to be produced by Roger Duba in the early 1990s under the name Good Time Novelty, targeting the home market. This part of the company was established as Chicago Gaming Company as a division of Churchill cabinet company in 2001 by Doug Duba, the son of Roger Duba. In its early years it manufactured a series of MAME Arcade Legends. This part of the company includes manufacturing complete pinball machines.

== Pinball manufacturing ==
Chicago Gaming Company's first original design was Vacation America, released in November 2003. The game was revealed in September 2002 with the name "Vacation". It was designed by John Trudeau and Steve Kordek using a single-level playfield with no ramps. Unlike most games of the time the display was a simple 2 row display of 10-digits with 7-segments rather than a DMD with animations; substantial production cost savings were made over a typical pinball machine by using printed circuit boards in place of a large part of the wire harness. Unlike other tables it was aimed as a lower cost option for home users selling for $2,995, not for arcade operators, the first to be marketed as such, and omitted the coin mechanism entirely. John Trudeau left the company while the machine was still in its whitewood stage of design, with Steve Kordek completing it. 530 machines were produced.

The larger part of the business continued to be making cabinets, back-boxes, and playfields for Stern Pinball, Jersey Jack Pinball, and others.

It was inaugurated into Pinball Expo's service & support Hall of Fame in 2014.

=== Williams/Bally remakes ===
In 2015, the first in a series of Williams remakes was released under license from Planetary Pinball. This was the highly regarded Medieval Madness and came in a standard edition, and limited edition. The 1,000 machines of the limited edition included all the features of the standard edition, and a shaker motor. The game was announced in October 2013, with preorders for an anticipated 2014 release, the limited edition sold out within four hours. LED's were used in place of the originals incandescent bulbs; it also has stereo instead of mono speakers and an LCD screen instead of a DMD. For this release, the games were assembled at the nearby Stern factory.

Medieval Madness was re-released again in 2019, this time with 3 variants. Classic edition was similar to the original. Special edition included an upgrade display with colour animations, RGB lighting, and enhanced sound. Royal edition included all the features of the special edition and a shaker motor, side mirrors and King of Payne topper, and limited in number produced.

Attack from Mars was the second remake, released in 2017. Three variants were released, standard edition is similar to the original but with modern components. The special edition has a larger colour display, tri-colour lighting on the main saucer, upgraded sound and shaker motor. The limited edition has all the features of the special edition but with additional lighting on the mini saucers, custom topper, and additional trim options. Unlike the 2015 version of Medieval Madness, Chicago Gaming did all manufacturing at their Cicero site.

Monster Bash was the third remake, announced in 2018. Three versions were released, standard edition is similar to the original but with modern components. The special edition has a larger colour display, RGB playfield and other lighting upgrades, upgraded sound, and more detailed playfield monsters. The limited edition has all the features of the special edition but with Monsters of Rock 3D sculpted topper, shaker motor and numbered plaque; 1,250 machines of this model were released.

Cactus Canyon was the fourth remake, announced in 2021. Unlike the previous remakes this is based on a machine that was released by Williams, but without finished code. All versions of the remake include enhanced software with completed code and colour animations on a larger display than the original, full RGB lighting, and enhanced sound. The special edition was also available with a wild west shootout topper incorporating a mini-game. The limited edition also includes additional sculptures, art blades, and a shaker motor. This edition is limited to 1,250 machines.

Both versions of Cactus Canyon remake can be upgraded with the Lyman Sheats upgrade. This adds 10 new modes, many new animations, sounds, and music; also a physical saloon mechanism and a spinner. This was the last game Lyman Sheats worked on, and his code was finished by Josh Sharpe and Sam Zehr.

=== Pulp Fiction ===
Pulp Fiction
- front of Pulp Fiction pinball flyer
- Manufacturer: Chicago Gaming
- Release date: March 2023
- Players: 4
- Design: Mark Ritchie
- Programming: George Petro and Josh Sharpe
- Artwork: Scott Pikulski
- Mechanics: Eureka Design
- Music: David Thiel
- Sound: David Thiel

Chicago Gaming and Play Mechanix launched their first joint collaboration with Pulp Fiction, based on the film of the same name in 2023. The game was released in two versions – the Special edition, and the Bad Mother Flipper Limited Edition with a maximum of 1,000 units including an animated topper and other upgrades. The game uses 1980s style alpha-numeric LED displays rather than a typical dot-matrix display or an LCD panel. The game features more than 250 sound samples from 19 different characters, and five music tracks featured in the film. Consistent with its 1980s style of design, the game has no ramps.

It was developed at the request of Quentin Tarantino who wanted a 1980s style Pulp Fiction machine for his home. Whilst it has the initial appearance of a 1980s machine, modern pinball technology is used, including RGB lighting and a more complex ruleset than a 1980s machine. The rules were designed by Josh Sharpe, son of Roger Sharpe.
