= Attack from Mars =

1995 pinball machine

Attack From Mars
- Manufacturer: Midway
- Release date: December 1995
- System: Midway WPC-95
- Design: Brian Eddy
- Programming: Lyman Sheats
- Artwork: Doug Watson
- Mechanics: Robert C. Friesl
- Music: Dan Forden
- Sound: Dan Forden
- Production run: 3,450

Attack from Mars is a 1995 pinball machine designed by Brian Eddy, and released by Midway (under the Bally label). The game uses the DCS sound system. A remake was released by Chicago Gaming in 2017.

In this game, the player attempts to fend off an alien invasion from the planet Mars by defending the world's major cities, destroying the invasion fleet, and conquering Mars itself.

== Design ==
The game was conceived of by Brian Eddy celebrating classic 50s sci-fi movies like The War of the Worlds, but with a modern sense of humour. It has a fan layout, meaning all shots can be hit from the two flippers at the bottom of the playfield.

Notable features on the playfield include four mechanized Martian figures, a strobe light (for Strobe Multiball), and several flying saucers mounted above the ramps/loops. The largest of these, placed above a set of targets at the top center of the playfield, can shake and flash in time with the player's success in defeating Martian forces.

The diverters use a different method of operation than on earlier games.

During the earlier part of the design process of the machine the large flying saucer could move around the middle third of the playfield, but was removed due to cost and reliability concerns. In the production version this saucer is fixed and has a xenon flash tube underneath it.

Doug Watson conceived the design of the Martians with four arms each with three fingers. He recorded all of the Martians' spoken lines and modeled the woman on the backglass after a friend of his.

== Gameplay ==
Six objectives must be completed in order to qualify for the Rule the Universe wizard mode, as follows:

- Super Jets: Score a specified number of hits on the pop bumpers to boost their value for the remainder of the current ball.
- 5-Way Combo: Make at least five lit shots in quick succession.
- Super Jackpot: Shoot the lock repeatedly to lock three balls and begin regular multiball, with both loops, both ramps, and the lock lit to award jackpots. Collecting all five lights the Super Jackpot, which cycles among the five shots; shooting the lit one awards the points and relights all jackpots at increased value.
- Martian Multiball: Hit all seven MARTIAN targets to light Martian Attack at the "Stroke of Luck" scoop. Once the mode is started, destroy four Martians (by hitting T, I, any of M-A-R, and either of A-N) within 30 seconds to begin Martian Multiball. This is a two-ball mode in which all MARTIAN targets can be hit for extra points. "Martian Bombs" can be earned during the game and used in the 30-second countdown by pressing the ball launch button; each bomb will destroy one Martian.
- Total Annihilation: Shoot all four ramps/loops three times each. Each of the first three ramps/loops completed in this fashion will start a hurry-up countdown, collected by hitting the saucer at the top center. The fourth immediately starts Total Annihilation Multiball (four balls), with all four shots and the lock lit for jackpots. Completing a ramp/loop while a hurry-up is in progress will reset it to a higher value, or immediately award that value if the ramp/loop starts Total Annihilation.
- Conquer Mars: A bank of three stand-up targets rises to block access to the saucer. Hitting all three lowers the bank and starts an attack wave, in which the player must defend a city against the Martians by repeatedly shooting the saucer. Once five waves are completed, the player can start a sixth one in which the goal is to destroy Mars by shooting the saucer 10 more times.

Saucer with target bank raised

Once all six objectives are met, the player can shoot the "Stroke of Luck" scoop to begin Rule the Universe, a four-ball multiball in which all shots and scoring modes are active. The goal is to score 5 billion points without losing every ball; doing so awards a further 5 billion. Once Rule the Universe ends, the player can immediately begin to make progress toward enabling it again.

The game includes five multiball modes, the four described above as well as Strobe Multiball (three balls), which can only be started as a random "Stroke of Luck" award. The stand-up target bank rises to block access to the saucer; repeated hits to these targets score points and give awards.

There is a video mode which was coded by Brian Eddy, this involves shooting down flying saucers, and then the mothership.

== Reception ==
Attack from Mars is noted for its lasting cultural impact and its ability to appeal to both newer and experienced players, and received attention for its unusually high scoring.

In a 2023 retro review Pinball Mag called it "a success of esteem rather than sales", noting it sold about 1/6th the number of machines as the best-selling The Addams Family, which released in 1992. They praised the fan layout, which is accessible for new players while leaving reaching the wizard mode a challenge for more experienced players giving an overall rating of 7.4/10. In a 1996 review of the year, this reduction in sales of pinball machines was noted by Williams themselves.

== Sequels and later machines ==
A sequel called Revenge from Mars, was released in 1999. It was designed by George Gomez, and most of the original Attack from Mars design team. It was the first game to run on Williams' Pinball 2000 platform. WMS Gaming introduced slot machines in 2011 called Attack from Mars and Revenge from Mars.

=== Digital versions ===
The table was included in the arcade game cabinet UltraPin in 2006.

Attack from Mars was released for The Pinball Arcade in March 2013, until its delisting on June 30, 2018.

It released for Pinball FX3 for several platforms on December 4, 2018, and included additional animations; a remastered version was released for Pinball FX on March 31, 2022. In 2019 Zen Studios released Williams Pinball on IOS and Android and included Attack from Mars; a follow-up mobile game, Zen Pinball World, was released in December 2024, and this table added on February 28, 2025. A VR version released for Pinball FX VR on May 15, 2025.

=== Remake ===
In 2017, the Chicago Gaming Company released three new versions: Attack From Mars Classic, Attack From Mars Special Edition, and Attack From Mars Limited Edition. The company acquired the license to re-make the game in 2010, along with the rights to recreate other Williams machines and parts. Each version has some cosmetic differences, including different options for cabinet trim, a large color display with HD graphics, lighting effects on the speakers, and an animated topper.
