= Time Warp (pinball) =

1979 pinball machine

- Manufacturer: Williams
- Release date: September 1979
- System: Williams System 6
- Design: Barry Oursler
- Programming: Paul Dussault
- Artwork: Constantino Michell
- Sound: Paul Dussault
- Production run: 8,875

Time Warp is a 4-player Solid State Electronic pinball machine from September 1979 produced by Williams. A total of 8,875 units were produced.

== Description ==
The table features a variety of mythological and historical themes. The inclusion of Da Vinci's Vitruvian Man on the backglass may be the only depiction of male nudity from a pinball machine manufacturer. The artwork is by Constantino Michell, whose hidden signature can be found on the back of the glass, behind the glove of the time wizard. An image of the Mona Lisa is shown. The central image appears to be based on an unauthorized likeness of fantasy artist Michael Whelan, possibly taken from a picture in a 1978 art book featuring his photograph.

It features electronic sound, with the background sound increasing in pitch and intensity as more points are accumulated, making it seem as though the machine is about to explode if the ball stays in play long enough. The pitch and intensity of sound return to normal at the commencement of a new ball.

== Banana Flippers ==
It is notable for being only one of two pinball machines (Williams' 1978 Disco Fever being the other) to ever use curved "banana flipper bats, which made the ball easier to trap. According to Barry Oursler, the game's designer, the management of Williams chose to incorporate these flippers, rather than himself. The 'Banana' (or curved) Flippers were standard on many but not all Time Warp units. Approximately the last 2000 of Time Warp's production came with normal flipper bats.

Other notable features are the five pop bumpers.

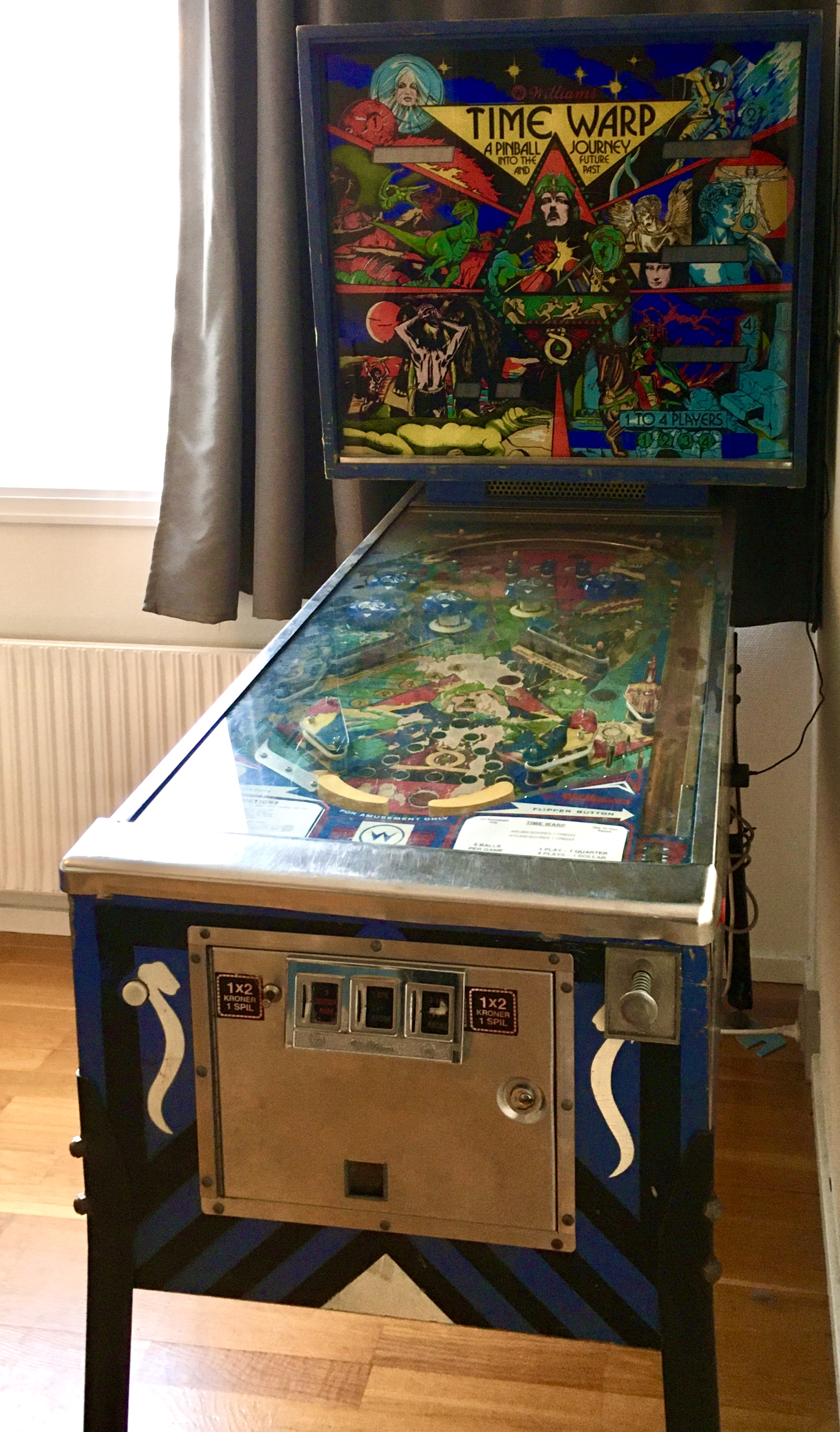
A photo of a Time Warp machine

== Marketing ==
According to TNT Amusements INC, this was the first time Williams Electronics, Inc. used color coordinated advertising.

The machine's marketing slogan was "Where future and past collide, the action is unreal!" ...the profit time bomb.

== In pop culture ==
Time Warp is featured in the Carlo Verdone film Troppo forte. The Time Warp pinball machine is also seen in the 2000 American metafiction horror film Book of Shadows: Blair Witch 2. Time Warp is also addressed in the comic book "Death Save" by Rune Ryberg.
