= Hardbody =

1987 pinball machine

- Manufacturer: Bally
- Release date: April 1987
- System: Bally MPU A084-91786-AH06 (6803)
- Design: Ward Pemberton
- Programming: Rehman Merchant
- Artwork: Greg Freres
- Sound: Bob Libbe
- Production run: 2,000

Hardbody is a pinball machine designed by Ward Pemberton and released by Bally in 1987.

== Design ==
Hardbody is named after bodybuilding, featuring a two time winner of Ms. Olympia Rachel McLish in four poses on the backglass showing her physique. It is the first pinball machine to use bodybuilding as a theme. Head of pinball design at Bally, Jim Patla, re-hired Ward Pemberton to design the game; the theme was chosen because the parent company owned Bally Total Fitness.

Using photos on the backglass followed Gottlieb's use of them beginning with Raven in 1985; this is the only Bally machine to use photo art and drawn art. The artist disagreed with using this approach for the backglass, but others at Bally thought it was required to remain competitive.

Four alphanumeric displays are at the bottom of the backbox.

The game uses a "flex save" to allow the ball to use the return lanes to reach the lower flippers.

== Layout ==
The layout is almost identical to that of a 1983 Ward Pemberton designed Bally pinball machine called BMX, using a split-level playfield, with each level having two flippers.

=== Upper level ===
The upper level includes groups of three targets labelled stations 1 and 2, with three in-line drop-targets located above station 2. There is also a loop around station 1. The gap between the upper flippers leads to the lower level.

=== Lower level ===
The lower level includes banks of targets labelled stations 3 and 4. On either side of the machine is a ramp leading to the upper level. The game does not have traditional in- and out-lanes, but has a single lane on each side with a gap in each.

== Gameplay ==
The game can be set for 3 or 5 ball play. The game is controlled by a flipper button on either side of the machine, with a flex save button located just below each of these.

The main objective is to complete the four work-out stations by hitting all the targets at each station. Lights are shown just above the lower flippers for completing sets of stations three times. The four stations are arms & shoulders, chest & back, legs, and abdomen.

At the start of a game the flex save feature is triggered automatically with an auto saver, but after that is triggered manually by the player. When triggered a block (also known as a control gate) is raised to prevent the ball from draining out of the return lane. The amount of time a control gate remains raised is dependent on the number of times they are used.

== Reception ==
In a review for Play Meter, Roger Sharpe awarded the game 2.25/4. The artwork on the playfield was praised, but the flex save feature was criticized, and the machine was called a "filler".

A reviewer for The Pinball Trader enjoyed the lighting and sound effects, but found the music to be "simple and monotonous". Overall it was found to be a very enjoyable and fast machine.

Greg Freres declared it to be his "unfavourite game".
