= Future Spa =

1979 pinball machine

- Manufacturer: Bally Manufacturing
- Release date: March 20, 1979
- System: Bally MPU AS-2518-35
- Design: George Christian
- Artwork: Back Glass-Paul Faris Playfield-Dave Christensen
- Production run: 6,400 units

Future Spa is a solid state, wide body, pinball machine produced in 1979 by Bally Manufacturing. It was Bally's first machine with continuous background sound and in-line drop targets. Notable game features include: Flippers (2), Pop bumpers (5), Slingshot (1), Spinning targets (2), Kick-out hole (1), Star rollover (1), 4-in-line drop targets, Left kicker lane, Left out-lane detour gate.

It was unique in the fact that it had recessed back-box lighting and prismatic diffuser behind the "Future Spa" logo for a holographic effect. The holographic effect was an idea of Norm Clark. He wanted to do this already on Magic Town / Magic City while working at Williams but it was regarded to be too expensive. The marketing slogan from the Bally flyer read: "Future Spa will awaken your pinball senses"
