= Monster Bash (pinball) =

1998 pinball machine

- Manufacturer: Williams
- Release date: July 1998
- System: Williams WPC-95
- Design: George Gomez
- Programming: Lyman Sheats
- Artwork: Kevin O'Connor
- Mechanics: Chris Shipman, Robert C. Friesl
- Music: Vince Pontarelli
- Sound: Vince Pontarelli
- Production run: 3,361

Monster Bash is a pinball machine produced by Williams. The game features six Universal Monsters, namely The Creature from the Black Lagoon, The Wolf Man, Frankenstein's monster, the Bride of Frankenstein, Dracula and The Mummy.

== Description ==
The main goal of the game is to collect the instruments of the iconic horror characters and form the Monsters of Rock band. The table includes a Phantom Flip; when this feature is enabled, the player can let go of the flipper buttons and allow the game to attempt a shot.

The machine has an easter egg mode called “Lyman’s Lament”. It features different music and comments of programmer Lyman Sheats while the ball is played. The game uses the DCS Sound System.

Very few changes were made from the CAD drawings through the whitewood to the final layout.

A version of the backglass including dancing girls in cages was vetoed by Universal. The final version of the artwork on the backglass includes the Creature from the Black Lagoon holding the damsel, with his saxophone suspended in midair despite him supposedly playing it. On the backglass of the 1992 pinball machine Creature from the Black Lagoon, Creature and the damsel are shown in a similar pose. This final version was described as having a "more focused theme and composition".

playfield

== Modes ==
Each of the six monsters has an associated mode that must be played in order to earn their instrument.

- Full Moon Fever: Shoot the left/right orbits a total of four times to start a hurry-up countdown. Each additional shot to an orbit collects the points and resets the countdown to a higher value. Four hurry-up shots are needed to collect the Wolf Man's drum kit.
- Creature Feature: Shoot the Creature's lagoon four times to start a hurry-up, then hit any lit shot (left/right ramps, left/right orbits, center lane) to collect it and start a 20-second timer. The remaining four shots each award increasing multiples of the hurry-up score and reset the timer, and all of them must be made to earn the Creature's saxophone. Shooting the lagoon credits the player with one shot, awards the relevant points, and resets the timer.
- Ball and Chain: Shoot the left and right ramps three times each, then hit them three more times each within 30 seconds to receive the Bride of Frankenstein's microphone. The timer can be reset up to three times during this mode by shooting the center lane. If the player completes the mode, the ramps award increased values until the timer runs out and any remaining resets can still be used.
- Frankenstein Multiball: Two standup targets block the center ramp. Repeated hits light the body parts of Frankenstein's monster; once all six are lit, the standups sink below the field and the player can shoot the ramp to start a three-ball multiball. In order to collect the monster's keyboard, the player must score six super jackpots by hitting a figurine of the monster, which swings down to block the ramp. Regular jackpots can be collected by making any other lit shot.
- Mummy Mayhem: Hit the jet bumpers a set number of times, then shoot the center scoop. In order to light the Mummy's bass guitar, the player must score a set number of points within 45 seconds; all major shots are lit for jackpots, the bumper value is tripled, and all other targets/switches award a set value. Completing the mode early awards bonus points for every second left on the timer.
- Drac Attack: Hit the "Drac Attack" standup targets a total of seven times, then shoot the center scoop to start a 30-second timer. The player must then hit a figurine of Dracula as it moves on a curved track, with the timer resetting after each hit. His guitar is awarded after five hits. Under normal difficulty settings, the player is spotted three "Drac Attack" target hits at the start of the game, requiring four more to enable the mode.

The player can earn "monster bomb" items, which can be used to make progress during the associated modes by pressing the ball launch button. Each item is specific to one monster: a garlic clove for Dracula, a silver bullet for the Wolf Man, a spear gun for the Creature, a hair dryer for the Bride, a flaming torch for Frankenstein's monster, and an ancient scroll for the Mummy.

== Multiballs ==
In addition to Frankenstein Multiball (see "Modes" above), the game includes three other multiballs, all of which are started by shooting the center scoop once they are enabled.

- Mosh Pit Multiball: Enabled by shooting the center lane a set number of times. This mode starts with two balls; up to two more may be added, one at a time, by shooting the center lane. All shots are lit for jackpots, with a super jackpot awarded for a set number of center ramp shots or standup target hits.
- Monster Bash: This is a wizard mode that is enabled as soon as the player has started all six modes. A four-ball multiball in which all shots are lit for jackpots.
- Monsters of Rock: This is a different wizard mode that is enabled only by lighting all six instruments. The player receives a bonus for all instruments collected, plus an additional bonus for every complete set. A four-ball multiball in which all shots are lit for double the Monster Bash value. If the player starts Monster Bash and collects all remaining instruments while it is in progress, it is immediately replaced by Monsters of Rock and any previously drained balls are re-launched.

If the player qualifies for Monster Bash or Monsters of Rock by playing Frankenstein Multiball, the wizard mode will be enabled once single-ball play resumes.

The monsters become unlit after playing Monster Bash, while both the monsters and instruments become unlit after playing Monsters of Rock. In both cases, the player can immediately begin making progress toward relighting them.

Whenever the player starts any multiball other than Monsters of Rock, any modes in progress continue with their timers frozen as long as two or more balls are on the field. Once all balls have drained except one, the timers begin to run again. Monsters of Rock terminates any active modes without completing them.

== Digital versions ==
Monster Bash was formerly available as a digital table in The Pinball Arcade until June 30, 2018 when it was taken down from digital stores after the license expired. Zen Studios then acquired the digital rights license for the Bally and Williams tables in September of 2018.

On October 29, 2019, a digital table was made available again as part of an add-on pack for Pinball FX 3, which also included the Creature from the Black Lagoon table.; with a remastered version released for Pinball FX on March 31, 2022

The table is also available in Williams Pinball for iOS and Android.

== Remake ==
In October 2018, the Chicago Gaming Company released three new editions of Monster Bash: Monster Bash Classic, Monster Bash Special Edition, and Monster Bash Limited Edition.

A review of this version by Nudge Pinball found it to be an enhanced version of the original, and manufactured to be more reliable with modern technology.
