= Fireball (pinball) =

1972 pinball machine

- Manufacturer: Bally
- Release date: February 1972
- System: Electro-mechanical
- Design: Ted Zale
- Artwork: Dave Christensen
- Production run: 3,815

Fireball is a pinball machine designed by Ted Zale and released by Bally in 1972. The table featured elaborate artwork by Dave Christensen a spinning disc and moveable flippers. Three further models were produced using various layouts, including Fireball II in 1981.

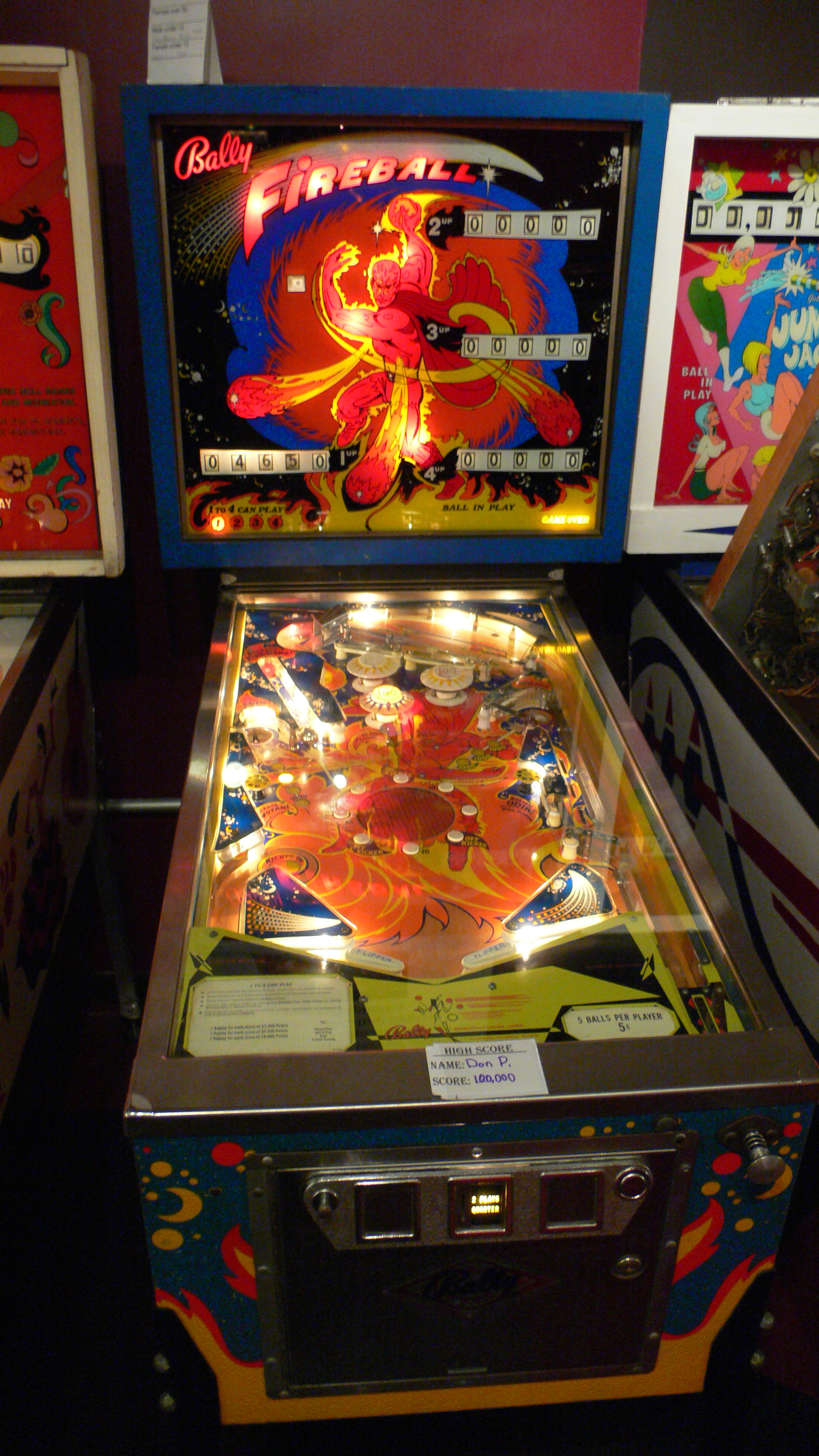
Fireball on display at the Silverball Museum in Asbury Park, NJ

== Description ==
The game itself is notable as it featured several pinball innovations, including a spinning disc (called "whirlwind spinner" on the flyer) in the center of the playfield which spins continuously throughout a game, moveable "zipper" flippers, and trapped ball bonuses. The zipper flippers move to their inner position if the blue mushroom bumper is hit, or to the outer position if a yellow mushroom bumper is hit; when in the inner position the gap between the flippers is smaller than the ball. It also includes the "messenger ball", this is a ball trapped in a channel that can be hit with the ball in play to try and get it to hit the target behind it.

Fireball was an early table to feature multi-ball. This is started by locking a ball in each of the games saucers, Odin and Wotan (the fire gods), and then hitting a target with the messenger ball.

Fireball's playfield and backglass featured elaborate artwork of a flaming "fire man", flames, and stars in space. The concept of this fire god came from a comic book.

== Reception ==
The game was described by some as "possibly the finest EM flipper game ever produced", with Playboy describing it as "perfect pinball.

== Cultural references ==
Chip Carter bought one of these machines in 1977 while his father, Jimmy Carter, was president; it was inspected by the secret service on delivery.

Richard Linklater owned a Fireball, and it appears in two of his films. In the 2001 film Waking Life he plays a rotoscoped Fireball in the penultimate scene where he expounds Dickian gnosticism to the protagonist. Also, Linkater's 1993 film Dazed and Confused features a scene that shows extreme close-ups of a game being played on a Fireball.

During the episode "Pinball" (Original air date: November 29, 1985) of the television series Mr. Belvedere, the title character becomes obsessed with a "Firebomb" pinball machine, a slightly altered Fireball.

== Digital versions ==
The table was included in the arcade game cabinet UltraPin in 2006.

Fireball was released for The Pinball Arcade in 2016, but removed from sale on June 30, 2018 due to the loss of the Williams license.

== Sequels ==
=== Fireball Professional Home model ===
Partly due to the success of the original Fireball pinball machine, Bally released a "Professional Home Model" available to the regular consumer beginning in 1976. The layout was different from the arcade Fireball; it was a slight modification of the Bally's Hocus Pocus playfield with the subtraction of a ball diverter gate. Sears sold it for $645.

=== Fireball II ===
Fireball II
- Manufacturer: Bally
- Release date: June 1981
- Design: Gary Gayton
- Programming: Rehman Merchant
- Artwork: Dave Christensen
- Production run: 2,300

In June 1981, Bally released Fireball II which used similar style of artwork, also by Dave Christensen; the artist described this as "more sinister" than the first version. Another backglass for "Son of Fireball" was created, but no machine with this title was produced.

The playfield layout unrelated to the original. It included the "little demon post", a post between the flippers that could be raised a limited number of times by the player using an additional button next to the right flipper button. In the centre of the playfield is a captive ball similar to that used on an earlier Williams game, Doodle Bug, which was incorporated at the insistence of the designer of that machine, Norm Clark, who was now head of design at Bally.

In a review for Play Meter, Roger Sharpe found it to be an average game, rating it at 2/4. Marco Rossignoli described it as not a bad playing game, but one which lacks flow and could be more enjoyable to look at than play.

=== Fireball Classic ===
Fireball Classic
- Manufacturer: Bally
- Release date: February 1985
- Design: George Christian and Ted Zale
- Programming: Rehman Merchant
- Artwork: Doug Watson
- Sound: Bob Libbe
- Production run: 2,000

In February 1985, Bally released Fireball Classic. While the playfield closely resembled the original this version was electronic and used standard size flippers instead of zipper-flippers. The bumpers in this version activated more slowly than normal for a solid state machine, to simulate an older game. In a review for Play Meter, Roger Sharpe rated this machine at a generous 2/4 due to nostalgia for the original version. He noted that the 1972 version had helped propel Bally to be a leading pinball manufacturer.
