= Flash (pinball) =

1979 pinball machine

- Flash flyer, page 3
- Manufacturer: Williams
- Release date: January 1979
- System: Williams System 4 & 6
- Model #: 486
- Design: Steve Ritchie
- Programming: Randy Pfeiffer
- Artwork: Constantino Mitchell
- Mechanics: John Jung
- Sound: Randy Pfeiffer
- Production run: 19,505

Flash is a 1979 pinball game designed by Steve Ritchie and released by Williams. The game is named after flashes of lightning, with the sound of thunder increasing in volume as the game is played. It was the highest earning pinball machine for operators in 1979.

== Design ==
This was Steve Ritchie's first game for Williams, designed after developing Superman for Atari. This game was known for having the first continuous background sound for a pinball game, as well as the first pinball game to use Flash lamps.

The game takes its name from the flash of lightning simulated by flashing lights behind the backglass, and the sound of thunder. The longer a ball stays in play, the louder the thunder gets.

The backglass shows "a storm in the making", with a lady by the side of a male figure.

Steve Ritchie designed about 90% the game on a cocktail napkin during a flight, while flying from Atari to Williams. The game also broke the factory production record at Williams and is still Ritchie's biggest seller.

The game used a 1 Mhz Motorola 6800 microprocessor tied to a 8-bit DAC. For storage it only had 2Kb of ROM, and 128 bytes of RAM so all the sounds in the game had to be expressed in compact algorithms. In that space using a sound recording only a mere 50ms would have been able to be stored.

== Gameplay ==
The game is controlled with three flippers. When the player launches the ball, it travels across the centre of the playfield and loops back to the top rollovers. By completing the first 3 of these the player doubles their bonus, and by hitting all 1-2-3-4 rollovers triples the bonus. Completing the left bank of five drop-targets advances various scoring features on the game, and completing the central bank of three drop targets activates the Flash lamps.

== Reception ==
Roger Sharpe reviewed the game for Play Meter and awarded it 4/4. Highly praising the game and saying it "opens a new era in the emphasis of sound in pinball". Overall finding it to be a remarkable game made for fast 3-ball play.

The game was the top earning pinball machine for operators in 1979, with Space Invaders the top video game for that year.

== Legacy ==
Once popularity in the United States began to dwindle, the game was licensed to Segasa and produced with different cabinet and playfield art, and renamed Storm.

This machine is the first to have all game adjustments made from the coindoor at the front of the machine instead of the backbox. There were also enhanced audit settings for operators. All future machines from Williams were designed to be controlled this way, and all other pinball manufacturers started using similar systems.
