= Maresa (company) =

Spanish pinball machine manufacturer

Maresa was a Spanish manufacturer of pinball machines which was in business between 1960 and 1976. The name stands for MAquinas REcreativas Sociedad Anonima, which can be translated as Anonymous Society of Amusement Machines.

The first two games were the electromechanical pinball machines King Ball and Boxing, and their last was the western-themed Laramie in 1976. Many of the pinball machines of the company from Madrid were copies of Gottlieb games, such as Big Brave, and Crescendo.

== List of Maresa Pinball Machines ==
- 2002
- 300
- 4x4
- Beisbol
- Big Brave
- Big Horse
- Bongor
- Boxing
- Bus Stop
- Can Can
- Carrusel
- Centigrade
- Chamonix
- Crescendo
- Dakota
- Dakota II
- Dardos
- Domino
- El Dorado
- Fans
- Far Out
- Flush
- Jacks Open
- Jumping Jack
- Kansas
- King Ball
- King Pin
- Kuwait
- Laramie
- Metropolis
- Music-Hall
- Nairobi
- Oxford
- Picnic
- Pim Pam Pum
- Pin
- Pro-Football
- Reggio
- Road Race
- Roller Coaster
- Rompeolas
- Royal Flush
- Skating
- Spin Out
- Sprint
- Surf Champ
- Surfer
- Tahiti
- Target Pool
- Texas
- Tiro's
- Top Card
- Top-Secret
- Wheel
- Ye-Ye Club

== See also ==
- Zaccaria (company), a former Italian company of pinball and arcade machines
- Taito of Brazil, a former Brazilian company of pinball and arcade machines
- Inder (company), a former Spanish company of pinball machines
- Sega, S.A. SONIC, a former Spanish company of pinball and arcade machines
