= Rally (pinball company) =

French pinball company

- Industry: Pinball
- Founded: 1961; 65 years ago in Nice, France
- Defunct: 1969
- Headquarters: Nice
- Products: Pinball machines

Rally, sometimes known as Rally Play, was a French pinball manufacturing company founded in 1961. It introduced a series of fliptronic pinball machines from 1966 incorporating innovations such as display and sound technology not used by competing manufacturers. Production ceased by 1969.

== History ==
The company was founded in 1961 as Rally Play. Alben, a company which had been manufacturing pinball machine using Gottlieb parts and designs, and Victor Salmon who had sold Alben games in the 1950s agreed to found a new company. They partnered with an existing company in Nice, Radio Laboratoie Jaubert, who produced communication equipment for the French military and NATO and could manufacture components for pinball machines; with a pinball production line created in their factory.

The first game called Bowling Flipper was produced in 1961 using parts "borrowing heavily" from Gottlieb parts. The first 15 models produced all had low production numbers.

== Fliptronic ==
Starting in 1966 a series of "fliptronic" games was produced, with the first called Rally Girl; revealed to the trade on a river cruise in Paris.

The cabinets are designed with the backglass and playfield glass able to be lifted on hinges to aid servicing. The top of the sides of the cabinet remain horizontal, with the playfield at a downward angle. Unlike most manufacturers the legs are permanently attached, but can be folded for transportation. The 2.65" flippers are shorter than on typical pinball machines.

This series of games are the first to use star rollovers which were later used by other manufacturers, including Bally and Gottlieb in the 1970s. Some components, such as relays in the backbox continued to be copies of Gottlieb parts. Playfield lights are housed in color Lucite posts.

The display uses Nixie tubes, each of which shows a single digit, with a group of four used for each player. The sound board used a simple oscillator making sounds to signal one, ten, or hundred points. Until solid state pinball machines were produced, American manufacturers continued to use score reels to display the score, and chimes for sounds.

Rally was the first manufacturer to use DC current to control the bumpers; this made them both more responsive, and had more energy to propel the ball. These bumpers use a different design to conventional bumpers.

The impact of Rally Girl was to increase orders from tens to hundreds a month. By June 1967 Rally was using a new factory at Embrun entirely for production of Fliptronic machines, while also retaining production in Nice.

Distribution of Fliptronic games reached England, Germany, Italy, and Denmark. Play boy was one of the more successful Rally games in the United Kingdom.

Most of the Fliptronic games have a simple gameplay using a single ball, advancing bumper values and gathering bonus score, with no specific goals on each game. Some models included roll down lanes at the top of the playfield, jet bumpers, or a spinning disc.

== Games ==
Year	Title	Comments	Citation
1961	Bowling Flipper	First production game	
1961	Sunday on Ice		
1962	Beach Games		
1962	Karting		
1962	Twist		
1963	Happy Papeete		
1963	Toro		
1964	Hockey Girl		
1964	The Three Musketeers		
1965	Landing on Venus		
1965	Curling		
1965	Joly Captain		
1965	Saloon		
1966	Messalina		
1966	Hairy Singers		
1966 (October 20)	Rally Girl	First Fliptronic game	
1967	West Club		
1967	Play boy	Second generation of Fliptronics	
1968	Comics		
1968	Schuss	add-a-ball version also produced for the Italian market	
1968	Flower's Child	Prototype only	

== Closure and legacy ==
Pinball Collectors Quarterly stated that Rally closed due to "the wariness of buyers to invest in machines labelled solid-state". Competition from larger American manufacturers, an inability to withstand heavy commercial use, and lack of standardization of some game parts were given as contributing factors.

After Rally ceased production, no French pinball machines were manufactured until Ben-Hur in 1977.
