= Capcom Coin-Op =

Subsidiary of Capcom USA

- Company type: Subsidiary
- Industry: Manufacturing
- Founded: June 1995; 30 years ago
- Defunct: March 2004
- Headquarters: Sunnyvale, California, U.S.
- Parent: Capcom USA
- Website: capcom.com/coinop

Capcom Coin-Op, Inc. was a wholly owned subsidiary of Capcom USA that manufactured arcade and pinball machines. It was founded in June 1995 and closed in March 2004. It developed and sold pinball and arcade game machines and converted games for the US market. Based in Sunnyvale, California, and Arlington Heights, Illinois, the company developed eight pinball machines over the course of its short existence, though only four ever made it to release.

== Formation ==
The beginnings of Capcom Coin-Op start in 1993. Capcom of Japan and Capcom USA joined with Romstar to form Game Star (a.k.a. GameStar Inc.). Capcom of Japan and Capcom USA staked the company at 60% and 10%, respectively, with Romstar providing the remaining 30%. A factory was set up in Arlington Heights, Illinois. Capcom wanted to recruit top talent for their new subsidiary so they went about headhunting experienced personnel. Mark Ritchie and Python Anghelo were two notable acquisitions, both poached from competitor Williams Electronics. This resulted in a lawsuit by Williams to keep Ritchie from designing games in line with the non-compete clause of his original Williams contract. By April 1994 the first product would be released; Goofy Hoops. A basketball themed ticket redemption game, it was released under the Romstar name but used Gamestar/Capcom hardware, with art by Python Anghelo.

== Pinball production ==
Their first pinball machine; Pinball Magic, was released in 1995 and sold 1,200 units. While there was a reference to the original Gamestar company name in the playfield the title was released under the Capcom Coin-Op name. 1996 would see the release of three further titles: Airborne, Breakshot, and Flipper Football. While Big Bang Bar was ready first, Flipper Football was considered more marketable, especially in Europe, and was moved ahead in the production queue. None of Capcom's machines sold in large quantities and the company was losing money. Faced with mounting losses, the low sales of Flipper Football, and the pinball market as a whole cooling from its peak a few years before the decision was made to cease making pinball machines in December of 1996. This cut off Flipper Football production after less than a thousand machines. While Big Bang Bar and Kingpin were finished and ready neither would enter full production by the time the company would shut down. Two further titles, motor-racing themed Red Line Fever and erotic Zingy Bingy, had reached the whitewood (prototype) stage but were not ready for production.

=== Big Bang Bar ===
Of the company's machines, Big Bang Bar acquired a legendary reputation because of its quality and the fact that its design was completed but the company folded before it was mass-produced. In 2006, Illinois Pinball Company manufactured 187 Big Bang Bar pinball machines using parts purchased from Capcom Pinball when they ceased operating. Illinois Pinball Company did not purchase any rights from Capcom Pinball and manufactured the games assuming the rights for the game were abandoned. No objections were ever filed in response to the Illinois Pinball production of the Big Bang Bar games. In 2009, Gene Cunningham sold his remaining Capcom parts to a company located in Georgia, Pinball Inc. In 2011, Gene Cunningham declared personal bankruptcy, and all his shares of Illinois Pinball were purchased by Planetary Pinball of California.

== After pinball ==
Capcom continued to operate the Coin-Op facility in Arlington Heights and use it for their other arcade products. Incredible Technologies, a company with connections to Capcom going back to at least 1988, would move into the facility in 2002 and use it as their corporate headquarters for over ten years. Capcom Coin-Op gradually left the arcade business starting in 2003, and closed in March 2004.
