= Game Plan (company) =

Defunct American pinball machine manufacturer

Game Plan was an amusement game manufacturer that produced pinball machines, arcade video games, and slot machines from 1978 to 1985. Game Plan was a subsidiary of AES Technology Systems and was initially located in Elk Grove Village, Illinois, moving in early 1979 to Addison, Illinois. Game Plan was founded in May of 1977 by two principals of AES, Lee Goldboss and Mike Abrams, and their partner, former Chicago Coin engineer and designer Wendell McAdams.

Game Plan initially produced cocktail-style pinball tables and produced five different models in their first year of existence. Three of these are based on licensed names, Real (cigarettes), Camel Lights, and Black Velvet. The company began producing full-size models with 1979's Sharpshooter, featuring a "Wild West" theme. Sharpshooter, incidentally, was Game Plan's best-selling game, having produced 4,200 units in all. From 1980 through 1982, Game Plan also released a small number of video games, most all of them licensed from other manufacturers, beginning with Tora Tora in 1980. Other games include: Killer Comet, Intruder, Megatack, Kaos, and Pot Of Gold.

Former Game Plan designer John Trudeau went on to design many other pinball games at Gottlieb/Premier and later Williams, including titles such as The Machine: Bride of Pin*Bot (1991) and The Flintstones (1994). Ed Cebula later worked as a playfield designer and mechanical engineer at Data East Pinball.

== Pinball tables (full-sized and cocktail) ==
- Real (1978, cocktail)
- Black Velvet (1978, cocktail)
- Camel Lights (1978, cocktail)
- Foxy Lady (1978, cocktail)
- Chuck-A-Luck (1978, cocktail)
- Family Fun (1978, cocktail)
- Star Trip (1979, cocktail)
- Sharpshooter (1979, Game Plan's first full-sized pin)
- Vegas (1979, cocktail)
- Old Coney Island (1979)
- Super Nova (1980)
- Pinball Lizard (1980)
- Global Warfare (1981, widebody; only 10 units produced)
- Mike Bossy the Scoring Machine (1982, never produced)
- Sharpshooter II (1983)
- Attila the Hun (1984)
- Agents 777 (1984)
- Captain Hook (1985)
- Lady Sharpshooter (1985, cocktail)
- Andromeda (1985)
- Cyclopes (1985)
- Loch Ness Monster (1985, only one prototype produced)
