= The Wizard of Oz (pinball) =

2013 pinball machine

- Manufacturer: Jersey Jack Pinball, Inc.
- Release date: April 2013
- Design: Joe Balcer
- Programming: Keith P. Johnson, Ted Estes
- Artwork: Jerry Vanderstelt, Greg Freres, Matt Riesterer
- Music: Chris Granner, Rob Berry
- Sound: Chris Granner, Rob Berry
- Animations: Jean-Paul de Win

The Wizard of Oz is a Jersey Jack Pinball, Inc. pinball machine designed by Joe Balcer and released in April 2013. It is the first US pinball machine with an LCD in the backbox as well as the first one to have color on the monitor produced in the US since the Pinball 2000 games. The first pinball machine with a backbox LCD screen worldwide was Spanish company MarsaPlay's remake of Inder's original Canasta, titled New Canasta, in 2010.

The Wizard of Oz is the first widebody pinball machine since 1994 and the first new US pinball machine not made by Stern Pinball since 2001. The pinball machine is based on the 1939 film The Wizard of Oz, itself based on the 1900 novel The Wonderful Wizard of Oz by L. Frank Baum.

== Description ==
The backbox has a 26-inch HD display that displays film clips in full color and the playfield is illuminated by RGB LED lights that can change into any color as industry firsts. Widebody pinball machines as The Wizard of Oz offer more playfield space and more to be packed in but has been too expensive because pinball sales have been in decline since 1994. The machine also includes two completely filled out upper playfields.

Upon release, the machine MSRP was $9,000 and Jersey Jack Pinball spent $2 million into the production. Jersey Jack Pinball licenses its flippers from Planetary Pinball Supply and builds its soundboards in partnership with Massachusetts’ Pinnovators. The sound system supports stereo and has 600 watts of power. A $300,000 inkjet printer was used for printing the artwork. Jersey Jack tested more than 10 different playfield finishes, rolling and shooting hundreds of thousands of balls. The machine uses Williams parts.

Toys includes ruby slipper flippers, Munchkin huts and roofs, the disappearing witch, the witch legs in the house, the witch castle walls, the throwing apple trees, the state fair balloon, the topper, the laser-cut Oz head, a crystal ball that displays videos, a spinning house and flying monkey assemblies. The machine includes 5 flippers with a reverse flippers mode, 4 pop bumpers, 2 slingshots, 5 magnets, 2 in front of the wicked witch, 2 vertical up-kickers, 1 drop target and 1 spinning target.

Dennis Nordman was hired by Jersey Jack Pinball for a year, and designed the model of the spinning house for this game.

== Gameplay ==
The game has five hurry-ups, including the Winkie guard.

== Reception ==
One of these machines was located in the shop at the Smithsonian National Museum of American History for two years during a time when the Smithsonian's ruby slippers were on display in the "American stories" exhibition which had opened a year earlier. The machine was set so visitors could play it for free.

== See also ==
- The Wizard of Oz (arcade game)
