= Heighway Pinball =

British pinball machine manufacturer

- Industry: Interactive entertainment
- Founded: 2012
- Founder: Andrew Heighway
- Defunct: 2018
- Fate: Liquidation
- Headquarters: Ebbw Vale, UK
- Products: Pinball
- Website: heighwaypinball.com is no longer online.

Heighway Pinball was a British company, established in 2012, that manufactured pinball machines. It was founded by Andrew Heighway in Merthyr Tydfil. The first table by the company, Full Throttle, was released in 2015. The racing-themed game features, as a speciality, an LCD screen for scores, info and animations on the playfield surface at player's eye view.

The company's second machine Alien is based on the movie of the same name and its first sequel Aliens. Production shipment began on 14 February 2017.

== History ==
Andrew Heighway created Heighway Pinball in 2012 with a goal of modernizing pinball. He sought to create machines where playfields could removed and swapped to allow owners to have multiple games in one cabinet at a lower price point. Heighway set up a manufacturing facility in Merthyr Tydfil, using business development grants to acquire equipment. Heighway later brought in investors to fund production. They originally announced that their first game would be Circe's Animal House, but later chose to re-theme if from Greek mythology to a motorcycle racing game called Full Throttle. Designed by Dave Sanders, Full Throttle was noted for innovative use of an LCD screen built into the playfield. In 2013, noted pinball designer Dennis Nordman joined the company.

In October 2014, Heighway announced that their next game would be Alien, designed by Nordman with production to begin in April of 2015. Two months later Nordman would leave the company, stating that he would not be the primary designer on Alien and that the production timeline was not realistic. The company then hired designer Barry Oursler. In February, 2015 Heighway began full-scale production of Full Throttle.

In 2016, the company opened a new production line, increasing their manufacturing capacity to 250 games per month. They had 26 employees. In 2017, Alien machines began shipping to buyers, although many customers complained about delays. In June 2017, investors purchased Andrew Heighway's shares of the company and he stepped down as CEO.

By April 2018, Heighway Pinball had closed the doors on its factory, laid off its employees, and was liquidated soon afterward. The rights to the Alien machine were acquired by Pinball Brothers, a company founded in June 2017 by some of Heighway pinball's investors, who began manufacturing as second run of the game in 2021. In 2022 Pinball Brothers also announced the release of a Queen pinball machine, originally developed by Heighway Pinball and designed by Barry Oursler and Dave Sanders.
