= Sega, S.A. SONIC =

Spanish company

Sega, S.A. SONIC (also known as Segasa and Segasa d.b.a. Sonic) was a Spanish coin-operated amusement machines company established by Sega Enterprises-related shareholders incorporated by Bertram Leroy Siegel as MD in March 1968, which lasted until its dissolution in 2006 – under the management of Eduardo Morales Hermo, as Marketing Director first, Vice President and CEO, who acquired the company from original shareholders Martin Bromley, Richard Stewart & Raymond Lemaire in 1994.

== History ==
In 1972, the company was a pioneer of the import of the video arcade games to Europe, starting with Pong, followed by Space Invaders, Galaxian and Asteroids. They produced pinball machines between 1972 and 1986. First, they imported American pinball machines during the sixties and seventies and later decided to make their own. Their most successful pinball machines were produced under the brand name SONIC. In 1973, the company moved to new, larger facilities located in Parla, becoming registered as Sega.S.A Sonic, although commercially it continues to use the name Segasa.

== List of Sega, S.A. SONIC Pinball Machines ==
- Astro-Flite (1974)
- Baby Doll (1975)
- Big Ben (1975)
- Big Ben (1975)
- Cannes (1976)
- Casbah (1972)
- Casino Royale (1976)
- Darling (1973)
- Dealer's Choice (1974)
- Gulfstream (1974)
- High Ace (1974)
- Lucky Ace (1975)
- Monaco (1977)
- Spanish Eyes (1973)
- Travel Time (1973)
- Triple Action (1974)

== List of Sega, S.A. SONIC Pinball Machines under the brand name SONIC ==
- Bird Man (1978)
- Butterfly (1977)
- Cherry Bell (1978)
- Chorus Line (1978)
- Faces (1976)
- Gamatron (1986)
- Hang-On (1988)
- Jai-Alai.. (1978)
- Joker's Wild (1977)
- Mars Trek (1977)
- Night Fever (1979)
- Odin Deluxe (1985)
- Pole Position (1987)
- Prospector (1977)
- Solar Wars (1986)
- Space Queen (unknown)
- Star Wars (1987)
- Star-Flite (1975)
- Storm (1979)
- Super Straight (1977)
- Third World (1978)

== See also ==
- Sega Pinball Inc., a division of Sega which existed from 1994 until 1999
- Zaccaria (company), a former Italian company of pinball and arcade machines
- Taito of Brazil, a former Brazilian company of pinball and arcade machines
- Inder, a former Spanish company of pinball machines
