= Jersey Jack Pinball =

American pinball machine manufacturer

- Industry: Interactive entertainment
- Founded: January 2011; 15 years ago
- Founder: Jack Guarnieri
- Headquarters: Elk Grove Village, Illinois, U.S.
- Products: Pinball
- Owner: Jack Guarnieri
- Website: www.jerseyjackpinball.com

Jersey Jack Pinball, Inc. is an American pinball machine manufacturing company that was established in 2011. The first table released by the company, The Wizard of Oz, appeared in 2013.

== History ==
Jersey Jack Pinball was founded in January 2011 by industry veteran Jack Guarnieri. Starting in 1975, he serviced electromechanical pinball tables for a living, and he created the website PinballSales.com in 1999. Guarnieri hired designer Joe Balcer and programmer Keith Johnson to work on the first machines, and made an agreement with Planetary Pinball for Williams/Bally parts.

In 2013, the company released its first pinball machine, The Wizard of Oz. They spent $2 million in startup and development and sold the machines for $7,000 each. Guarnieri's goal was to produce a high-quality pinball machine regardless of cost, and attract a larger female pinball audience than other manufacturers. The Wizard of Oz's release caught the attention of Guns N' Roses guitarist Slash, who reached out to the company about collaborating on a pinball machine.

In 2014, an investment firm bought a stake in the company. In 2015 a group of three investors bought a further stake in the company.

Jersey Jack's machines have been used in donations by Project Pinball Charity in 2015, 2016, and 2019.

In 2020, Jersey Jack relocated their manufacturing operations from their original location in Lakewood, New Jersey to Elk Grove Village, Illinois where their design team was already based. The first machine produced at its new location was Guns N' Roses. In 2022, the factory tour from Pinball Expo visited Jersey Jack Pinball for the first time, following the process of manufacturing Toy Story 4. As of 2023 the company had over 100 employees.

In September, 2024, the company announced that their next machine would be adapted from the Avatar franchise and released it later that year. In 2025, Guarnieri reported that they had acquired the license to make a Harry Potter pinball machine for several million dollars and that it would be the theme of their next machine. He also said that the three subsequent machines would all be licensed themes and that they had secured the licenses.

== Game development ==
Jersey Jack games have introduced several notable features over the years, including LCD screens, LED lighting, Bluetooth and Wi-Fi connectivity, and camera integration. The Wizard of Oz featured a 26-inch LCD monitor in the backglass. Dialed In! featured a camera integrated into the game's backbox to facilitate selfie photography and Bluetooth capability.

== Games ==
Title	Designer	Year of release	Comments	Citation
The Wizard of Oz	Joe Balcer	2013		
The Hobbit	Joe Balcer	2016		
Dialed In!	Pat Lawlor	2017		
Pirates of the Caribbean	Eric Meunier	2018		
Willy Wonka & The Chocolate Factory	Pat Lawlor	2019		
Guns N' Roses	Eric Meunier; Saul Hudson	2020		
Toy Story 4	Pat Lawlor	2022	Lawlor’s last game	
The Godfather 50 years	Eric Meunier	2023		
Elton John	Steve Ritchie	2023		
Avatar: The Battle for Pandora	Mark Seiden	2024		
Harry Potter	Eric Meunier	2025		
Sonic the Hedgehog	Steve Ritchie	2026	Ritchie's last game	
