= Inder (company) =

Spanish pinball machine manufacturer

Inder (Industria Electromecánica de Recreativos S.A, Madrid) was a Spanish manufacturer of pinball machines which was in business between 1970 and 1993. Francisco Maestre was the director of Inder for many years. Inder experimented with the use of CRT monitors in their pinball machine's backboxes. The result was a hybrid game called Flip VI which came out in 1990. In 2010 the Spanish company Marsaplay produced 25 prototypes of New Canasta, which is a remake of Inder's original Canasta pinball machine.

== List of Inder Pinball Machines ==
- 250 cc (1992)
- Atleta (1991)
- Black & Reed (1975)
- Brave Team (1985)
- Bushido (1993)
- Canasta 86 (1986)
- Centaur (1979)
- Clown (1988)
- Corsario (1989)
- Fifteen (1974)
- Flip-VI (1990)
- Hearts Gain (1971)
- Hot & Cold (1978)
- Keops (1976)
- Lap By Lap (1986)
- Luck Smile (1976)
- Metal Man (1992)
- Miss Universo (unknown)
- Moon Light (1987)
- Mundial 90 (1990)
- Running Horse (1976)
- Screech (1976)
- Seven Winner (1973)
- Shamrock (1977)
- Skateboard (1980)
- Stripping Funny (1974)
- Super Bowling (1974)
- Tasty Samba (1977)
- Topaz (1979)
- Touch (1973)
- Up Away (1975)
- Yale (1974)

== See also ==
- Zaccaria (company), a former Italian company of pinball and arcade machines
- Taito of Brazil, a former Brazilian company of pinball and arcade machines
- Maresa, a former Spanish company of pinball machines
- Sega, S.A. SONIC, a former Spanish company of pinball and arcade machines
