= Brian L. Schmidt =

American music composer

Brian Schmidt
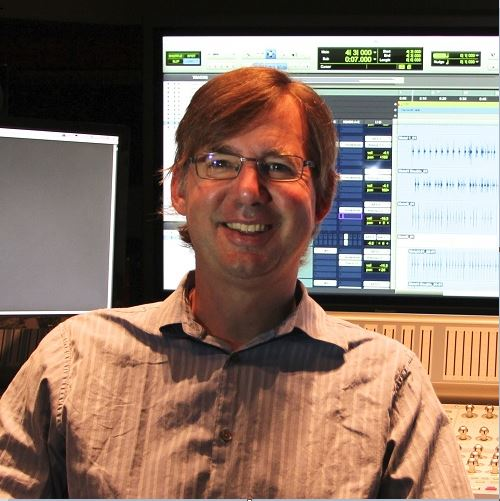
- Schmidt in Studio

Background information
- Genre: video game
- Occupations: Composer; audio director; sound designer; music technologist

Brian L. Schmidt is a music composer for various video games and pinball machines.

== Biography ==
Schmidt received dual undergraduate degrees, a B.M. in Music and a BSc in computer science from Northwestern University in 1985, where he created the first dual degree program between the School of Music and the Technological Institute there. Following that in 1987, he received his master's degree entitled "Computer Applications in Music" also from Northwestern University. Portions of his thesis were published in the Computer Music Journal in 1987. Early in his career, he worked in Chicago writing commercial jingles.

Schmidt began in the video game music and sound industry in 1987 as a composer/sound designer and programmer for Williams Electronic Games in Chicago writing music and creating sound effects for pinball machines and coin-operated video games. At Williams, he was the lead composer and sound designer for games such as Black Knight 2000, Space Station, Swords of Fury, Banzai Run as well as the video game, NARC and also contributed to Fire! and Big Guns. In 1989, his theme from the video game, NARC, was recorded and released by the Pixies.

In 1989, Schmidt left Williams to become one of the video game industry's first independent composers, sound designers and audio technologists under the company name of Schmidt Entertainment Technologies. While a consultant, he worked on over 120 console and arcade games. Schmidt is also the creator of the BSMT2000 (Brian Schmidt's Mouse Trap) audio DSP, which is used in various pinball games and video arcade machines and the QSound "Q1" 3D game sound chip used by CAPCOM.

In 1998 Schmidt was recruited by Microsoft to become Program Manager for DirectSound and DirectMusic. From 1999 to 2008, Schmidt was the program manager of the Xbox Audio and Voice Technologies division at Microsoft and was responsible for much of the audio architecture for the Xbox and Xbox 360. He created the start up sound for the original Xbox console, using 'old-school' techniques to create an 8-second sound using only 25 kilobytes of memory. Schmidt is also credited with bringing real-time Digital Surround to video gaming with the inclusion of Dolby Digital Live on Xbox. Schmidt left Microsoft in February 2008, and formed Brian Schmidt Studios, L.L.C., an independent consulting firm. He is also the creator of GameSoundCon, a conference and seminar on composing video game music and video game sound design for the professional audio community.

Schmidt was awarded the Lifetime Achievement Award from the Game Audio Network Guild (G.A.N.G.) in 2008 for his contributions to the game audio industry. He also received the 2009 G.A.N.G. recognition award at the 2010 Game Developers Conference for his work founding GameSoundCon. In 2017, he was inducted into the Pinball Expo Hall of Fame. His work has received the Sega Seal of Quality award for "Best Sound" and the Game Audio Network Guild's "Best new audio technology" awards. Game music by Schmidt is featured in the CD Box set, Legends of Game Music 2.

In 2024, Brian received the Shining Star Corporate Partner Award from Education Through Music-Los Angeles (ETM-LA), for GameSoundCon's ongoing support of the non-profit's mission.

Schmidt is the Founder and Creative Director of EarGames, an independent video game development company specializing in audio games; videogames that rely on sound for gameplay. EarGames' initial release, Ear Monsters, was released in June 2013.

Schmidt is a professor of music at DigiPen Institute of Technology in Redmond, WA.

== Schmidt's works ==
=== Pinball ===
==== Williams ====
- Fire! (with Chris Granner and Rich Karstens)
- Big Guns (with Chris Granner)
- Space Station
- Banzai Run
- Swords of Fury
- Black Knight 2000 (with Dan Forden and Steve Ritchie)

==== Data East Pinball ====
- King Kong (Pinball)
- Back to the Future: The Pinball
- The Simpsons
- Checkpoint
- Teenage Mutant Ninja Turtles
- Batman
- Star Trek: 25th Anniversary
- Hook
- Lethal Weapon 3
- Star Wars
- Rocky & Bullwinkle
- Jurassic Park
- Last Action Hero
- Tales from the Crypt
- The Who's Tommy: Pinball Wizard
- WWF Royal Rumble
- Guns N' Roses
- Maverick
- Aaron Spelling Custom Pinball (Which is actually a customized version of Lethal Weapon 3 made for Aaron Spelling)

==== Sega Pinball ====
- Mary Shelley's Frankenstein
- Baywatch
- Batman Forever
- Apollo 13
- GoldenEye
- Mini-Viper
- Independence Day
- Twister
- Space Jam
- The Lost World: Jurassic Park
- Star Wars Trilogy
- The X-Files
- Starship Troopers
- Viper Night Drivin
- Lost In Space
- Golden Cue
- Godzilla
- South Park
- Harley-Davidson

==== Stern Pinball ====
- Game of Thrones Pinball (Music)
- The Walking Dead Pinball (SFX)

=== Video games ===
- Mutant Football League
- Aaron vs. Ruth: Battle of the Bats (PC)
- Carnivores: Dinosaur Hunter HD (additional SFX, Trailer)

==== Arcade ====
- NARC (Williams; with Marc LoCascio)
- Tattoo Assassins (Data East Pinball)

==== Sega Mega Drive/Genesis ====
===== Electronic Arts =====
- Crüe Ball
- Desert Strike: Return to the Gulf (with Rob Hubbard)
- Jungle Strike
- Mutant League Football
- NBA Live 97
- Super Baseball 2020
- Toughman Contest (Genesis, 32x)
- Bill Walsh College Football (1994)
- PGA Tour 98 (PlayStation)

===== Other developers =====
- Weaponlord (Visual Concepts)
- World Heroes (Sega Midwest Studio)
- Zoop (Viacom New Media)
- Congo
- Star Trek: Starfleet Academy Starship Bridge Simulator (Interplay)
- Sega NHL All-Star Hockey '95 (Genesis)
- Blazing Dragons (video game) (PS1, Saturn Musical Arrangements & Dialogue)
- Boot Sound (Original Xbox) (Microsoft)
- Surf Ninjas (Game Gear)
- Harley's Humongous Adventure (Visual Concepts)
- GUTS (Nickelodeon, Viacom New Media)

==== Super Nintendo Entertainment System ====
- Madden NFL '94 (Electronic Arts)
- Madden NFL '95
- Madden NFL '97
- MechWarrior 3050
- NBA Live 97 (Electronic Arts)
- Weaponlord (Namco)
- NHL '96 (Electronic Arts)
