= Last Action Hero (pinball) =

1993 pinball machine

- Manufacturer: Data East
- Release date: August 1993
- System: Data East/Sega Version 3b
- Design: Tim Seckel, Joe Kaminkow, Ed Cebula, John Borg
- Programming: Lyman Sheats, Lonnie D. Ropp, John Carpenter
- Artwork: Markus Rothkranz
- Music: Brian Schmidt
- Sound: Brian Schmidt
- Production run: 5,505

Last Action Hero is a pinball machine designed by Joe Kaminkow and produced by Data East Pinball. It is based on the motion picture of the same name.

== Development and release ==
The layout of the game was initially designed for Tales from the Crypt theme; this included a coffin which was turned into a theater when the theme was changed, which was subsequently removed from the design.

Last Action Hero was one of the first games that noted pinball programmer Lyman Sheats worked on when he joined Data East. Reports at the time alleged that Schwarzenegger requested that his image be made larger than the other characters on the backbox. Production began in August 1993. The table includes part of AC/DC's "Big Gun" (main theme), Megadeth's "Angry Again" (multiball), and Queensryche's "Real World". The character played by Frank McRae is on the spinner in the middle of the game.

Four unfinished machines were taken to the June 13, 1993 premier of the film in California. Production and release of the completed game began in August.

== Design and layout ==
Instead of a typical plunger, the game features an auto plunger shaped like a Ruger Blackhawk .45 caliber pistol that launches the ball into play. The pinball machine features a shaker motor, two captive balls and a crane toy that can pick up the ball and deliver it to another part of the playfield. The game also includes three magnets under the playfield which sends the ball in different directions; similar to The Addams Family.

== Gameplay ==
Completing the three lanes above the bumpers doubles the bonus.

== Reception ==
A range of Last Action Hero games were released around the same time for different consoles as part of a heavy merchandising strategy. However, the film's poor reception may have contributed to its poor performance. One early review of the game called it, a "stinker game... that let players act out their violent fantasies."

In a review for The Flipside the geometry of the game was found to be flawed with the autoplunger often launching the ball into the drop-targets, rebounding into the right outlane. The rest of the game was found to be fun and smooth flowing, but a 10-second delay for every mode start broke up that flow.

== Digital versions ==
Last Action Hero is available as a licensed table of both The Pinball Arcade and its spin-off Stern Pinball Arcade for several platforms. Data East logos were removed because of licensing. Also, for the same reason, main play theme was edited.

== Custom version ==
Data East produced a single unit of a custom version of this machine for Arnon Milchan, called Arnon Milchan. Milchan disliked the original cabinet and also had a custom wooden cabinet made for the game. It was commissioned after Milchan's wife found out that Data East had created a custom game for Aaron Spelling. The game rules are the same as Last Action Hero, but with different sounds and animations.
