= WWF Royal Rumble (pinball) =

1994 pinball machine

- advertising flyer
- Manufacturer: Data East
- Release date: April 1994
- Design: Tim Seckel, Joe Kaminkow
- Programming: Neil Falconer, Orin Day, Lyman Sheats
- Artwork: Paul Faris, Markus Rothkranz
- Mechanics: Tim Seckel
- Music: Brian Schmidt
- Sound: Brian Schmidt
- Production run: 3,500

WWF Royal Rumble is a pinball machine designed by Tim Seckel and released by Data East in April 1994.

== Design ==
WWF Royal Rumble was first designed as a "narrow body", but redesigned as a widebody after Williams released Indiana Jones. The main additional feature was the upper playfield with mini flippers. It is the first of the two widebody pinball machines released by Data East. The machine was designed a few years prior to release. This is the first multi-level game released by Data East.

The original backglass featured more than 18 different wrestlers but by the time the game was scheduled to go into production, many of the featured wrestlers had left the WWF. The backglass was revised and the production version backglass featured only six wrestlers: Hulk Hogan, "Macho Man" Randy Savage, Yokozuna, The Undertaker, Lex Luger, and Bret Hart. The art on the backglass originally featured comically overly muscled men, but when the steroid scandal occurred in the WWF in 1993, they forced Data East to redraw the wrestlers to have more sleek frames.

RePlay announced the game with the headline A "Hulk" of a Pinball.

=== Game objectives ===
- Modes: Collect all 9 modes to begin the Rumble.
- Multi-Ball: Collect all 9 wrestlers by shooting ramps and orbits.
- Jackpots: During Multi-Ball, collect lit Royal Rumble Jackpot in front of Ramps & Orbits. Collect all 9 wrestlers during multi-ball to light the Super Jackpot at the upper playfield.
