= Space Jam (pinball) =

1996 pinball machine

- Manufacturer: Sega Pinball
- Release date: December 1996
- System: Sega WhiteStar
- Design: Joe Balcer, Joe Kaminkow
- Programming: Lonnie D. Ropp, Orin Day
- Artwork: Morgan Weistling, Jeff Busch, Marc Raneses
- Mechanics: Joe Balcer
- Music: Brian Schmidt
- Sound: Brian Schmidt

Space Jam is a 1996 pinball machine released by Sega Pinball, based on the film of the same name.

== Design ==
Joe Kaminkow previously worked on a conversion of Lethal Weapon 3 to make a Michael Jordan pinball game to raise funds for charity. Kaminkow and Lonnie Ropp wanted to create a commercial Michael Jordan pinball machine, but licensing for pinball alone was uneconomical. When the film was announced they decided to license it for use on a pinball machine, but to focus as much as possible on Michael Jordan.

This is the first game to use the "Sega Showcase backbox", which unlike most pinball machines is curved.

The game includes custom speech, with the voices of Michael Jordan (himself), Bugs Bunny (Billy West), Daffy Duck (Dee Bradley Baker), Porky Pig (Bob Bergen), Tweety (Bob Bergen) and the Chicago Bulls stadium announcer (Ray Clay). During development of the game, voice actor Fred Young recorded voices for the game. Warner Bros. did not approve his voices and they were never used.

A version of this machine with modified controls using an air pressure tube was created for Christopher Reeve.

== Layout ==
On the right of the machine where the ball plunges to is a mini-playfield with a basketball hoop. On the left of the machine is a bank of five targets spelling S-P-A-C-E. Six red insert arrows point to the main shots on the upper playfield: left and right orbits, captive ball, left ramp leading to the upper basket, right ramp, and a shot leading into the "jump ball". Above the upper basket is a 2-digit display which can show a shot countdown. Near the top of the machine are three pop bumpers, and just below these are three drop-targets. Towards the middle of the machine is a saucer called the "wabbit-hole".

== Gameplay ==
The player assumes the role of Michael Jordan. The game tracks both a pinball game score, and a score for shooting baskets.

In addition to a standard game, three other types of games can be played:

- Team play, where players 1&3 compete together against players 2&4
- League/tournament play, random and auto-percentaging awards change to fixed rewards
- Wizard play, same as league play but harder

Each ball begins with a skillshot where the player can collect an award by shooting the ball into the lower basket. The aim of the game is to light seven planets by achieving seven objectives including scoring a super jackpot during the main multiball. The player can then start "Final Jam" wizard mode by scoring a basket. This is a timed 5-ball multiball where the player attempts to collect as many jackpots as they can by scoring baskets.

The game includes a video mode where the player moves a basket to try to catch basketballs, and a trivia game with questions about Michael Jordan.

== Reception ==
Over $5M worth of Space Jam was sold "sight unseen" to distributors by the time the machine released.

== See also ==
- List of Sega Pinball machines
