= Harley-Davidson (Sega/Stern pinball) =

1999 pinball machine

Harley-Davidson (Sega/Stern Pinball)
- Manufacturer: Sega Pinball / Stern Pinball
- Release date: September 1999
- Design: Lonnie D. Ropp, John Borg
- Mechanics: John Borg
- Music: Kyle Johnson
- Sound: Kyle Johnson
- Dots/Animation: Kurt Andersen

Harley-Davidson is a Sega Pinball pinball machine released in September 1999 and was the last machine released by this company. It was designed by John Borg and Lonnie D. Ropp.

The table went through three different production runs. The first made by Sega and continued by Stern Pinball in 1999 after they bought Sega's pinball division in the same year. The second produced by Stern Pinball in 2002, and the third with an artwork change also by Stern was released in 2004.

== Description ==
The machine features a Harley-Davidson motorcycle theme including authentic engine sound. The game enables players to lock the ball in wheelies on the playfield. The game has an up post between the flippers that is controlled by the player by an extra flipper button on the right side of the cabinet.

There was a second edition of the table released in November 2002, which was a re-run of the first edition with no changes.

Due to the popularity of the first and second run, the company released 300 games as a third edition in April 2004. This version includes upgraded parts including chrome trim, different motorcycles on the playfield a 1999 and a 2000 Fat Boy as well as a 2001 Heritage Springer.

The table also features a licensed remix of the theme Born To Be Wild by Steppenwolf.

== Gameplay ==
The objective of the table is to tour 16 cities in different states of the United States, until reaching Milwaukee. The distance to travel is expressed in miles, which advances according to the progress of the city; Hitting the bumpers (Speed Pops) speeds up the process. Upon reaching the next city, the player has the chance to collect the "city patch" by reaching the stoplight, before time runs out; after that, the player moves on to the next city.

=== Initial launch ===
At the beginning of launching the ball, the player may choose between four options:

- 10 MIL: grants 10 million points.
- Speed Pops: open the path directly to the bumpers. In all other cases, the ball deflects towards the stoplight.
- Next City: allows the player to go directly to the next city by throwing the ball to the Mystery Rider hole. The sole throwing the ball to Mystery Ride hole grants a variable number of points.
- HARLEY Letter: Grants a H-A-R-L-E-Y letter for Harley multi-ball mode.

=== Multiball modes ===
The game offers the following multiball modes:

- Harley Multiball: The player gets a H-A-R-L-E-Y letter by throwing the ball under the Fat Boy doing a wheelie (or during the ball launch). When the player gets all the H-A-R-L-E-Y letter, they must throw the ball under the Fat Boy again in order to trigger the multiball.
- Speedometer Multiball: accessed by reaching the 5th gear (going through the left inner hallway) and going down the ramp.
- Red Light Multiball: accessed by completing a series of objectives and reaching the stoplight.
- Milwaukee Multiball: accessed by traveling through 16 cities, reaching Milwaukee. It is a multiball with unlimited ball saves for 80 seconds, and its objective is to go through the 48 contiguous states of the United States.

In all modes, the multiball mode ends when there is only one ball left on the playing field, or when time runs out in the corresponding modes.

=== Video Mode ===
The Video Mode is a minigame displayed on the dot matrix display at the backglass, and is accessed by completing certain objectives. The objective is to run over as many pedestrians on the road as possible, avoiding crashing with other vehicles, within a limited time. This video mode is identical to the one found in the 1994 Guns N' Roses pinball machine by Data East (Data East Pinball having been bought by Sega later that same year).

=== Extra ball ===
The game awards an extra ball for reaching 120 million points (by default), and by completing some tasks.

== Digital versions ==
Stern's 3rd edition was released by FarSight Studios for The Pinball Arcade in 2012, and Stern Pinball Arcade in 2016 for several platforms.
