= Batman Forever (disambiguation) =

Batman Forever is a 1995 film in the Batman film series.

Batman Forever may also refer to:

- Batman Forever (soundtrack)
- Batman Forever (score)
- Batman Forever (pinball)
- Batman Forever (video game)
- Batman Forever: The Arcade Game
