= Cosmic Smash =

2001 video game

- European arcade flyer
- Developer: Sega Rosso (Note: Credited under the Sega name on the original arcade release.)
- Publisher: Sega
- Platforms: Arcade, Dreamcast
- Release: Arcade: JP: January 11, 2001; EU: March 18, 2001; Dreamcast: JP: September 13, 2001
- Genre: Sports (Squash)
- Mode: Single player
- Arcade system: Sega NAOMI

Cosmic Smash (コズミックスマッシュ) is a 2001 sports video game developed and published by Sega for arcades. It was ported to the Dreamcast console. It is a futuristic combination of squash and Breakout, and is a single player game. It is one of the few Dreamcast games to be released in a DVD-style case, rather than a jewel case. A reimagining titled C-Smash VRS was released for the PlayStation 5 via PlayStation VR2 and Meta Quest on June 23, 2023, and Pico 4 on April 4, 2024.

== Gameplay ==
The information provided below is based on the Sega Dreamcast port of the game. The arcade version is visually similar with the same gameplay, but stage names and other options may vary.

The game is set in a bus or subway-style system, where each stage is a named "stop" on the line. There is an overall time limit, and each stage completion adds bonus time to that time limit. Both the starting time limit and the bonus time can be adjusted. In the Dreamcast version, the first seven stages of every playthrough are the same, starting at station 707 ("Welcome"), and advancing by 10 (717, 727, etc.) to station 777 ("Nami"). After these opening stages, the line splits into two, and the player can choose to go left or right at this and all other forks along the line. The game ends when the player runs out of time, or when they reach a special stage at the "end of the line." Depending on the route chosen at each fork, each completed playthrough of Cosmic Smash can have a different number of stages. The player can choose to go directly to the end of the line, or choose a more winding path with more difficulty with the chance for more points.

Each stage is the same every playthrough, allowing experienced players to plan a route and shot selection to either maximize their high score or clear each stage as quickly as possible in a speedrun style playthrough. The player must clear all target tiles on each stage to proceed. Target tiles may move in a specified pattern on certain stages. There are also walls and moving tiles in some stages, requiring the player to bounce shots off of the side, top, or bottom walls of the play area to navigate around.

Target tiles may deflect the ball back to the player, as in "Breakout," though some tiles will allow the ball to pass through unobstructed, as in the "Breakthru" variant of the same game. In addition to 'standard' shots, the player can charge a 'trick shot,' combining them with the joystick to set up elaborate, athletic, and powerful shots. The drawback to trick shots are not just in the charge time to swing—while charging, the game timer ticks down faster than normal. However, trick shots will "breakthru" target tiles that standard shots cannot, and the different physics of trick shots allow the player to attack the board from differing angles.

The Hi-score table stores the top 20 scores. Points are awarded after each stage based on the number of tiles cleared, the type of shot used to finish a stage, and how long the player takes to clear the stage. The Dreamcast version also produces a unique code at the end of each playthrough, directing the player to enter the code at a now defunct website at the official Cosmic Smash website to be entered into a worldwide leaderboard (though on console, the game was only released in Japan). A similar third-party leaderboard was available at the website Solvalou, but has also since become defunct. At last update, the highest score on the third-party leaderboard was a two-way tie of 590,678,903—both entries by an English player named "Alex" with a listed age of 11. The top three scores on the leaderboard are almost ten times the total of the fourth place score of 60,018,465.

=== Bonus stage ===
If the player completes the final stage of their 'route,' and finishes at least eight stages with a trick shot during their playthrough, they will be awarded with a bonus stage. The game instructs players (and onlookers) to 'silence their cell phones' before pitting the player in a one-on-one match against an AI opponent defending two target tiles. This is the only stage with an "active" opponent in the game, and the AI opponent will react according to the player's shot selection. After destroying the two target tiles, the game will end, the credits will roll, and the player (if qualified) will be asked for initials for the high score table.

== See also ==
- Robo-Squash
