= Keith Elwin =

American pinball designer

- Occupation: Pinball designer
- Employer: Stern Pinball
- Notable work: Jurassic Park; Godzilla

Keith Elwin is an American pinball player and game designer, best known for designing Jurassic Park and Godzilla for Stern Pinball.

Born in Carlsbad, California, Elwin began attending pinball tournaments in 1993. He has been ranked No. 1 in the world by the International Flipper Pinball Association, which credits him with 11 victories and 19 top-4 finishes in major pinball championships—both records.

Elwin operated and repaired pinball machines in San Diego and Los Angeles.

In 2015, Elwin designed and built a homebrew pinball machine based on Archer, with a playable whitewood shown in 2016 at the Museum of Pinball. In 2017, Stern Pinball hired him as a game designer, the first of which, Iron Maiden used a layout heavily based on that of Archer. His designs are consistently ranked among the top pinball games of all time, based on the Pinside Top 100.

Elwin was the lead designer on these Stern Pinball games:

- Iron Maiden: Legacy of the Beast (2018)
- Jurassic Park (2019)
- Avengers: Infinity Quest (2020)
- Godzilla (2021)
- James Bond 007 60th Anniversary Limited Edition (2022)
- Jaws (2024)
- King Kong: Myth of Terror Island (2025)
- Fallout (2026)

== Awards and honors ==
- 2006: Named “World’s Greatest Pinball Player” by the International Flipper Players Association.
- U.K. Pinball Hall of Fame: Inducted 2023

== See also ==
- Professional and Amateur Pinball Association
