= Engelbrektsson =

Engelbrektsson or Engelbrektson is a surname. Notable people with the surname include:

- Eivor Engelbrektsson (1914–2004), Swedish actress
- Engelbrekt Engelbrektsson (1390s–1436), Swedish nobleman
- Jorian Engelbrektsson (born 1982), Swedish pinball player
- Karl Engelbrektson (born 1962), Swedish Army officer, Chief of Army
- Olav Engelbrektsson (c. 1480–1538), Archbishop of Norway
