= Stern Pinball Arcade =

2016 video game

- Developers: FarSight Studios, Stern Pinball Inc.
- Publishers: Stern Pinball Inc. System 3 (EUR)
- Platforms: Android, iOS, macOS, Microsoft Windows, Samsung Gear VR, PlayStation 4, Xbox One, Nintendo Switch
- Release: Samsung Gear VR: WW: June 2, 2016; PlayStation 4: NA: November 15, 2016; Xbox One: NA: November 28, 2016; Android: WW: December 24, 2016; iOS: WW: December 24, 2016; Steam (Windows, macOS): WW: December 24, 2016; Nintendo Switch: WW: December 12, 2017
- Genre: Casual game; simulation
- Mode: Single-player

Stern Pinball Arcade is a pinball simulation video game developed by FarSight Studios and a spin-off of their earlier title The Pinball Arcade. This game includes recreations of pinball machines manufactured or licensed by Stern Pinball Inc., which also owns the rights to machines from Data East and Sega Pinball.

Stern Pinball Arcade is available for Android, iOS, Microsoft Windows and macOS (through Steam), PlayStation 4, Xbox One, Samsung Gear VR, Nintendo Switch.

== Development ==
The game was announced on September 20, 2015 by FarSight Studios in partnership with Stern Pinball Inc. The game was revealed on May 2, 2016 to promote the subsequently cancelled Kickstarter campaign for the AC/DC pinball machine. Due to a new partnership, the intended funding was no longer necessary.

The first four tables launched for the game on Samsung Gear VR included Ripley's Believe It or Not!, Mary Shelley's Frankenstein, Star Trek and Starship Troopers. With the exception of Star Trek, these tables were previously released for The Pinball Arcade.

Mary Shelley's Frankenstein was released as a free table for the game.

The Steam (Windows) version released on December 22, 2016 to "Very Negative" reviews, owing to widespread frustration with an apparently incomplete and buggy interface and inability to purchase DLC. Players recommending the game praised Farsight granting access to tables already purchased for The Pinball Arcade and expressed hope that issues would be resolved in the future.

== Tables ==
=== Table key ===
✓	Table has been published for this platform
✗	Table has not been published for this platform

=== Published ===
Table	Table Type	Manufacturer	Year	Season	Table Pack	iOS	AND	WIN/mOS STM	PS4	XONE	NS	Wii U	Oculus Rift	Gear VR
Ripley's Believe It or Not!	Solid State (Dot-Matrix)	Stern	2004	1	Core	✓	✓	✓	✓	✓	✓	✗	✗	✓
Mary Shelley's Frankenstein	Solid State (Dot-Matrix)	Sega	1995	1	Free	✓	✓	✓	✓	✓	✓	✗	✗	✓
Star Trek (Vengeance Premium/Enterprise Limited Edition)	Solid State (Dot-Matrix)	Stern	2013	1	Core	✓	✓	✓	✓	✓	✓	✗	✗	✓
Starship Troopers	Solid State (Dot-Matrix)	Sega	1997	1	Core	✓	✓	✓	✓	✓	✓	✗	✗	✓ ^{P}
AC/DC (Premium/Let There Be Rock and Back in Black Limited Editions) (Delisted July 1, 2019)	Solid State (Dot-Matrix)	Stern	2012	1	Core	✓	✓	✓	✓	✓	✓	✗	✗	✓
Mustang (Premium "Boss")	Solid State (Dot-Matrix)	Stern	2014	2	Core	✓	✓	✓	✓	✓	✓	✗	✗	✓
Harley-Davidson, 3rd Edition	Solid State (Dot Matrix)	Stern (Originally Sega Pinball)	2004 (1999)	2	Core	✓	✓	✓	✓	✓	✓	✗	✗	✓
Last Action Hero	Solid State (Dot-Matrix)	Data East	1993	2	Core	✓	✓	✓	✓	✓	✓	✗	✗	✓
High Roller Casino	Solid State (Dot Matrix)	Stern	2001	2	Core	✓	✓	✓	✓	✓	✓	✗	✗	✓
Phantom of the Opera	Solid State (Alphanumeric)	Data East	1990	2	Core	✓	✓	✓	✓	✓	✓	✗	✗	✓
Ghostbusters (Premium)	Solid State (Dot-Matrix)	Stern	2016	DLC	DLC	✓	✓	✓	✓	✓	✓	✗	✗	✓

== Reception ==
Lewis Ward for IDC said the static frame of reference leant itself to prolonged VR gameplay.

== See also ==
- The Pinball Arcade
