= The Lost World: Jurassic Park (pinball) =

1997 pinball machine

- Manufacturer: Sega Pinball
- Release date: June 6, 1997
- System: Sega WhiteStar
- Design: John Borg
- Programming: Orin Day, Neil Falconer
- Artwork: Morgan Weistling
- Mechanics: John Borg, Rob Hurtado
- Music: Brian Schmidt, John Williams
- Sound: Brian Schmidt

The Lost World: Jurassic Park is a 1997 pinball game designed by John Borg and released by Sega Pinball. It is based on the 1997 film of the same name.

It includes custom speech by Jeff Goldblum.

== Description ==
The playfield contains a T. rex egg as the dominant feature that breaks steadily, ultimately revealing the baby T. rex. The game has five modes, each referring to a scene from the movie, before reaching the wizard mode: where the T. rex rampages in San Diego.

The pinball machine has an optional 3D lenticular backglass.

The game includes a video mode where the player swings from vines to either swing over a dinosaur, or land in its mouth.

== See also ==
- Jurassic Park (pinball)
- The Lost World: Jurassic Park (video game)
