= GoldenEye (pinball) =

1996 pinball machine

- Manufacturer: Sega Pinball
- Release date: March 1996
- System: Sega WhiteStar
- Players: 6
- Design: Ward Pemberton
- Programming: John Carpenter, Neil Falconer, Orin Day
- Artwork: Paul Faris
- Mechanics: Rob Hurtado
- Music: Brian L. Schmidt
- Sound: Brian L. Schmidt
- Production run: 2,200 units (approximate)

GoldenEye is a pinball machine released by Sega Pinball in March 1996. It is based on the 1995 James Bond film of the same name.

It is the second pinball machine based on James Bond, following James Bond 007 released by Gottlieb in 1980.

== Design and layout ==
The game includes custom speech by Pierce Brosnan.

The major toy in the game is the rotating satellite dish with a magnet which can be reached by the pop-up ramp. In addition to this pop-up ramp, the game includes three relatively easy ramps; earlier Sega games had fewer but more difficult ramps. One of these ramps leads to a mechanism shaped like a tank which can fire the ball around the left orbit. A model of a helicopter is also located on the playfield.

The ball save consists of a magnet which throws the ball back into play, with the player required to hit a particular target within a few seconds, or the flippers become un-operable and the ball drains.

The game includes three pop bumpers which are located towards the back right of the table below the 0-0-7 upper rollovers. There are various stand-up targets around the playfield.

== Gameplay ==
Players can compete individually, or in a four-player game can play in teams of two.

The ball is launched from a button in a plunger designed to resemble a gun, ostensibly Bond’s Walther PPK. The game includes five main modes, called 007 Encounters, which are "Xenia Extra Ball Squeeze", "Satellite Hurry-up", "Nerve Gas Plant", "Train/Tank Crash", and "Send Spike". There is a Shootout video mode where the player shoots guards with the gun.

Shooting ramps collects letters of G-O-L-D-E-N-E-Y-E which then starts a hurry-up. After starting this hurry-up, the five 007 Encounters, video mode, and two more game features the wizard mode called "Goldeneye" can be started. This a multiball where jackpots can be scored, and additional balls added into play. This satellite is the GoldenEye electro-magnetic orbital weapon.

The main multiball is played with three (tank) or four (satellite) balls, where the player attempts to collect a series of jackpots to light and then collect a roving super jackpot.

== Release and reception ==
The GoldenEye pinball machine debuted at a pinball tournament in Flint, Michigan in January, 1996. Sega provided several machines to the tournament in an effort to improve sales in the region.

== See also ==
- List of Sega Pinball machines
