= Godzilla (pinball) =

2021 pinball machine

- Manufacturer: Stern Pinball
- Release date: September 2021
- System: Stern SPIKE 2 System
- Design: Keith Elwin
- Programming: Rick Naegele
- Artwork: Jeremy Packer (Zombie Yeti)
- Sound: Jerry Thompson

Godzilla is a pinball machine designed by Keith Elwin and released by Stern Pinball beginning in September 2021. It is based on the Godzilla films of the same name from the Shōwa era. It also features the song "Godzilla" by Blue Öyster Cult as its title music.

It is widely regarded as a modern classic by players of all skill levels. A previous Godzilla-themed pinball machine was produced by Sega Pinball in 1998.

== Overview ==
Upon launch, Stern released three versions; Pro, Premium, and Limited Edition. In June 2024, Stern released a 70th Anniversary version of the game which featured a black-and-white themed version of the Premium model.

The Limited Edition model is limited to 1,000 units and features a numbered plaque, custom-themed backglass, cabinet artwork and art blades as well as a shaker motor and anti-reflection glass. The artwork for the Limited Edition version is based on the film Terror of Mechagodzilla.

A series of accessories were released, including the heat ray topper which adds an extra mode to the game.

== Layout ==
The game includes two "criss-crossing" ramps.

== Gameplay ==
The premise of the game is that Xiliens have taken control of the monsters to steal earth’s resources. It is up to Godzilla to rid the earth of the Xilien invasion and destroy a few cities along the way.

The game has several skill shots.

== See also ==
- List of Stern Pinball machines

== Reception ==
Nudge Pinball found the playfield to be good, with an original flow, and that the rules are complicated.
