= Mary Shelley's Frankenstein (pinball) =

1995 pinball machine

- Manufacturer: Sega Pinball
- Release date: January 1995
- System: DataEast/Sega Version 3b
- Design: John Borg
- Programming: Neil Falconer; Orin Day; John Carpenter
- Artwork: Paul Faris
- Music: Brian L. Schmidt
- Sound: Brian L. Schmidt
- Animation: Jack Liddon; Kurt Andersen; Scott Melchionda
- Production run: 3,000 (confirmed)

Mary Shelley's Frankenstein is a 1995 pinball machine released by Sega Pinball in January 1995. It is based on the film of the same name.

When the player started the game they could choose between the film soundtrack, or "Frankenstein".

== Design ==
The game was produced shortly after Sega has taken over Data East and uses much of Data East's technology, but uses a larger display. The operating menu includes a gore setting. Sonic the Hedgehog is shown in attract mode.

== Layout ==
The game uses three full-size flippers, two of which are at the bottom in the normal position while the third is located farther up the table. Other features include two regular-size triangular slingshots at the bottom of the table, along with an 'alive' kickback ball save at the left outlane. There are no under-the-playfield tunnels, but the game features two scoops; the Geneva scoop (lower) and the Sarcophagus scoop (upper).

Four pop-bumpers can be found on the left side of the table, near an 'Ice-cave'; a small hole which, when targeted, will give the player a random bonus as well as relighting the alive kickback (if, already, unlit). There is a ramp at the back of the table which feeds the left inlane. Next to that, there is the "North Pole" VUK (Vertical up Kicker) which kicks up into a ramp that feeds the right inlane. The toy in this game is a model of Frankenstein's monster which, during 'Creature Multiball', will throw a ball down onto the playfield. The initial concept of a ball-throwing monster was from an earlier John Borg designed machine, Jurassic Park, which used a ball-eating dinosaur instead.

== Gameplay ==
The purpose of Mary Shelley's Frankenstein pinball is to finish eight scenes indicated in a circular pattern on the playfield in order to engage a 6-ball multiball wizard mode after finishing all other modes:

- Frankenstein Millions: Shoot all 12 FRANKENSTEIN letters within 30 seconds.
- Stoning: Shoot a total of around 50-60 switches to collect a CREATION letter.
- Creature Feature: The player has 30 seconds to spell CREATURE by shooting the ramp eight times.
- Lynch Justine: Shoot the Left Lane for 3 consecutive hurry-ups.
- North Pole: Shoot the North Pole VUK for a hurry-up starting at 90M.
- Light Extra Ball: Extra ball is lit at the North Pole.
- Voltage Mode: Shoot the ramp for 20M, then the North Pole for 30M, then the Ice Cave for 40M, then the Left Lane for 50M.
- Graveyard: Make a monster by collecting two arms, two legs, a torso, and a head from the various holes.

As well as these modes there are also two separate multiball modes. 'Geneva multi-ball' is a three-ball multi-ball mode and is started by shooting the ball into the 'Geneva' scoop while the Geneva light is activated. 'Creature multiball' is begun by looping the 'Creature ramp' a number of times and then shooting 'North Pole'. This triggers two ball multi-play which can, then, be upgraded to as much as a six ball multi-ball by shooting for the 'North Pole' once again followed by any jackpot shot.

== Reception ==
A review for The Flipside appreciated the sound, art package, and range of shots. The large display was also found to enhance the game. Repeating creature multiball was found to be most of the strategy for a high score, especially by skilled players.

A review for Pinball Player compared it to Dracula, finding the artwork to be better on this game, and the sounds to be good, but the sound system worse. It was influenced by prior John Borg games, with complex multiballs similar to Tales from the Crypt, and the layout similar to Jurassic Park.

== Digital versions ==
Mary Shelley's Frankenstein was released as a licensed table for The Pinball Arcade in October 2015. Some Sega logos and the Sonic the Hedgehog cameo were removed, but it retains the song "Frankenstein" by Edgar Winter Group.

The table was also released for Stern Pinball Arcade for free. It included the same changes as in The Pinball Arcade.
