= Starship Troopers (pinball) =

1997 pinball machine

- Manufacturer: Sega Pinball
- Release date: December 1997
- System: Sega/Stern Whitestar
- Players: 1-6
- Design: Joe Balcer, Joe Kaminkow
- Programming: Neil Falconer, Orin Day
- Artwork: Morgan Weistling
- Music: Brian Schmidt

Starship Troopers is a pinball arcade game released by Sega Pinball in December 1997. The game is based on the 1997 film of the same name.

== Description ==
The player as a member of the mobile infantry has to free six bug-infested planets and then to capture the Brain Bug. There are different species of insects: Warriors, Plasma Bugs, Hoppers and Tankers.

The game has several multiball modes and very fast gameplay. The playfield contains a moving Warrior Bug and a Brain Bug pop-up.

The video mode is guessing a playing card which awards a "special" for an exact guess, and points for correctly guessing the suit.

== Digital versions ==
Starship Troopers is available as a licensed table in The Pinball Arcade. Sega logos and a cameo by Sonic the Hedgehog in the match sequence are removed from the table because of licensing issues.

The table was also released for Stern Pinball Arcade. As in the Pinball Arcade, Sega logos and Sonic the Hedgehog cameo were removed.
