= The Phantom of the Opera (pinball) =

1990 pinball machine

- Manufacturer: Data East
- Release date: January 1990
- System: DataEast/Sega Version 2
- Design: Joe Kaminkow, Ed Cebula
- Programming: Lonnie D. Ropp
- Artwork: Paul Faris
- Music: Kyle Johnson
- Production run: 2,750

The Phantom of the Opera is a pinball machine released by Data East in 1990. The game is based on the 1910 French novel The Phantom of the Opera by Gaston Leroux, but not based on the 1986 musical by Andrew Lloyd Webber or movie of the same name. The game was designed by Joe Kaminkow and Ed Cebula.

== Design ==
The game started to be designed in November 1988, just as the book was being re-issued, and a month before The Phantom of the Opera miniseries was announced.

The main feature of the game is the organ ramp.

The music begins with a version of Bach's Tocatta and Fugue in D minor and then progresses to "up-tempo variations".

=== Artwork ===
The artwork for the machine was produced by art designer Paul Faris, working as a freelancer. The artist had free rein to create images based on his interpretation of the book, unlike many other Data East pinball machines where the choice of artwork was restricted by a licensor. Gary Stern and Ed Cebula are both shown on the backglass; Faris' daughter is the model for the character Christine Daaé. The Phantom can be unmasked to reveal his true face on the backglass. This uses special printing changing the opacity of the ink, and a lighting technique designed by Paul Faris to provide "visual removal of the mask".

== Gameplay ==
The main goal of the game is to open the secret passage below the organ, to unmask the Phantom and activate a three ball multiball.

On the last ball of a game, the player can double their score by shooting the catwalk ramp.

== Reception ==
Play Meter found it to be a challenging game with artwork too gory for the taste of the reviewer, rating it at 2.5/5. In a following issue the designer explained some of the details in the artwork including the hanging figure of Joseph Buquet.

== Digital versions ==
The Phantom of the Opera was released as a licensed table for The Pinball Arcade in 2014, and Stern Pinball Arcade in 2016. Data East logos are removed due to licensing issues.

== Legacy ==
This game is credited with making Data East pinball profitable, enabling the company to continue to survive.
