= Beavis and Butt-Head (video game) =

1994 video game

- Print advertisement, covering the Super NES, Genesis and Game Gear versions.
- Developers: Radical Entertainment (GEN/MD); Realtime Associates (SNES); NuFX (GG); Torus Games (GB)
- Publishers: Viacom New Media; GT Interactive (Game Boy)
- Composers: Eric Swanson and Greg Turner (SNES); Marc Baril and Paul Wilkinson (Genesis/Mega Drive); Matt Scott (Game Gear)
- Series: Beavis and Butt-Head
- Platforms: Genesis/Mega Drive, Super NES, Game Gear, Game Boy
- Release: Game Gear, Genesis, SNES: NA: October 1994; EU: August 14, 1995; Game Boy: NA: 1998
- Genre: Action
- Modes: Single-player, multiplayer

Beavis and Butt-Head (advertised as MTV's Beavis and Butt-Head: The Game) are three tie-in video games based on the animated television series of the same name that were released by Viacom New Media in 1994 for the Super NES, Genesis/Mega Drive and Game Gear. The three versions differ from each other, sharing only the basic premise involving the titular characters searching for tickets to a Gwar concert. The games were advertised as featuring music by the band. A fourth version was later released for the Game Boy by GT Interactive in 1998 without the Gwar tie-in.

== Premise ==
It is based on MTV's animated series of the same name, and follows the title characters Beavis and Butt-Head as they attempt to find their torn-up Gwar concert tickets scattered across the town of Highland.

== Development ==
The Super NES version was developed by Realtime Associates, the Game Gear version by NuFX, and the Genesis/Mega Drive version by Radical Entertainment, all which were published by Viacom New Media and released in 1994. A Game Boy version was released in 1998, developed by Torus Games and published by GT Interactive, which revolved around the boys trying to join Todd's gang.

== Reception ==
Reception

Review scores
| Publication | Score |
|---|---|
| Electronic Gaming Monthly | 5.2 / 10 (GEN) |
| Next Generation | 1/5 (GEN) |

Reviewing the Genesis version, GamePro commented that "Beavis and Butt-Head is for gamers who possess both thumb speed and the patience to undertake a lengthy junk hunt to crack obscure puzzles." They criticized the extensive trial-and-error involved in obtaining items, but praised the controls and the visual style's coherence with the look of the TV show. Electronic Gaming Monthly assessed that fans of the TV show would probably like the game, but that anyone else would definitely not like it. Next Generation stated that "Beavis and Butt-Head is a game that shows while moronic humor and plenty of flatulence may make great TV, it stinks as a game."

GamePro's review of the Super NES version was subdued, commenting that the game "doesn't suck, but it doesn't rule either." They again praised the controls and the game's recreation of the TV show's look, but described the gameplay as "straightforward but uninspired".
