= Guns N' Roses (pinball) =

1994 pinball machine

- Manufacturer: Data East
- Release date: June 1994
- System: Data East Ver. 3B (BSMT2000 & 128 X 32 display)
- Design: Joe Kaminkow, John Borg, Lyman Sheats, Slash
- Programming: Lonnie D. Ropp, Orin Day, Lyman Sheats
- Artwork: Markus Rothkranz
- Music: Axl Rose, Slash, Gilby Clarke, Brian L. Schmidt
- Sound: Axl Rose, Slash, Gilby Clarke, Brian L. Schmidt
- Production run: 3,000

Guns N' Roses is a 1994 pinball machine made by Data East featuring the hard rock group Guns N' Roses. It is the final pinball machine released under the Data East name. Elements of the game design were conceived of by Slash, with the playfield designed by John Borg. The game includes a mode named after each of the six band members, and includes several Guns N' Roses songs.

In 2020 a second Guns N' Roses pinball machine was released by Jersey Jack Pinball.

== Design ==
Slash, a noted pinball fan, was involved in the game's design. He approached Data East about developing a machine after being impressed with their Jurassic Park pinball machine. Slash stated in a 2020 interview, "I totally was going after my own idea and didn’t use any of those [other band themed] machines as inspiration." Parts of the game conceived of by Slash include the G and R ramps to collect band members, and the snake pit. The playfield was designed by John Borg. After Slash noted that Gilby Clark loved motorcycles Borg conceived of a video mode which was programmed by Lyman Sheats.

Other band members, including Duff McKagan recorded dedicated callouts to accompany the gameplay. After a four hour recording session Axl Rose produced very few usable voice lines.

The game includes several songs including "Welcome to the Jungle", "Sweet Child of Mine", "Paradise City", "Night Train", "My Michelle", "It's so Easy", "Patience", and "Garden of Eden". The soundtrack also includes the previously unreleased song "Ain't Going Down".

The playfield artwork incorporates the Guns N' Roses seal, and Axl Rose's tattoos, featured in the Appetite for Destruction album artwork.

Each game included a poster signed by Slash.

== Layout ==
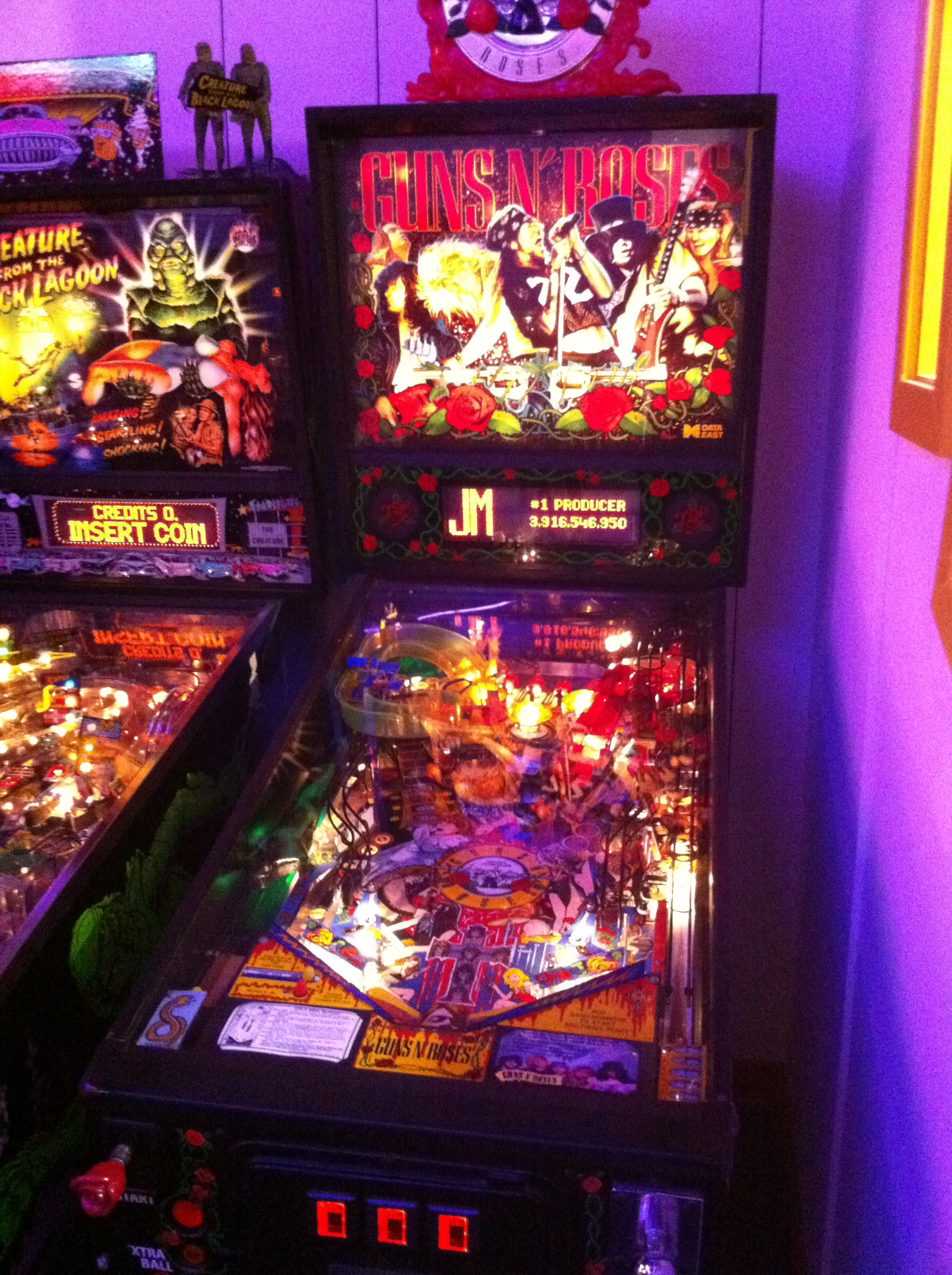
Guns N' Roses pinball

The main plunger uses a gun trigger, with a manual second plunger on the left side of the machine with a rose shaped handle, tying in with the Guns N' Roses theme.

The game includes three rollovers at the top of the machine spelling J-A-M; these are above a group of three pop bumpers. The game has two ramps: the left ramp loops back in the shape of the letter G and the right ramp resembles the letter R. The left ramp can divert the ball to the left shooter lane called the snake pit; balls launched from here are sent into a whirlpool funnel at the top of the playfield. To the left of the entrance of the left ramp is a channel leading to a saucer used to start modes; below this is a third flipper. The game also includes two banks of three drop targets, and a captive ball.

The machine uses a group of three magnets underneath the playfield to fling balls around unpredictably.

== Gameplay ==
The game includes six modes based on the band members: Gilby Rolls video mode, Slash Solo, Matt Scoring, Duff Rocks, Dizzy Ball, and Axl 3-ball. After these and three other features have been completed the player can start the wizard mode, called Riot; this is a six ball mode, with the balls representing the six band members. Skilled players can score a jackpot worth 1 billion points. During the video mode the player controls a motorcycle on the DMD and dodges cars, but tries to hit pedestrians.

The game also has another main multiball mode where the player repeatedly hits a shot to collect band members, and when all six band members are collected a four- or six-ball multiball can be started.

The game includes a setting for the woman shown in the match sequence at the end of a game to be topless or not.

== Reception and legacy ==
In a review for The Flipside the game was found to have knock-out sound, deep multiball play, and whilst initially fun lacked the depth of some competing games.

Each member of the band received a free pinball machine. Former Guns N' Roses guitarist Gilby Clarke sued the band over the use of his likeness in the game, as he had been a member of the band when the machine was under development but had left by the time it was released. In 2020 Jersey Jack Pinball produced a new pinball machine, Guns N' Roses: Not in This Lifetime.

In 2018 the game was included in an exhibit of rock 'n' roll pinball machines at the Rock and Roll Hall of Fame museum.
