= Crüe Ball =

1992 video game

- European cover art
- Developer: NuFX
- Publishers: WW: Electronic Arts; JP: Electronic Arts Victor
- Producer: Richard Robbins
- Designer: Mark Weston Sprenger
- Programmer: Lou Haehn
- Artist: Mark Weston Sprenger
- Composer: Brian L. Schmidt
- Platform: Genesis
- Release: NA: November 1992; EU: November 19, 1992; JP: December 26, 1993
- Genre: Pinball
- Modes: Single-player, multiplayer

Crüe Ball is a 1992 pinball video game developed by American studio NuFX and published by Electronic Arts for the Sega Genesis. Themed to glam metal band Mötley Crüe, it features three of their songs: "Dr. Feelgood," "Live Wire," and "Home Sweet Home."

The game's prototype name was Twisted Flipper. The producer of the game, Richard Robbins, initially pursued the name Headbangers Ball, but MTV balked at a license and Mötley Crüe was added relatively late in development.

This game was designed by Mark Sprenger (artist for Space Shuttle, High Speed, and Diner) and Brian L. Schmidt (composer for Space Station and Black Knight 2000). The game was awarded the Sega Seal of Quality Award for Best Sound at the Consumer Electronics Show.

== Reception ==
Reception

Review scores
Publication	Score
Computer and Video Games	78%
GamePro	5/5
Mean Machines	74%
MegaTech	70%

A review for Mean Machines found the inertia of the ball realistic, but lacked variety, comparing it unfavourably with Dragon's Fury. In a CVG review it was called "the second best Megadrive pinball game around - out of two!".
