= Professional and Amateur Pinball Association =

Competitive pinball organization

The Professional and Amateur Pinball Association (PAPA) is an organization supporting the game of pinball as a recreational and competitive sport. PAPA is currently a brand owned by the Replay Foundation and is operated by the IFPA under license and is based in the Pittsburgh area.

The main activity of the organization is hosting the annual World Pinball Championships and Pinburgh Match-Play Championship. Each event brings hundreds of serious pinball players from around the world to compete for a number of large cash prizes. The World Pinball Championships run for four days and allow competitors to register in different divisions which accommodate beginners and skilled players alike. Each occurrence of the World Pinball Championships has been denoted by a number; for example, the 2010 tournament is known as PAPA 13.

The Pinburgh Match-Play Championship resurrects the name given to a previous Pittsburgh-area pinball tournament, and has a different structure. Players pay one entry fee and compete in multiple rounds directly against other players for two days, before a day of finals is played in three divisions, along with a consolation tournament for players who do not make the finals.

== History ==
PAPA was originally created by Roger Sharpe, author of the book Pinball! (E.P. Dutton 1977) and Steve Epstein, owner of the former Broadway Arcade in Manhattan. After gathering data over about 4 years they developed the league scoring system used in PAPA league play. PAPA 6 was the last tournament organized under the tenure of Steve Epstein. The PAPA organization was transferred to Kevin Martin in January 2004 and its moniker applied to the pinball tournaments formerly held under the name of Pinburgh; PAPA 7 was the first of these, held in 2004.

In September 2004, shortly after PAPA 7, the remnants of Hurricane Ivan flooded the tournament area, ruining 232 pinball machines. However, the organizers managed to restock and rebuild in time to host PAPA 8 in 2005.

In 2012 ownership of all 456 pinball machines with a few other machines was transferred to the Replay Foundation, with the building transferred a year later.

In November 2020, the Replay Foundation announced that it is discontinuing its events and use of the PAPA brand indefinitely, due to the pandemic. It relaunched tournaments under the Pinburgh name in 2024, and licensed the IFPA to run tournaments under the PAPA name.

== Tournament format ==
The format of the World Pinball Championships has changed over time. In the current format, players declare a division (A, B, or C, with A being the most skilled) and may enter as many times as they like, paying entry fees each time they choose to play. During an entry, a player will choose and play a certain number of games from a predetermined bank of machines (for example, five out of a possible nine machines). Each game score is assigned a point value based on how it compares to all of the other entries on that same machine: 100 points for the highest score, down to 1 point for 88th place, and 0 points for all lower scores. This point value may decrease over time as more games are played by everyone. An entry's overall score is the sum of these point values; thus, it too can decrease over time.

A player's best entry over the course of the qualifying period determines the player's qualifying score, and the qualifying scores are used to determine the rank of each player. A player's rank may go up or down, even without continuing to play more entries. There is a fair amount of strategy that can be employed to deal with this.

At the end of the qualifying period (typically several days), the top-ranked players in each division (the actual number varies) compete in a head-to-head, bracketed format to determine the winners.

The tournament also includes a Juniors division (16 years or younger), a Seniors division (50 years or older), and a Classics division that runs on multiple days of the event. In 2014, the Juniors division was changed to be three tournaments run on consecutive days, similar to the Classics division.

In 2015 a D division was added, specifically targeting very new players who had only played a limited amount of competitive pinball. In order to qualify for D division, a player needed to have a world ranking of 7500 or lower.

In 2018 and 2019, and from 2024 onwards the Women's International Pinball Tournament (WIPT) was added in parallel to the Pinburgh event at Replay FX, utilizing the Pinburgh format.

== Tournament machine configurations ==
If possible, the game software of each machine is put into tournament mode. Typically, this means that the rules will avoid giving random awards, so that scores reflect mostly skill and not luck. Also, extra balls are disabled if the software supports it.

The physical setup of the machines is also configured to make things as challenging as possible. This can be done in a number of ways, for example:

- Adjusting or removing outlane posts, which make the side drain gaps larger.
- Increasing the playfield angle (by adjusting the legs on the cabinet). This increases ball speed and makes it more difficult to make shots in the back of the playfield.
- Making the "tilt" mechanism more strict, allowing less nudging and shaking of the machine.

== List of tournament winners ==
Pinburgh Match-Play

- Pinburgh 2011 – Keith Elwin (USA) – (3/20/2011 – PAPA World Headquarters, Scott Township, PA)
- Pinburgh 2012 – Adam Becker (CAN) – (4/1/2012 – PAPA World Headquarters, Scott Township, PA)
- Pinburgh 2013 – Keith Elwin (USA) – (4/11/2013 – PAPA World Headquarters, Scott Township, PA)
- Pinburgh 2014 – Jim Belsito (USA) – (3/30/2014 – PAPA World Headquarters, Scott Township, PA)
- Pinburgh 2015 – Zach Sharpe (USA) – (8/2/2015 – David L. Lawrence Convention Center, Pittsburgh, PA)
- Pinburgh 2016 – Keith Elwin (USA) – (7/30/2016 – David L. Lawrence Convention Center, Pittsburgh, PA)
- Pinburgh 2017 – Colin MacAlpine (USA) – (7/29/2017 – David L. Lawrence Convention Center, Pittsburgh, PA)
- Pinburgh 2018 – Keith Elwin (USA) – (7/28/2018 – David L. Lawrence Convention Center, Pittsburgh, PA)
- Pinburgh 2019 – Keith Elwin (USA) – (8/3/2019 – David L. Lawrence Convention Center, Pittsburgh, PA)
- Pinburgh 2024 - Jason Zahler (USA) - (7/28/2024 - Rezzanine Esports facility, Bridgeville, PA)
- Pinburgh 2025 - Jason Zahler (USA) - (7/27/2025 - Rezzanine Esports facility, Bridgeville, PA)

A Division

- PAPA 1 – Joey Cartagena (USA) – (2/2/1991 – Lone Star Roadhouse, New York, NY)
- PAPA 2 – Rick Stetta (USA) – (2/2/1992 – Lone Star Roadhouse, New York, NY)
- PAPA 3 – Lyman Sheats (USA) – (2/13/1993 – Omni Park Central Hotel, New York, NY)
- PAPA 4 – Bowen Kerins (USA) – (2/8/1994 – Omni Park Central Hotel, New York, NY)
- PAPA 5 – Paul Madison (USA) – (2/5/1995 – Omni Park Central Hotel, New York, NY)
- PAPA 6 – Keith Elwin (USA) – (2/8/1998 – Sahara Hotel, Las Vegas, NV)
- PAPA 7 – Lyman Sheats (USA) – (9/12/2004 – PAPA World Headquarters, Scott Township, PA)
- PAPA 8 – Bowen Kerins (USA) – (8/14/2005 – PAPA World Headquarters, Scott Township, PA)
- PAPA 9 – Lyman Sheats (USA) – (8/20/2006 – PAPA World Headquarters, Scott Township, PA)
- PAPA 10 – Jorian Engelbrektsson (SWE) – (10/14/2007 – PAPA World Headquarters, Scott Township, PA)
- PAPA 11 – Keith Elwin (USA) – (8/17/2008 – PAPA World Headquarters, Scott Township, PA)
- PAPA 12 – Keith Elwin (USA) – (8/16/2009 – PAPA World Headquarters, Scott Township, PA)
- PAPA 13 – Keith Elwin (USA) – (8/15/2010 – PAPA World Headquarters, Scott Township, PA)
- PAPA 14 – Andrei Massenkoff (USA) – (8/14/2011 – PAPA World Headquarters, Scott Township, PA)
- PAPA 15 – Keith Elwin (USA) – (8/12/2012 – PAPA World Headquarters, Scott Township, PA)
- PAPA 16 – Bowen Kerins (USA) – (8/11/2013 – PAPA World Headquarters, Scott Township, PA)
- PAPA 17 – Cayle George (USA) – (8/17/2014 – PAPA World Headquarters, Scott Township, PA)
- PAPA 18 – Keith Elwin (USA) – (3/15/2015 – PAPA World Headquarters, Scott Township, PA)
- PAPA 19 – Robert Gagno (CAN) – (4/10/2016 – PAPA World Headquarters, Scott Township, PA)
- PAPA 20 – Escher Lefkoff (USA) – (4/9/2017 – PAPA World Headquarters, Scott Township, PA)
- PAPA 21 - Raymond Davidson (USA)
- PAPA 22 - Zach McCarthy (USA) - (9/7/2025 - Enterrium, Schaumburg, IL)

B Division

- PAPA 3 – A.J. Fried (USA) – (2/13/1993 – Omni Park Central Hotel, New York, NY)
- PAPA 4 – Kevin Kulek (USA) – (2/8/1994 – Omni Park Central Hotel, New York, NY)
- PAPA 5 – Dominic Nardini (USA) – (February 3–5, 1995 – Omni Park Central Hotel, New York, NY)
- PAPA 6 – Tim Morse (USA) – (2/8/1998 – Sahara Hotel, Las Vegas, NV)
- PAPA 7 – Andrei Massenkoff (USA) – (9/12/2004 – PAPA World Headquarters, Scott Township, PA)
- PAPA 8 – Helena Walter (SWE) – (8/14/2005 – PAPA World Headquarters, Scott Township, PA)
- PAPA 9 – Darren Kamnitzer (USA) – (8/20/2006 – PAPA World Headquarters, Scott Township, PA)
- PAPA 10 – Adam Becker (CAN) – (10/14/2007 – PAPA World Headquarters, Scott Township, PA)
- PAPA 11 – Maurice Pelletier (CAN) – (8/17/2008 – PAPA World Headquarters, Scott Township, PA)
- PAPA 12 – Ed Zeltmann (USA) – (8/16/2009 – PAPA World Headquarters, Scott Township, PA)
- PAPA 13 – Joshua Henderson (USA) – (8/15/2010 – PAPA World Headquarters, Scott Township, PA)
- PAPA 14 – Dave Hegge (USA) – (8/14/2011 – PAPA World Headquarters, Scott Township, PA)
- PAPA 15 – Johnny Modica (USA) – (8/12/2012 – PAPA World Headquarters, Scott Township, PA)
- PAPA 16 – John Flitton (CAN) – (8/11/2013 – PAPA World Headquarters, Scott Township, PA)
- PAPA 17 – Rod Lawrence (USA) – (8/17/2014 – PAPA World Headquarters, Scott Township, PA)
- PAPA 18 – Joseph Lemire (USA) – (3/15/2015 – PAPA World Headquarters, Scott Township, PA)
- PAPA 19 – Steve Zumoff (USA) – (4/10/2016 – PAPA World Headquarters, Scott Township, PA)
- PAPA 20 – Jordan Tredaway (Australia) – (4/9/2017 – PAPA World Headquarters, Scott Township, PA)
- PAPA 21 - Spencer Imboden (USA) - (9/8/2024 - Enterrium, Schaumburg, IL)
- PAPA 22 - Matthew Larsen (USA) - (9/7/2025 - Enterrium, Schaumburg, IL)

C Division

- PAPA 3 – Kevin Rodriguez (USA) – (2/13/1993 – Omni Park Central Hotel, New York, NY)
- PAPA 4 – Kim Hilker (USA) – (2/8/1994 – Omni Park Central Hotel, New York, NY)
- PAPA 5 – Steve Walker (USA) – (February 3–5, 1995 – Omni Park Central Hotel, New York, NY)
- PAPA 6 – Steve Marsh (USA) – (2/8/1998 – Sahara Hotel, Las Vegas, NV)
- PAPA 7 – Russ Wallis (USA) – (9/12/2004 – PAPA World Headquarters, Scott Township, PA)
- PAPA 8 – Jory Rabinovitz (USA) – (8/14/2005 – PAPA World Headquarters, Scott Township, PA)
- PAPA 9 – Mark Salas (USA) – (8/20/2006 – PAPA World Headquarters, Scott Township, PA)
- PAPA 10 – Johnny Modica (USA) – (10/14/2007 – PAPA World Headquarters, Scott Township, PA)
- PAPA 11 – Mike Clinton (CAN) – (8/17/2008 – PAPA World Headquarters, Scott Township, PA)
- PAPA 12 – Blair Love (USA) – (8/16/2009 – PAPA World Headquarters, Scott Township, PA)
- PAPA 13 – Seth Lettofsky (USA) – (8/15/2010 – PAPA World Headquarters, Scott Township, PA)
- PAPA 14 – Chuck Jackson (USA) – (8/14/2011 – PAPA World Headquarters, Scott Township, PA)
- PAPA 15 – Jay Collins (USA) – (8/12/2012 – PAPA World Headquarters, Scott Township, PA)
- PAPA 16 – Nick Campbell (USA) – (8/11/2013 – PAPA World Headquarters, Scott Township, PA)
- PAPA 17 – Jack Benson (USA) – (8/17/2014 – PAPA World Headquarters, Scott Township, PA)
- PAPA 18 – Levi Nayman (USA) – (3/15/2015 – PAPA World Headquarters, Scott Township, PA)
- PAPA 19 – Lydia Lewis (USA) – (4/10/2016 – PAPA World Headquarters, Scott Township, PA)
- PAPA 20 – Bayless Rutherford (USA) – (4/9/2017 – PAPA World Headquarters, Scott Township, PA)

D Division

- PAPA 18 – Mike Hovraluck (USA) – (3/15/2015 – PAPA World Headquarters, Scott Township, PA)
- PAPA 19 – Alex Fruzynski (USA) – (4/10/2016 – PAPA World Headquarters, Scott Township, PA)
- PAPA 20 – Blake Wood (USA) – (4/9/2017 – PAPA World Headquarters, Scott Township, PA)

Junior Division

- PAPA 3 – Willy McKinney (USA) – (2/13/1993 – Omni Park Central Hotel, New York, NY)
- PAPA 4 – Vincent Chasmer (USA) - (2/5/1995 – Omni Park Central Hotel, New York, NY)
- PAPA 5 – Joshua Sharpe (USA) - (2/5/1995 – Omni Park Central Hotel, New York, NY)
- PAPA 6 – Zachary Sharpe (USA) – (2/8/1998 – Sahara Hotel, Las Vegas, NV)
- PAPA 7 – Jake Prince (USA) – (9/12/2004 – PAPA World Headquarters, Scott Township, PA)
- PAPA 8 – Matt Hogue (USA) – (8/14/2005 – PAPA World Headquarters, Scott Township, PA)
- PAPA 9 – Ethan Blonder (USA) – (8/20/2006 – PAPA World Headquarters, Scott Township, PA)
- PAPA 10 – Ethan Blonder (USA) – (10/14/2007 – PAPA World Headquarters, Scott Township, PA)
- PAPA 11 – Ethan Blonder (USA) – (8/17/2008 – PAPA World Headquarters, Scott Township, PA)
- PAPA 12 – Justin Ortscheid (USA) – (8/16/2009 – PAPA World Headquarters, Scott Township, PA)
- PAPA 13 – Justin Ortscheid (USA) – (8/15/2010 – PAPA World Headquarters, Scott Township, PA)
- PAPA 14 – Escher Lefkoff (USA) – (8/14/2011 – PAPA World Headquarters, Scott Township, PA)
- PAPA 15 – Joshua Henderson (USA) – (8/12/2012 – PAPA World Headquarters, Scott Township, PA)
- PAPA 16 – Escher Lefkoff (USA) – (8/11/2013 – PAPA World Headquarters, Scott Township, PA)
- PAPA 17 – Juniors 1 – Escher Lefkoff (USA) – (8/14/2014 – PAPA World Headquarters, Scott Township, PA)
- PAPA 17 – Juniors 2 – Escher Lefkoff (USA) – (8/15/2014 – PAPA World Headquarters, Scott Township, PA)
- PAPA 17 – Juniors 3 – Escher Lefkoff (USA) – (8/16/2014 – PAPA World Headquarters, Scott Township, PA)
- PAPA 18 – Juniors 1 – Jason Zahler (USA) – (3/12/2015 – PAPA World Headquarters, Scott Township, PA)
- PAPA 18 – Juniors 2 – Escher Lefkoff (USA) – (3/13/2015 – PAPA World Headquarters, Scott Township, PA)
- PAPA 18 – Juniors 3 – Jason Zahler (USA) – (3/14/2015 – PAPA World Headquarters, Scott Township, PA)
- PAPA 19 – Juniors 1 – Aleksander Kaczmarczyk (USA) – (4/7/2016 – PAPA World Headquarters, Scott Township, PA)
- PAPA 19 – Juniors 2 – Gregory Kennedy (USA) – (4/8/2016 – PAPA World Headquarters, Scott Township, PA)
- PAPA 19 – Juniors 3 – Ciaran Bernard (USA) – (4/9/2016 – PAPA World Headquarters, Scott Township, PA)

Senior Division

- PAPA 7 – Ed Hershey (USA) – (9/12/2004 – PAPA World Headquarters, Scott Township, PA)
- PAPA 8 – Ed Hershey (USA) – (8/14/2004 – PAPA World Headquarters, Scott Township, PA)
- PAPA 9 – Rick Prince (USA) – (8/20/2006 – PAPA World Headquarters, Scott Township, PA)
- PAPA 10 – John Reuter (USA) – (10/14/2007 – PAPA World Headquarters, Scott Township, PA)
- PAPA 11 – Ed Hershey (USA) – (8/17/2008 – PAPA World Headquarters, Scott Township, PA)
- PAPA 12 – Rick Prince (USA) – (8/16/2009 – PAPA World Headquarters, Scott Township, PA)
- PAPA 13 – Rick Prince (USA) – (8/15/2010 – PAPA World Headquarters, Scott Township, PA)
- PAPA 14 – Dave Hegge (USA) – (8/14/2011 – PAPA World Headquarters, Scott Township, PA)
- PAPA 15 – Paul McGlone (USA) – (8/12/2012 – PAPA World Headquarters, Scott Township, PA)
- PAPA 16 – Dave Hegge (USA) – (8/11/2013 – PAPA World Headquarters, Scott Township, PA)
- PAPA 17 – Steve Walker (USA) – (8/16/2014 – PAPA World Headquarters, Scott Township, PA)
- PAPA 18 – Robert Sutter (CHE) – (3/14/2015 – PAPA World Headquarters, Scott Township, PA)
- PAPA 19 – Phil Harmon (USA) – (4/9/2016 – PAPA World Headquarters, Scott Township, PA)

Classics Division

- PAPA 7 – Classics 1 – Keith Elwin (USA) – (9/10/2004 – PAPA World Headquarters, Scott Township, PA)
- PAPA 7 – Classics 2 – Steven Epstein (USA) – (9/11/2004 – PAPA World Headquarters, Scott Township, PA)
- PAPA 8 – Classics 1 – Ed Hershey (USA) – (8/12/2005 – PAPA World Headquarters, Scott Township, PA)
- PAPA 8 – Classics 2 – Keith Elwin (USA) – (8/13/2005 – PAPA World Headquarters, Scott Township, PA)
- PAPA 9 – Classics 1 – Neil Shatz (USA) – (8/18/2006 – PAPA World Headquarters, Scott Township, PA)
- PAPA 9 – Classics 2 – Keith Elwin (USA) – (8/19/2006 – PAPA World Headquarters, Scott Township, PA)
- PAPA 10 – Classics 1 – Rick Prince (USA) – (10/12/2007 – PAPA World Headquarters, Scott Township, PA)
- PAPA 10 – Classics 2 – Bowen Kerins (USA) – (10/13/2007 – PAPA World Headquarters, Scott Township, PA)
- PAPA 11 – Classics 1 – Neil Shatz (USA) – (8/15/2008 – PAPA World Headquarters, Scott Township, PA)
- PAPA 11 – Classics 2 – Adam Lefkoff (USA) – (8/16/2008 – PAPA World Headquarters, Scott Township, PA)
- PAPA 12 – Classics 1 – Bowen Kerins (USA) – (8/14/2009 – PAPA World Headquarters, Scott Township, PA)
- PAPA 12 – Classics 2 – Keith Johnson (USA) – (8/15/2009 – PAPA World Headquarters, Scott Township, PA)
- PAPA 13 – Classics 1 – Dave Hegge (USA) – (8/13/2010 – PAPA World Headquarters, Scott Township, PA)
- PAPA 13 – Classics 2 – Josh Sharpe (USA) – (8/14/2010 – PAPA World Headquarters, Scott Township, PA)
- PAPA 14 – Classics 1 – Trent Augenstein (USA) – (8/12/2011 – PAPA World Headquarters, Scott Township, PA)
- PAPA 14 – Classics 2 – Robert Gagno (CAN) – (8/13/2011 – PAPA World Headquarters, Scott Township, PA)
- PAPA 14 – Classics 3 – Keith Elwin (USA) – (8/14/2011 – PAPA World Headquarters, Scott Township, PA)
- PAPA 15 – Classics 1 – Zach Sharpe (USA) – (8/12/2012 – PAPA World Headquarters, Scott Township, PA)
- PAPA 15 – Classics 2 – Lyman F Sheats Jr (USA) – (8/12/2012 – PAPA World Headquarters, Scott Township, PA)
- PAPA 15 – Classics 3 – Zach Sharpe (USA) – (8/12/2012 – PAPA World Headquarters, Scott Township, PA)
- PAPA 16 – Classics 1 – Frank Romero (USA) – (8/8/2013 – PAPA World Headquarters, Scott Township, PA)
- PAPA 16 – Classics 2 – Daniele Acciari (ITA) – (8/9/2013 – PAPA World Headquarters, Scott Township, PA)
- PAPA 16 – Classics 3 – Eden Stamm (CAN) – (8/10/2013 – PAPA World Headquarters, Scott Township, PA)
- PAPA 17 – Classics 1 – Bowen Kerins (USA) – (8/14/2014 – PAPA World Headquarters, Scott Township, PA)
- PAPA 17 – Classics 2 – Cayle George (USA) – (8/15/2014 – PAPA World Headquarters, Scott Township, PA)
- PAPA 17 – Classics 3 – Keith Elwin (USA) – (8/16/2014 – PAPA World Headquarters, Scott Township, PA)
- PAPA 18 – Classics 1 – Andy Rosa (USA) – (3/12/2015 – PAPA World Headquarters, Scott Township, PA)
- PAPA 18 – Classics 2 – Mats Runsten (SWE) – (3/13/2015 – PAPA World Headquarters, Scott Township, PA)
- PAPA 18 – Classics 3 – Jerry Bernard (USA) – (3/14/2015 – PAPA World Headquarters, Scott Township, PA)
- PAPA 19 – Classics 1 – Bowen Kerins (USA) – (4/7/2016 – PAPA World Headquarters, Scott Township, PA)
- PAPA 19 – Classics 2 – Keith Elwin (USA) – (4/8/2016 – PAPA World Headquarters, Scott Township, PA)
- PAPA 19 – Classics 3 – Bowen Kerins (USA) – (4/9/2016 – PAPA World Headquarters, Scott Township, PA)
- PAPA 20 – Classics 1 – Zach Sharpe (USA) – (4/6/2017 – PAPA World Headquarters, Scott Township, PA)
- PAPA 20 – Classics 2 – Greg DeFeo (USA) – (4/7/2017 – PAPA World Headquarters, Scott Township, PA)
- PAPA 20 – Classics 3 – David Riel (USA) – (4/8/2017 – PAPA World Headquarters, Scott Township, PA)

Split Flipper Division

- PAPA 18 – Josh Sharpe (USA) & Zach Sharpe (USA) – (3/14/2015 – PAPA World Headquarters, Scott Township, PA)
- PAPA 19 – Brett Goodwin (AU) & Naiomi Goodwin (AU) – (4/9/2016 – PAPA World Headquarters, Scott Township, PA)

Women's Division

- PAPA 4 – Ellen Frankel (USA) – (2/8/1994 – Omni Park Central Hotel, New York, NY)
- PAPA 5 – Natalie Baker (USA) – (February 3–5, 1995 – Omni Park Central Hotel, New York, NY)
- PAPA 6 - Alysa Parks (USA) – (2/8/1998 – Sahara Hotel, Las Vegas, NV)
- PAPA 19 – Sunshine Bon (USA) – (4/9/2016 – PAPA World Headquarters, Scott Township, PA)
