= Apollo 13 (pinball) =

1995 pinball machine

'Apollo 13'
- Manufacturer: Sega Pinball
- Release date: October 1995
- System: Sega WhiteStar
- Design: Joe Kaminkow, Joe Balcer
- Programming: Lonnie D. Ropp, Orin Day
- Artwork: Mark Raneses, Jeff Busch
- Mechanics: Joe Balcer, John Borg, Rob Hurtado
- Music: Brian L. Schmidt
- Sound: Brian L. Schmidt

Apollo 13 is a 1995 pinball machine based on the film Apollo 13. It was designed by Joe Kaminkow and Joe Balcer, and released by Sega Pinball in October 1995. It is notable for its 13-ball multiball mode, the most of any pinball machine.

== Gameplay ==
After starting a game, you have a choice of "Regular" or "Novice" mode. "Regular" is the normal 3-ball arrangement. "Novice" is timed play; the player has 2 minutes when any drained balls are autoplunged, and after the 2 minutes expires, the game is over when the ball(s) on the field drains.

You can start a game in "League" mode by holding the left flipper button in while starting a game, and "Wizard" mode by holding the right flipper button in.

There are 9 Missions; after doing all of them, Master Alarm is lit at the right saucer. The Missions are:

- Orbiter
- CO_{2}
- Manual Burn
- Rocket 2-Ball
- Moon's Gravity
- Under Volt
- Life Support
- Docking
- Lite Extra Ball

Once the 9 missions have finished, the wizard mode Master Alarm will start. It's a 40-second frenzy where every target scores 1 million and adds 1 million to a Jackpot that is lit at the Blastoff ramp. The Jackpot does not reset after collecting it, and does not have a limit. This round can be worth many points if the player has mastered the ramp shot.

=== Multiball modes ===
Apollo 13 has a number of pinball modes:

- Regular Multiball (5-balls)
- 13-ball (13 balls): When the 8 BLASTOFF letters (shown below the score display) are completed (they then flash), the next multiball will be 13 BALL.

When 13-ball starts, the bottom post raises and stays up for about 10 seconds. Five balls are launched, and after about 5 seconds the 8 balls in the 8-ball holder are released, all at once. There is no ball saver. During 13-ball, the Rocket is lit for Jackpots. After a Jackpot, the bottom post is not raised, increasing the difficulty of play.

After 5 Jackpots have been collected, the Super 13-Ball Jackpot is lit.

Gary Stern and the design team of this game posed for the cover story of the November 1995 edition of Play Meter, shown with the machine and 13 large pinballs.

== See also ==
- List of Sega Pinball machines
