= Robert Gagno =

Canadian pinball player

- Born: 1988 (age 36–37); Vancouver, British Columbia
- Occupation: Pinball player
- Years active: 2008-present
- Notable work: Winner of World Pinball Championship in 2016

Robert Gagno (born September 9, 1988) is a Canadian pinball player. Diagnosed with autism at the age of three, he won the world pinball championship at the age of 27.

== Early life ==
Gagno was born in Vancouver, British Columbia in 1988. His mother, Kathy, was once a top female player in Canada. He was diagnosed with autism when he was three.

== Career ==
Gagno began showing interest in pinball at the age of five. When he was ten, he started playing on a pinball machine, Whirlwind. At the age of 19, he contested his first tournament in Toronto. In 2011, his father, Maurizio, took him to Pittsburgh to participate in the world's largest pinball competition where he succeeded to stand among the four finalists. Later, he made it into the top ten in the IFPA's ranking and after winning the U.S. National Pinball Championship in 2015, he moved into the top five. He made an entry in the Professional and Amateur Pinball Association (PAPA) World Pinball Championship in Pennsylvania in 2016 and won the trophy.

== Personal life ==
Apart from pinball, Gagno works in a bank office and takes a computer programming class in the evening. In 2016, two film directors Nathan Drillot and Jeff Petry featured him in their documentary, Wizard Mode, which was premiered at Toronto’s Hot Docs Festival.
