= C-Smash VRS =

2023 VR sports game

- Developers: Wolf & Wood Interactive
- Publisher: RapidEyeMovers
- Composer: Ken Ishii Danalogue UNKLE
- Platforms: PlayStation VR2, PlayStation 5, Meta Quest
- Release: PlayStation VR2: JP: June 22, 2023; EU: June 22, 2023; US: June 23, 2023; Meta Quest: US: April 4, 2024; New Dimension (PS5): US: September 26, 2024
- Genre: Sports (Squash)
- Modes: Single player, Multiplayer

C-Smash VRS is a 2023 virtual reality sports game developed by Wolf & Wood Interactive and published by RapidEyeMovers. It is a reimagining of Sega's 2001 arcade and Dreamcast game Cosmic Smash, fusing elements of squash and Breakout in a low-gravity, futuristic setting. Initially released as an exclusive for PlayStation VR2, it expanded to standalone VR headsets and a non-VR third-person version, C-Smash VRS: New Dimension, for PlayStation 5.

== Gameplay ==
C-Smash VRS is played from a first-person perspective in VR modes, with a third-person view in New Dimension. Players control a low-poly avatar in zero-gravity arenas resembling space stations. The core mechanic involves serving and striking a ball with a virtual racket to shatter target blocks on the far wall, similar to squash or racquetball crossed with block-breaking puzzles. Blocks vary in durability, indicated by illuminated circles, and some grant power-ups like multi-ball or portals.

Movement is restricted to left-right strafing via analog sticks or teleportation, with optional full-body. Players pull the ball toward themselves with one hand to set up shots and swing the racket with the other for standard hits, charged "Power Smashes," or trick shots that alter trajectories. Walls are playable surfaces, allowing bounces for angled attacks.

Accessibility options include seated/standing play, one- or two-handed modes, adjustable racket angles, and dominant-hand switching.

=== Modes ===
Journey: A single-player campaign orbiting a planet, with branching paths to stages of increasing difficulty. Time limits add urgency, with bonuses for quick clears.

VRS Modes: Competitive multiplayer variants including Head-to-Head (versus), Firewall (defensive blocks), Quickshot (timed challenges), and Infinity (endless survival, solo or co-op).

Zen and Training: Relaxed practice modes for honing shots.

Boss Rush: AI opponents in bonus stages unlocked by trick-shot milestones.

Time Attack: Added in a 2024 update, focusing on speed with new audio tracks.

Online features support cross-platform play, leaderboards, player stats, and hybrid multiplayer between VR and non-VR users.

== Development ==
C-Smash VRS originated from publisher Jörg Tittel's obsession with Cosmic Smash, a niche Sega title he discovered in 2001. Despite initial resistance from Sega—where "half" of contacts were unfamiliar with the game—development started on the game in 2019. He partnered with UK-based VR studio Wolf & Wood, known for narrative titles like The Last Worker and The Exorcist: Legion VR, to adapt the 2D arcade concept into VR.

Audio tracks were contributed by Japanese DJ Ken Ishii (of Rez Infinite fame), synth producer Danalogue (frontman of The Comet Is Coming and Soccer 96), and electronic group UNKLE.

A demo launched on March 23, 2023, for PlayStation VR2, featuring solo training and online play. Post-launch, updates addressed matchmaking issues, added co-op, Infinity mode, and a music player. A limited physical edition by Limited Run Games was announced in 2024.

=== C-Smash VRS New Dimension ===
An updated non-VR version released on September 26, 2024 for PlayStation 5 called New Dimension introduced third-person controls, new animations, and hybrid cross-play, serving as a free upgrade for owners of the PSVR2 version.

== Reception ==
Reception

Aggregate scores
| Aggregator | Score |
|---|---|
| Metacritic | PS5: 70/100 (Note: Based on 18 reviews, 61% (11 reviews) of which is classified as "positive", 33% (6 reviews) as "mixed" and 6% (1 review) as "negative)) |
| OpenCritic | 72% |

Review scores
| Publication | Score |
|---|---|
| Edge | 6/10 |
| Video Games Chronicle | 4/5 |

C-Smash VRS received "mixed or average" reviews for its June 2023 PSVR2 release, according to review aggregator website Metacritic. While oulets such as VideoGamesChronicle praised its gameplay, others such as TheGamer critiqued its overly precise controls.
