= Star Trek (1991 pinball) =

1991 pinball machine

- front of flyer
- Manufacturer: Data East
- Release date: October 1991
- System: DataEast/Sega Version 3
- Design: Joe Kaminkow, Ed Cebula
- Programming: Kristina Donofrio
- Artwork: Margaret Hudson, Kevin O'Connor
- Music: Brian Schmidt
- Sound: Brian Schmidt
- Production run: 4,400

Star Trek is a pinball machine designed by Joe Kaminkow and Ed Cebula and released by Data East in 1991. The manual for the game calls it the Star Trek 25th Anniversary Pinball. It is the second Star Trek pinball machine, following the 1979 Bally table, and preceding Williams Star Trek: The Next Generation and 2013 Stern Star Trek (based on the 2009 and 2013 J. J. Abrams films).

== Design ==
The game was released to roughly coincide with the release of Star Trek VI: The Undiscovered Country, and the 25th anniversary of Star Trek.

It uses the same half-height dot matrix display introduced on Checkpoint.

The game includes sounds for the transporter, red alert, and communicator chirp; it also incorporates the theme music, and includes speech by Scotty (James Doohan). The voice lines by James Doohan were recorded by Brian Schmidt in Los Angeles; after completing the script they worked together to write additional lines that James Doohan then recorded. As payment, James Doohan received one of the completed machines. Voice actor Fred Young recorded lines for Captain Kirk, but when a license couldn't be agreed with William Shatner these were unused.

The transporter on the backglass shows Chekov, Kirk, Sulu, Uhura, Spock, and Dr. McCoy who transport away when the multiball is played. Kevin O'Connor who created the artwork for the 1979 machine was also the artist for the backglass and cabinet of this machine. He was restricted on the backglass by the transporter effect in the middle. He created likenesses of the main cast, with William Shatner and Leonard Nimoy featuring prominently. The sides of the cabinet show the Enterprise, with Klingon and Romulan ships approaching. Both the backglass and cabinet had earlier versions of concept art.

At the direction of Joe Kaminkow, several episodes from the series are referenced in the artwork. In total references are made to 26 episodes, including the Guardian of Forever ("The City on the Edge of Forever") and "The Doomsday Machine" which are prominently labelled.

The playfield includes a hard coating for protection, called "Cryptonite".

== Layout ==
Centered at the top of the playfield are three rollover lanes, with three bumpers just below them. Just below these is the dilithium crystal panel with nine numbered lights and a swinging target called the primary crystal. To either side of this panel are ramps which loop back to converge, and use a diverter to direct the ball to an inlane. On each side of the machine is a bank of four drop-targets, spelling S-T-A-R on the left, and T-R-E-K on the right; just above these are sinkholes, crystal on the left, and scanner on the right. A lane to the right of the right ramp leads back to the top rollover lanes.

== Gameplay ==
The objective of the game is to collect dilithium crystals to "energize the transporter". The game is started with the photon torpedo button on the front of the machine, with the player timing it to try and hit either a Klingon, Romulan, or Tholian ship. The player tries to hit various targets around the playfield to collect the nine dilithium crystals shown on the panel, followed by hitting the primary crystal to power the transporter, and a final shot to activate it and start the three-ball multiball. During multiball a series of jackpots can be scored, culminating with a 100 million "super duper jackpot".

Other modes that can be played include a video mode shooting ships, "tribble trouble" which includes animation of tribbles, and a mode started by repeatedly shooting the ramps to charge the phasers where unlimited millions can be scored.

== Reception ==
Play Meter found it to be one of Data East's strongest games to date, praising its sound, display, and art. The voice of Scotty, recorded for this game, was also praised with the audio and voices creating a "realistic, suspenseful atmosphere". The backglass was called the best Data East had ever done, with the characters in the transporter beaming up and down. The central feature on the playfield, a ramp with diverter, was found to be steep making it a more difficult game.

== Custom version ==
Data East produced a single unit of a custom version of this machine; it was commissioned as a Christmas present by Richard Donner for Joel Silver. Called Joel Silver, the game is based on Star Trek with dilithium crystals replaced by popcorn, and features sounds from Silver and his colleagues.
