= Lyman F. Sheats Jr. =

American pinball champion, software engineer and designer (1966–2022)

- Born: March 24, 1966; Colorado, U.S.
- Died: January 19, 2022 (aged 55); Hoffman Estates, Illinois, U.S.
- Other names: Lyman Sheats, LFS
- Occupation: Pinball software engineer
- Years active: 1993–2022
- Employer: Stern Pinball, Inc.
- Partner: Penni C. Epstein

Lyman F. Sheats Jr. (March 24, 1966 – January 19, 2022) was an American pinball champion, game designer and coin-operated game operating system software engineer who worked for Bally, Williams, and Stern Pinball, among other companies.

== Biography ==
Lyman Sheats first began playing pinball in 1986 while studying computer science at Northeastern University. He bought his first pinball machine, The Addams Family, in 1992. While studying, he worked for the Mitre Corporation in Massachusetts, later moving to Virginia to work for them full time.

Sheats came to prominence in the world of pinball as a player in 1993, when he claimed the overall championship at PAPA 3, the tournament presented by the Professional and Amateur Pinball Association (after finishing fourth the year prior). He would also win the championship in 2004 (PAPA 7) and 2006 (PAPA 9). Lyman also won the European Pinball Championship in 2007. He was an active player in several Chicago area pinball leagues and won numerous local championships. Lyman was considered to be one of the greatest pinball players of all time and was noted throughout his career for his unusual playing stance.

Sheats began his career in 1993 at Data East where he worked on the game and dot matrix display programming for The Last Action Hero (1993), The Who's Tommy Pinball Wizard (1994), Royal Rumble (WWF) (1994), Guns N' Roses (1994), and Maverick (1994). In 1995, following Sega pinball's acquisition of Data East Pinball, he was recruited by Williams/Bally (now WMS Industries) to program their pinball machines.

Sheats's first game for Bally/Midway was Attack From Mars which he programmed with designer Brian Eddy. He joined the team mid-development and re-wrote the code to understand it better. Sheats and Eddy again teamed up on Medieval Madness produced by Williams in 1997.

Sheats worked with designer George Gomez to program Monster Bash, which was produced by Williams in 1998. Monster Bash has a "Lyman's Lament" Easter Egg, accessed through a series of right and left flipper sequences.

He was involved in Williams's Pinball 2000 project through October 1999 when Williams closed its pinball division to concentrate on other gaming machines such as slot machines and video games. After a few years of programming video games at Midway Games, Sheats rejoined the pinball arena when Gary Stern hired him in 2003 at the newly renamed Stern Pinball. Shortly after being hired by Stern, Sheats teamed up with fellow ex-Williams employee Steve Ritchie to work on a series of blockbuster games such as Spider-Man (2007) and AC/DC (2012, 2018). Sheats also reunited with George Gomez to create the Batman: The Dark Knight game produced by Stern Pinball in 2008.

In later years, Sheats worked with the team that updated the rule sets for The Walking Dead (2014) and Batman '66 (2016) games that were produced by Stern Pinball.

In 2021, Sheats, along with Josh Sharpe, partnered with Chicago Gaming Company to develop new software for the remake of Cactus Canyon. Some of Sheats' code was completed posthumously and a release was announced in 2025.

== Personal life ==
Sheats was a coffee enthusiast and roasted his own blend of beans at home.

== Death ==
Lyman F. Sheats Jr. died in Hoffman Estates, Illinois, the evening of January 19, 2022, at 55. The official cause of death is listed as suicide.
