= GameSoundCon =

Video game sound conference

- Status: Active
- Genre: Video game development
- Venue: Varies
- Locations: Los Angeles, CA
- Country: Varies
- Inaugurated: 2009
- Most recent: 2024
- Attendance: 1000+
- Organizer: SoundCon, LLC
- Website: www.gamesoundcon.com

GameSoundCon is a conference and seminar on video game music and video game sound design. GameSoundCon began as a multi-city conference providing seminars occurring 2-4 times per year in various cities in the US on creating music and sound effects for videogames. Speakers and panelists from throughout the industry cover topics ranging from composing game music to game sound design and the business of game sound.

== Background ==
The first GameSoundCon was held in Los Angeles at the Hyatt Regency Century City Century Place in September 2009, primarily designed for composers, sound designers and audio engineers with little or no experience in games, but experience in traditional media such as music/TV/film.

In the 2009 GameSoundCon conferences, two parallel content tracks were given. In the first track, called "Main Game Audio Sessions," tutorials and panel sessions included: Composing Game Music, Game Audio Tech 1& 2, Game Sound Design as well as roundtables on business issues, casual game music and licensing. In the second track, staff from MTV's Harmonix Music Systems gave tutorials on how to create content for the ill-fated Rock Band Network.

In 2011, hands-on training sessions in FMOD were added, taught by Stephan Schutze. In 2013,Wwise sessions were added as well.

In 2013, GameSoundCon went to a once-per-year format, settling in Los Angeles. At the same time, GameSoundCon expanded its format, adding a second series of session tracks for higher-end talks for those with significant experience in games

In 2016, it expanded again, adding additional session tracks for Virtual Reality audio and game audio research

== Industry Survey ==
Each year, GameSoundCon publishes the GameSoundCon Industry Survey which covers topics such as compensation for game composers, sound designers and other game audio roles; work and environment; contract terms, rights, bonuses, royalties; use of live musicians and middleware; and education level.

In 2016 The GameSoundCon Industry Survey did a deeper analysis on gender-based differences in salaries for game composers and sound designers . The study suggested a "gender pay gap" equivalent of approximately 2 years of experience.

A similar GameSoundCon study showed a large increase in the demand for composers and audio directors virtually coincident with the opening of the Apple "app store" and the release of Facebook's developer program

== G.A.N.G. Scholars Program ==
GameSoundCon, through its partnership with the Game Audio Network Guild, provides complimentary passes to its conference through the G.A.N.G. Scholars Program. Student applications require the applicant to submit essays, recommendations from professors and GPA

== Keynote Speakers ==
- GameSoundCon (Los Angeles, California) - September, 2016 (2 days); Keynote Speaker: Gordy Haab, Independent Composer
- GameSoundCon (Los Angeles, California) - November, 2015 (2 days); Keynote Speaker: Chance Thomas, Independent Composer
- GameSoundCon (Los Angeles, California) - October, 2014 (2 days); Keynote Speaker: Marty ODonnell, Independent Composer
- GameSoundCon (Los Angeles, California) - November, 2013 (2 days); Keynote Speaker: Austin Wintory, Independent Composer
- GameSoundCon (San Francisco, California) - October, 2012 (2 days); Keynote Speaker: Clint Bajakian, Sony Computer Entertainment
- GameSoundCon (San Francisco, California) - November, 2011 (2 days); Keynote Speaker: Guy Whitmore, Popcap
- GameSoundCon (Los Angeles, California) - June 6, 2011 (1 day)
- GameSoundCon (New York, New York) - October 2010 (2 days)
- GameSoundCon (Seattle, Washington) - May 11, 2010 (1 day)
- GameSoundCon (San Francisco, California) - November 2010 (2 days)
- GameSoundCon 2009 (Los Angeles, California) - September 23/24 (2 days); Keynote Speaker: Marty O'Donnell, Audio Director, Bungie
- GameSoundCon 2009 (San Francisco, California) - November 13/14 (2 days); Keynote Speaker: Chance Thomas, HUGESound
