= Robo-Squash =

1990 video game

- Developer: NuFX
- Publishers: NA/EU: Atari Corporation; JP: Mumin Corporation
- Producer: Craig Erickson
- Programmer: Ed Schneider
- Artist: Robert Nagel
- Composer: David Tumminaro
- Platform: Atari Lynx
- Release: NA: 1990; EU: 1990; JP: July 26, 1991
- Genres: Action, sports
- Modes: Single-player, multiplayer

Robo-Squash is an action-sports game for the Atari Lynx, published by Atari Corporation in 1990.

== Gameplay ==
Gameplay screenshot

Robo-Squash is an action-sports game.

== Plot ==
The year is 2810 and the president has died leaving "the United World Federation in Chaos." In order solve the dispute you have been sent to compete for control of the planets and the domination of the galaxy in a friendly game of Robo-Squash.

== Reception ==
Reception

Review scores
Publication	Score
AllGame	3.5/5
Computer and Video Games	70%
Electronic Gaming Monthly	5/10, 4/10, 4/10, 5/10
IGN	7.0/10
ST Action	70%
Aktueller Software Markt	8/12
Consoles +	78%
Génération 4	8/10
Joystick	77%
Micromanía	8/10
Player One	89%
Power Play	46%
Raze	82%
ST Format	81%
Tilt	14/20

Robo-Squash was met with mostly positive reception. Computer and Video Games reviewed the game in their March 1991 issue giving it a score of 70 out of 100. Julian Boardman reviewed the game for Raze in their April 1991 issue. In his short notes he wrote that the game was "addictive" with "engrossing gameplay", giving a score of 82%. In 1999, Robert A. Jung reviewed the game for IGN and gave it a 7 out of 10, calling it "a good, slightly above-average game. Playing it by yourself is fine, since the difficulty levels let you tune the computer to your skills. I suspect, though, that playing it with another person would be more fun. Best for players who are looking for a sports-type game for the Lynx."
