= Jurassic Park (pinball) =

Series of pinball machines

There have been five pinball adaptations of the Jurassic Park franchise beginning with a physical table released by Data East pinball in 1993, the same month the original film released. Sega's 1997 release The Lost World: Jurassic Park is based on the second movie of the series. A virtual table developed by Zen Studios for the franchise's 25th anniversary in 2018 released as DLC for the video game Pinball FX3. Another physical table was released by Stern Pinball in 2019, with a further version released by Stern Pinball in 2021. All five tables have different designs.

== Original Data East version ==
Jurassic Park
- Manufacturer: Data East
- Release date: June 1993
- System: Data East Version 3
- Design: Ed Cebula; Neil Falconer; Joe Kaminkow
- Programming: Neil Falconer
- Artwork: Markus Rothkranz
- Music: Brian Schmidt
- Sound: Brian Schmidt
- Production run: 9008

=== Design ===
The table was initially planned to be based on Cadillacs and Dinosaurs as a favor to Bernie Stolar, then Executive Vice-President of Sony. Data East were pleased when they lost this license to Williams, and replaced it with Jurassic Park.

The most prominent feature of the table is the animated T-Rex head which can pick up and swallow the ball, which was protected by a patent. After observing it at the Rock and Roll McDonald’s test location Williams complained to Data East that the T-Rex following the ball around the table violated a patent used on FunHouse, and Data East issued a software update to change this feature.

The side of the cabinet has Jurassic Park and a stylized dinosaur taken from the film poster.

The handle of the launcher is shaped like a Tazer stun gun. The game includes the voice of Richard Attenborough. Animations include the T-Rex eating a goat (unless disabled by turning "family mode" on), and Velociraptors.

=== Gameplay ===
There are 11 gameplay modes, called "Computer Screens". They are started by shooting the right scoop, called "Control Room", when it is lit. These modes are stackable (i.e., one mode can be running while another mode is in progress). The Control Room is briefly lit by the right ramp or either inlane, and is permanently lit by shooting the Power Shed (the right scoop) on the upper-right side of the playfield.

- Stampede
- Escape Isla Nublar
- Raptor Two-Ball: Lights the Boat Dock (saucer at the right loop) for Raptor Two-Ball multiball. Shooting the Raptor Pit collects the ball and gives 2 more.
- Electric Fence: You have to hit the pop bumpers a certain number of times to get Timmy off the electric fence, before he gets electrocuted.
- Spitter Attack
- System Boot: Shoot the Bunker, the Control Room, and the Power Shed scoops to collect a maximum of 30 million points.
- Raptors' Rampage
- Mosquito Millions
- Feed T-Rex: Shoot the T-Rex saucer to feed the "goat" (ball) to the T-Rex for 30 million points.
- Bone Busting
- Light Extra Ball: Extra Ball is lit at the Boat Docks.

Completing all Computer Screen modes lights the Control Room for "System Failure", a six-ball wizard mode where all shots on the playfield are worth one million points. It lasts for 45 seconds.

=== Reception ===
In a review for The Flipside the sound quality was appreciated, and while scoring in some modes was found to be unbalanced this was a minor issue as they were all found fun to play and could still be skipped by starting multiball or system failure. It was found to possibly be Data East's best pinball game to date.

== The Lost World ==
The Lost World: Jurassic Park was released by Sega Pinball in June 1997, based on the motion picture The Lost World. It includes custom speech by Jeff Goldblum.

== Zen Studios ==
The second pinball adaptation of Jurassic Park is a virtual table developed by Zen Studios as one of three tables in the Jurassic Park pinball pack, designed to celebrate the franchise's 25th anniversary, which is an add-on for Pinball FX 3 that was released on February 20, 2018.

In addition to developing a digital pinball adaptation of the film, Zen Studios also developed another pinball table that reflects on its aftermath, titled Jurassic Park: Pinball Mayhem, which is also one of the three tables in the aforementioned Jurassic Park pinball pack, with a table based on Jurassic World completing the pack.

All three of these tables were remastered for Pinball FX, with full release on February 16, 2023.

An update on 20th February, 2024 added the John Williams "theme from Jurassic Park" to Jurassic Park and Jurassic Park: Pinball Mayhem on both Pinball FX and Pinball FX3.

== Stern Pinball release ==
Jurassic Park
- Manufacturer: Stern Pinball
- Release date: September 2019
- Design: Keith Elwin
- Programming: Rick Naegele
- Artwork: Jonathan Bergeron (Johnny Crap)
- Music: Jerry Thompson; John Williams
- Sound: Jerry Thompson

Stern Pinball released a third pinball adaptation of the film in 2019.

Upon launch, Stern created three versions: Pro, Premium and Limited Edition. All models feature a unique spinning kinetic newton ball Jungle Explorer Vehicle, three flippers, four ramps and a custom T-Rex sculpt. Premium and Limited Edition models feature a motorized animatronic ball-eating, ball-throwing, T-Rex mechanism and an interactive Raptor Pen ball lock mechanism. The game features the John Williams Jurassic Park score.

The Limited Edition model is limited to 500 units and features a numbered plaque, custom-themed backglass, cabinet artwork and art blades as well as a shaker motor and anti-reflection glass.

Wayne Knight's voice featured in the original motion picture is sampled in the game.

In August 2023, Stern announced a new limited-edition version of the game called Jurassic Park 30th anniversary. This version was limited to 500 units featuring a brand-new exterior art package, full-color mirrored backglass, “Illusion Copper” powder-coated pinball armor, a custom designer-autographed bottom arch, inside art blades, upgraded audio system, anti-reflection pinball playfield glass, shaker motor, a sequentially numbered plaque, and a Certificate of Authenticity. Stern also updated the software for all previous versions adding multiple features including Co-Op Play mode, Team Play mode as well as new refinements and voices.

=== Game overview and objectives ===
Dennis Nedry's computer virus continues to send Jurassic Park into chaos. The dinosaurs are loose on the island and the employees are in danger. The player has to rescue the staff and capture the dinosaurs and eventually stage an escape.

- Shoot lit white arrows to spell MAP, then the left ramp to enter a Paddock. In any Paddock, shoot the flashing red “rescue” shots until the yellow “trap” targets light. Hit as many as required, then capture the dinosaur by hitting the yellow / green flashing shot.
- Completing certain tasks lights the left target for Control Room. Three modes are available and can be chosen using the flippers and action button.
- Hitting the truck three times starts a T-Rex hurry-up that leads into a Multiball. Every four times after that, it will light one of three modes at the left ramp.
- Spelling C-H-A-O-S in order, then hitting the target between the bumpers starts Chaos Multiball.
- Locking a ball in the center of the raptor pit, then hitting the raptor pit enough times starts Raptor Tri-Ball.
- Shooting the right ramp enough times starts Pteranodon Attack. Build up a switch value, then shoot the right ramp to collect it.
- If “Smart Missile” is lit at the left return lane from enough “rescue” shots, use the action button to select which reward you want, then shoot the target between the bumpers.
- Hit the three purple standups, then the large standup near the side ramp for helpful supply drops and 2x scoring. Make upper loop shots to light the large standup for even better rewards.

==== Skill shots and multiball ====
There are various skill shots and multiballs throughout the game. The skill shot on Jurassic Park is a combo sequence: following a full plunge, the left ramp must first be shot, then the right ramp, then the side ramp, then the right orbit. Each shot in the sequence awards 2x, 4x and 6x the base value. There are also secret skill shots and the MXV skill shot.

There are three different multiballs: CHAOS multiball, Raptor Tri-Ball and King of the Island multiball.

==== Mini wizard modes ====
Three mini-wizard modes exist - one for making it to the end of the map, one for playing all Control Room modes, and one for playing all T. Rex modes. Playing all three of these modes is a requirement to unlock Escape Nublar.

- Visitor Center (Raptors in the Kitchen) Wizard Mode: Navigate the truck to the Visitor Center to begin.
- Secure Control Room Wizard Mode: Starts upon completion of the control room modes.
- Museum Mayhem Wizard Mode: Starts upon completion of the T-Rex events.

==== Escape Nublar wizard mode ====
Upon completion of all three mini-wizard modes, Escape Nublar Wizard begins. The goal of Escape Nublar is to navigate back through the paddocks to the main gate and helipad while rescuing any remaining staff and dinosaurs before the volcano erupts. This is a single-ball wizard mode where you have three “balls” (trucks) to complete the mode. Each Paddock consists of two phases: Rescue Phase and Navigate Phase.

==== When Dinosaurs Ruled the Earth wizard mode ====
A super wizard mode, available at the left ramp after completing "Escape Nublar". It's a timed 6-ball multiball.

=== Stern accessories ===
Stern offered accessories for Jurassic Park as well:

- Jurassic Park topper: This topper interacts with your game by capturing dinosaurs to light a letter in Jurassic Park. Your letter progress carries over from game to game. Spell Jurassic Park for a special mode (Goat Mania).
- Jurassic Park inside art blades
- Jurassic Park side armor
- Jurassic Park shooter knob: The shooter knob is crowned with an egg-shaped amber globe, housing a suspended fossilized mosquito.

== Reception ==
A review of the Stern Pinball version in 2023 noted its popularity with players.

== Home Edition ==
A home edition designed by Jack Danger (deadflip) was released by Stern Pinball in 2021.

== See also ==
- List of Stern Pinball machines
