= Star Wars Trilogy (pinball) =

1997 pinball machine

- North American pinball flyer
- Manufacturer: Sega Pinball
- Release date: March 1997
- System: Sega WhiteStar
- Design: Joe Kaminkow, Joe Balcer
- Programming: Lonnie D. Ropp, Orin Day
- Artwork: Morgan Weistling
- Music: Brian Schmidt
- Sound: Brian Schmidt
- Production run: 2,250

Star Wars Trilogy is a 1997 pinball machine released by Sega Pinball in March 1997. It is based in the Star Wars original trilogy. It was released in the year of the release of the special editions of the films. The backbox features an optional lenticular lens 3D image, a pinball industry first.

== Design ==
To differentiate the game from earlier Star Wars pinball machines a choice was made not to include the Death Star as a prominent feature. The models for the TIE fighter and X-wing were bought from the commercial release of Galoob's micro-machines.

== Gameplay ==
There are six modes called heroics. The top hole starts a mode and feeds the ball to the left inlane via the cannon. The modes are:

- Leia: Choke Jabba the Hutt. The display shows Leia with a chain around Jabba's neck that Leia pulls tighter with every ramp shot. 3 ramps chokes Jabba. The ramps score 200k then 300k and finally 400k. The mode lasts about 30 seconds.
- Luke: Load the X-Wing and shoot the ball through the narrow lane within 30 seconds for a 500k jackpot.
- Chewie: Rebuild C-3PO. The ramp, both orbits and the top hole score points and award a body part. The points awarded are 100k, 200k, 300k and finally 400k.
- C-3PO/R2-D2: Shoot the top hole 3 times to stop the trash compactor. Each shot scores 50k+ 100k.
- Obi Wan: Shoot the lit shots to confuse the stormtroopers. The first shot is the right orbit, then the ramp, then the left orbit. Each shot scores 150k+ 100k per shot.
- Han Solo: A hurry-up. Shoot the right hole to escape from the slug. The value starts at 420k.

At the start of the game the player is given the choice of playing either the normal 3 ball game or a novice game that guarantees a 2-minute game time with the ball saver active. When the ball saver times out, the first drain ends the game. Holding in the left flipper and pressing start gives League mode and holding the right flipper gives Wizard mode.
