= Batman Forever (pinball) =

1995 pinball machine

- Manufacturer: Sega Pinball
- Release date: June 1995
- System: Sega Version 3B
- Design: Paul Lesley, Joe Kaminkow
- Programming: Brian Rudolph (dot matrix: John Carpenter)
- Artwork: Morgan Weistling, Marc Raneses, Jeff Busch (dot matrix: Jack Liddon, Kurt Andersen, Marc Reneses)
- Music: Brian L. Schmidt
- Sound: Brian L. Schmidt
- Production run: 2,500

Batman Forever is a pinball machine released in June 1995 by Sega Pinball. It is based on the motion picture of the same name.

== Features ==
The game uses the 192x64 "supersize" dot matrix display with a Motorola 68000-based 16-bit controller. It features several electric-green wireform ramps with the "Batcave" escape ramp extending down behind the flippers and over the playfield apron, releasing balls up the playfield during multi ball. The "Batwing" cannon rotates & aims across the playfield and fires the ball with a pistol grip on front of the machine. Speech clips from the film are used. Additionally, the game had a video mode in which the Batmobile is guided over rooftops, dodging obstacles to earn bonus points.

The backglass shows Val Kilmer as Batman, with other cast members in character.

== Layout ==
The game includes four ramps.
