= Star Trek (1979 pinball) =

1979 pinball machine

- Manufacturer: Bally
- Release date: April 1979
- System: Bally MPU AS-2518-35
- Design: Gary Gayton
- Artwork: Kevin O'Connor
- Production run: 16,842

Star Trek is a 1979 pinball game developed by Bally and licensed from Paramount Pictures Corporation. It was the first pinball machine based on the franchise of the same name. A second pinball machine of the same name was released in 1991 by Data East. A third pinball machine of the same name was released by Stern Pinball in 2013. There was also a 1971 Gottlieb pinball machine called Star Trek, but with no connection to or licensing for the television series.

Production of the game was announced in a press release on April 15, 1979.

== Design and licensing ==
Bally released Eight Ball in 1977. Paramount Television thought it used the unlicensed likeness of Henry Winkler as "Fonzie" in Happy Days. As settlement Bally agreed to license Star Trek. Bally's VP of marketing, Tom Nieman was not a big fan of sci-fi and underappreciated the potential scope of success.

Early versions of the backglass showed the crew of the Enterprise dressed in the uniforms from the original Star Trek television series. This was changed during development before the machine went into production to show them dressed in single-color clothing to fit with the film Star Trek: The Motion Picture that was to be released at the same time as the game. Approval for the character likenesses had already been approved so these remained unchanged between the two versions. Gesso was used by Kevin O'Connor to cover the areas with the older uniforms. The production version of the backglass features Kirk, Spock, McCoy, and Uhura, the Enterprise, and four Klingon D7-class ships. There is some inconsistency in design on the finished game, for example using a font based on Star Trek instead of Star Trek: The Motion Picture. All of the characters on the backglass are armed.

The Enterprise also features prominently in the artwork of the rest the game; it is on the middle of the playfield, both sides of the backbox, and both sides of the cabinet. On the sides of the cabinet it is shown using stencil art firing on a Klingon D7-class ship above a planet.

== Layout and gameplay ==
The table is controlled with two flippers, and includes three pop bumpers, one kick-out hole, a bank of four drop targets, and three round stand-up targets. Part of the game is to spell B-A-L-L-Y by hitting various targets. The initials of the designer, G.G., are hidden in the artwork near the kick-out hole.

This is one of the earliest games to include an attract mode, where the five insert letters of B-A-L-L-Y and the row of four lights above them move from left to right in a 20-step sequence.

== Star Ship ==
Star Ship was designed by a different designer at Bally and included an image resembling the Enterprise on the backglass. This designer, Greg Kmiec, had just designed two of the earliest Bally licensed games, Wizard, and Capt. Fantastic both inspired by Tommy. When the Star Trek license went to Gary Gayton's design, Star Ship never went into production and was rethemed as Supersonic, with artwork based on Concorde.

== Reception ==
Roger Sharpe reviewed the machine in Play Meter, rating it at 3.5/4 praising the artwork and noting that its a tough game to beat.

Starlog briefly covered the game in their July 1979 issue, and in the following Star Trek special issue ran a competition to design a backglass and win a Bally Star Trek pinball machine.

Pinball Player found it to be a colourful and good game, praising a shot which could send the ball back to the plunger to collect a bonus score.

The game was the second highest selling post-war Bally pinball machine up to 1979.

== Legacy ==
Three further pinball tables were released based on Star Trek licenses, including Star Trek: The Next Generation in 1993.

The table was used in Rammstein's "Amerika" 2004 music video with the band playing it on the "moon".
