= Jorian Engelbrektsson =

Swedish pinball player

Jorian Engelbrektsson (born May 15, 1982, Falun, Sweden) became the first non-American to take the Pinball World Champion title, which he did on October 14, 2007 at the PAPA 10 contest (The 10th World Championship organized by the Professional & Amateur Pinball Association) in Scott Township, Pennsylvania.

Less than a month later, on November 11, 2007 he also won the Swedish pinball championship.

As of 2025 he is still playing in European pinball tournaments.
