= Lethal Weapon 3 (pinball) =

1992 pinball machine

- Manufacturer: Data East Pinball
- Release date: August 1992
- System: DataEast/Sega (Version 3)
- Design: Joe Kaminkow, Ed Cebula
- Programming: Kristina Donofrio
- Artwork: Markus Rothkranz
- Mechanics: John Lund
- Music: Brian L. Schmidt
- Sound: Brian L. Schmidt
- Production run: 10,350

Lethal Weapon 3 is a pinball machine produced by Data East Pinball in 1992. It is based on the movie of the same name, which was the most popular film in summer 1992. By 1994, it was Data East's all-time most successful pinball machine. The game was designed by Markus Rothkranz.

== Development ==
Richard Donner, who directed the film series, had a past relationship with Data East. In 1991, he had the company produce a custom Joel Silver pinball machine that he gifted to the film producer. Danny Glover, Mel Gibson, and Joe Pesci all recorded custom voice call-outs for the game.

The game featured a Generation 3 FullView dot matrix display, which was larger than the current industry standard, and displayed digitized movie clips. The game also featured a hidden leveling system, in which players "grab hold of the Data East gun handle and eliminate bad guys in one of three video crime simulator shoot outs".

The game was designed to appeal to both novices and experienced players.

There is a choice of three background music tracks – a version of C+C Music Factory's "Gonna Make You Sweat (Everybody Dance Now)", ZZ Top's "Sharp Dressed Man", and an original composition by Brian Schmidt.

== Playfield and layout ==
The lower part of the playfield shows a large Uzi with insert lights.

== Gameplay ==
Unlike video modes in most other games, the Uzi video mode is played with the ball still on the main playfield. Repeated shots to the orbits light bullets in the ammunition magazine; once all six are lit, the player can pull the trigger on the cabinet's gun handle (also used to launch the ball) and shoot a criminal who appears on the display for extra points. Regardless of the outcome, the player receives one of six awards in a sequence shown on the playfield.

Shooting the three numbered saucers (1, 2, 3) in any order awards points and displays a clip featuring one of the stunts from the Lethal Weapon film series. The sequence is: High Fall, Car Crash, Toilet, Explosion, Helicopter, each awarding more points than the last. After the Helicopter award, the player can complete the three saucer shots one more time to earn a large bonus and see a "Super Stunt" montage of all the clips in rapid succession.

== Release and reception ==
Lethal Weapon 3 received positive reviews. The game was noted as part of a larger shift from original themes to movie-themed pinball machines. A reviewer for The Flipside found the theme to be well integrated, and the manufacturers best pinball machine to-date; only minor issues were found, such as the unreliability of the skill shot. By 1994, it was Data East's all-time most successful pinball machine.

Data East provided six Lethal Weapon 3 games for attendee's to play at the movie's Los Angeles premiere in May, 1992. However, the completed game was not available for release until several months later. Joe Pesci also owns a Lethal Weapon 3 pinball machine.

== Other versions ==
Data East was one of the few commercial pinball companies that manufactured custom pinball games. Two custom machines based on Lethal Weapon 3 were produced, Aaron Spelling and Michael Jordan; both designed by the same design team as for Lethal Weapon 3.

=== Michael Jordan ===
Seven machines were manufactured to raise money for charity, with the first two raising over $35,000 at an auction for the Michael Jordan Foundation. The programming for the sound and display chips was customized; different versions of the cabinet and backbox exist, including a unique machine with light blue cabinet, and another in a red cabinet.

=== Aaron Spelling ===
A single bespoke machine was manufactured, commissioned by Aaron Spelling's wife, Candy, as a present. The playfield and backglass show Aaron, Candy, and their two children. Voices were added, including Candy saying "I like pink champagne on ice", and their daughter Tori saying "I love you, daddy".
