= List of Sega Pinball machines =

Sega Pinball Inc. was a division of Sega from 1994 to September 1999. Sega first entered the pinball market in 1971, but stopped production in 1978. Sega re-entered the market when it took over Data East's pinball division in 1994. They produced machines under the name Sega Pinball Inc. for 5 years before leaving the market again in 1999. Sega sold all pinball assets to Gary Stern, president of the division, who then founded Stern Pinball, Inc. on October 1, 1999.

== Sega Pinball (1994–1999) ==
Sega Pinball Inc.
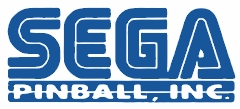
- Industry: Interactive entertainment, Pinball
- Predecessor: Data East Pinball
- Founded: 1994
- Defunct: 1999
- Fate: Sold to Gary Stern
- Successor: Stern Pinball
- Headquarters: Chicago
- Key people: Gary Stern; Joe Kaminkow
- Products: Pinball machines and some arcade/redemption games

=== Pinball ===
- Apollo 13 (1995)
- Batman Forever (1995)
- Baywatch (1995)
- Mary Shelley's Frankenstein (1995)
- GoldenEye (1996)
- Independence Day (1996)
- Space Jam (1996)
- Twister (1996)
- Star Wars Trilogy (1997)
- Starship Troopers (1997)
- The X-Files (1997)
- The Lost World: Jurassic Park (1997)
- Godzilla (1998)
- Golden Cue (1998)
- Lost in Space (1998)
- Viper Night Drivin' (1998)
- South Park (1999)
- Harley Davidson (1999)

==== Unreleased prototypes ====
- Derby Daze (1996)
- Roach Racers (1997)

=== Miscellaneous arcade machines ===
- Cut the Cheese (1996)
- Austin Powers (1997)
- Udderly Tickets (1997)
- Whack-A-Doodle-Doo (1998)
- Titanic (1999)

== Sega Enterprises Ltd. (1971–1978) ==
=== Pinball ===
- Ali Baba
- Arabian Night
- Bad Cat
- Big Kick
- Big Together
- Carnival
- Cha-Cha-Cha
- Crazy Clock
- Explorer
- Galaxy
- Mikoshi
- Millionaire
- Miss Nessie
- Monte Rosa
- Nostalgia
- Robin Hood
- Rodeo
- Sapporo
- Sky Lover
- Surfing
- Temptation
- Winner
- Woman-Lib

== See also ==
- Sega, S.A. SONIC
