= Glossary of pinball terms =

A glossary of terms, commonly used in discussing pinball machines.

== A ==
action button

A physical button located in the center of the lockdown bar. The action button can be used to activate the auto-plunger and complete in-game actions.

add-a-ball

(abbreviated AAB) a feature on some pinball machines that allows the player to earn additional balls by achieving a specific task. In modern machines, the add-a-ball feature often adds an additional ball into play during a multiball. Add-a-ball was first introduced in the 1960s to distinguish pinball machines from gambling devices by extending gameplay without allowing players to win additional credits. Unlike the extra ball feature, balls earned through add-a-ball on these machines are typically denoted on the game display by increasing the overall number of balls available. Additionally, a player can continue to earn additional balls via add-a-ball even if it has already been earned once from a ball in play or if the ball in play is itself an add-a-ball. Colloquially, machines that offer this feature are also called add-a-balls.

apron

A large attachment at the very bottom of the playfield, which covers the ball trough and often has inserts to display cards that explain the rules, scoring, or price. The front edges of the apron can form the lower edge of the playfield to lead the ball to the drain. This component is typically made of metal or plastic and can go by several names.

art blades

Decorative vinyl decals installed on the inner side walls of the cabinet just above the playfield that cover the plain black cabinet walls. Mirrored glass is occasionally used to cover the cabinet walls instead of vinyl stickers.

attract mode

Animations on the display, and/or changes to the light display on the playfield to entice passers-by to play the game. One of the earliest pinball machines to have an attract mode is Star Trek (1979).

auto-plunger

A mechanism that can launch balls into play without requiring the player to manually operate the plunger. Certain games such as Judge Dredd have two auto-plungers.

auto-plunger button

A button that is located where the plunger handle would be on some 1990s pinball games. It activates the auto-plunger and sometimes has extra functions like in the Terminator 2 game where it fires a cannon. Some games would have a themed auto-plunger button. Examples of this include Fish Tales where it is shaped like a fishing rod, Mary Shelley's Frankenstein where it is a switch instead of a button, and in Terminator 2, it resembles a gun trigger.

autosave

More commonly called ball save, every ball that goes down the drain will be returned to the plunger for a limited time. The amount of time that an autosave lasts varies from machine to machine and can be adjustable. Usually only available when starting with a new ball (to compensate for "unfair" very fast drains), it is also available during the start of multiballs on some later machines or as a reward for completing certain shots.

== B ==
backbox

The vertical box that sits at the head of the pinball machine. It holds the backglass, electronics of the game, a game display, and may hold speakers. Some digital game displays include a seven-segment display, DMD, or LCD. The backbox is also known as a lightbox or back rack.

backglass

The upright glass panel in the backbox, displaying the game's title and an illustration. The first backglass with lighted scoring appeared in 1935. Backglass production employs a reverse glass printing technique, with layers of color screen printed on the back of the glass, and can include unpainted sections to view displays for score or ball count. Backglasses are often treated as collectors' items due to their perceived artistic qualities.

ball

A single turn of the game, from plunging to draining. Most machines are set to either 3 or 5 balls per game.

ball lock

A mechanism during a game where achieving a certain shot will catch a ball and hold it in place. Ball lock is typically used to generate a multiball by collecting one or more additional balls which are then released simultaneously. Ball locks may either physically hold the ball(s) in place until the multiball or briefly hold the ball(s), maintaining a virtual count of the balls held.

ball saver

A feature in games that prevents the ball from being lost by draining. Historically, the ball saver was a physical component that would activate (such as magic post and magna-save) to block the space between the flippers; in modern machines the ball is allowed to drain and returned to the plunger and will either auto-launch or allow the player to re-launch it as the same ball in play. The amount of time that a ball save lasts varies from machine to machine and can be adjustable. Usually only available when starting with a new ball (to compensate for "unfair" very fast drains), it may also available during the start of multiballs or as a reward for completing certain shots. The mechanism that returns a drained ball to the plunger may also be called autosave.

ball search

On most solid state games, if no scoring activity is detected for a certain period of time, all solenoids in the game will cycle in sequence. If a ball is trapped by one of the moving components, this should free any balls that may have become stuck.

banana flippers

An experimental flipper design made of nylon and developed by Williams in the 1970s. The design was modeled after cestas used in jai alai and nicknamed for its curved shape, which distinguishes it from traditional straight flipper bats. The banana flipper was only ever released on Disco Fever and Time Warp machines.

bash target

A type of playfield target that does not have a standard appearance, but is designed to be forcefully hit by the pinball. It often strongly bounces the ball back towards the player or into another playfield element.

bonus (end-of-ball bonus)

Also called an end-of-ball bonus, these are additional points awarded when the ball leaves the playfield. The bonus may be a fixed amount per ball, but is usually determined by the activity during play such as achieving a shot, repeatedly hitting a shot, or pure chance. The bonus can take the form of a specific number of points or a multiplier that will increase the bonus by a factor. One of the earliest examples of a bonus is the 1939 machine, Nippy, but it became more common in the 1970s beginning with Snow Queen. A common penalty for tilting a machine is the loss of the end-of-ball bonus.

bumper

While the most recognized type is a pop bumper, it is broadly any component that stands vertical to the playfield for the ball to bounce (or bump) against. Originally bumpers were upright cylinders that provided an obstacle and ricochet point for the ball but did not score any points. Those "passive" or "dead" bumpers, advanced around the 1960s to detect a hit and register points and later to include a ring and solenoid that respond to a ball hit by actively shooting it off in another direction. These more widely known "active" bumpers have also been called "jet bumpers" by Williams, "thumper bumpers" by Bally Technologies, and "turbo bumpers" by Data East/Sega. Additional notable bumper types include slingshots, mushroom bumpers (passive and registers points), tower bumpers (passive and registers points), and disappearing bumpers.

buy-in

A feature in some pinball machines to continue the game after the last standard ball has drained, usually at a cost of one credit. Variable components of a buy-in include: the number of additional balls (one to three), availability of more buy-ins after the extra ball drains, and the inclusion of an automatic bonus or start of a mode. Some games also keep a separate high-score table for games completed using buy-in, to distinguish them from high scores achieved through traditional game play. The feature first appeared in 1934, known as a buy-back, and became more commonplace with solid state pinball machines, beginning with the Bally Midway Blackwater 100 in 1988.

== C ==
cabinet

the main body of a pinball machine; it holds the playfield, the glass, and the internal game play and payment mechanisms.

call-out

a sound bite (spoken words, or particular sound effect) that lets the player know that a certain pin shot or mode is going on in the game. This can indicate strategy or game state to the player without looking at the display.

captive ball

a pinball trapped on the playfield, either in one spot or with a limited area of motion. A popular example of a captive ball is visible in the patented design from 1995 by Williams, used in Theatre of Magic. This feature acts like a Newton's cradle to move the furthest pinball towards a target. Other tables use multiple stacked captive balls confined to a small area, such as Judge Dredd. Some unique examples of captive balls are the captive cue ball on the Cue Ball Wizard game and although not a ball, the mechanic in the Demolition Man game which features a series of captive toy cars.

coin door

the front-facing, often wide and rectangular panel on a pinball that contains coin slots and mechanisms to accept and validate coins for gameplay. It is designed to be wide enough to accommodate multiple coin slots and a coin box, and the internal coin mechanisms

combo

an immediate combination of different moves, often continuous ramp and/or orbit shots. Some machines, like Taxi, Theatre of Magic, and Demolition Man, reward combo shots by an increasing number of points, depending on the number of successful consecutive shots made.

conversion kit

special equipment sets that can be used to transform one pinball table into another. Kits can build on an existing pinball machine's theme while changing the rules, audio, and visuals, such as the conversion kit to update Black Rose to Black Rose: Skull and Bones, or may introduce an entirely new theme, such as converting Flash to the original game Asgard. Conversion kits can include boards, a translight or backglass, playfields, lights, and instructions.

credit

the allowance a player to play one game of pinball, usually as a result of depositing a coin. Additional credits can be awarded by completing certain objectives to earn Specials, getting a high score, or by matching the numbers at the end of a game.

credit dot

a small dot shown next to the credit indicator on solid-state machines, indicative of the machine's self-testing detecting a fault somewhere. Usually found on dot-matrix-display tables, and designed to be fairly subtle so as not to dissuade potential paying players.

credit reel

a wheel on EM pinball machines that represents how many credits have been earned.

== D ==
dead bumper

See passive bumper.

DMD

A dot-matrix display is a pixel-addressable display used to display the score and other status during the game. Almost always placed in the backbox (exception: Cirqus Voltaire). Most machines released from 1992 to 2016, starting with Data East's Checkpoint, released in 1991, feature this display. Some exceptions are the two VGA-driven Pinball 2000 series machines, pinball games that uses a LCD-display such as the machines from Jersey Jack Pinball and Heighway Pinball or retro style machines such as Whoa Nellie! Big Juicy Melons.

drain

The common term used to refer to the area beneath the flippers. If the ball rolls into the drain area via an outlane or between the flippers, it will be lost. Also refers to the act of losing a ball in this manner.

drop target

An upright, pressure-sensitive rectangle that drops below the playfield when hit by the ball. Drop targets are often arranged in so-called banks, and may require being hit in combination or in sequence to score or light special features.

== E ==
electro-mechanical (EM)

A pinball machine design that relies on relays, motors and switches to run, as opposed to transistors and integrated circuits. This design was phased out in the late 1970s. EM machines are easily recognized by their scoring displays that have mechanical score reels that spin to show the score. Newer machines are referred to as "solid state" (SS).

extra ball

An additional bonus ball that can be earned by achieving a specific task.

== F ==
flipper

A tapered bat, typically found in pairs at the bottom of the table, that is the player's primary means of controlling the ball. Normally a downward slope extending the bottom structure of the table, one end is moved upward in an arc when the player taps the appropriate button.

flipper button

A pushbutton which is pushed by players to control the flipper. Typically one on each side of the cabinet.

== G ==
GI

An acronym of general illumination, this refers to the lights on the playfield used simply to make the playfield visible in a dark room. Also known as street lighting.

gobble hole

A hole in a pinball table that ends the game or the current ball if the ball falls in it. On most games with this feature, the gobble hole will be lit for a special and/or a large number of points once some other in-game objective has been completed. One game with this feature is Slick Chick.

== H ==
habitrail

A wireform path for the ball to travel along. They may be straight or consist of curving paths and loops. May consist of either two wires on the bottom, or four wires to fully enclose the ball.

homebrew

"Homebrew" pinball machines are unofficial, unlicensed, pinball machines. Sometimes they are one-of-a-kind games typically made by fans or small groups.

house ball

A term for when the ball bounces directly into the drain after plunging without giving the player a chance to hit the ball with the flippers; sometimes also called "SDtM", short for "straight down the middle".

hurry-up mode

An optional side mode in which the player is challenged to complete a task within a brief time limit to earn bonus points. Traditionally, hurry-ups start with a large point value, which rapidly decreases over several seconds; completing the task stops the countdown and awards its value. Another common variant is to use a hurry-up to determine the shot value of a mode that starts immediately afterward, where it can be collected multiple times.

== I ==
inlane

A lane that is designed to feed the ball to the flippers, to facilitate continued play. Also called a ball-return lane. Contrast outlanes, which feed balls towards the drain.

== J ==
jackpot

A specially designated point bonus; typically among the highest amounts that can be scored with one shot. In earlier games (mid-late 80s), scoring the Jackpot was the ultimate goal of the game, requiring the player to complete a precise and difficult set of tasks to score it. The Jackpot would continue to build slowly over many games until it was scored. More modern games simply call any multiball shot award a "jackpot" and the values are more downplayed.

== K ==
kickback

A launching mechanism located inside an outlane that sends the ball back into play.

kickout hole

A depression in the pinball table that the ball can fall into. This is usually just large enough for the ball to fit into it. After gaining some points, and/or adjusting the game state, the ball is kicked back into play in a predictable direction and speed.

knocker

A solenoid designed to loudly thump against the machine's cabinet, as a distinct audible signal. Most often used to herald a replay, extra ball, match or special award, but can also be used to report error codes on certain machines. Certain newer machines lack a physical knocker and instead play a synthesized version of its sound through the speakers.

== L ==
lane

A lane is in general any area of the table just wide enough to let the ball pass through. Special kinds of lanes are inlanes and outlanes; both types are situated at the bottom of the playing field. The outlanes are at the far ends and connect to the bottom (causing loss of the ball), the inlanes are next to them and connect to the flipper area.

lock

A mechanism that traps the ball on the playfield and triggers a new ball to be added to the playfield. A locked ball can then later be released to start a multiball. Some games may use "virtual locks" which still allow a player to progress towards a multiball without physically trapping a ball on the playfield, instead launching multiple balls into play using an auto-plunger when the start of multiball is triggered.

lockdown bar

The common name of the metal piece (or wood on woodrail games) at the bottom of the playfield, which keeps the playfield cover glass from sliding out. Often labeled "Front Molding" in the manual. Usually removed via a latch inside the coin door, allowing the playfield glass to be slid out and the playfield then removed.

loop

Synonym, usually, for orbit.

== M ==
magic post

A post that can rise up between the flipper fingers and completely block the middle drain. Sometimes also called a recovery post or up post.

Magna-save

A feature that allows the player to activate a magnet located just below the entrance to an outlane. A ball headed for the outlane will be held by the magnet and diverted to the corresponding inlane instead. Williams Electronics pioneered this feature on the Black Knight game.

match

The chance to win a free game after the last ball has drained. On most machines the free game is received when the last two digits of the score match a pseudo randomly picked two digit number. The winning chance can be altered by the operator. Most modern games incorporate a short animated skit that culminates in the match number selection.

mode

A configuration of the table where specific goals must be met in a limited time to score points, hitting specific lanes or dropping specific targets, sometimes combined with multiball. Some tables have multiple modes that must be activated in order, usually building up to an "ultimate" last mode or the wizard mode where the most points can be scored.

multiball (multi-ball)

A situation where a series of balls are shot onto the playfield. Multiballs are either a mode that can be selected by the player, or can be triggered in the pinball machine that forces the other balls to roll on the playfield.

== N ==
nudging

A term for the player shaking the machine to change the movement of the ball, commonly to try to prevent the ball draining down an outlane.

== O ==
orbit

A path for the ball that hugs the outer rim of the game. Orbits generally have a slingshot effect; sending the ball into an orbit generally means it returns immediately from another lane. Orbits are generally named for the side of the playfield on which the ball enters (e.g. the "left orbit" means the ball enters the orbit on the left side and travels to the right). Also referred to as loops.

outlane

See lane. The outlanes are generally the outside lanes at the sides of the playfield that lead the ball to the drain (sometimes with a possibility of striking a peg and re-entering the adjacent inlane). Some games, such as the 1980 Bally game Fathom have reversed inlanes and outlanes, where the outer lane returns the ball to the flippers and the inner lane returns the ball to the drain.

== P ==
passive bumper

A bumper which does not kick the ball when hit, although it may register a score or play a sound effect. Also known as a dead bumper.

peg

A small, stationary vertical post with a rubber ring, designed to deflect the ball away from sensitive parts and to reject poorly-aimed shots. Some games place a peg between the flippers, giving the ball a chance to bounce away from the drain and back onto the flippers (see also "magic post" and "stopper").

Pinball 2000

A line of pinball tables created by Bally / Williams in the late 1990s that features more graphical Video Modes due to them having VGA monitors as opposed to the DMDs in earlier games. Only two Pinball 2000 games were created: Revenge from Mars and Star Wars: Episode I - The Phantom Menace.

playfield

The main flat surface of the game, on which targets, ramps, orbits, flippers and bumpers are arranged. "Playfield" refers both to the surface itself and to the overall play area (to distinguish it from other parts of the machine such as the backbox). The ball rolls along this surface. Many games refer to the "lower" playfield (nearest the player) and the "upper" playfield (nearest the backbox). In some cases, this distinction is more literal, as in the separate, vertically-arranged playfield levels in Black Knight 2000.

plunger

A player-controlled, spring-loaded rod that allows the player to send the ball into the game. The plunger is usually located at the bottom right corner of the pinball machine. Some games like FunHouse have two plungers, and others have autoplungers triggered by a button press, trigger pull or other game action. Sometimes referred to as a shooter knob.

pop bumper

Round, mushroom-shaped targets set into the playfield of most pinball machines. They register a hit when the ball collides with them, and trigger some mechanism, usually a downward-actuating metal ring, to forcefully kick the ball away. Also referred to as active bumpers, jet bumpers (on Williams tables) or thumper bumpers (on Bally tables).

popper

A device that launches the ball vertically, often to a raised playfield. Also called a vertical up-kicker (VUK).

pure mechanical (PM)

The oldest and simplest type of pinball game, with no electrical or electronic elements as part of its operation, such as Whiffle, Baffle Ball or Ballyhoo; these games operate completely through mechanical interactions, and typically feature static playfields. PM games are directly evolved from bagatelle and billard japonais, adding coin operation and mechanical resetting, and subsequently evolved into EM games.

== R ==
ramp

A section of the playfield with a raised gradient. Ramps generally lead either to raised playfields, habitrails, or to inlanes.

replay

A reward received after a certain score is reached. Most often a free game, but sometimes is an extra ball instead. Often heralded by the game's knocker.

rollover

A flat switch residing in the playfield itself. A rollover is activated when the ball rolls over it; these can present as wireforms, buttons, or even opto-electric sensors.

rollunder

Similar to the rollover above, a rollunder is a switch triggered by the ball rolling under it, sometimes presenting as a one-way gate to prevent, for instance, a launched ball from rolling back into the plunger lane. Other times, a rollunder is just a wireform switch that registers when the ball has rolled under it.

== S ==
scoop/saucer

A hole that catches the ball.

score motor

A motor in an EM pinball cabinet used primarily to ensure that score reels are updated correctly. It activates relays repeatedly until a specific task is completed. Also known as a "cam timer".

score display

A type of display that was common in pinball games from the 1980s to the early 1990s. The early score display based games have standard numeric displays. Alphanumeric displays started appearing in mid 1980s games, though the first pinball game that used one was Hyperball by Williams in 1981.

score reels

Score reels are wheels on many EM pinball machines that represent the player's score. They started appearing on pinball machines in the 1950s, replacing the previous style of painted number scoring on the backglass where numbers would light up to indicate the score. Each player would have their own line of reels. Machines would range from having as few as three reels per player with others having up to seven. Some early score reel based games would represent 1000 points with an extra white square that would light up and show a number one when the player earns that many points.

shooter lane

The lane which leads from the trough/plunger to the playfield, also called the plunger lane. (see also: lane.)

skill shot

A bonus awarded to the player for completing a specific task when releasing the ball. Most games that include skill shots require the player to either plunge the ball with just the right amount of force to hit a specific target, or to make a specific shot with the flippers as the first shot once the ball is on the playfield. (Not to be confused with "combo shot".)

slam tilt

Typically, the most severe penalty a solid-state pinball game can mete out for a player's rough handling. This particular form of tilt is given if the machine is nudged with such violence that it risks damaging the hardware. Such an action generally sounds an alarm and causes the machine to reset, ending ALL players' games in progress (hence voiding the credit). A slam tilt is sometimes also given if force is applied to the coin box (e.g., directly kicking it).

slingshot

Typically triangular-shaped playfield elements that house a kicker solenoid that acts on a thick rubber band, somewhat resembling the namesake handheld weapon in action. When a ball comes into contact with the slingshot with enough force to trigger a switch, the kicker fires and tries to bat the ball away forcefully via the rubber band. Most often found near the flippers, but sometimes can be placed in other spots hidden by playfield plastics. Also called slingshot bumpers, kickers, or kicking rubbers.

solenoid

A coil, with another coil or magnet inside, used in flippers, kickers, and other mechanical devices. When the coils are energized, the opposing magnetic fields cause the inner piece to move. Solenoids are the principal method that pinball machines use to create movement in mechanical objects on the playfield. For their non-pinball use, see solenoid.

solid-state (SS)

A pinball machine that relies on integrated circuits as opposed to relays and switches. This design was introduced in the mid-1970s. These are typically recognized by scoring displays that are digital as opposed to mechanical scoring reels. Older machines are referred to as electro-mechanical (EM) pinball games.

special

An award given by achieving a specific, usually difficult task (e.g. lighting all monsters and their instruments in Monster Bash), or as a consolation prize for an outlane or gobble-hole drain if other conditions are met beforehand. The actual award for a special can usually be configured; sometimes it is just a large amount of points, other times an extra ball; however, the term is most often associated with the awarding of a free game. See also replay.

spinner

A target that is on the playfield and when hit by the ball, rotates and awards points with each rotation.

standup target (stand-up target, spot target)

A standing target on a playfield, similar to a drop target, but which does not drop into the playfield when struck.

staging

A technique where a player partially depresses a flipper button to activate the lower flipper without activating the corresponding upper flipper. On games with only two flippers, this cannot be accomplished.

stopper

A small metal post, often with a rubber ring, typically found between and slightly below the bottom flippers. If the ball hits the post, it will bounce up and away, saving it from draining. Skilled players can use the stopper to make trick shots. On some tables, the stopper is made available only as a reward. (See also: peg, magic post)

subway

A track underneath the playfield that moves the ball from one spot on the playfield to another. Usually the ball drops into a hole, and is then ejected from the subway back onto the playfield by a solenoid.

Superpin

A trade name used by Williams and Bally to refer to their widebody machines.

Super Game

An alternative gameplay mode for the Judge Dredd game where a two-ball multiball mode will begin automatically at the start of each ball. Two credits are required to activate this feature.

== T ==
target

Mechanical switches which are activated by the ball to earn points, light indicators, and/or advance the game. Examples would be rollovers, standup targets, spinners, bumpers, etc.

tilt

The penalty given to a player who is too physically rough with a pinball game. A tilt mechanism detects when the machine is being lifted, bumped, tilted or shaken beyond an acceptable level. Originally designed to prevent players from lifting the front of the machine to cause balls to roll backwards, it also helps prevent damage to the machine's hardware, body and legs by discouraging players from shaking the machine too hard. When one of a machine's tilt-sensing mechanisms is triggered (most often an adjustable plumb-bob within a metal ring, though other methods exist), the machine "tilts", ending play for the current ball and usually forfeiting any bonuses earned (if it is the last ball, and the player has no extra balls left, the game is automatically over). Most solid-state games from the 1980s onwards (and a rare few EM machines) provide a configurable number of tilt warnings before penalizing a player with a full tilt. Some EM games, usually older ones, would void an entire game upon a tilt; solid-state games typically reserve such a severe penalty for a slam tilt instead.

Token-Pin

A pinball machine that dispenses souvenir coins. The only Token-Pin game made was Safe Cracker.

topper

An extra decoration that sits on top of the backbox of the machine that is typically an extension of the theme of the game. Early toppers were simple signs but by the 1980's they would illuminate or would move in sync with events in the game. Some modern toppers will light up with progress in the game and can unlock levels.

toy

Many pinball machines have unique objects on or above the playfield to enhance the theme of the game. They are called "toys" mainly because they often resemble children's toys and are specific to the machine in question. Some directly impact gameplay, while others are non-interactive or purely cosmetic. For example, Twilight Zone features two significant toys: The gumball machine (which stores and releases balls), and a working analog clock (which is used to show the time remaining in various game modes). Other examples of gameplay-affecting toys are the spinning soccer ball in World Cup Soccer and the Frankenstein's Monster from Mary Shelley's Frankenstein that throws balls onto the table during one of its Multiball modes.

translight

The plastic or glass sheet in the backbox, generally displaying the game's main illustration on a translucent piece of printed plastic, allowing light to pass through. Also called the "backglass". The term "translight" (or "translite") usually refers more specifically to the printed plastic in modern pinball games using dot-matrix displays, since those displays are mounted underneath the glass, not behind it, allowing the artwork to be one single unmodified sheet.

== U ==
up post

See magic post.

up-kicker

An electro-mechanical feature that physically propels the ball upwards onto a second-tier playfield, as used in Gottlieb's Haunted House.

== V ==
vari-target

A target that can be moved by the ball by a varying amount. Normally this directly corresponds to the number of points received, as it is usually risky trying to shoot the narrow target with full force.

video mode

a game mode played on the display of the machine

Vitrigraph

Gottlieb's patented photo-realistic mylar overlay for pinball playfields rather than the industry standard silk screen on the wood.

VUK

Short for vertical up-kicker. Synonym for popper.

== W ==
wedge head

Trapezoidal-shaped cabinet backboxes when viewed from the front. The term is most usually associated with many Gottlieb single-player games of the 1960s and 1970s. When the bottom of the backbox is wider than the top, it is referred to as a Reverse Wedge Head.

whitewood

The prototype playfield used in early design stages before any artwork is applied.

widebody

Pinball machines that are wider than a standard machine, allowing for more features on the playfield. Examples include Genie, Twilight Zone, Indiana Jones: The Pinball Adventure, Demolition Man, and Guns N' Roses.

wizard mode (wizard bonus)

A special mode or bonus, started only after completing a long and difficult series of tasks in a pinball machine. The first wizard bonus was the "king's ransom" in 1989's Black Knight 2000. As rulesets have gotten more complicated, many modern games offer smaller "mini-wizard" modes as challenging tasks for intermediate players. The term is a reference to the song "Pinball Wizard" by The Who.

woodrail

Pinball machines manufactured prior to appr. 1961 that used wood to frame the playfield glass.

== See also ==
- List of pinball machines
- List of pinball manufacturers
