= PV-2000 =

Home computer

Casio PV-2000
- Manufacturer: Casio
- Type: home computer
- Released: JP: 1983
- Introductory price: 29,800¥
- Media: ROM cartridge
- Operating system: C83-BASIC v 1.0
- CPU: PD-780C @ 3.579 MHz
- Memory: 4 KB
- Display: 256 x 192 resolution, 15 colours
- Graphics: TMS9918A
- Sound: SN76489AN
- Input: Joystick

The PV-2000, also known as RakuGaki, is a home computer manufactured by Casio and released in Japan in 1983, with a launch price of ¥29,800. It has similar hardware to MSX machines, but uses a different sound chip, memory allocations and BIOS.

== History ==
The PV-2000 was released shortly after the PV-1000 game console. It was intended as a home computer and featured an integrated keyboard. It is compatible with PV-1000 controllers but not its games, as it features a different architecture.

== Technical details ==
The PV-2000 was powered by a NEC PD-780C CPU (compatible with the Zilog Z80) running at 3.579Mhz, with 4 KB RAM, and 16 KB of VRAM. It had a TMS9918A graphics chip capable of generating 256×192 pixels graphics with 15 colours and 32 sprites. Sound was produced by a SN76489AN with three channel sound capability with 4 octaves. The operating system was C83-BASIC v 1.0, similar to MSX BASIC.

== PV-2000 games ==
Only eleven games were released for the Casio PV-2000, listed here by serial number:

- GPB-101: Roc'n Rope
- GPB-102: Mr. Packn
- GPB-103: Galaga
- GPB-104: Pooyan
- GPB-105: Super Cobra
- GPB-106: Front Line
- GPB-107: Ski Command
- GPB-108: Pachinko UFO
- GPB-109: Rakugaki Special
- GPB-110: Excite Mahjong 2
- GPB-111: Exciting Jockey

Certain games such as Ski Command and Pachinko UFO were also released on MSX.

== See also ==
- PV-1000
- Casio PV-7
- Casio Loopy
