= Electronic Games =

US video game magazine

- Issue #1 (Winter 1981)
- Frequency: Monthly
- Publisher: 1st run: Reese Publishing Company, Inc. Katz Kunkel Worley Inc.
- Founder: Bill Kunkel, Arnie Katz, Joyce Worley
- First issue: 1st run: October 29, 1981; 2nd run: October 1992
- Final issue: 1st run: August 1985; 2nd run: January 1997
- Country: United States
- Language: English
- ISSN: 0730-6687

Electronic Games was the first dedicated video game magazine published in the United States and ran from October 15, 1981, to 1997 under different titles. It was co-founded by Bill Kunkel, Joyce Worley, and Arnie Katz.

== History ==
The history of Electronic Games originates in the consumer electronics magazine, Video. Initially video games were covered sporadically in Deeny Kaplan's regular "VideoTest Reports" column. In the summer of 1979, Video decided to launch a new column to focus on video games. Arcade Alley became a regular column and would represent a journalistic first. Written by Bill Kunkel, Arnie Katz (initially pseudonymously writing as Frank T. Laney II), and Joyce Worley, the three writers became close friends and in 1981 they founded Electronic Games magazine. The magazine was active from Winter 1981, during the golden age of arcade video games and the second generation of consoles, up until 1985, following the video game crash of 1983. The magazine was briefly revived during the 16-bit era in the early 1990s, but ended in 1995 and was renamed to Fusion.

Initially, the release of the first issue was scheduled for October 15, 1981. However, the release was postponed to October 29, 1981 and featured a slightly different cover than initially advertised.

=== 1st Run ===
Title	Start Cover Date	End Cover Date
Electronic Games	October 29, 1981	April 1985
Computer Entertainment	May 1985	August 1985

=== 2nd Run ===
Title	Start Cover Date	End Cover Date
Electronic Games	October 1992	July 1995
Fusion	August 1995	February 1996
Intelligent Gamer's Fusion	March 1996	May 1996
Intelligent Gamer	June 1996	January 1997

== Arcade Express & Electronic Games Hotline ==
In August 1982, the editing staff at Electronic Games began a biweekly newsletter titled Arcade Express to supplement the magazine. The newsletter contained news updates, reviews, and high score compilations. In the August 15, 1983 issue, the newsletter's name was changed to Electronic Games Hotline. Arcade Express and Electronic Games Hotline ran for a total of 53 issues with its last issue dated to August 14, 1984.

== Arcade Awards ==
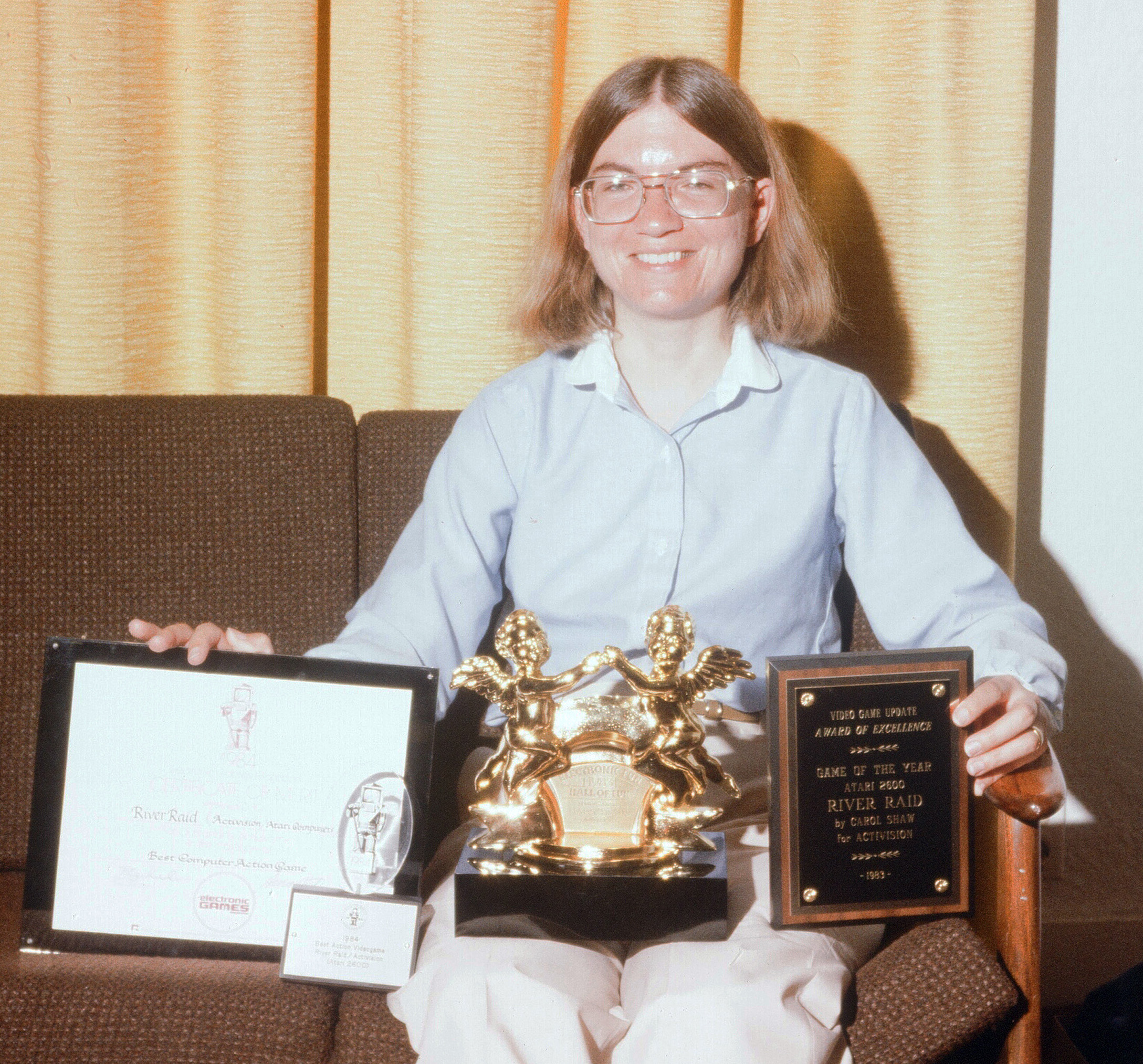
Carol Shaw with several awards for River Raid (1982). Her "Certificate of Merit" from Electronic Games can be seen in the bottom left corner.

Electronic Games hosted the Arcade Awards, or Arkie Awards, the first "Game of the Year" award ceremony simultaneously running in Video's "Arcade Alley" column. The following games are the winners of the magazine's annual Arcade Awards. The awards for each year took place in the January of the following year. No single game was allowed to win more than one award in the same year.

=== 1980 Arcade Awards (1979) ===
According to the Winter 1981 issue of Electronic Games, the 1980 Arcade Awards (i.e., the first set of "Arkies") were announced in February 1980 and covered all hardware and software produced prior to January 1, 1980.

Award	Winner	Platform
Game of the Year	Space Invaders	Arcade
Best Pong Variant	Video Olympics	Atari VCS
Best Sports Game	Football	Bally Professional Arcade
Best Target Game	Air-Sea Battle	Atari VCS
Best S.F. Game	Cosmic Conflict	Odyssey²
Best Solitaire Game	Golf	Odyssey²
Most Innovative Game	Basketball	Atari VCS
Best Audio and Visual Effects	Bally	Arcade/Bally

=== 1981 Arcade Awards (1980) ===
The 1981 edition of the awards reflects accomplishments during the 12 months of the preceding year.

Award	Winner	Platform
Arcade
Best Coin-Op Electronic Game	Asteroids	Arcade
Console
Game of the Year	Superman	Atari VCS
Best Target/WarGame	Armored Battle	Intellivision
Best Pong Variant	Volleyball	Odyssey²
Best S.F. Game	Space Battle	Intellivision
Best Audio-Visual Effects	Fishing Derby	Atari VCS
Best Solitaire Game	Skiing	Atari VCS
Best Sports Game	NASL Soccer	Intellivision
Most Innovative Game	Adventure	Atari VCS

=== 1982 Arcade Awards (1981) ===
The third annual Arcade Awards were sponsored jointly by Video and Electronic Games and honored outstanding achievements in the field of video games of the year 1981. The 1982 Arcade Awards were published in the March 1982 issue of Electronic Games.

Award	Winner	Platform(s)	Honorable Mention
Coin-Op Division (Arcade)
Best Commercial Arcade Game	Pac-Man	Namco Pac-Man	Defender, Battlezone
Console
Videogame of the Year	Asteroids	Atari VCS	Quest for the Rings (Odyssey²), Missile Command (Atari VCS), UFO! (Odyssey²)
Most Innovative Game	Quest for the Rings	Odyssey²	Freeway (Atari VCS), Asteroids (Atari VCS)
Best Competitive Game	Tennis	Atari VCS	
Best Solitaire Game	Missile Command	Atari VCS	Dodge 'Em (Atari)
Best S.F game	UFO!	Odyssey²	Laser Blast (Activision)
Best Sports Game	Auto Racing	Intellivision	Tennis (Atari VCS)
Best Pong Variant	Warlords	Atari VCS	
Best Audio-Visual Effects	Kaboom!	Atari VCS	
Computer
Computer Game of the Year	Star Raiders	Atari 8-bit	
Best Computer Action Game	Jawbreaker	Atari 8-bit, Apple II, Commodore 64	
Best Computer Sports Game	Computer Baseball	Apple II	

=== 1983 Arcade Awards (1982) ===
The 4th "Arkies" cover games published between October 1, 1981, and October 1, 1982, and were published in the January 1983 issue of Electronic Games.

Award	Winner	Certificate of Merit
Coin-Op Game Awards (Arcade)
Coin-Op Game of the Year	Tron	Ms. Pac-Man; Donkey Kong
Best Science Fiction/Fantasy Coin-Op Game	Bosconian	Zaxxon; Gravitar
Best Coin-Op Game Audio/Visual Effects	Turbo	
Most Innovative Coin-Op Game	Tempest	Lady Bug; Qix
Videogame Awards (Console)
Videogame of the Year	Demon Attack (Atari VCS)	
Best Solitaire Videogame	Donkey Kong (ColecoVision)	
Best Arcade-to-Home Videogame Translation	Frogger (Atari VCS)	Galactic Invasion (Bally Astrocade)
Best Action Videogame	Chopper Command (Atari VCS)	
Best Adventure Videogame	Pitfall! (Atari VCS)	
Computer Game Division
Computer Game of the Year	David's Midnight Magic (Apple II)	Bandits (Apple II)
Best Computer Adventure	Deadline (Apple II)	Kabul Spy (Apple II)
Best Arcade/Action Computer Game	K-Razy Shoot-Out (Atari 400/800)	Star Blazer (Apple II)
Best Solitaire Computer Game	Snack Attack (Apple II)	Neptune (Apple II)
Stand-Alone Game Awards (Dedicated)
Stand-Alone Game of the Year	Galaxian (Coleco Mini-Arcade)	Scramble (Tomytronic); Super Cobra (Entex)
Best Mini-Arcade Game Cartridge	Scramble (Vectrex)	

=== 1984 Arcade Awards (1983) ===
The 5th "Arkies" were published in the January 1984 issue of Electronic Games.

Award	Winner	Certificate of Merit
Electronic Game of the Year (Overall)
Electronic Game of the Year	Miner 2049er	
Coin-Op Games Division (Arcade)
Coin-Op Game of the Year	Pole Position	Front Line; Super Pac-Man
Best Science Fiction/Fantasy Coin-Op Game	Xevious	Jungle Hunt; Star Trek
Most Innovative Coin-Op Game	Q*bert	Baby Pac-Man
Best Coin-Op Game Audio/Visual Effects	Dragon's Lair	BurgerTime; Popeye
Videogame Division (Console)
Videogame of the Year (Less than 16K ROM memory)	Ms. Pac-Man (Atari 2600)	BurgerTime (Intellivision)
Videogame of the Year (16K or more ROM memory)	Lady Bug (ColecoVision)	Zaxxon (ColecoVision)
Best Science Fiction/Fantasy Videogame	Vanguard (Atari 5200)	Moon Patrol (Atari 2600)
Best Videogame Audio/Visual Effects	Donkey Kong Jr. (ColecoVision)	Qix (Atari 5200)
Best Action Videogame	River Raid (Atari 2600)	Polaris (Atari 2600); Super Cobra (Atari 2600)
Best Adventure Game	Advanced Dungeons & Dragons (Intellivision)	Jungle Hunt (Atari 2600); Tutankham (Atari 2600, ColecoVision, Intellivision, Odyssey²)
Best Arcade-to-Home Videogame Translation	Kangaroo (Atari 5200)	Turtles (Odyssey²)
Computer Game Division
Computer Game of the Year	Lode Runner (Apple II)	Repton (Apple II, Atari 8-bit)
Electronic Game of the Year (Players Pick)	Miner 2049er (Apple II, Atari 8-bit)	
Best Computer Adventure	Witness (Apple II, Atari 8-bit, Commodore 64, IBM PC)	Aztec (Apple II); The Dark Crystal (Apple II, Atari 8-bit); Wizardry II: The Knight of Diamonds (Apple II)
Best Computer Action Game	Centipede (Atari 8-bit)	Jumpman (Atari 8-bit)
Most Humorous Computer Game	Free Fall (Apple II)	Preppie! II (Atari 8-bit)
Best Arcade-to-Home Computer Game Translation	Frogger (Atari 8-bit)	
Best Multi-Player Computer Game	M.U.L.E. (Atari 8-bit)	Oil Barons (Apple II)
Best Educational Computer Game	Learning With the Leeper (Apple II)	
Most Innovative Computer Game	Archon: The Light and the Dark (Atari 8-bit)	Moondust (Commodore 64)
Stand-Alone Games Division
Stand-Alone Game of the Year	Q*bert (Parker Brothers)	Donkey Kong Jr. (Coleco Mini-Arcade; Ms. Pac-Man (Coleco Mini-Arcade)
Mini-Arcade Game of the Year	3-D Sky Attack (Tomytronic 3D)	Emergency (Hattori); Space Invaders (Tiger)

=== 1985 Arkie Awards (1984) ===
The 6th "Arkies" were printed in the January 1985 issue of Electronic Games.

Award	Winner
Electronic Game of the Year (Overall)
Electronic Game of the Year	One on One: Dr. J vs. Larry Bird
Coin-Op Game Division (Arcade)
Coin-Op of the Year	Star Wars
Most Innovative Coin-Op Game	Punch-Out
Best Coin-Op Audio-Visual Effects	TX-1
Certificates of Merit	Crystal Castles; Elevator Action; M.A.C.H. 3 Tag Team Wrestling; Track & Field
Videogame Division (Console)
Videogame of the Year	Space Shuttle (Atari 2600)
Best Action Videogame	Buck Rogers (Atari 2600/5200, ColecoVision, Intellivision, SG-1000)
Best Adventure Videogame	Pitfall II (Atari 2600)
Best Videogame Audio-Visual Effects	Congo Bongo (ColecoVision, Atari 5200, Intellivision)
Certificates of Merit	Battlezone (Atari 2600); Bump 'n' Jump (Atari 2600, Intellivision, ColecoVision); Frogger II (Atari 2600/5200, ColecoVision); Montezuma's Revenge (Atari 2600/5200, ColecoVision); Robotron (Atari 5200)
Computer Game Division
Computer Game of the Year	Ultima III: Exodus (Apple II, Atari 8-bit, Commodore 64)
Electronic Game of the Year (Players Pick)	One on One (Apple II, Atari 8-bit, Commodore 64)
Best Computer Adventure Game	Gateway to Apshai (Atari 400/800, Commodore 64)
Most Humorous Video Computer Game	Quest for Tires (Apple II, Atari 8-bit, Commodore 64, IBM PC, MSX)
Best Arcade-to-Home Translation	Joust (Commodore 64)
Electronic Educational Game of the Year	Agent USA (Apple II, Atari 8-bit, Commodore 64)
Certificates of Merit	Beyond Castle Wolfenstein (Apple II, Atari 8-bit, Commodore 64); Bruce Lee (Amstrad CPC, Apple II, Atari 8-bit, Commodore 64, PC-88, Spectrum); Drol (Apple II, Atari 8-bit, Commodore 64); Infidel (Apple II, Atari 8-bit, Commodore 64, IBM PC, Macintosh, TRS-80); Parthian Kings (Apple II); Pharaoh's Pyramid (Atari 8-bit, Commodore 64); Pole Position (Atari 8-bit, BBC Micro, Commodore 64, Spectrum, TI-99/4A, VIC-20); Seven Cities of Gold (Apple IIe, Atari 8-bit, Commodore 64); Wizardry III: Legacy of Llylgamyn (Apple II); Zaxxon (Apple II, Atari 8-bit, Commodore 64, TRS-80)
Stand-Alone Games Division
Stand-Alone Game of the Year	Zaxxon (Coleco Mini-Arcade)
Mini-Arcade Game of the Year	Miner 2049er (Tiger)
Certificates of Merit	Donkey Kong II (Game & Watch); Mario's Cement Factory (Game & Watch); Reversi Master (VTech)

=== 1992 (7th) ===
Following the magazine's revival in 1992, it published the Electronic Gaming Awards in March 1993, where editors nominated several games for each category and the readers would vote which games win. The following were the winners and nominees for 1992.

Award	Winner	Platform(s)	Honorable Mention(s)
Video Game of the Year	Street Fighter II	SNES	Sonic the Hedgehog 2
Computer Game of the Year	Wing Commander II	MS-DOS	Indiana Jones and the Fate of Atlantis
Multimedia Game of the Year	Night Trap	Sega CD	Dragon Slayer: The Legend of Heroes; Loom
Portable Game of the Year	The G.G. Shinobi II: The Silent Fury	Game Gear	Star Wars
Best Electronic Game Graphics	Sonic the Hedgehog 2	Sega Genesis	—N/a
Best Electronic Game Sound	The Adventures of Willy Beamish	PC	Space Megaforce
Best Action Video Game	Street Fighter II	SNES	—N/a
Best Action/Action Strategy Computer Game	Spear of Destiny	PC	Super Space Invaders
Best Adventure/RPG Video Game	Final Fantasy Mystic Quest	SNES	Equinox
Best Adventure/RPG Computer Game	Ultima VII	PC	Indiana Jones and the Fate of Atlantis
Best Strategy Computer Game	Civilization	PC	SimAnt
Best Strategy/Action Strategy Video Game	Desert Strike	Game consoles	Rampart
Best Sports Video Game	John Madden Football '93	Game consoles	NHLPA Hockey '93
Best Sports Computer Game	John Madden Football II	PC	4D Sports Boxing
Most Humorous Electronic Game	Road Runner's Death Valley Rally	SNES	The Adventures of Willy Beamish
Best Science Fiction or Fantasy Electronic Game	Super Star Wars	SNES	Wing Commander II
Best Fanzine	Computer Gaming Update	—N/a	Digital Press

=== 1993 (8th) ===
The following games were the winners and nominees for the EG Awards of 1993, with nominees chosen by editors and winners voted by readers.

Award	Winner	Platform	Honorable Mention(s)
Video Game of the Year	Aladdin	Sega Genesis	Rock & Roll Racing
Computer Game of the Year	Alone in the Dark	PC	Star Wars: X-Wing
Console Multimedia Game of the Year	Sonic CD	Sega CD	Voyeur
Computer Multimedia Game of the Year	Day of the Tentacle	PC	Return to Zork; Seventh Guest
Portable Game of the Year	Mortal Kombat	Game Gear	The Legend of Zelda: Link's Awakening
Best Action Video Game	Cool Spot	Sega Genesis	Batman Returns; Road Rash II
Best Adventure/RPG Computer Game	Lands of Lore	PC	Ultima Underworld II
Best Action Strategy/Strategy Video Game	The Lost Vikings	SNES	X-Men
Best Action/Action Strategy Computer Game	Lemmings 2 Prince of Persia 2	PC	
Best Strategy Computer Game	Syndicate	PC	The Even More Incredible Machine
Best Sports Video Game	NHL '94	Game consoles	Mutant League Football
Best Sports Computer Game	NHL Hockey	PC	IndyCar Racing
Best Electronic Gaming Audio/Visual Effects	Ecco	Sega Genesis	Myst
Best Science Fiction or Fantasy Electronic Game	Dune II	PC	Star Fox
Best Electronic Military Simulation	Warlords II	PC	Liberty or Death; Clash of Steel
Most Humorous Electronic Game	ClayFighter	SNES	Zombies Ate My Neighbors
Best Electronic Gaming Fanzine	Digital Press	—N/a	

== Reader polls ==
From May 1982 onwards, the magazine carried out a reader poll in each issue to see which are the most popular games of the month among its readers, up until the January 1985 issue. The top-ranking games in these polls are listed below.

=== 1982 ===
May

- Console: Asteroids (Runner-Up: Missile Command)
- Computer: Star Raiders (Runner-Up: Space Invaders)
- Arcade: Pac-Man (Runner-Up: Asteroids)

August

- Console: Pac-Man (Runner-Up: Missile Command)
- Computer: Star Raiders (Runner-Up: Jawbreaker)
- Arcade: Pac-Man (Runner-Up: Tempest)

September

- Console: Pac-Man (Runner-Up: Missile Command)
- Computer: Star Raiders (Runner-Up: Missile Command)
- Arcade: Pac-Man (Runner-Up: Donkey Kong)

October & November

- Console: Defender (Runner-Up: Pac-Man)
- Computer: Star Raiders (Runner-Up: Missile Command)
- Arcade: Tempest (Runner-Up: Donkey Kong)

The games that were top-ranked the most in these 1982 polls were:

- Console: Pac-Man (Runner-Up: Defender)
- Computer: Star Raiders (Runner-Up: Missile Command)
- Arcade: Pac-Man (Runner-Up: Tempest)

=== 1983 ===
January

- Console: Pitfall! (Runner-Up: Berzerk)
- Computer: Star Raiders (Runner-Up: Pac-Man)
- Arcade: Donkey Kong (Runner-Up: Dig Dug)

May

- Console: Pitfall! (Runner-Up: Donkey Kong)
- Computer: Star Raiders (Runner-Up: Pac-Man)
- Arcade: Donkey Kong

June

- Console: Donkey Kong (Runner-Up: Zaxxon)
- Computer: Star Raiders (Runner-Up: Pac-Man)
- Arcade: Donkey Kong (Runner-Up: Tron)

July

- Console: Pitfall! (Runner-Up: Donkey Kong)
- Computer: Star Raiders (Runner-Up: Pac-Man)
- Arcade: Donkey Kong (Runner-Up: Donkey Kong Jr.)

August

- Console: Donkey Kong (Runner-Up: Pitfall!)
- Computer: Pac-Man (Runner-Up: Star Raiders)
- Arcade: Zaxxon (Runner-Up: Joust)

September

- Console: Donkey Kong Jr. (Runner-Up: Lady Bug)
- Computer: Star Raiders (Runner-Up: Centipede)
- Arcade: Pole Position (Runner-Up: Donkey Kong Jr.)

October

- Console: Donkey Kong (Runner-Up: River Raid)
- Computer: Star Raiders (Runner-Up: Pac-Man)
- Arcade: Pole Position (Runner-Up: Donkey Kong)

November

- Console: Donkey Kong Jr. (Runner-Up: Zaxxon)
- Computer: Star Raiders (Runner-Up: Pac-Man)
- Arcade: Pole Position (Runner-Up: Q*bert)

December

- Console: Donkey Kong Jr. (Runner-Up: Centipede)
- Computer: Miner 2049er (Runner-Up: Star Raiders)
- Arcade: Pole Position (Runner-Up: Q*bert)

The games that were top-ranked the most in these 1983 polls were:

- Console: Donkey Kong / Donkey Kong Jr.
- Computer: Star Raiders (Runner-Up: Pac-Man)
- Arcade: Pole Position (Runner-Up: Donkey Kong)

=== 1984 ===
January

- Console: Donkey Kong Jr. (Runner-Up: River Raid)
- Computer: Miner 2049er (Runner-Up: Star Raiders)
- Arcade: Dragon's Lair (Runner-Up: Star Wars)

November

- Console: Pitfall II (Runner-Up: Miner 2049er)
- Computer: Zork I (Runner-Up: Buck Rogers)
- Arcade: Dragon's Lair (Runner-Up: Star Wars)

December

- Computer: Zork I
- Arcade: Spy Hunter (Runner-Up: Track & Field)

The games that were top-ranked the most in these 1984 polls were:

- Console: Donkey Kong Jr. / Pitfall II
- Computer: Zork I (Runner-Up: Miner 2049er)
- Arcade: Dragon's Lair (Runner-Up: Spy Hunter)

=== 1985 ===
January

- Console: Pitfall II (Runner-Up: Q*bert)
- Computer: Miner 2049er (Runner-Up: Donkey Kong)
- Arcade: Star Wars (Runner-Up: Dragon's Lair)

There was no reader poll held for the March 1985 issue.

== Hall of Fame ==
The twelve games voted by readers as part of the magazine's Hall of Fame up until January 1985.

- Pong (1972)
- Space Invaders (1978)
- Asteroids (1979)
- Star Raiders (1980)
- Defender (1980)
- Major League Baseball (1980)
- Pac-Man (1980)
- Donkey Kong (1981)
- Quest for the Rings (1981)
- Miner 2049er (1982)
- Zaxxon (1982)
- Dragon's Lair (1983)
