= Casio PV-7 =

MSX home computer

PV-7
- Developer: Casio Computer
- Type: home computer
- Released: 1984
- Introductory price: 29,800 yen
- Operating system: MSX BASIC 1.0
- CPU: Zilog Z80A @ 3.56 MHz
- Memory: 8 KB
- Removable storage: cartridge
- Display: RF output, CVBS: 256 × 192 pixels, 16 colors
- Graphics: TMS9929A
- Sound: AY-3-8910
- Controller input: Joystick
- Backward compatibility: MSX1

The PV-7 is an MSX-compatible home computer released by Casio Computer on October 15, 1984. At the time the standard MSX computer price was over 50,000 yen, but the PV-7 was released at the low price of 29,800 yen.

Positioned as a successor to the PV-2000 home computer, released by Casio the previous year, it inherited the PV-2000's octagonal "joypad" at the right of the keyboard.

Due to the small amount of RAM installed, many of the software written in BASIC couldn't be run, and the keyboard was barely large enough to input characters. These limitations meant that the machine used mainly for games provided on ROM cartridges.

== History ==
Utilizing the calculator technology that Casio mastered at the time, the PV-7 used a single-sided circuit board to reduce manufacturing costs. The intended release price was 19,800 yen, which would be competitive with the Famicom. Although the actual price exceeded the initial target, it was successful in being priced under 30,000 yen. The emphasis on price led to the sacrifice of specifications, with RAM limited to 8 KB, the minimum capacity allowed by the MSX standard, a single cartridge slot and no tape interface.

Despite its low specs, sales were strong during the Christmas season. However, the price slash caused by the Casio PV-7, caused other MSX machines to plummet in price, leading many electronics manufacturers to withdraw from the standard as it was no longer profitable. Nishi Kazuhiko, a proponent of the MSX standard, states: "Casio's price cuts almost killed off the MSX of other companies. I thought, 'Oh no!'".

== Technical details ==
The PV-7 has 8 KB of RAM, expandable to 64 KB by using a dedicated expansion or RAM expansion cartridge. The CPU is a Z80A running at 3,579 Mhz. Graphics are handled by a TMS9918A graphics chip capable of generating 256×192 pixels graphics with 16 colours and 32 sprites. The machine has 32 KB of ROM housing MSX BASIC v 1.0.

There are two color variations: black with gray keys, and red with black keys.

== Software ==
Software released by Casio for the PV-7:

- GPM-101: Steeplechase
- GPM-102: Hot Battle at Koshien
- GPM-103: Ski Command
- GPM-104: Pachinko UFO
- GPM-112: Ice World
- GPM-113: Eagle Fighter
- GPM-114: Casio World Open
- GPM-117: Iga Ninja Scroll
- GPM-118: Car Fighter
- GPM-119: The 7 Adventures of Sinbad
- GPM-120: Exoid Z
- GPM-123: Monster House
- GPM-124: Kitten's Great Adventure
- GPM-125: Philosopher's Stone
- GPM-128: Iga Ninja Scroll: Battle at Full Moon Castle
- GPM-129: Exoid Z Area 5
- GPM-130: Moai Treasures
- GPM-131: Crest of Hades, the Dragon King of Darkness
- GPM-132: What is the problem with Issun-boshi?
- GPM-501: Game Land
- GPM-501S: Game Land Special
- GPM-502: Introduction to BASIC
- GPM-503: Drawing Contest
- GPM-505: Introduction to BASIC II
- GPM-506: Introduction to Computers

== Related machines ==
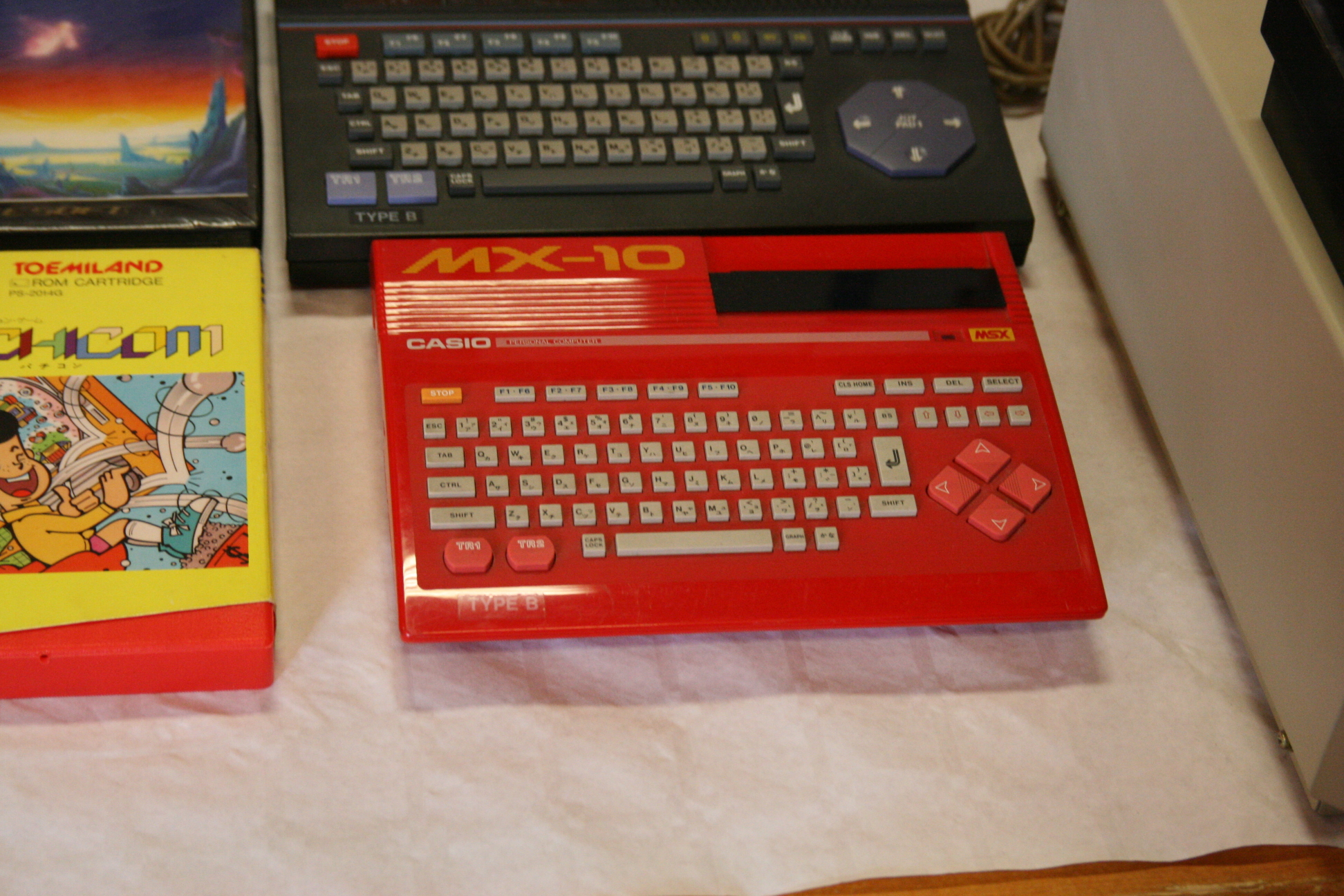
Casio MX10

These models inherited the basic concept of the PV-7 as an inexpensive computer, and all of them were equipped with a joypad.

=== PV-16 ===
Released in 1985, this machine had 16KB of RAM at the same price as the PV-7. It also had a built-in cassette interface. The exterior was the same as the PV-7, but the internal circuit board was double-sided.

=== MX-10 ===
Released in 1986, this machine was even smaller than the PV-16, with a price of 19,800 yen. It had a chiclet keyboard and the cassette interface was optional.

=== MX-101 ===
Released in November 1986, this machine allows the RF output be wirelessly transmitted to a TV using transmitting and receiving antennas.

== See also ==
- PV-1000
- PV-2000
