= Biblia komputerowego gracza =

- Authors: Piotr Gawrysiak, Aleksy Uchański, Piotr Mańkowski
- Language: Polish
- Subject: History of computer games
- Genre: Nonfiction
- Publisher: Wydawnictwo Iskry
- Publication date: October 1998
- Publication place: Poland
- ISBN: 8-320-71606-3
- OCLC: 749500002

Biblia komputerowego gracza (lit. "The computer gamer's Bible") is a book devoted to the history of computer games, published in Poland in 1998 by the Iskry publishing house. It was written over a period of three and a half years by Aleksy "Alex" Uchański, Piotr "Gawron" Gawrysiak and Piotr "Micz" Mańkowski, who were prominent Polish video game journalists at the time. It had its premiere at the Gambleriada computer exposition, held in October 23–25, 1998. It is considered to be the first Polish book about the history of computer games.

== Contents ==
Each chapter of the book is devoted to a different game genre and begins with its short definition. The bulk of each chapter consists of descriptions of individual games, considered by the authors to be the most important examples of the given genre, arranged in chronological order. In addition, the authors occasionally discuss at length a specific trend or sub-genre.

Each chapter also contains a list of the "top ten games of all time" of the genre, as judged by the authors. For example, the list of "top ten shooter games" is as follows: Commando, Defender, River Raid, Green Beret, Ghosts 'n Goblins, Super Zaxxon, Maggotmania (a clone of Centipede), Tapper, (Note: Classified in the book as a "shooter game" due to the nature of its gameplay (launching beer mugs towards customers).) Gyruss and Star Wars: Rebel Assault.

The book includes the following genres: shooter games, platform games, arcade adventure games, fighting games (including beat 'em up games), sports games, racing games, vehicle simulators, adventure games, role-playing games, strategy games (divided into "wargames" and "economic games"), and three-dimensional shooters (including first- and third-person shooters).

According to Piotr Gawrysiak, most of the content was written by Piotr Mańkowski. Gawrysiak, invited to collaborate only towards the end of the work, wrote only the chapter on vehicle simulator games. Years later, Aleksy Uchański claimed that he had bad memories of working on the book and was not satisfied with the sections he had written.

== Reception ==
At the time of publication, Biblia komputerowego gracza attracted attention as the first Polish publication that thoroughly discussed the history of computer games. The reviewer in the Gambler magazine recommended the book to every gamer eager to learn more about his hobby, and the reviewer in the Secret Service magazine admired the wealth of information contained in the book. Michał Zacharzewski, a reviewer at the website Imperium Gier (part of the Wirtualna Polska portal), considered the book "amazing" and rated it as follows: "for people who remember «those» times 9/10, for youngsters 7/10".

However, the book was criticized for having very few illustrations, and for the brief and vague game descriptions; according to the reviewers, these aspects made the book less useful for readers unfamiliar with the presented games. The book was also noted to contain erroneous and incomplete information (for example, many entries for older games include the note "developer unknown"). In addition, reviewers criticized the writing style as humorless and sloppy.
