= Konami 80's Arcade Gallery =

- North American PlayStation cover art
- Developer: Konami
- Publisher: Konami
- Platforms: Arcade, PlayStation
- Release: Arcade; 1998; PlayStation: JP: May 13, 1999; NA: December 9, 1999
- Genre: Arcade
- Modes: Single-player, multiplayer
- Arcade system: Konami System 573

Konami 80's Arcade Gallery (コナミエイティーズアーケードギャラリー, Konami Eitizu Ākēdo Gyararī) is a compilation of arcade video games originally released by Konami for Japanese arcades in 1998. It was planned for release outside Japan as Konami 80's AC Special, though there is no evidence that any export kits ever made it to market.

It was later ported to the PlayStation in 1999, where it was renamed to Konami Arcade Classics for its North American release. It was supposed to be released in September 1999, before the game was delayed to its release date of December 9, 1999. Unlike most of Konami's PlayStation games, the PlayStation version was not released in PAL regions.

While many compilations on home consoles predate Konami Arcade Classics, it is one of the earliest examples of an arcade reissue of classic games, being preceded only by the Namco Classics Collection series. It is also, to date, one of only two arcade compilations with both a coin-op and consumer release (the other being Space Invaders Anniversary).

== Development ==
The collection was developed for the System 573 arcade system - hardware based on the Sony PlayStation architecture.

While the arcade version had an intro movie and also had an attract mode for certain games, the PlayStation version got its own unique intro movie. In addition, the North American PlayStation version got a small history feature, which gave brief blurbs of facts about each of the included games.

== Included games ==
- Pooyan (1982)
- Scramble (1981)
- Yie Ar Kung-Fu (1984)
- Roc'n Rope (1983)
- Shao-lin's Road (originally released in North America as Kicker; 1985)
- Circus Charlie (1984)
- Super Cobra (1981)
- Road Fighter (1984)
- Time Pilot (1982)
- Gyruss (1983)

== Reception ==
Reception

Aggregate score
Aggregator	Score
GameRankings	67%

Review scores
Publication	Score
AllGame	4/5
CNET Gamecenter	7/10
Electronic Gaming Monthly	7.25/10 (Note: In Electronic Gaming Monthly's early review of the PlayStation version, two critics gave it each a score of 7.5/10, and two more gave it 7/10.)
EP Daily	5/10
Game Informer	6.75/10
GameFan	89% (T.R.) 80% 78% (Note: In GameFan's early viewpoint of the PlayStation version, two critics gave it each a score of 73, and the other gave it 88.)
GameSpot	7/10
IGN	4.5/10
Next Generation	3/5
Official U.S. PlayStation Magazine	2.5/5

The PlayStation version received average reviews according to the review aggregation website GameRankings. Many magazines gave the game mixed to positive reviews while it was still in development. Chris Charla of NextGen said of the game in its early review: "They were fun then, they're fun now, and with 10 games included, this package is an excellent deal." GamePro said of the game in its early review: "They may be dusty and obscure, but the collection of games in Konami Arcade Classics offers unique and surprisingly fresh gameplay. Retro still rocks!" (Note: GamePro gave the PlayStation version two 3.5/5 scores for graphics and sound, 3/5 for control, and 4.5/5 for fun factor in its early review.)

== See also ==
- List of Konami games
