= LinYee Yuan =

- Education: Columbia University
- Occupation: Magazine editor
- Known for: Founder of MOLD magazine

LinYee Yuan is a design journalist as well as the editor and founder of MOLD magazine, which examines issues relating to food from a futuristic design perspective. It has readers in Great Britain, France, Germany, Singapore and Taiwan, as well as the United States.

== Early life ==
LinYee Yuan grew up in Houston, Texas as a first generation Chinese American. Her father is an engineer, and her mother is a dietician. She has always had an interest in magazine. In high school, she sneaked out and hang with the librarian of a local community college to read magazines. She named Yolk as the most influential magazine in her teens since it is one of the only few publications that features Asian people on the covers.

== Education ==
In 2002, Yuan graduated with a bachelor's degree in Asian American studies from Columbia University. She is currently based in New York.

== Career ==
In 2011, Yuan worked for Core77, an industrial design website, where she travelled around world to design festivals. She also opened a Texas style brisket restaurant in Brooklyn.

In 2013, Yuan founded website thisismold.com, which publishes journalism on futuristic food and design. In March 2017, Yuan launched a Kickstarter campaign to fund a physical iteration of the website, which would be published biannually under the name MOLD. With a goal of $34,000, more than $37,000 was ultimately raised. In interviews, Yuan has stated that the goal of both site and magazine is to examine how design and innovation can create food solutions for an expanding global population. In 2015, she became interested in food design on a global scale when writing about a project on food crisis by a communication design student in Australia, Gemma Warriner, which showed the UN that if we continue to consume food at the current rate, by 2050, we will not be able to feed 9 billion people.

After 3 years of keeping MOLD an online platform, she transitioned MOLD to a printed format so MOLD could reach their audiences who are mainly designers. She advocates for designers to have a voice in discussing critical issues. In art direction, she collaborated with Eric Hu, Matt Tsang, and Jena Myung.

Yuan was a part time lecturer at Parsons School of Design in Spring 2022. She was on the judging panel of the Discover Design Award in 2014 and Food & Design Award 2018 at the Dutch Institute of Food & Design.

== Awards and honors ==
Yuan was included in the list of Futures 100 Innovators by The Future Laboratory in 2022.

== See also ==
- Bon Appétit (magazine)
- Foodie
- Yolk
- Parsons School of Design
