= Konami Collector's Series: Arcade Advanced =

2002 video game compilation

- North American cover art featuring the logos of the six titles.
- Developer: Konami
- Publishers: Konami (Game Boy Advance); Majesco (TV plug & play); Konami Digital Entertainment (PC plug & play)
- Director: Minoru Toyota
- Artist: Masaki Sugimoto
- Composer: Jun Funahashi
- Platforms: Game Boy Advance, Plug & play
- Release: GBA: NA: March 2002 (Note: Sources disagree on the exact North American release date but put it between March 18, 2002 and March 23, 2002.); JP: May 2, 2002; PAL: June 21, 2002; Plug & play 2004
- Genres: Action, Multicart
- Modes: Single player, multiplayer

Konami Collector's Series: Arcade Advanced, known in Japan as Konami Arcade Game Collection (Note: Japanese: コナミアーケードゲームコレクション, Hepburn: Konami Ākēdo Gēmu Korekushon) and in Europe as Konami Collector's Series: Arcade Classics, is a compilation video game developed and published by Konami in 2002 for the Game Boy Advance. The anthology features enhanced remakes of six of the company's popular arcade games from the 1980s. In addition to updated visuals, the title took advantage of the handheld console's Game Link Cable to provide multiplayer modes for several of the games.

Development lasted six months and was led by Minoru Toyota. Challenges during the process included converting the visuals to a screen size different from the original arcades' hardware and reducing the game's file size enough to implement single-cartridge multiplayer. Plug and play versions were released later in 2004 and 2006.

The compilation received an overall positive response from video game publications. Praise focused on the accurate reproduction of the arcade games, the nostaglia of the tiles, and the added value of the enhanced features. A common criticism was the dated audiovisuals when compared to modern games.

== Overview ==
The compilation allows the player to select a game to play. The interface provides a preview of each title.

Arcade Advanced is a multicart compilation of popular Konami action arcade games from the 1980s. From a selection screen, the player can choose one of six games. The collection comprises Frogger, Scramble, Time Pilot, Gyruss, Yie Ar Kung-Fu, and Rush'n Attack. The games feature new elements, such as enhanced graphics and multiplayer modes via the Game Boy Advance Game Link Cable. The Konami Code can be used to access enhanced aspects of each game. For example, new stages are available in Time Pilot and Gyruss whereas Frogger and Scramble can be played with improved visuals.

Frogger is a 1981 action video game developed by Konami for arcades. The game tasks the player with navigating a frog safely across a busy road and river with dangerous obstacles. Frogger includes a timed competitive two player mode that can be played with either one or two cartridges. Scramble is a horizontally scrolling shooter game also released in 1981. The enhanced version allows the player to select the type of ship to fly. Time Pilot is a 1982 multidirectional shooter game where the player must defeat enemies in aerial combat with a futuristic fighter jet. Set across different time periods, the enemies match their respective eras. The game also includes a multiplayer mode where two players compete to obtain the highest score.

Gyruss is a tube shooter released in 1983 and created by the designer of Time Pilot. It includes a new hidden Black Hole level accessed by the Konami Code. Yie Ar Kung-Fu is a 1984 fighting game in which the player must defeat a roster of fighters through a series of martial arts matches. The new multiplayer mode pits two players against each other. Rush'n Attack, known as Green Beret outside North America, is a 1985 action game that features run and gun combat. The player must infiltrate a Soviet military base to rescue hostages while defeating an army of enemies. Its multiplayer mode allows two players to cooperatively play the game together.

== Development ==
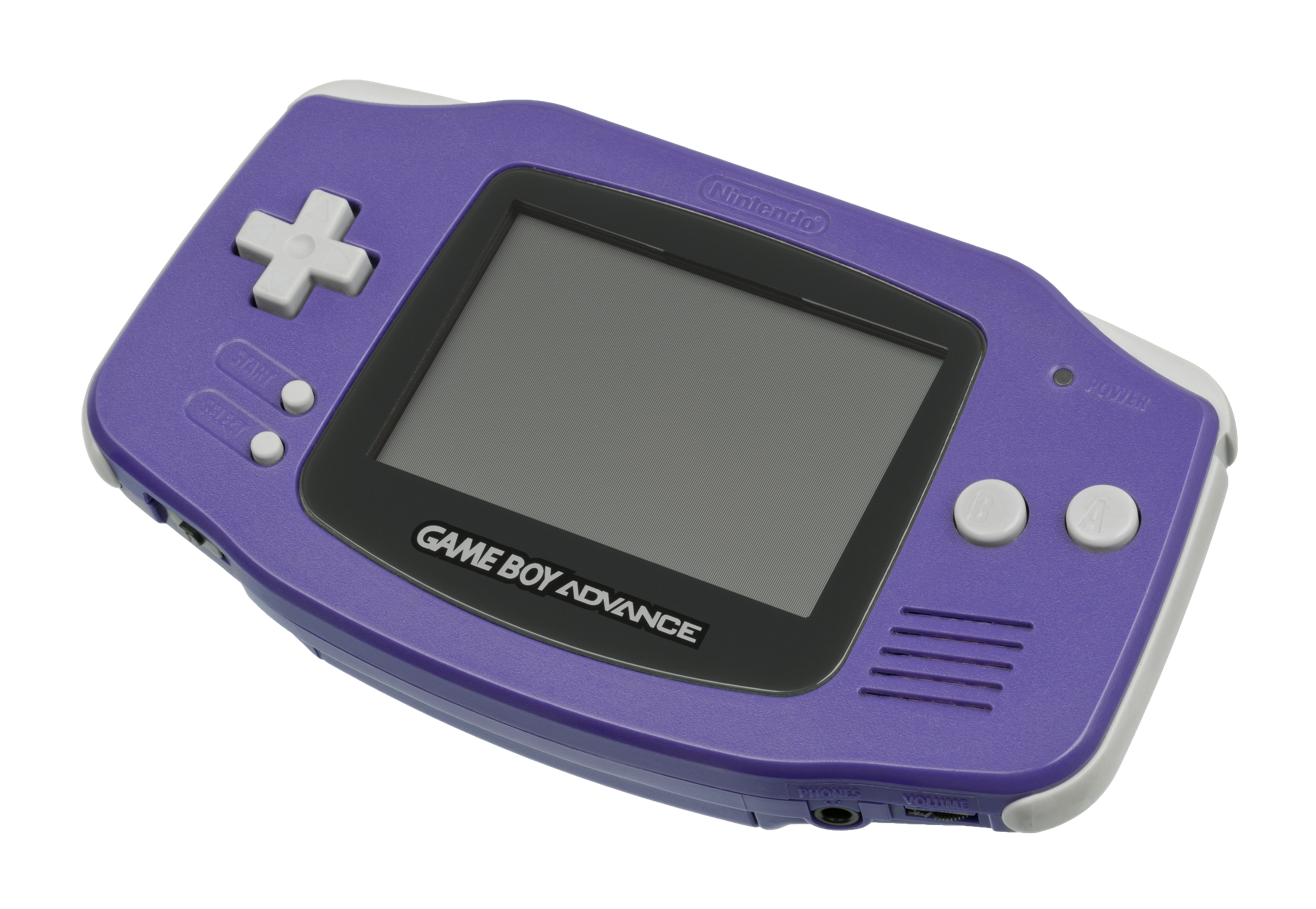
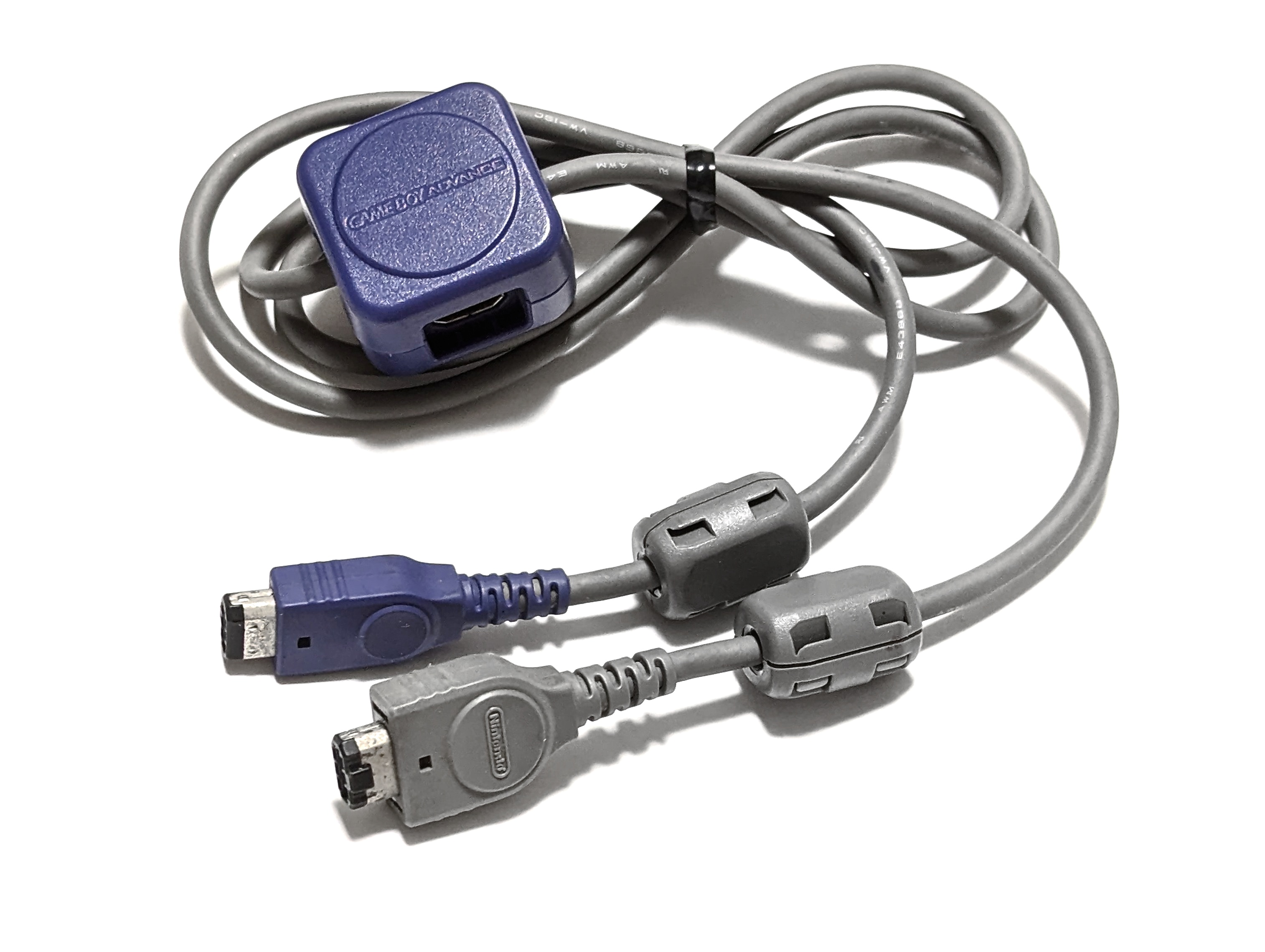
Konami developed the collection exclusively for the Game Boy Advance (top), which allowed for single-cartridge multiplayer gameplay via the Game Link Cable (bottom).

Arcade Advanced was developed and published by Konami. A team of four programmers, led by director Minoru Toyota, spent six months creating the game. Three of the programmers were each instructed to focus on the single player mode of two specific games. Jimi Ishihara programmed Frogger and Yie Ar Kung Fu. Yuji Yoshiie was assigned Scramble and Gyruss while David Mantzel worked on Time Pilot and Rush'n Attack. Masaki Sugimoto served as the lead artist with several individual artists assigned to certain games. The audio manager was Jun Funahashi. Toyota developed the overall system and the multiplayer modes.

When selecting titles to include, the team considered the popularity of Konami's titles in terms of notability and enjoyment. While they wanted to include more games, they selected six for the collection. Rather than emulate the original arcade hardware, the team re-coded the games for the Game Boy Advance, which required adjustments to account for the screen size difference between arcade monitors and the handheld console. Character sprites also required adjustments; the developers made such changes to Scramble and Rush'n Attack until development concluded. Additionally, the developers updated music in Frogger to attract new players in anticipation of future developments in the series. (Note: Between 2000 and 2003, Konami released two Frogger games a year as part of a revival for the series.) While the team referenced Nintendo's sample program for multiplayer, they created their own system tailored to the collection's titles. Toyota considered developing the multiplayer component very challenging, specifically keeping the ROM file size small enough to implement single-cartridge multiplayer. Large adjustments were made to Yie Ar Kung Fu and Rush'n Attack in order to reduce their respective file sizes. Single-cartridge multiplayer, also called "multiboot", requires that the transferred data fit within the handheld console's internal RAM, which can store 256KB.

The compilation, along with screenshots and an April 2002 release date, was announced at the end of 2001. Konami announced that the game shipped early in North America near the end of March 2002. Arcade Advanced was released on a 32 megabit Game Boy Advance Game Pak. The company promoted the game at its booth in the South Hall of the Los Angeles Convention Center at the Electronic Entertainment Expo in May 2002. The next month, the game was released in the European region. Majesco released a plug and play version in 2004. Two years later, Konami Digital Entertainment released a Konami Live! plug and play computer controller that features four of the Arcade Advanced titles emulated online.

== Reception ==
Reception

Aggregate score
Aggregator	Score
Metacritic	78/100

Review scores
Publication	Score
GameSpot	8.5/10
IGN	9/10
Jeuxvideo	3/20
Yolk	3/5

Konami Collector's Series: Arcade Advanced received "generally favorable" reviews, according to review aggregator Metacritic. Prior to release, Game Boy Xtreme magazine staff wrote that more attention had been put to creating the compilation than other retro collections. While they felt the title wouldn't be a huge success, they considered it a decent deal. IGN's Craig Harris remarked on the conversion's accuracy when previewing the game.

Writing for GameSpot, Jeff Gerstmann praised the faithful reproduction of the original arcade games but chided the audiovisuals as "drab" by contemporary standards. He lauded the selection of the games and considered the single-cartridge multiplayer options an added value. Gerstmann drew attention to the upgrades to Yie Ar Kung-Fu, commenting that they elevate it to a "full-fledged fighting game" that alone makes the collection worth owning. Harris lamented the lack of options and customization from the original arcade machines but praised the "near perfect" reproduction as well as the extra features. He summarized his review lauding Konami's effort in expanding the original experiences with enjoyable additions and called on other developers to follow the company's example. Harris considered Arcade Advanced the most thorough compilation on the system due to the extra features, specifically citing the multiplayer capabilities. Reviewing the collection for Yolk magazine, Renan Balanga called the games "classics" and describe it as an opportunity to relive memories or experience retro gaming. Nintendo Power staff included the game as a nominee for the "Best Remake" of 2002 category for readers to vote.

The reception in European media was more mixed. A reviewer for German magazine Club Nintendo praised the European release, calling it a bargain. They recommended the anthology to players that like fast-paced games but commented that nostalgic fans would enjoy it more. While they acknowledged the titles were not on par with contemporary games, the reviewer felt the collection was entertaining nonetheless. Jeuxvideo staff was more critical, stating that the nostalgia did not compensate for the poor and dated audiovisuals. While they called the gameplay intuitive, the reviewer wrote that the games are uninteresting and most will forget about Arcade Advanced.

Commentators have praised the compilation retrospectively as well. Harris considered it among the fifteen best games for the Game Boy Advance in 2003. He called Arcade Advanced one of the best compilations of classic arcade games, citing the "near-perfect renditions" and the features unique to these conversions of the titles. While highlighting the single-cartridge multiplayer capability of the system in 2004, Harris remarked about the technical challenge to using the feature and commended Konami for going "all out" with the feature's support in Arcade Advanced. In 2006, IGN's Mark Bozon considered the title one of the hidden gems of Game Boy Advance.

== See also ==
- List of Konami games
