= Vanguard II (video game) =

1984 video game

- Arcade flyer
- Developer: SNK
- Publisher: SNK
- Platform: Arcade
- Release: WW: March 1984
- Genre: Multidirectional shooter
- Mode: Up to 2 players alternating turns

Vanguard II (Japanese: ヴァンガードII) is a multidirectional shooter video game developed and published by SNK released in arcades in 1984. It is the sequel to the 1981 game Vanguard. It was not as successful as the original.

== Gameplay ==
Gameplay screenshot

Unlike the forced scrolling format of the first game, Vanguard II takes place in top-down multi-directional scrolling stages. The ship can move in eight directions as it flies over a floating alien platform with the goal of destroying the power pods providing the station with energy. Aerial defenses must be shot down, while pods on the platform must be bombed with the aid of a crosshair. Once the players have destroyed enough pods they can bomb the core, which destroys the platform and ends the level.

== Reception ==
In Japan, it was ranked number 22 on the Game Machine table arcade cabinet chart in May 1984.

== Legacy ==
Vanguard II was included in the SNK Arcade Classics 0 compilation for the PlayStation Portable, which was released in Japan in 2011.

== See also ==
- Time Pilot '84
