= Vanguard (video game) =

1981 video game

- Japanese arcade flyer
- Developer: Tose
- Publishers: Arcade: JP/EU: SNK; NA: Centuri; ITA: Zaccaria; 2600, 5200; Atari, Inc.
- Programmer: Dave Payne (2600)
- Platforms: Arcade, Atari 2600, Atari 5200
- Release: Arcade: JP: July 1981; NA: October 1981; EU: 1981; 2600: NA: December 1982; 5200: NA: October 1983
- Genre: Scrolling shooter
- Mode: Single-player

Vanguard (Note: Japanese: ヴァンガード, Hepburn: Vangādo) is a 1981 scrolling shooter video game developed by Tose and published by SNK. It was released in Japan and Europe in July 1981, and licensed to Centuri for manufacture in North America in October and to Zaccaria in Italy that same year. Cinematronics converted the game to cocktail arcade cabinets in North America. It is the second game to be developed by Tose, who was not credited for being outsourced under SNK, after Sasuke vs. Commander.

Vanguard is one of the first shooters with forced scrolling, following Scramble and Super Cobra from earlier in 1981 and released the same month as Cosmic Avenger. Like Sega's Space Odyssey, also from 1981, there are both horizontally and vertically scrolling sections; Vanguard adds portions with diagonal scrolling. The player flies a ship through tunnels to reach a boss at the end. The ship is controlled with an 8-way joystick. Four buttons in a diamond arrangement allow shooting in four directions independent of the ship's movement.

Atari, Inc. released a port for their Atari 2600 console in 1982 and the Atari 5200 in 1983. Vanguard II, an arcade sequel with top-down, multidirectional scrolling, and gameplay similar to Time Pilot '84, remained obscure.

== Plot ==
The Gond has been terrorizing nearby space colonies with its periodic raids of destruction. The time has come to put an end to his reign of terror. The player has been selected to pilot an advanced fighter ship with high offensive capabilities, and must enter the cave inside the asteroid where the Gond makes his home, and safely fly through every zone; the Mountain Zone, Rainbow Zone, Styx Zone, Stripe Zone, Bleak Zone, and the City of Mystery (aka Last Zone) where the Gond is rumored to reside. The player must take the Gond out, and succeed in the mission. If unsuccessful, the colonies will be doomed.

== Gameplay ==
Vanguard on Atari 2600

Vanguard is similar to Scramble, in that the player controls a ship which automatically flies forward through scrolling levels. It has a limited amount of fuel that constantly depletes. Unlike Scramble, fuel is replenished by destroying enemies, so running out of fuel is less common. Some portions of Vanguard scroll vertically, horizontally, or diagonally.

The ship can fire lasers independently in the four cardinal directions via four buttons. Flying into an energy pod makes the ship invulnerable for a short while, allowing both enemy ships and the tunnel walls to be destroyed by ramming.

The game is divided into two tunnels of multiple zones each. The first tunnel consists of Mountain Zone, Rainbow Zone, Styx Zone, Rainbow Zone 2, Stripe Zone, Rainbow Zone 3, Bleak Zone, and the City of Mystery/Last Zone. The second tunnel consists of Mountain Zone, Stripe Zone, Styx Zone, Rainbow Zone, Bleak Zone, and the City of Mystery/Last Zone. At the end of each tunnel the player must defeat a boss guarded by two moving force fields with holes in them.

Custom sound chips produce digitized voice and synthesized sounds. The voice announces the name of the current zone, the next zone that is about to be entered, and "Be careful" when a power-up is about to end. Theme music composed by Jerry Goldsmith for the 1979 film Star Trek: The Motion Picture, later used in Star Trek: The Next Generation, is borrowed as Vanguard's introductory theme. Vultan's theme (composed by Queen's Freddie Mercury) from the 1980 film Flash Gordon is used as the music when a power-up is active.

== Ports ==
Atari, Inc. released ports of Vanguard for the Atari 2600 in 1982 and the Atari 5200 in 1983. The Atari 2600 version was programmed by Dave Payne.

== Reception ==
Vanguard was the top-grossing video game on the US Play Meter arcade charts in December 1981. The Atari 2600 version of Vanguard was the 21st best-selling Atari cartridge of all time.

The Atari 2600 version of Vanguard was reviewed by Video magazine in its "Arcade Alley" column where it was described as "a marvelous home-arcade translation" of the original arcade version. Reviewers commented that in contrast to some of Atari's other less-successful efforts with licensed titles, the "anonymous Atari designer made elegant simplifications in the graphics" that faithfully evoke the look and "the same breathtaking action" of the original. Note was also made of the fact that this version of Vanguard marked the first time a continued play option was offered in a game cartridge.

The Atari 5200 version was rated B+ by Raymond Dimetrosky of Video Games Player magazine, stating that it is "a lot of fun" but has worse controls than the Atari VCS version. The 5200 version was awarded the "1984 Best Science Fiction/Fantasy Videogame" at the 5th annual Arkie Awards, where judges described it as "a scrolling shootout extravaganza" and praised its "outstanding graphics". Computer Games magazine reviewed the Atari versions, praising the Atari computer and VCS versions for "great shooting action" while stating the 5200 version "looks good but plays bad".

== Legacy ==
Vanguard was followed by a less successful arcade sequel in 1984, Vanguard II, which has top-down gameplay similar to that of Time Pilot '84. Game Machine listed the sequel on their May 1, 1984 issue as being the twenty-second most-successful table arcade unit of the month.

NXIVM cult leader Keith Raniere, who enjoyed playing this game, used "Vanguard" as his title within the organization.

== See also ==
- Scramble
- Cosmic Avenger
- Super Cobra
