= Pootan =

Pootan may refer to:

- A character from Japanese manga and anime series Cromartie High School
- An unauthorised bootleg version of Japanese arcade game Pooyan
