= Circus Charlie =

1984 video game

- North American arcade flyer
- Developer: Konami
- Publishers: JP: Konami; NA: Centuri
- Platforms: Arcade, Commodore 64, MSX, Famicom
- Release: NA: March 1984; JP: April 1984
- Genre: Action
- Modes: Single-player, multiplayer

Circus Charlie (Note: Japanese: サーカスチャーリー, Hepburn: Sākasu Chārī) is a 1984 action video game developed and published by Konami for arcades. It was released in North America by Centuri in March 1984 and in Japan in April 1984. The player controls a circus clown named Charlie in six different circus-themed minigames. It was released for MSX in the same year, followed by ports to the Famicom in 1986 by Soft Pro and the Commodore 64 in 1987.

== Gameplay ==
Stage 2 Gameplay (Famicom)

In the game, there are six stages of differing tasks that have to be completed by Charlie. Grabbing money bags, performing dangerous tricks, avoiding enemies, completing stages, etc., earn the player points. After the sixth stage is completed, the game starts over again, with faster and harder versions of the exact same stages.

Charlie also races against time. Bonus points are awarded according to the time remaining, but running out of time will cost the player a life.

The game loops until the player loses all their lives.

=== Stages ===
The standard arcade version has six stages in total. Stages 1, 2, 4 and 5 have five substages. Stage 3 contains seven substages. Each substage gets more difficult. Stage 6 also has five substages, but repeats as long as the player has lives.

- Stage 1: Riding on a lion and jumping through flaming rings.
- Stage 2: Tightrope walking whilst jumping over monkeys.
- Stage 3: Jumping between trampolines (while being careful with knife throwers and fire breathers). In substages 3 and 6, the trampolines are placed in a swimming pool, and the knife throwers and fire breathers are replaced by jumping dolphins.
- Stage 4: Jumping from ball to ball.
- Stage 5: Riding a horse and jumping over trampolines and walls.
- Stage 6: Swinging from one trapeze to the next.

=== Versions ===
In arcades, some versions allow the player to freely choose any stage to play.

The Famicom version and the MSX port both lack the trampoline stage. The former features two difficulty modes: Game A (normal) and Game B (high).

The soundtrack was "Trombonanza" in the arcade version, and "American Patrol" in the Famicom version.

== Reception ==
In Japan, Game Machine listed Circus Charlie in their May 15, 1984 issue as the third most successful table arcade unit of the month.

The game was considered challenging.

Personal Computer Games described the game as "cute" and "very playable". The MSX version was praised by MSX User for its graphics, sound and attention to detail. They also called it "entertaining".

A 2020 article on Destructoid, by Chris Moyse, highlighted the game's varied gameplay, smooth animations and vibrant graphics. He also acknowledged the game was "obviously a little dated" at the time.

== Legacy ==
In Mikie, another Konami arcade game, headbutting the teacher's desk from below three times in the classroom stage will make Circus Charlie appear, giving the player extra points.

Circus Charlie was included on the compilation Konami 80's Arcade Gallery (known as Konami Arcade Classics in North America), both for an arcade re-release and for the Sony PlayStation. It was also released along with other Konami classic games on the Nintendo DS compilation Konami Classics Series: Arcade Hits.

The MSX version was released for the Wii U's Virtual Console on June 24, 2015, in Japan. Hamster Corporation released the game as part of their Arcade Archives series for the Nintendo Switch and PlayStation 4 in August 2020.

=== Other media ===
- Circus Charlie is referenced in a manga titled Susume!! Seigaku Dennou Kenkyuubu, published in the Gamest Comics collection in April 1999, drawn by Kouta Hirano. During a discussion about cosplay, Terakado proposes dressing as Circus Charlie and jumping through a flaming ring.
