= Margaret Rhee =

American poet

- Citizenship: United States
- Occupations: Poet; Artist

Academic background
- Education: University of Southern California
- Alma mater: University of California, Berkeley

Academic work
- Discipline: Poet
- Sub-discipline: New media
- Main interests: Participatory action research Pedagogy

Margaret Rhee is a feminist experimental poet, new media artist, and scholar. Her research focuses on technology, and intersections with feminist, queer, and ethnic studies. She has a special interest on digital participatory action research and pedagogy.

== Education ==
Rhee holds a Ph.D. from the University of California Berkeley in ethnic studies with a designated emphasis in new media studies. She received her B.A. in English and creative writing from the University of Southern California.

== Poetry ==
Rhee's chapbook Yellow was published in 2011 by Tinfish Press/University of Hawaii. In 2016, she published Radio Heart; or, How Robots Fall Out of Love with Finishing Line Press. In 2017, her poetry collection Love, Robot was published by The Operating System.

She serves as managing editor of Mixed Blood, a literary journal on race and experimental poetry published out of the University of California, Berkeley. She co-edited the collections Here is a Pen: An Anthology of West Coast Kundiman Poets (Achiote Press) and online anthology Glitter Tongue: queer and trans love poems. Her poetry has been published at the Berkeley Poetry Review, Lantern Review: A Journal of Asian American Poetry, and Mission At Tenth.

== Research and teaching ==
Her scholarship has been published at Amerasia Journal, Information Society, and Sexuality Research and Social Policy. As a digital activist and new media artist, she is co-lead and conceptualist of "From the Center", a feminist HIV/AIDS digital storytelling education project implemented in the San Francisco Jail. For this project, she was awarded the Chancellor’s Award in Public Service from UC Berkeley and the Yamashita Prize Honorable Mention for young activists by the Center for Social Change. She currently serves on the board of directors for social justice organizations, DataCenter and the Queer Women of Color Media Arts Project.

She was the Institute of American Cultures Visiting Researcher in Asian American Studies at UCLA from 2014 to 2015. From 2004 to 2006, she worked as an editor for publications YOLK Magazine, Chopblock.com, and Backstage.

She was a college fellow at Harvard University in the department of English, and assistant professor at SUNY Buffalo in the department of media study. She is an assistant professor of media studies at the New School, in New York, NY.
