= Cosmic Avenger =

1981 video game

- Arcade flyer
- Developers: Universal; Nuvatec (ColecoVision)
- Publishers: Arcade; Universal; ColecoVision; Coleco (NA); CBS Electronics (EU)
- Series: Cosmic
- Platforms: Arcade, ColecoVision
- Release: Arcade: WW: July 1981; ColecoVision: NA: August 1982; EU: 1983
- Genre: Scrolling shooter
- Modes: Single-player, multiplayer
- Arcade system: 8106

Cosmic Avenger (Note: Japanese: コズミック アベンジャー, Hepburn: Kozumikku Abenjā) is a horizontally-scrolling shooter developed by Universal and released as an arcade video game in July 1981. It is part of the first-wave shooters with forced horizontal scrolling which followed Konami's Scramble and Super Cobra from earlier in the year. It was released the same month as Vanguard. The final installment in Universal's Cosmic series, players take control of the Avenger space fighter and, as in Scramble, use bullets and bombs against enemy air and ground forces. The world is one continuous level made up of different areas.

The game was ported to ColecoVision as one of its August 1982 launch titles in North America. The ColecoVision version was more successful than the arcade original, garnering mostly positive reception from critics who praised the action, visuals, and sound effects. Ports to the Atari 2600 and Intellivision were in development and advertised, but not released.

== Gameplay ==
The player's ship (left of the searchlight beam) flies over the plaid terrain of the first section.

Players take control of the Avenger fighter craft, guiding it across horizontally-scrolling terrain and dodging obstacles. The main objective is earning points by destroying alien forces. The game is divided into three sections, each with its own terrain and obstacles. There is no intermission between sections; the game scrolls into the new terrain seamlessly. The game can be played by one or two players, alternating turns as each player's ship is destroyed.

A joystick moves the ship in four directions, and buttons fire lasers and bombs to destroy spaceships, anti-aircraft missiles, tanks, and UFOs. A radar display at the top of the screen shows incoming enemies. The ship does not require a constantly depleting fuel supply to be replenished, which allows players to focus solely on the enemies. The enemies have specific behavior patterns and can crash into each other. As the game progresses, enemies act more aggressively and fire at a faster rate. An "X station" occasionally appears on the ground; if hit, it destroys all enemies visible on the screen.

If the player's ship is hit by enemy fire, crashes against the terrain, enemies or any explosion radius, a life is lost and they will be respawned into the nearest checkpoint reached. Once all lives are lost, the game is over, although players can insert coins to continue playing without having to restart from the beginning.

== Release ==
ColecoVision reception

Review scores
Publication	Score
AllGame	2/5
Arcade Express	9/10
TeleMatch	3/6
Tilt	5/6

Cosmic Avenger was first released in arcades by Universal in July 1981 as one of the first games with forced horizontal scrolling in the wake of Scramble and Super Cobra by Konami and following the May 1981 release of Sega's horizontally and vertically scrolling Space Odyssey. The game runs on Universal's 8106 arcade board.

The ColecoVision port from Nuvatec was one of the console's North American launch titles in August 1982, with a European release in 1983. Coleco announced and advertised versions of Cosmic Avenger for both the Atari 2600 and Intellivision, but neither was released for unknown reasons. The original arcade release of Cosmic Avenger did not become a hit, but found success and a larger audience as one of the launch titles for ColecoVision, like some of the lesser known arcade games that gained popularity on the console such as Universal's Lady Bug.

In 2014, Cosmic Avenger was included in the ColecoVision Flashback compilation released by AtGames.

== Reception ==
The ColecoVision version of Cosmic Avenger was reviewed in Video magazine in its "Arcade Alley" column where it was described as "great fun" and as a game that "packs more than enough excitement in its three screens to satisfy any lover of arcade-style action games". Although reviewers noted that the game is "not as free-ranging as [those] in which the ship can scroll left as well as right", it was praised for its "beautiful graphics", and it was suggested that Cosmic Avenger might herald the coming of a "scrolling shootout" trend in home video games. In September 1982, Arcade Express reviewed the ColecoVision version and scored it 9 out of 10. Creative Computing Video & Arcade Games said in 1983 that "although Cosmic Avenger was not terribly popular in the arcades, Coleco's adaptation will do well in the home market" and a "nice addition" to the console's library.

== Reviews ==
- Games
