= The Other Day I Met a Bear =

Camp song

Song
- Genre: Camp song
- Composer: Carey Morgan
- Lyricist: Lee David

"The Other Day I Met a Bear" (also known as "The Bear in the Forest" or "Bear in Tennis Shoes") is a traditional American camp song, sung as an echo song. It uses the same tune that is also used for "Princess Pat" and "Sippin' Cider Through a Straw." Its Roud Folk Song Index number is 37851.

== Lyrics ==
The traditional lyrics are:

This is a Repeat After Me song!

The other day (The other day)
I met a bear (I met a bear)
Out in the woods (Out in the woods)
Oh way out there (Oh way out there)

The other day, I met a bear
Out in the woods, Oh way out there

He looked at me (He looked at me)
I looked at him (I looked at him)
He sized up me (He sized up me)
I sized up him (I sized up him)

He looked at me, I looked at him
He sized up me, I sized up him

He said to me (He said to me)
Why don't you run? (Why don't you run?)
I see you ain't (I see you ain't)
Got any gun (Got any gun)

He said to me why don't you run?
I see you ain't got any gun

I said to him (I said to him)
That's a good idea (That's a good idea)
So come on feet (So come on feet)
Away from here (Away from here)

I said to him, that’s a good idea
So come on feet away from here

And so I ran (And so I ran)
Away from there (Away from there)
But right behind (But right behind)
Me was that bear (Me was that bear)

And so I ran away from there
But right behind me was that bear

And then I see (And then I see)
Ahead of me (Ahead of me)
A great big tree (A great big tree)
Oh, glory be! (Oh, glory be!)

And then I see ahead of me
A great big tree Oh, glory be!

The lowest branch (The lowest branch)
Was ten feet up (Was ten feet up)
I'd have to jump (I'd have to jump)
And trust my luck! (And trust my luck!)

The lowest branch was ten feet up
I'd have to jump and trust my luck!

And so I jumped (And so I jumped)
Into the air (Into the air)
But I missed that branch (But I missed that branch)
A way up there (A way up there)

And so I jumped into the air
But I missed that branch a way up there

Now don't you fret (Now don't you fret)
Now don't you frown (Now don't you frown)
'Cause I caught that branch ('Cause I caught that branch)
On the way back down (On the way back down)

Now don't you fret, now don't you frown
'Cause I caught that branch on the way back down

This is the end (This is the end)
There ain't no more (There ain't no more)
Until I meet (Until I meet)
That bear once more (That bear once more)

This is the end, there ain't no more
Until I meet that bear once more

Some versions include a verse before the last stanza:

I heard a crack, And then a crunch. And then I was That big bears lunch!

Some versions also include the following lines after the last stanza:

And so I met
That bear once more,
Now he’s a rug
On my bedroom floor.

The "Bear in Tennis Shoes" version starts with the following lines:

The other day,
I met a bear,
In tennis shoes,
A dandy pair.

This version ends with:

The moral of,
This story is,
Don't talk to bears,
In tennis shoes.

Another version is:

I met a bear
a great big bear
I met a bear
a way up there

I looked at him
He looked at me
I sized up him
He sized up me

He said to me
Why don't you run?
'cause I can see
you've got no gun

And so I ran
away from there
and right behind
me was that bear

I saw a tree
a great big tree
I saw a tree
Oh, lucky me.

The nearest branch
was ten feet up
I'd have to jump
and chance to luck

And so I jumped
into the air
and missed that branch
up in the air

Now don't you fret
now don't you frown
I caught that branch
on the way down

Final verse, which may be used if singing a bit more of the song over several nights, adding more each time.

That's not the end
now don't get sore
another night
we'll tell you more

Additional verses, extending the story with more animals:

Then I got scared
at what I saw
'cause that ole bear
got a chainsaw

He cut my tree
he cut it down
he cut my tree
down to the ground

And so I jumped
into the lake
and lost the bear
but found a snake

The snake saw me
and I saw him
and then I sank
'cause I can't swim

Down, down I sank
into the lake
and right behind
me was that snake

Then he turned back
with fangs and all
what scared him was
the waterfall

One hundred feet
is pretty tall
but a sharp rock
it broke my fall

Then I crawled out
into the swamp
and I stood up
when I heard "CHOMP."

That's not the end
now don't get sore
another night
we'll tell you more

(break here until next time)

When I looked down,
what did I see?
A crocodile
had hold of me.

And then I thought
"This can't get worse."
Then it got worse
than the last verse.

The crocodile
called seven more
and with my legs
played tug-a-war.

Out to the sea
the crocs dragged me
out to the sea
unlucky me

Then they turned back
Oh, happy day...
a great white shark
scared them away

The shark rushed in
its jaws were wide
I saw its teeth
and deep inside

That's not the end
now don't get sore
another night
we'll tell you more

(break here until next time)

And then I thought
"Now I am dead."
When I woke up
safe in my bed

I was at camp
safe as could be
my counselor
was calling me

Come on, wake up
You sleepy head
It's time to rise
Get out of bed

Let's have some fun
You won't guess where
We'll take a hike
a way up there.

== Other uses ==
"The Other Day I Met a Bear" is one of the songs sung by Barney the dinosaur on the 1990 children's video Campfire Sing-along except it was shortened to 4 stanzas instead of 10. On Barney & Friends, the tune was used for The Exercise Song. The 2007 album For the Kids Three! includes a version of the song by Barenaked Ladies.

In Japanese, the song is known as "Mori no Kuma-san" (森のくまさん or 森の熊さん), with lyrics written by Yoshihiro Baba. Baba's lyrics differ significantly from the American version, with a twist ending that the bear was chasing the narrator to return a lost earring. It is on the soundtrack to the film version of Ranma ½ (1989) and an instrumental version is used in Pooyan and frequently in the Family Stadium video game series.
