= Naughty Boy (video game) =

1982 video game

- North American arcade flyer
- Developer: Jaleco
- Publishers: JP: Jaleco; NA: Cinematronics
- Platforms: Arcade, PV-1000
- Release: JP: March 1982; NA: May 1982
- Genre: Maze
- Modes: Single-player, multiplayer

Naughty Boy (Note: Japanese: ノーティボーイ, Hepburn: Nōti Bōi) is a 1982 maze video game developed and published by Jaleco for arcades. It was released in Japan in March 1982 and in North America by Cinematronics in May 1982. It was Jaleco's first video game to be developed in-house, after publishing various games by other developers. The game was ported to the Casio PV-1000 home console in 1983.

Hamster Corporation released the game as part of their Arcade Archives series for the Nintendo Switch and PlayStation 4 in June 2020.

== Gameplay ==
The player controls a prepubescent boy who travels across various settings to burn down castles inhabited by monsters. He is armed with stones to defeat monsters in the way as well as destroying obstacles. The levels' primary objective is to defeat flaming ghosts on top of the castle, which will set the castle on fire. Bonus levels allow players to gain points by throwing various objects to stun an indestructible monster.
