= Nitro Racers =

Unreleased video game

- Developer: Torc Interactive
- Publisher: Studio 3DO
- Programmers: Brian O'Shaughnessy, Steve Cottam
- Artist: Karl D'Costa
- Composer: Equilibrium
- Platform: MS-DOS
- Release: 2022-10-07
- Genre: Racing

Nitro Racers is a video game developed by the Derry-based game studio Torc Interactive and published in Europe by Studio 3DO for the PC. The game was set for release in June 1997, but no contemporary release happened. A demo for the game appeared on Gambler CD #9. In October 2022, the game was released on GOG.com and Steam by Ziggurat interactive.

== Gameplay ==
Nitro Racers is a top-down perspective racing game. The game has three difficulties and three viewing modes. It allows for up to three human players, as well as network play over IPX.

== Reception ==
Next Generation reviewed the game, rating it four stars out of five, and stated: "With its nearly flawless control, multiplayer options, and track editor, Nitro Racers would be one worth picking up – if 3DO releases it over here."
