= Asian pride =

Celebration of Asian ethnicity and culture

Asian pride is a term that encourages celebration of Asian ethnicity and culture, with various interpretations and origins. In international relations, it can involve advancing Pan-Asianism and critiquing the West. In the United States, it has roots in counter culture, rejecting stereotypes and empowering Asian Americans. The term gained modern use through hip hop culture, promoting a positive stance on being Asian American. The phrase "Got Rice?" emerged as a symbol of cultural identity and pride, often tied to Asian Pride. It humorously references rice as a staple food in Asian cultures. The term was adopted in T-shirt campaigns and seen as a way for Asian Americans to define their identity and counter stereotypes.

== International usage ==
Asian pride is a broad term that can cover several topics. Within the international relations context, Asian pride can be seen within Asian politics as advancement of Pan-Asianism through heavy criticism of the West.

While 'Asian pride' is a term often associated with international relations and the advancement of Pan-Asianism, its significance resonates within the Asian American community as well. This concept serves as a bridge between the experiences of Asian immigrants and Asian Americans in the United States. It reflects the shared journey of individuals who have migrated to the U.S. from diverse Asian countries and their descendants, who have grappled with questions of identity, belonging, and cultural pride.

For many Asian Americans, the notion of 'Asian pride' represents a source of empowerment and cultural celebration. It emerges as a response to historical discrimination, stereotypes, and a sense of 'otherness' that many Asian Americans have faced in the United States. By embracing 'Asian pride,' individuals within the Asian American community reclaim their cultural heritage and assert their unique identities.

== United States ==
The pan-ethnicity Asian American concept is not embraced by many Asian Americans in the United States.

=== Yellow Power ===
In the United States the term has older roots within the counter culture movement among Asian Americans in the 1960s. During the period there was the Black Power movement, and Asian Americans seeing the impact it had on African-American culture and overall society, rejecting being called "Oriental" and the stereotype of the "yellow peril" used the term Asian Pride, along with "yellow power", to advance empowerment of Asian Americans.

=== Hip Hop culture ===
A more modern usage of the term "Asian Pride" (also spelled AZN pride) in the United States is a positive stance to being Asian American. The term arose from influences of hip hop culture within Asian American communities in the Western United States due to the creation of an Asian American pan-ethnicity (the concept was influenced in the late 20th century due to the influence of publications such as Yolk and Giant Robot magazines) that did not specify a specific ethnicity (such as Vietnamese, or Hmong). One manifestation of this was the Got Rice? term, which spun off from the advertising campaign Got Milk?. Younger Asian Americans are finding strength from their Asian identity. Another usage of the term was Greg Pak's Asian Pride Porn!, which used politically correct pornography parody to present Asian Americans in a positive light compared to their portrayal in late 20th century mainstream media. Sometimes this arises due to being made to feel different from the prevalent culture surrounding the Asian American youth.

The term is often used with a negative connotation to describe individuals who prefer only to have Asian American relationships, a stance supported by the majority of Asian Americans, with the exclusion of potential diverse relationships. It has also been criticized as being primarily a marketing gimmick that "is wide open to model minority accusations." and allows for racial name calling.

The term has been adopted by a few Filipino American gang members in Los Angeles, who used the term to assist them in their construction of their ethnic identity. It has also been used as the name of a gang in Florida and Colorado.

=== Got Rice? ===
The phrase "Got Rice?" is a term and an image artwork that was coined by Asian American youth, Jonny Ngo, in the 1990s shortly after the original "Got Milk?" advertising campaign for the California Milk Board in 1993. The phrase has since come to be used as a symbol for the cohesiveness of Asian American cultural identity and cultural pride, especially on the Internet. It's usually mentioned close to the Asian Pride slogan.

The humor is derived from the fact that rice is a staple food in many Asian cultures. The slogan can thus be viewed as an Asian American cultural response to American media and advertising.

There is also a parody song called "Got Rice?", often referred as AZN Pride, which samples 2Pac's "Changes". The song dates back to at least 2000, and has been described as being in the raptivist genre; it is also noted as an example of Asian Americans, specifically Chinese Americans, adoption and adaption of Hip Hop culture. It has also been referred to as "satirically pro-Asian", for its use of the AZN terminology which is not fully embraced by all Asian Americans. The Fung Brothers released a modification of the song in 2010.

==== T-shirt campaign ====
While the phrase itself presumably began as Asian American slang, the first notable usage is the T-shirt campaign first started by the Asian American magazine Yolk.

Soon, other Asian American organizations began promoting the phrase and selling similar T-shirt designs. The organizations and their proponents intended for the T-shirts to be a fun way of promoting Asian American cultural heritage:

"Political identi-tees don’t all have to be so in-your-face. The Japanese American National Museum in L.A.’s Little Tokyo offers an array of kinder, gentler tees commemorating aspects of Japanese-American heritage both fun and serious. Among the most popular designs, a line of adult and baby tees feature the rallying cry of the lactose liberation movement, "Got Rice?"

Many in the Asian American community viewed the design as evidence of significant progress for the viability of Asian American culture and identity; whereas before identity may have been enforced on Asians via stereotypes from the dominant society, the "Got Rice?" shirts were an attempt by Asian Americans to define their identity and to take back those symbols used to stereotype them.

== See also ==
- AZN Television
- Black pride
- Ethnic nationalism
- Pan-Asianism
- Nationalism
