= Scramble (video game) =

1981 video game

- North American arcade flyer
- Developer: Konami
- Publishers: Arcade: JP: Konami/Leijac; NA: Stern Electronics; Ports: NA: GCE; EU: Compu-Games A/S; EU: Milton Bradley
- Platforms: Arcade, Vectrex, Tomy Tutor, Tomytronic
- Release: March 17, 1981: Arcade; NA: March 17, 1981; JP: March 1981; EU: 1981 Vectrex; October 1982 Tomy Tutor; JP: 1983; NA: 1983
- Genre: Scrolling shooter
- Modes: Single-player, multiplayer
- Arcade system: Konami Scramble

Scramble (Note: Japanese: スクランブル, Hepburn: Sukuranburu) is a 1981 horizontally scrolling shooter video game developed and published by Konami for arcades. It was distributed by Leijac for manufacture in Japan and Stern in North America. It was the first side-scrolling shooter with forced scrolling and multiple distinct levels, and it established the foundation for a new genre.

It was Konami's first major worldwide hit. In the United States, it sold 15,136 arcade cabinets within five months and became Stern's second best-selling game. Scramble was not ported to any major contemporary consoles or computers, but there were releases for the Tomy Tutor and Vectrex as well as dedicated tabletop/handheld versions. Unauthorized clones for the VIC-20 and Commodore 64 use the same name as the original.

Scramble's sequel, the more difficult Super Cobra, was released only five months later, in August 1981. Gradius (1985) was originally intended to be a follow-up to Scramble.

== Gameplay ==
The player controls a futuristic aircraft, referred to in the game as a jet, and has to guide it across scrolling terrain, battling obstacles along the way. The jet is armed with a forward-firing weapon and bombs; each weapon has its own button. The player must avoid colliding with the terrain and other enemies while simultaneously maintaining its limited fuel supply, which diminishes over time. More fuel can be acquired by destroying fuel tanks in the game.

The game is divided into six sections, each with a different style of terrain and various obstacles. There is no intermission between each section; the game seamlessly scrolls into the new terrain. Points are awarded based on the duration of survival, as well as for destroying enemies and fuel tanks. In the final section, the player must destroy a "base". Once this objective is achieved, a flag indicating a completed mission is displayed at the bottom right of the screen. The game then repeats, returning to the first section with a slight increase in difficulty, via faster fuel depletion.

=== Scoring ===
- Per second the jet is in play: 10 points
- Rockets: 50 points on ground, 80 in air
- UFO ships: 100 points
- Fuel tanks: 150 points
- Mystery targets: 100, 200, or 300 points
- Base at ends of levels: 800 points

The player is awarded an extra jet for scoring 10,000 points, and none more thereafter. Running out of fuel or colliding with any object or terrain destroys the jet. Once the final jet is lost, the game is over.

== Development and release ==
The United States Court of Appeal states the following regarding the game's development and release:

In January 1981 at a London trade exhibit Stern became aware of Scramble, an electronic video game developed in late 1980 by a Japanese corporation, Konami Industry Co., Ltd. The audiovisual display constituting what Stern alleges is the copyrightable work was first published in Japan on January 8, 1981. Stern secured an exclusive sub-license to distribute the Scramble game in North and South America from Konami's exclusive licensee, and began selling the game in the United States on March 17, 1981.

=== Handheld versions ===
A dedicated Tomytronic version of Scramble was released in 1982. A second electronic tabletop version of Scramble was released the same year in the UK by Grandstand under licence from Japanese firm Epoch Co., who sold the game in Japan under the title Astro Command. Gameplay differs from the arcade version as no scenery is rendered and the ship has no need to refuel. A handheld compact LCD version known as "Pocket Scramble" was released the following year. Scramble was also made available on the 2002 Game Boy Advance cartridge Konami Collector Series Arcade Advanced. This version is a close port of the original game in the arcade cabinet.

== Reception ==
Scramble was commercially successful and critically acclaimed. In its February 1982 issue, Computer and Video Games magazine said it "was the first arcade game to send you on a mission and quickly earned a big following". In the United States, the game sold 10,000 arcade cabinets worth $20,000,000 (equivalent to $71,000,000 in 2025) in sales within two months of release in 1981, and it topped the US monthly RePlay arcade charts in June 1981. It sold 15,136 arcade cabinets in the United States within five months, by August 4, 1981, becoming Stern's second best-selling game after Berzerk. Its sequel, the more difficult Super Cobra, sold 12,337 cabinets in the U.S. in four months that same year, adding up to 27,473 U.S. cabinet sales for both, by October 1981. In Japan, Scramble was tied with Jump Bug and Space Panic as the 14th highest-grossing arcade video game of 1981.

The Vectrex version was reviewed in Video magazine where it was praised for its fidelity to the original arcade game and was described as the favorite among Vectrex titles they had reviewed. The game's overlays were singled out, with reviewers commenting that "when you're really involved with a Vectrex game like Scramble, it's almost possible to forget that the program is in black-and-white". David H. Ahl of Creative Computing Video & Arcade Games reported in 1983 that no test player was able to get past the fourth level of the Vectrex version.

In 1982, Arcade Express gave the Tomytronic version of the game a score of 9 out of 10, describing it as an "engrossing" game that "rates as one of the year's best so far".

Scramble made the list of Top 100 arcade games in the Guinness World Records Gamer's Edition. In 1996, GamesMaster ranked the arcade version 60th in their "Top 100 Games of All Time" list.

== Legacy ==
According to the intro of Gradius Galaxies and the Gradius Breakdown DVD included with Gradius V, Scramble is considered the first in the Gradius series, but the Gradius Collection guidebook issued a few years after by Konami, lists Scramble as part of their shooting history, and the Gradius games are now listed separately.

An updated version of Scramble is available in Konami Collector's Series: Arcade Advanced by inputting the Konami Code in the game's title screen. This version allows three different ships to be chosen: the Renegade, the Shori, and the Gunslinger. The only difference between the ships besides their appearance are the shots they fire. The Renegade's shots are the same as in the original Scramble, the Shori has rapid-fire capabilities triggered by holding down the fire button, and the Gunslinger's shots can pierce through enemies, meaning they can be used for multiple hits with a single shot.

=== Impact ===
In an interview with RePlay magazine in January 1990, Konami founder Kagemasa Kōzuki (Kaz Kozuki) stated that he considers Scramble to be Konami's most important game. He said that Scramble was the company's first major hit that launched Konami into world prominence. The game also served as a foundation for the horizontally scrolling shooter sub-genre. While not the first horizontally scrolling shooter (it was predated by Defender two months earlier), Wayne Santos of GameAxis Unwired notes that Scramble and its sequel Super Cobra "created the side-scrolling shooter that progressed to the end of a level, rather than having a self-enclosed level that warped on itself in an infinite loop, like Defender".

Konami's Gradius (1985), the first title in the Gradius series, was originally intended to be a follow-up to Scramble, with the working title Scramble 2. It reused many of its materials and game mechanics. Game designer Scott Rogers named Scramble as well as Irem's Moon Patrol (1982) as forerunners of the endless runner platform genre.

=== In other media ===
Scramble gameplay is featured during the opening credits of the 1982 Spanish film Colegas by Eloy de la Iglesia, along with some other arcade games of the era like Defender, Monaco GP and Missile Command.

=== Re-releases ===
- Xbox Live Arcade library for the Xbox 360 on September 13, 2006.
- Microsoft's Game Room service for the Xbox 360 and Windows on March 24, 2010.
- 1999 for the PlayStation as part of Konami Arcade Classics.
- 2002 for the Game Boy Advance on the compilation Konami Collector's Series: Arcade Advanced.
- 2005 for the PlayStation 2 in Japan as part of the Oretachi Geasen Zoku Sono series.
- 2007 for the Nintendo DS as part of Konami Classics Series: Arcade Hits.
- PlayStation 4 as part of the Arcade Archives series in Japan in 2014, North America and Asia in 2015, and for the Nintendo Switch in 2019.
- PlayStation 4, Nintendo Switch, Xbox One, and Windows on Steam on April 18, 2019 as part of the Arcade Classics Anniversary Collection.

=== Clones ===
Atari 8-bit computer games Airstrike (1982), Bellum (1983), and Mars Mission II are Scramble clones. Skramble (1983) is a clone for the Commodore 64. Whirlybird Run (1983) is a TRS-80 Color Computer clone.

=== Legal history ===
In Stern Electronics, Inc. v. Kaufman, 669 F.2d 852, the Second Circuit held that Stern could copyright the images and sounds in the game, not just the source code that produced them, in response to a nearly identical "knock-off" arcade game marketed by Omni Video Games.

== See also ==
- Cosmic Avenger (1981)
- Vanguard (1981)
