= Casio Loopy =

Home video game console manufactured by Casio

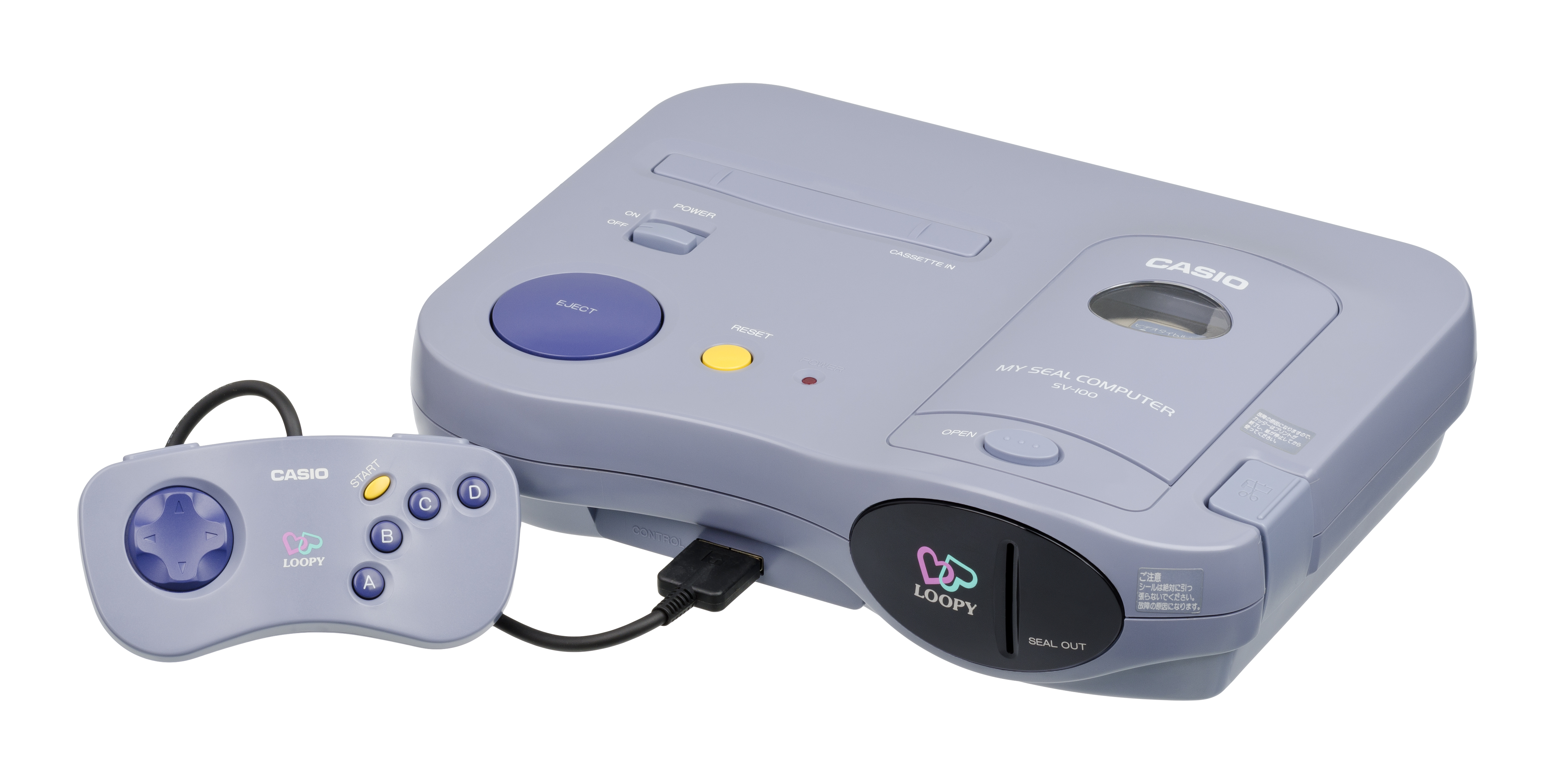
- Also known as: My Seal Computer SV-100
- Manufacturer: Casio
- Type: Home video game console
- Generation: Fifth
- Lifespan: JP: October 19, 1995 – December 1998
- Introductory price: 25,000¥ (around 28,300¥ in 2024)
- Media: ROM cartridge
- CPU: SH7021 32-bit SuperH
- Memory: 1MB RAM
- Storage: 2MB ROM
- Display: NTSC-M composite video out
- Graphics: 512 colors
- Sound: 4 channels, 12-bit PCM
- Controller input: D-pad and mouse
- Predecessor: PV-1000

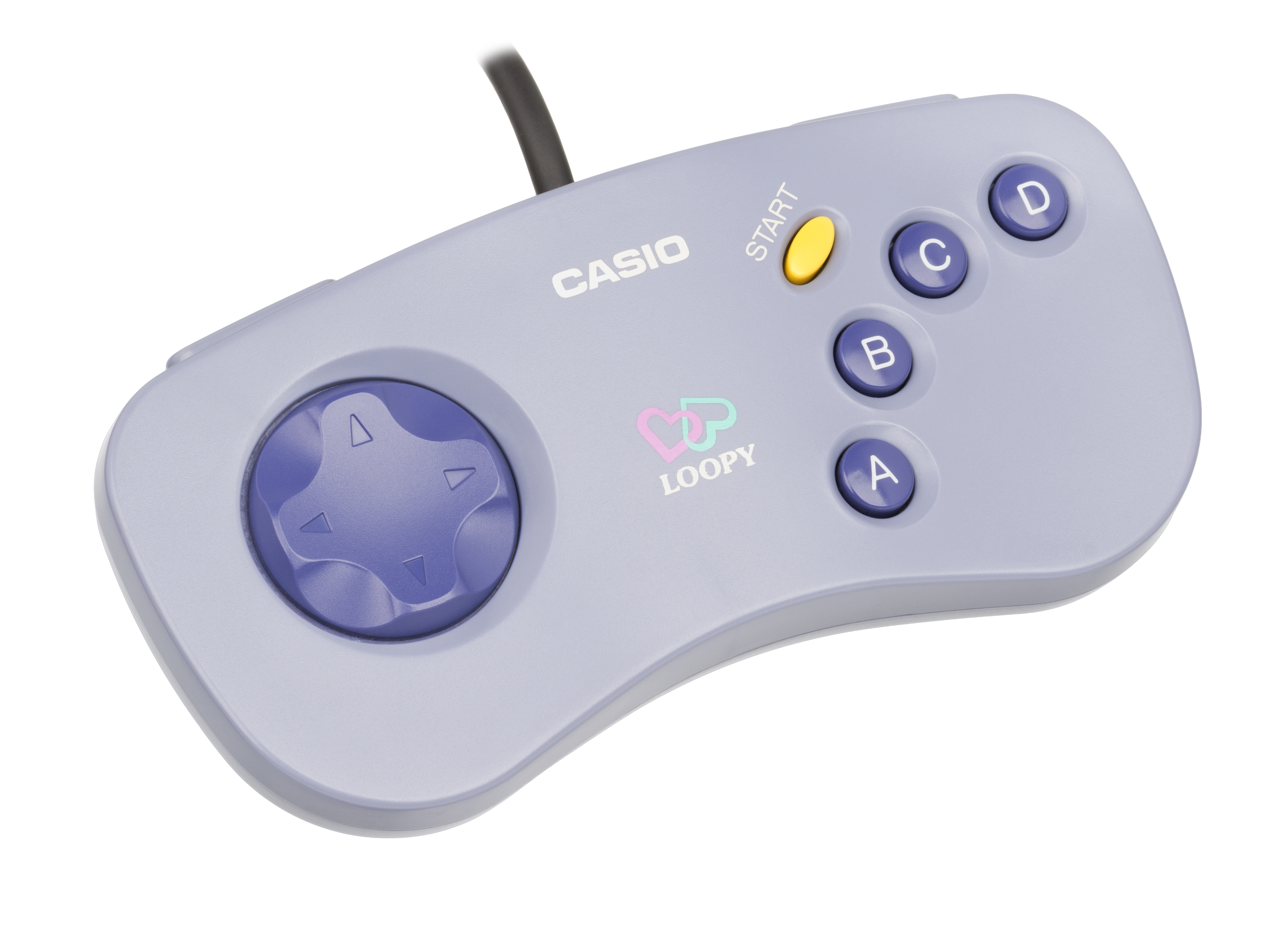
Casio Loopy Gamepad

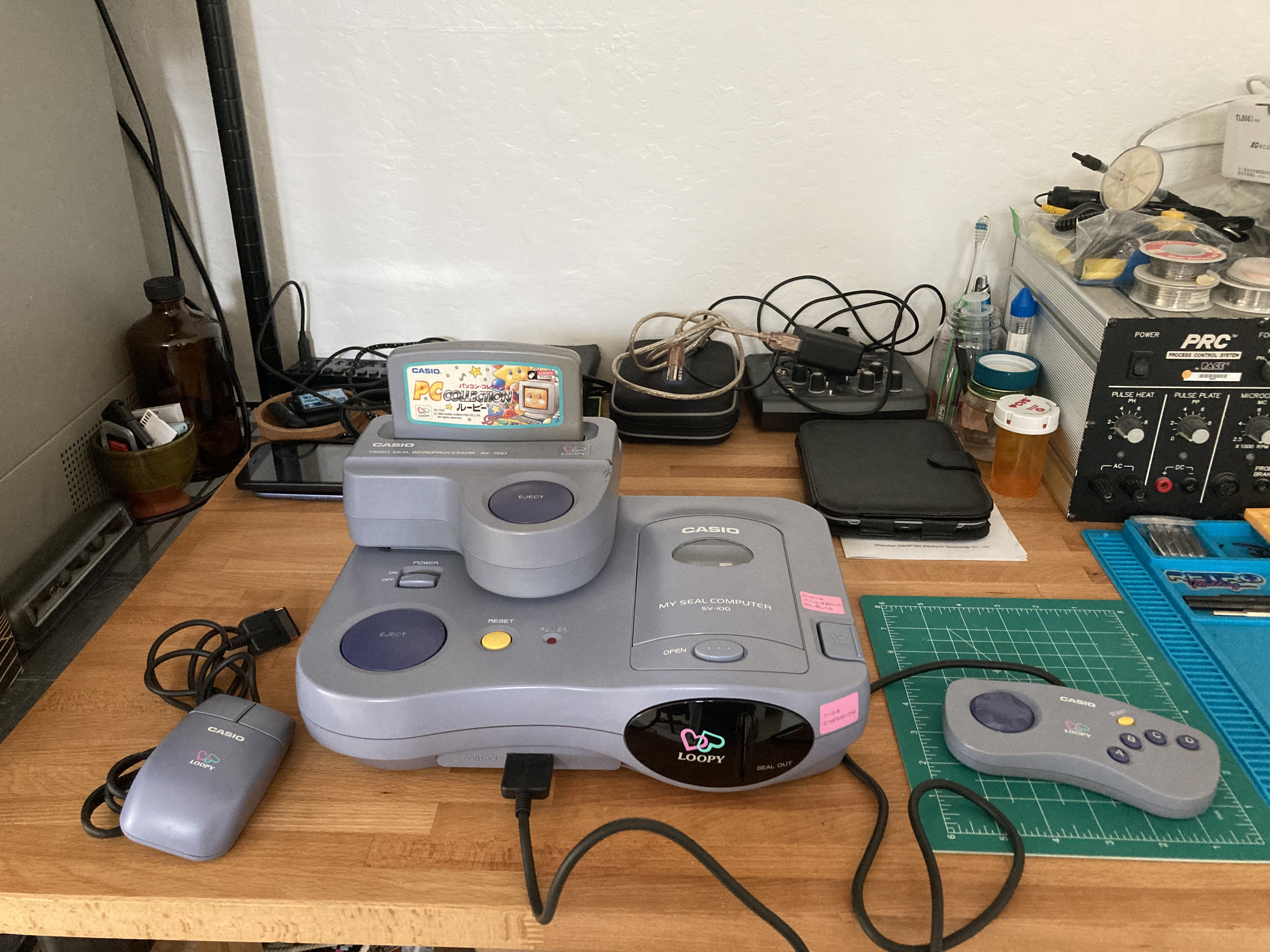
Casio Loopy with Magical Shop accessory

The Loopy (Japanese: ルーピー, Hepburn: Rūpī), subtitled My Seal Computer SV-100, is a 32-bit home video game console. Released exclusively in Japan in October 1995 with a price of 25,000¥, the marketing for it was completely targeted to girls and women.

The console is powered by a Hitachi SH7021 SuperH 32-bit RISC CPU running at 16MHz, and had 1MB of RAM and 2MB of ROM. It was capable of displaying 512-color graphics and of playing 4 channels of 12-bit PCM audio.

The Loopy has one controller port for use with a standard game controller or with a mouse which was sold separately.

The Loopy includes a built-in thermal color printer that could be used to create stickers from game screenshots. An optional accessory, called Magical Shop (マジカルショップ, Majikaru Shoppu), was a video capture device to obtain images from VCRs and DVD players. Users may add text to these images and make stickers. Including Magical Shop's own built-in software, the Loopy library contained 11 titles.

Developer Kenji Terada worked on I Want a Room in Loopy Town! (ルーピータウンのおへやがほしい!, Rūpī Taun no O-heya ga Hoshii!).

Software development ended in November 1996, and Casio ceased production of the console in December 1998.

== Games ==
Eleven titles were released for the system.

1. Anime Land (あにめらんど, Animerando)
2. Bow-wow Puppy Love Story (わんわん愛情物語, Wanwan Aijō Monogatari)
3. Dream Change: Kokin-chan's Fashion Party (ドリームチェンジ 小金ちゃんのファッションパーティー, Dorīmuchenji Kokinchanno Fasshonpātī)
4. HARIHARI Seal Paradise (HARIHARIシールパラダイス, HARIHARI Shīru Paradaisu)
5. I Want a Room in Loopy Town! (ルーピータウンのおへやがほしい!, Rūpī Taun no O-heya ga Hoshii!)
6. Little Romance (リトルロマンス, Ritoru Romansu)
7. Lupiton's Wonder Palette (ルピトンのワンダーパレット, Rupiton no Wandāparetto)
8. Chakra-kun's Charm Paradise (チャクラくんのおまじないパラダイス, Chakurakun no Omajinai Paradaisu)
9. Caricature Artist (似顔絵アーティスト, Nigaoe Ātisuto)
10. PC Collection (パソコン・コレクション, Pasokon Korekushon)
11. Magical Shop (マジカルショップ, Majikaru Shoppu)

The games PC Collection and Lupiton's Wonder Palette were both packaged either as stand-alone or bundled with the mouse.
