= Drol =

1983 video game

- Publishers: Broderbund; Sega (SG-1000)
- Designer: Benny Aik Beng Ngo
- Platforms: Amiga, Apple II, Atari 8-bit, Commodore 64, PC-88, SG-1000
- Release: 1983: Apple, Atari, C64; 1985: SG-1000; 1991: Amiga
- Genre: Action
- Mode: Single-player

Drol is a video game published by Broderbund in 1983. It was written for the Apple II by Benny Aik Beng Ngo, then ported to the Commodore 64 and Atari 8-bit computers. Versions were released for the SG-1000 in 1985 and Amiga in 1991.

== Gameplay ==
C64 title screen

The player controls a robot walking or flying through a four story maze, attempting to rescue people and animals while avoiding traps and enemies such as alien creatures, snakes, eagles, magnets, arrows and axes. There are only three levels, but the game repeatedly starts over in a more difficult version if the third level is completed. In the third level of some versions, in order to reach the final floor without being eaten by a plant sprouting from out of nowhere, the player must choose between three different trapdoors, and the correct trapdoor varies from game to game.

== Reception ==
When reviewing three new games in February 1984, ANALOG Computing said that Drol was "by far the best thought-out", with "refreshing sound effects and some of the best pseudo-3D graphics I've ever seen", reminding the reviewer of a scene from The Ninth Configuration. Run, reviewing the Commodore 64 version in May 1984, gave it an "A"—its highest rating—and described it as "fun, funny, and exciting", although the magazine criticized the slow loading times. InfoWorld's Essential Guide to Atari Computers cited it as among the best Broderbund arcade games. Ahoy! called Drol "an amusing little game." Electronic Fun with Computers & Games gave it 4 out of 4. Reviewer Marc Berman wrote:

Once in a while a home game comes along that has hit written all over it. Often it's from an arcade hit or a spinoff of another game. But occasionally it's a totally original idea. Games like that are as rare as honest politicians. Drol is one and I heartily endorse it.

David Stone reviewed the game for Computer Gaming World, and stated that "the high quality of the animation, the cleverness of the animated foes, and the nonsense of the theme, all make Drol well-worth the money."

In 1984, Softline readers named Drol the seventh most-popular Apple program of 1983.
