= Gyruss =

1983 video game

- European arcade flyer
- Developer: Konami
- Publishers: Konami: Arcade; JP: Konami; NA: Centuri 2600, 5200, Atari 8-bit, ColecoVision, C64 Parker Brothers NES Ultra Games
- Designer: Yoshiki Okamoto
- Programmers: Toshio Arima; Hideki Ooyama
- Artist: Yoshiki Okamoto
- Composer: Masahiro Inoue: Famicom Disk System, NES Atsushi Fujio Yuichi Sakakura Harumi Ueko
- Platforms: Arcade, Atari 2600, Atari 5200, Atari 8-bit, ColecoVision, Commodore 64, NES, Famicom Disk System, mobile phone, PlayStation
- Release: March 1983: Arcade; NA: March 1983; JP: June 1983 2600, 5200, Atari 8-bit, ColecoVision, C64; NA: June 1984 Famicom Disk System; JP: November 18, 1988 NES; NA: February 1989 Mobile; JP: 2004
- Genre: Tube shooter
- Modes: Single-player, multiplayer

Gyruss (ジャイラス, Jairasu) is a 1983 tube shooter video game developed and published by Konami for Japanese arcades. It was initially licensed to Centuri in North America for dedicated machines before Konami released their own self-distributed conversion kits for the game. Parker Brothers released ports for the Atari 2600, Atari 5200, Atari 8-bit computers, ColecoVision and Commodore 64 in 1984. An enhanced version for the Famicom Disk System was released in 1988, followed by the Nintendo Entertainment System in 1989.

The gameplay is similar to that of Galaga, albeit in a tube shooter format, with the player's ship able to move around the perimeter of an implicit circle. Stars come into view at the center of the screen and fly outward, giving the impression of the player's ship moving through space. Gyruss is the second and last game Yoshiki Okamoto designed for Konami, after Time Pilot. Due to pay disputes, he was fired after the release of this game, and he soon joined Capcom, where he designed 1942 and produced Street Fighter II.

== Gameplay ==
Commodore 64 version

The graphics are displayed using one-point perspective, with the vanishing point in the center of the screen. The player's ship is restricted to a circumference around the edge of the screen and may move in either direction along this path. All shots from the player converge at the vanishing point.

The majority of enemies are spaceships, which must be destroyed to complete a level. They appear either from the center of the screen or from one of the edges, and move in swirling patterns. They can shoot the player's ship or destroy it by contact. They hover near the center of the screen after completing their deployment pattern, and occasionally fly outwards and shoot at the player. If not destroyed by the player, the enemy ships gradually fly away one by one.

There are also several other types of enemies: satellites, asteroids, and laser beam generators. These appear intermittently and soon disappear of their own accord if not destroyed by the player.

Satellites materialize in a group of three just in front of the player after the ordinary enemy ships have finished deployment. They gyrate in small circles and shoot at the player. If the player has the basic weapon when the satellites appear the middle one will be a sun-like object. If destroyed, the player's ship gets a better weapon. If the better weapon has already been gained then all satellites are identical.

Asteroids fly straight outwards from the center of the screen at regular intervals. They cannot be destroyed, but a small points bonus is given for shooting at them.

Laser beam generators occasionally fly straight outwards from the center of the screen. They consist of two generator segments with a laser beam between them; destroying either generator deactivates the beam. The player's ship is destroyed by contact with either the generators or the beam.

The player begins the game "2 WARPS TO NEPTUNE". After completing each level, the player is one warp closer to a planet. Each time a planet is reached, the player's ship is seen flying towards it and then a short bonus round is played, where the player can shoot enemy ships for bonus points without worrying about being destroyed by them. Each enemy destroyed in the bonus stage scores 100 or 10,000 for all 40. After reaching Neptune, the player is then three warps from Uranus, and progresses through Saturn, Jupiter, Mars, and finally Earth, taking three warps to reach each planet, then repeats thereafter. At stage 1 and every 10th stage thereafter, the enemies do not fire on the player when entering the screen.

After completing Earth's bonus stage, the player must travel through the fast "3 WARPS TO NEPTUNE" level before they can return to the start of the game.

Extra lives will be given at certain point thresholds, varying from one machine to another, but when the player's score is higher than 999,990 points, they can no longer obtain score-based extra lives.

== Music ==
The game's background music is an uptempo electronic arrangement of Johann Sebastian Bach's Toccata and Fugue in D minor, BWV 565; this particular track is similar to "Toccata", a rock arrangement by the UK-based group Sky. Gyruss uses stereo sound, which according to the bonus material for Konami Arcade Classics, was achieved by utilizing discrete audio circuits.

The audio system consists of five 3-voice General Instrument AY-3-8910A sound chips.

== Ports ==
Parker Brothers released ports for the Atari 2600, Atari 5200, Atari 8-bit computers, ColecoVision, and Commodore 64 in June 1984. A version for the ZX Spectrum was coded but never released.

Gyruss was remade for the Famicom Disk System in Japan, and later the Nintendo Entertainment System in North America, released by Konami's subsidiary Ultra Games. These versions include several major revisions:

1. The player can use a super phaser attack in addition to the normal guns, which cost energy.
2. There are additional enemies, including boss fights when the player reaches each planet.
3. Bonus stages after each planet's boss is defeated, for a chance to gain additional powerups.
4. There is a definite ending to the game. In the NES version, it's a brief text about the Universe being at peace. In the FDS version, there is a full ending sequence with credits.
5. In addition to the satellites providing the usual double guns and bonus points, they can also provide extra phasers, a smart bomb, and even an extra life.
6. Instead of the arcade's 24 stages, there are 39, including Pluto (between Neptune and Uranus), Venus, Mercury, and the Sun.
7. The player can enter the Konami code at the title screen for extra lives, but it must be entered in reverse (A-B-A-B-right-left-right-left-down-down-up-up).

In 1998, the game was included as part of the compilation Konami 80's Arcade Gallery (which was later ported to the PlayStation as Konami Arcade Classics in 1999). In 2002, it was again ported to the Game Boy Advance as part of the Konami Collector's Series: Arcade Advanced compilation.

== Reception ==
In Japan, Game Machine listed Gyruss as the seventh most successful table arcade unit of June 1983. Computer Games magazine gave the ColecoVision and home computer conversions an A− rating in 1985, calling it a "very good adaptation of the Galaga-in-the-round arcade game". Computer Entertainer reviewed the NES version in 1989, scoring it 7 out of 8 stars.

== Legacy ==
The GBA port, in Konami Collector's Series: Arcade Advanced

The Famicom version of the game is included in the Majesco TV Game Konami Collector's Series: Arcade Advanced and was released for Japanese mobile phones in 2004.

Gyruss is included in the compilation Konami 80's Arcade Gallery, released for both the arcade and PlayStation (known as Konami 80's AC Special in western arcades and Konami Arcade Classics in the North American PlayStation version). It is also part of Konami Collector's Series: Arcade Advanced for the Game Boy Advance.

The Konami Live! Plug and Play PC controller includes an emulated online Gyruss, as well as five other Konami titles.

Dance Dance Revolution Ultramix 2 contains a remix of the Gyruss music as a playable song.

=== Clones ===
A bootleg arcade version exists with the name Venus.

Gyruss was cloned as a mini-game in the games Grand Theft Auto: San Andreas (named "They Crawled from Uranus") and Contra: Legacy of War.

=== Record ===
The film Cannon Arm And the Arcade Quest directed by Mads Hedegaard follows the current world record holder Kim "Kanonarm" Köbke and friends in Kim's attempt to set a new world record. Kim "Kanonarm" Köbke sets the record of 70,736,950 during a game of 62 hours and 23 minutes in the summer of 2019.
