= Super Cobra =

1981 video game

- North American arcade flyer
- Developer: Konami (Note: Ports developed by Entex and Parker Brothers.)
- Publishers: JP: Konami/Sega; NA: Stern Electronics; (Note: Ports published by Entex and Parker Brothers.)
- Platform: Arcade: Adventure Vision, Atari 2600, Atari 5200, Atari 8-bit, ColecoVision, Intellivision, MSX, Odyssey², Sord M5, PV-1000
- Release: August 1981: Arcade; JP/NA: August 1981 M5; JP: 1981 Adventure Vision; NA: 1982 Odyssey²; FRA: 1982 2600; September 1983 Atari 8-bit; 1983 Intellivision; 1983 MSX; JP/EU: 1983 ColecoVision; March 1984 5200; May 1984
- Genre: Scrolling shooter
- Modes: Single-player, multiplayer
- Arcade system: Konami Scramble

Super Cobra (Note: Japanese: スーパーコブラ, Hepburn: Sūpā Kobura) is a 1981 horizontally scrolling shooter video game developed and published by Konami for arcades. It was released in North America by Stern. It is a spiritual successor to Scramble, using the same arcade hardware.

The game was a commercial success, selling 12,337 arcade cabinets in the United States within four months, becoming Stern's third best-selling arcade game. Super Cobra was widely ported by Parker Brothers, and there are Adventure Vision and standalone versions from Entex.

== Gameplay ==
Gameplay screenshot

The player controls a helicopter through tight caverns. A laser and bombs can be used to destroy defenders, tanks, and UFOs while infiltrating 10 Super Cobra defense systems. The ship has a limited fuel supply, which is depleted over time. More fuel can be acquired by destroying fuel tanks. The player navigates through ten levels and a base, where they must safely make it through the level and extract loot.

== Ports ==
The game was ported to the Atari 2600, Atari 5200, ColecoVision, Intellivision, Odyssey², and Atari 8-bit computers by Parker Brothers. It was also released for Sord M5, MSX, Entex Adventure Vision and Casio PV-1000. Entex produced a standalone tabletop version.

== Reception ==
Reception

Review scores
Publication	Score
Arcade Express	9/10 (Adventure Vision)
Computer Entertainer	7/8 (ColecoVision)

Award
Publication	Award
Arkie Awards (1983)	Best Action Videogame (Certificate of Merit)

The game was a commercial success. Stern produced 12,337 arcade cabinets for the US market by October 2, 1981, becoming Stern's third best-selling arcade classic after Berzerk and Scramble.

Arcade Express in November 1982 gave the Adventure Vision port a score of 9 out of 10. They concluded that it "takes real skill to master, and represents the state-of-the-art of scrolling shoot-outs".

Creative Computing in January 1984 said that the Atari 8-bit version of "Super Cobra is much more challenging and has better graphics" than other side scrollers and would "please any shoot-'em-up fans".

The Atari 2600 version was awarded a Certificate of Merit in the category of "Best Action Videogame" at the 5th annual Arkie Awards for 1983. They compared it to Vanguard and said it "provides the same brand of relentless, multi-scenario action".

== Legacy ==
Super Cobra appeared alongside Scramble on the retro compilation Konami Arcade Classics, released for the PlayStation in 1999. Hamster Corporation released the game as part of their Arcade Archives series for the Nintendo Switch and PlayStation 4 in October 2020.

== See also ==
- Cosmic Avenger
- Vanguard
