= Mikie =

1984 video game

- International arcade flyer
- Developers: Konami; Imagine Software (ports)
- Publishers: Arcade: JP/EU: Konami; NA: Centuri; Ports; Imagine Software
- Platforms: Arcade, Acorn Electron, Amstrad CPC, BBC Micro, Commodore 64, MSX, SG-1000, ZX Spectrum
- Release: JP: September 27, 1984; EU: October 1984; NA: November 1984
- Genre: Maze
- Modes: Single-player, multiplayer

Mikie, known as Shinnyū Shain Tōru-kun (Note: Japanese: 新入社員とおるくん, Hepburn: Freshman Employee Toru) in Japan, is an arcade video game developed and released by Konami in 1984. The object of the game is to guide a student named Mikie around the school locations to collect hearts which make up a letter from his girlfriend while being chased by members of the school staff. In Japan, the game's setting was changed to an office in order to avoid controversy, while the original version of the game was released internationally. Centuri distributed the game in North America.

== Gameplay ==
The game starts at the classroom where Toru Mikie (美紀 徹, Miki Tōru) gets out of his seat for the player to begin the game. Mikie must bump the students out of their seats, to collect the hearts they're sitting on, while simultaneously avoiding the classroom teacher. Once all hearts are collected by the player he is allowed to leave the room and enter the school corridor.

The school corridor is where Mikie will be chased by the janitor and his classroom teacher, who follows him outside. This is the way to gain access to the rest of the school building, each room representing a different challenge or level. Mikie will be cued to the proper door to enter by a large, flashing "In" - opening any other door will result in Mikie being punched by a coiled boxing glove or hairy foot, stunning him. One of the doors, however, contains a scantily clad girl: opening this door is worth 5,000 points. Mikie can also pick up extra points by picking up lunch boxes and opening a grate that contains a burger and soda. In addition to head-butting, enemies (the janitor and the classroom teacher) can also be stunned by slamming doors in their faces.

The second room is the locker room, where the objective is to break the lockers to get the hearts, while being pursued by a janitor, a cook, and the classroom teacher. In addition to the head-butting, there are three bins of basketballs located around the room, which Mikie can pick up and throw using the action button. Each bin holds three basketballs.

Room three is the cafeteria where Mikie is pursued by two cooks and, again, the classroom teacher. One cook who stands at the top of the room occasionally throws a leg of meat directly at Mikie. On each table are roasts (3 per table) which Mikie can hurl at his enemies.

Room four sees the student in the Dance Studio, where he must avoid dancing girls who stun him, as well as the dance instructor and, yet again, his classroom teacher.

The final stage has Mikie avoiding football players in the garden outside of his school, who are guarding the hearts he must collect, attempting to reach his girlfriend Mandy.

== Release ==
Mikie initially underwent location testing in Japan under its international title, with the same graphics and high school theme that would be used for the game's overseas releases, but Konami chose not release Mikie as is in Japan due to the game's premise of having a protagonist sneaking out of school after incidents of school violence at the time. As a result, an alternative version was produced for Japanese arcades titled Shinnyū Shain Tōru-kun (新入社員とおるくん; "Freshman Employee Toru"), which replaces the school setting with a workplace. The classroom in the first level becomes an office and the teacher into a manager, the dance studio in the third level becomes the OL office, and the other levels (the hallway, the gym, the restaurant and the outdoor garden) are mostly unchanged aside from a few graphical modifications, but the football players in the final level are instead security guards.

The game's soundtrack, which features chiptunes rendition of The Beatles songs "A Hard Day's Night", and "Twist and Shout", had permission granted by JASRAC in Japan, with a license displayed on the instruction card and printed circuit board.

In North America, the game was distributed by Centuri, which had distributed Konami's previous arcade games in the region. In Europe, Konami debuted the game at London's Preview '85 arcade exhibition in November 1984.

A revised version of the game, titled High School Graffiti Mikie, provided less violent action, in which Mikie's physical attack was changed from a head butt to a paralyzing shout, while his "death" animation was changed from rolling around on the floor to sobbing in contrition. The glass jars, which Mikie had to head butt three times to retrieve the heart inside, were replaced with bundles of three hearts, providing the same effect without requiring the player character to head butt glass. In the first level, the writing on the blackboard reads "Failure Teaches Success", instead of "E=MC2". Mikie's shout has no effect on his classroom teacher. After each completed "step" (the loops of the game) in this version, the speed of the enemy characters increases, with some of them even gaining new abilities.

== Ports ==
Mikie was ported to various home computers by Ocean Software subsidiary Imagine Software, with versions released for the Amstrad CPC, Acorn Electron, BBC Micro, Commodore 64 and ZX Spectrum. An SG-1000 version of Shinnyū Shain Tōru-kun, was also released exclusively in Japan by Sega.

== Reception ==
Reception

Award
Publication	Award
Crash	Smash

In Japan, Game Machine listed Shinnyū Shain Tōru-kun on their December 1, 1984 issue as being the second most-successful table arcade unit of the month. In Europe, Mikie was a major success in the coin-op market during 1985.

Computer and Video Games reviewed the game in December 1984, calling it "a weird game" and "one of the most bizarre games" they had played. They noted that "the story is a little more complex" for an arcade game, and that a "certain element of skill is needed to collect and deliver" the messages and for "escaping from the powers above" but said it's "not a game to set the adrenaline running" compared to a shoot 'em up and that the "Japanese must have a very odd idea of what American boys study at school".
