= Namco Classic Collection =

Namco Classic Collection may refer to:

- Namco Classic Collection Vol. 1, a 1995 arcade game compilation that included Galaga, Xevious and Mappy
- Namco Classic Collection Vol. 2, a 1996 arcade game compilation that included Pac-Man, Rally-X and Dig Dug
