= PV-1000 =

Third-generation home video game console manufactured by Casio

Casio PV-1000
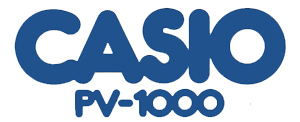

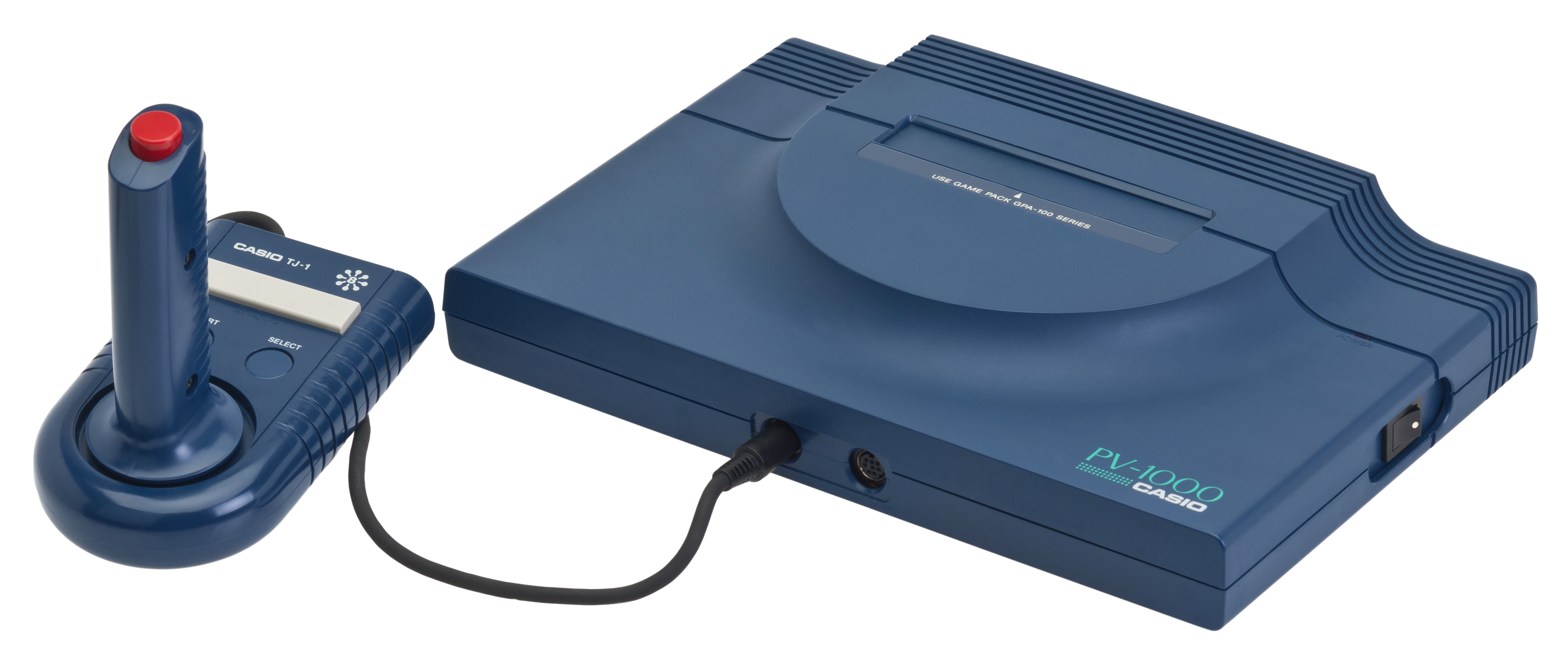
- Manufacturer: Casio
- Type: Home video game console
- Generation: Third
- Released: JP: October 1983
- Lifespan: 1983-1984
- Introductory price: 14,800¥
- Media: ROM cartridge
- CPU: Zilog Z80 @ 3.579 MHz
- Memory: 2 KB RAM
- Display: 240 x 192 resolution, 8 colours
- Graphics: NEC D65010G031
- Sound: NEC D65010G031 - 3 square wave voices, 6 bits to control the period
- Input: Joystick
- Successor: Casio Loopy

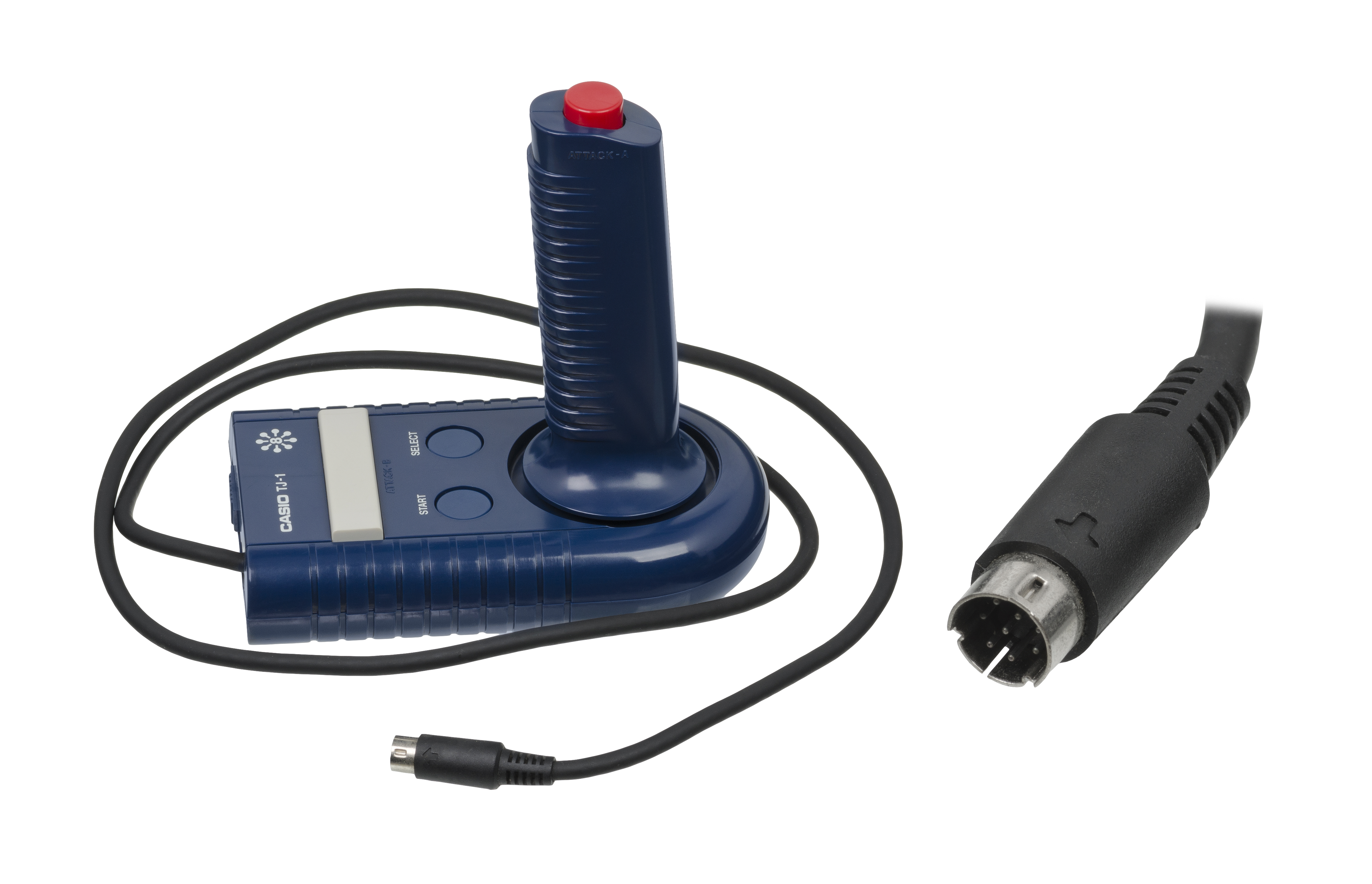
Casio PV-1000 joystick

The Casio PV-1000 (ぴーぶいせん, Pi Bui-Sen) is a third-generation home video game console manufactured by Casio and released in Japan in 1983. It was discontinued less than a year after release.

== History ==
The PV-1000 was released in October 1983. It was only released in Japan where it sold for 14,800 yen. Casio failed to achieve a significant market share. According to retrogames.co.uk the console was pulled after several weeks due to low sales.

== Technical details ==
The PV-1000 is powered by a Zilog Z80 CPU, with 2 KB RAM, shared between the CPU and video generator. The console contains a NEC D65010G031 chip used to output video and sound. It can generate 8 × 8 pixel tiles in a 32 × 24 array, with the two left and two right columns not being displayed. This corresponds to a resolution of 224 × 192 pixels with 8 colours (3-bit RGB). It had three square wave voices with 6 bits to control the period.. The main PV-1000 controller was a joystick.

== PV-1000 games ==
Only thirteen games were released for the Casio PV-1000, listed below by catalog number:

- GPA-101 Pooyan
- GPA-102 Super Cobra
- GPA-103 Tutankham
- GPA-104 Amidar
- GPA-105 Dig Dug
- GPA-106 Warp & Warp
- GPA-107 Turpin
- GPA-109 Pachinko UFO
- GPA-110 Fighting Bug (also known as Lady Bug)
- GPA-111 Space Panic
- GPA-112 Naughty Boy
- GPA-114 Dirty Chameleon
- GPA-115 Excite Mahjong

Note: There are 15 games for the PV-1000, but cartridges GPA-108 and GPA-113 were never released, and are often rumored to be Galaga and Front Line (which were released on the Casio PV-2000).

== See also ==
- PV-2000
- Casio Loopy
