= Pooyan =

1982 video game

- North American arcade flyer
- Developer: Konami
- Publishers: WW: Konami; NA: Stern; NA: Datasoft (Atari 8-bit, C64)
- Designer: Tokuro Fujiwara
- Platforms: Arcade, Atari 2600, Atari 8-bit, TRS-80 Color Computer. Commodore 64, Dragon 32/64, Sord M5, MSX, Apple II, Famicom, TRS-80, Tomy Tutor, PV-1000
- Release: JP: October 1982; NA: November 1982
- Genre: Fixed shooter
- Modes: Single-player, multiplayer

Pooyan (Note: Japanese: プーヤン, Hepburn: Pūyan) is a 1982 fixed shooter video game developed and published by Konami for arcades. It was released in North America by Stern Electronics. The player controls "Mama", a pig whose babies have been kidnapped by a group of wolves. It was later ported to home consoles and personal computers.

== Gameplay ==
Screenshot of arcade version

The player controls Mama Pig, whose babies have been kidnapped by a pack of wolves and who must rescue them using a bow and arrow and slabs of meat. Controls consist of a two-position up/down joystick, which moves an elevator in which Mama Pig rides; and a button, which fires arrows and throws meat.

Each level consists of two rounds. In the first, wolves descend slowly from a high ledge using balloons, which the player must shoot in order to drop them to the ground. Any wolves who reach the ground safely will climb up a set of ladders behind the elevator and try to eat Mama Pig if she moves in front of them. During the second round, the wolves start on the ground and inflate balloons in order to ascend to a cliff on which a boulder is resting so they can push it toward the edge. Airborne wolves throw rocks in both rounds, trying to hit Mama Pig. In addition, the balloon carrying the last "boss" wolf of the second round must be shot several times in order to defeat him; if he reaches the cliff, the player must defeat additional enemies before facing the boss again.

A slab of meat occasionally appears at the top of the elevator's range of motion. Picking it up allows the player to throw it, distracting any wolves on/near its trajectory and causing them to let go of their balloons and crash to the ground for bonus points. Stray balloons and dropped fruits can also be shot for extra points.

After every second round, a bonus screen is played. The first such screen requires the player to defeat a group of wolves using only meat, while the second awards points for shooting fruits thrown by the wolves. These two screens alternate after each level.

The player loses one life if Mama Pig is hit by a rock, eaten by a wolf on the ladders (first round only), or crushed by the boulder if too many wolves reach the cliff and push it over the edge (second round only). When all lives are lost, the game ends.

When the game starts, "The Other Day I Met a Bear" can be heard during the opening scene (in which the wolves kidnap Mama's babies). The first stage theme bears a very slight resemblance to the main theme music from Frogger, another Konami arcade game. The song is a part of the Desecration Rag (An Operatic Nightmare) by Felix Arndt, the portion that mimics the beginning of Antonín Dvořák's Humoresque Opus 101 Number 7. After the second stage is cleared a second time, a part of "Oh! Susanna" can be heard.

== Ports ==
Datasoft released a port of the game programmed by Scott Spanburg for the Atari 8-bit computers, Commodore 64 and Dragon 32/64 in 1983. It was also ported to the Atari 2600, TRS-80 Color Computer, Sord M5, MSX, Apple II, TRS-80, Tomy Tutor, PV-1000, and Famicom.

== Reception ==
InfoWorld's Essential Guide to Atari Computers cited Pooyan as a good Atari arcade game.

== Legacy ==
Pooyan is included on a compilation title Konami Arcade Classics, released on the PlayStation and in arcades with the title Konami 80's AC Special. An emulated version of the game was released in 2006 for PlayStation 2 in Japan as part of the Oretachi Geasen Zoku Sono-series.

The Famicom port was released for the Virtual Console in Japan for the Wii and Wii U.

Hamster Corporation released the game as part of their Oretachi Gēsen Zoku series for the PlayStation 2 in Japan in 2006, as well as their Arcade Archives series for the Nintendo Switch and PlayStation 4 in 2019.

There is a series of extra ops in Metal Gear Solid: Peace Walker known as the "Pooyan Missions", which involves shooting Fulton surface-to-air recovery balloons carrying abducted soldiers off into the air. Sound effects and music from the arcade game are used throughout the mission.

In 2022, Konami organised a contest encouraging indie developers to make games based on some of its classic series, including Pooyan. During the Konami Action & Shooting Contest hosted by the Shueisha Game Creator's Camp and Tokyo Game Show, Yanagi Bashi won the rights from Konami to develop the game through the competition, and a remake game titled Re:Pooyan is in development.

== Highest score ==
David Hanzman of Rochester, NY, USA, scored a world record 1,609,250 points on the arcade version of Pooyan on December 16, 1983.
