= Yolk (magazine) =

Quarterly magazine for young Asian Americans

- Editor-in-Chief: Alex Luu
- Former editors: Larry Tazuma, Philip Chung, George Johnston
- Staff writers: Arnold Gatilao, Spencer Lee, Alex Chan, Barbara Chen, Rita Yoon, Brett Tam, Jonathan Eun, Cat Cruz
- Categories: Asian Americans, popular culture
- Frequency: Quarterly
- Circulation: 50,000
- Publisher: Tommy Tam, Tin Yen, Amy Lee Tu; Stanley Lim (YOLK 2.0)
- First issue: Margaret Cho cover, 1994
- Final issue Number: Sanoe Lake cover, 2004; No. 31
- Company: YOLK
- Country: USA
- Based in: Alhambra, California
- Language: English
- Website: yolk.com

Yolk was a quarterly magazine for young Asian Americans. It was published by InformAsian Media, Inc. (IAMI) between 1994 and 2004, and it was headquartered in Alhambra, California, in Greater Los Angeles. The later incarnations of the magazine were titled Yolk: GenerAsian Next 2.0.

== History and content ==
It was founded in 1994 by Tommy Tam, Tin Yen, and Amy Lee Tu. Tommy Tam was in charge of operations, Tin Yen was the graphic designer/art director, and Amy Tu oversaw the financial aspects of the magazine.

Based in Los Angeles, Yolk's reflection of its generation combines sections on fashion, entertainment and music, book reviews, with occasional in-your-face attacks on our society's misunderstandings of Asian culture. The magazine's premise is that there is something common to Japanese, Korean and Chinese Americans, as well as Vietnamese, Filipinos, Indians and other Asian American groups.

Yolk's first editor was Philip Chung, and managing editor, Larry Tazuma, came up with the magazine's name. "An egg yolk is yellow," he said," and so is the nominal color of Asian people's skin, regardless of nationality." "YOLK draws a strong reaction. But it simply stands for the color of our skin," he says. "It's what connects all Asians." Performance artist and professor Alex Luu served as its editor and graphic designer Max Medina/Mystery Parade served as the Art Designer of YOLK. Staff writers include XD Lim and Margaret Rhee.

As the business grew, operations expanded into the clothing business. YOLK was well known for producing its line of Got Rice? t-shirts under the Brand Fury name. Popular sellers included phrases such as Got Rice?, Got Sushi?, Got Adobo? and Got Pho?

Circulation reached a high of 50,000 in 2000 and targeted English-fluent college-educated Asian Americans coming from various cultures. In 2001, Stanley Lim came in as the new publisher of the magazine. He proposed a new formula heavy on "guy stuff"—reviews of video games and tech gadgets, interviews with models and more bikini-clad women, both on the cover and throughout the pages. But Yolk was not able to sustain success, and folded in 2004 after a 10-year, 31-issue run.

Tommy Tam is currently the VP of Marketing at Dream Tube Entertainment. Tin Yen is still involved with graphic design today and has taught at UCLA Extension in the graphic design program. He founded creative agency TYS Creative, Inc. Amy Lee Tu is currently the Head of Marketing at Indomina Releasing.

As Yolk was closing, Honda Motor Co. offered a four month advertising contract. Lim and the editorial staff changed the publication into a web publication, and asked Honda to provide online advertising banners in lieu of print advertisements. Honda agreed to the change, and Chopblock.com became active.

== Issues list ==
The cover subjects have been well-known celebrities and other notable Asian Americans in the Entertainment field.

- No. 01 - Margaret Cho
- No. 02 - Russell Wong
- No. 03 - Dean Cain
- No. 04 - Ming-Na Wen
- No. 05 - Kiana Tom
- No. 06 - Michelle Yeoh
- No. 07 - Jim Lee
- No. 08 - Shannon Lee
- No. 09 - Sung Hi Lee
- No. 10 - Jet Li
- No. 11 - Adam Saruwatari
- No. 12 - Bai Ling
- No. 13 - Doug Chiang
- No. 14 - Sammo Hung
- No. 15 - Audrey Quock
- No. 16 - Lauren Tom
- No. 17 - Kelly Hu
- No. 18 - Stacy Kamano
- No. 19 - Nicole Bilderback
- No. 20 - Karen Kim
- No. 21 - Michelle Krusiec
- No. 22 - Jodi Ann Paterson
- No. 23 - Marie Matiko
- No. 24 - Dwayne Johnson aka "The Rock"
- No. 25 - Kiana Tom
- No. 26 - Joy Bisco
- No. 27 - Linda Park
- No. 28 - Lexa Doig
- No. 29 - Jimi Mistry
- No. 30 - John Cho
- No. 31 - Sanoe Lake

== See also ==
- Asian Pride
- Asian American
- A. Magazine
- Model Minority#Asian Americans
