= Tomytronic 3D =

Portable handheld gaming device, manufactured by Tomy

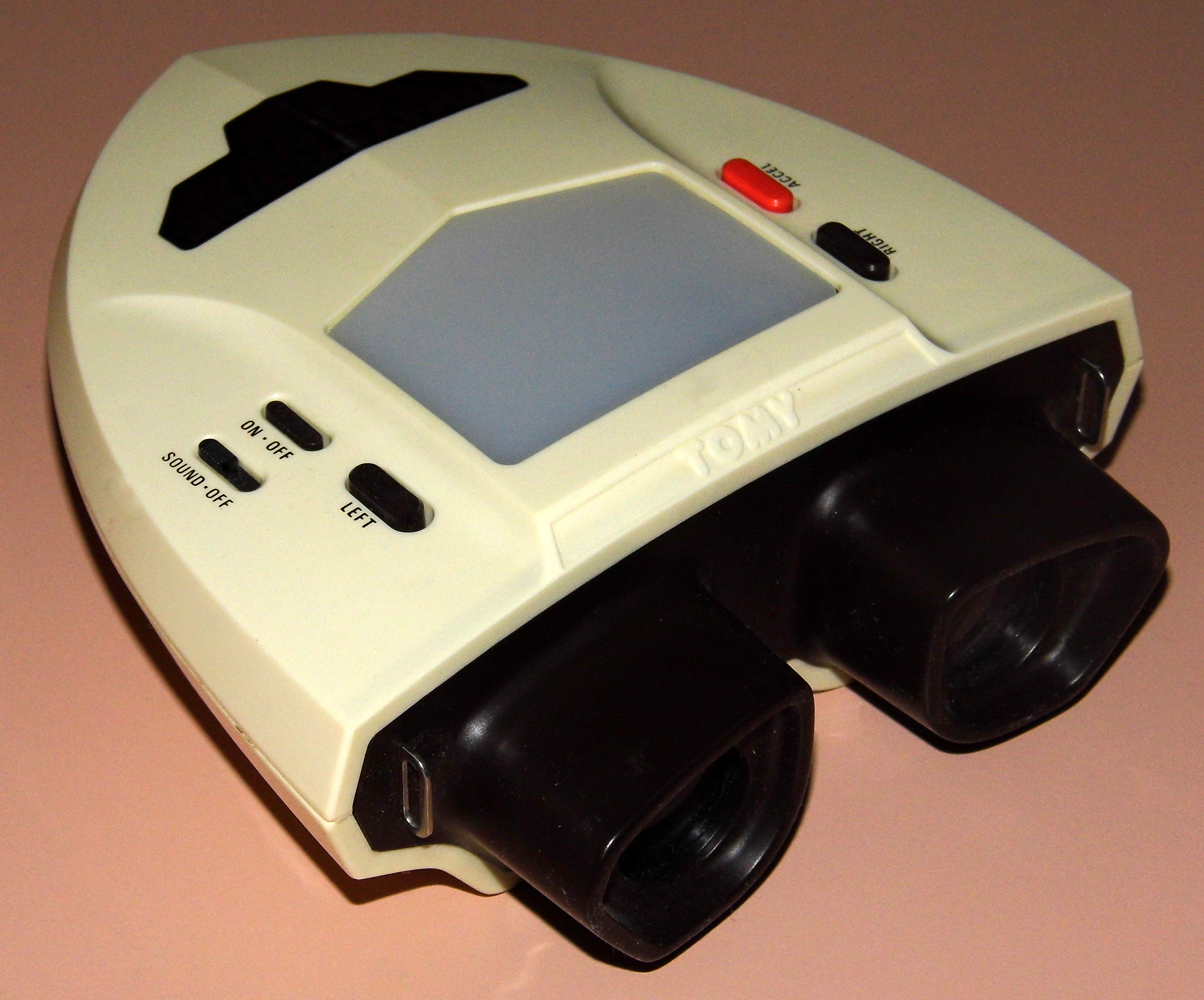
- A Thundering Turbo Tomytronic 3D
- Manufacturer: Tomy
- Released: 1983
- Display: Twin LCD
- Controller input: hand hold
- Weight: 500g

The Tomytronic 3D is a series of portable, handheld gaming devices released by Tomy. The device featured a strap so the player would be able to wear it around the neck in-between playing. The Tomytronic simulated 3D by having two LCD panels that were lit by external light through a window on top of the device. Released in 1983, it was the first dedicated home video 3D hardware.

== Games ==
Seven games were released:

- Skyfighters (AKA Dog Fight / Tandy Sky Duel)
- Thundering Turbo (AKA Cosmos LeMans / Turbo Racer / Thundering Turbos)
- Sky Attack (AKA Tank Attack)
- Shark Attack (AKA Jaws 3D)
- Planet Zeon (AKA Space Laser War / Space Attack)
- Jungle Fighter
- Sherman Attack

In some markets, games were released with a different name as above. One game, Skyfighters, was licensed by Tandy (owner of the Radio Shack and Tandy chains) and renamed Tandy Sky Duel.

The rarest of the seven games are Jungle Fighter and Sherman Attack, both believed to have been released in Japan only.
