= Time Pilot '84 =

1984 video game

- North American arcade flyer
- Developer: Konami
- Publisher: Konami
- Platform: Arcade
- Release: NA: May 1984; JP: June 1984
- Genre: Multidirectional shooter
- Modes: Single-player, multiplayer

Time Pilot '84 (Note: Japanese: タイムパイロット'84, Hepburn: Taimu Pairotto ' 84) is a multidirectional shooter developed and published by Konami. It was released as an arcade video game in North America in May 1984 and Japan in June 1984. The different time periods of 1982's Time Pilot are replaced by a top-down view of a science fiction landscape that varies in color and type of enemies. It adds the ability for the player to launch guided missiles. Time Pilot '84 was primarily sold as a conversion kit for older games.

== Gameplay ==
The first button is used to fire a standard shot, which can destroy green-colored enemies. The second button is used to fire missiles, which can destroy the silver-colored enemies. The player needs to lock on to a silver enemy to fire missiles at it. Destroying enough green enemies brings out a large, silver boss enemy that must be dispatched before advancing to the next level.

== Reception ==
In Japan, Game Machine listed Time Pilot '84 on their August 15, 1984 issue as being the eleventh most-successful table arcade unit of the month.

== Legacy ==
Time Pilot '84 was cloned on the Commodore 64 as Space-Pilot II released by Kingsoft in 1985. The first Space-Pilot was a clone of Time Pilot.

Hamster Corporation released the game as part of their Arcade Archives series for the Nintendo Switch and PlayStation 4 in May 2021.
