= List of Starcade episodes =

This is a list of episodes (excluding the 4 pilot episodes) of the American television game show, Starcade. Contestants competed against one another by playing arcade video games. The series originally aired on WTBS from 1982 to 1983, followed by a run in syndication until its conclusion in 1984. A total of 123 episodes were created and broadcast. The series was first hosted by Mark Richards. Geoff Edwards replaced Richards after the first 23 shows, and continued until the show's cancellation. The majority of episodes featured two players however some episodes had teams consisting of two players making the competition two-on-two. The players would answer questions regarding arcade video games, and the winner would choose from one of five games to play. The points scored on each game would be tallied. The player/team with the most points at the end of the show had the opportunity to play for a grand prize.

== Episodes ==
Starcade episodes
No. overall	No. in season	Format	Host	Featured games					Grand prize	Original release date	Ref.
No. overall	No. in season	Format	Host	Game 1	Game 2	Game 3	Game 4	Game 5	Grand prize	Original release date	Ref.
1	S01E01	One-on-one	Mark Richards	Time Pilot	Tutankham	BurgerTime	Blue Print	Swimmer	Eyes	December 27, 1982	
2	S01E02	One-on-one	Mark Richards	Pooyan	Ms. Pac-Man	Donkey Kong	Moon Patrol	Super Zaxxon	Jungle Hunt	December 28, 1982	
3	S01E03	One-on-one	Mark Richards	Time Pilot	Super Pac-Man	BurgerTime	Monster Bash	Buck Rogers	Tempest	December 29, 1982	
4	S01E04	One-on-one	Mark Richards	Pooyan	Ms. Pac-Man	Super Zaxxon	Jungle Hunt	Eyes	Triple Punch	December 30, 1982	
5	S01E05	One-on-one	Mark Richards	Q*bert	Pole Position	Pengo	Holey Moley	Rescue	BurgerTime	December 31, 1982	
6	S01E06	One-on-one	Mark Richards	Domino Man	Buck Rogers	Tron	Millipede	Donkey Kong Jr.	Reactor	January 3, 1983	
7	S01E07	One-on-one	Mark Richards	Q*bert	Pengo	Robotron	Super Zaxxon	Eyes	Jungle Hunt	January 4, 1983	
8	S01E08	One-on-one	Mark Richards	Domino Man	Buck Rogers	Pole Position	Holey Moley	Rescue	Swimmer	January 5, 1983	
9	S01E09	One-on-one	Mark Richards	Time Pilot	Super Pac-Man	BurgerTime	Blue Print	Swimmer	Slither	January 6, 1983	
10	S01E10	One-on-one	Mark Richards	Q*bert	Super Pac-Man	Robotron	Super Zaxxon	Burnin' Rubber	Pooyan	January 7, 1983	
11	S01E11	One-on-one	Mark Richards	Donkey Kong	Pooyan	Pengo	Xevious	Popeye	BurgerTime	January 10, 1983	
12	S01E12	One-on-one	Mark Richards	Q*bert	Star Trek	Pole Position	BurgerTime	Millipede	Wacko	January 11, 1983	
13	S01E13	One-on-one	Mark Richards	Munch Mobile	Pooyan	Millipede	Ms. Pac-Man	Galaga	Tempest	January 12, 1983	
14	S01E14	One-on-one	Mark Richards	Super Pac-Man	Donkey Kong Jr.	Ms. Pac-Man	Donkey Kong	Pac-Man	Popeye	January 13, 1983	
15	S01E15	One-on-one	Mark Richards	Donkey Kong	Wacko	Q*bert	Bagman	Pole Position	Xevious	January 14, 1983	
16	S01E16	One-on-one	Mark Richards	Lost Tomb	Donkey Kong Jr.	Ms. Pac-Man	Lock 'n' Chase	Pac-Man	Q*bert	January 17, 1983	
17	S01E17	One-on-one	Mark Richards	Time Pilot	Star Trek	Bagman	Xevious	Super Zaxxon	Donkey Kong Jr.	January 18, 1983	
18	S01E18	One-on-one	Mark Richards	Pengo	Popeye	Q*bert	BurgerTime	Pooyan	Wacko	January 19, 1983	
19	S01E19	One-on-one	Mark Richards	Super Pac-Man	Buck Rogers	Tac/Scan	Star Trek	Super Zaxxon	Pooyan	January 20, 1983	
20	S01E20	One-on-one	Mark Richards	Rescue	Lock 'n' Chase	Lost Tomb	Super Pac-Man	Time Pilot	Wacko	January 21, 1983	
21	S01E21	One-on-one	Mark Richards	Munch Mobile	Buck Rogers	Tac/Scan	Star Trek	Galaga	Pooyan	January 24, 1983	
22	S01E22	One-on-one	Mark Richards	Pooyan	Wacko	Bagman	Popeye	Pole Position	Q*bert	January 25, 1983	
23	S01E23	One-on-one	Mark Richards	Rescue	Super Zaxxon	Galaga	Time Pilot	Explorer	Wacko	January 26, 1983	
34 (Note: Episode numbering changed upon the switchout of hosts from Richards to Edwards)	S01E24	One-on-one	Geoff Edwards	Star Trek	Galaxian	Journey	Stargate	Zoar	Munch Mobile	January 27, 1983	
35 (Note: Episode 35 is the only episode not known to exist according to the Starcade official website)		Teams	Geoff Edwards	Xevious	Galaga	Joust	Pac-Man	Pro Bowling	Black Widow	August 22, 1983	
36		One-on-one	Geoff Edwards	Krull	Galaxian	Guzzler	Bagman	Wild Western	Buck Rogers	August 23, 1983	
37		One-on-one	Geoff Edwards	Wacko	Journey	Congo Bongo	Krull	Buck Rogers	Sinistar	August 24, 1983	
38		Champions	Geoff Edwards	Dragon's Lair only					Trip to Hawaii	August 25, 1983	
39		Teams	Geoff Edwards	Sinistar	Berzerk	Munch Mobile	Zoo Keeper	Bubbles	Tron		
40		One-on-one	Geoff Edwards	Popeye	Bump 'n' Jump	Super Pac-Man	Donkey Kong Jr.	Tazz-Mania	Buck Rogers		
41		One-on-one	Geoff Edwards	Sinistar	Gyruss	Super Zaxxon	Tron	Krull	Wacko		
42		One-on-one	Geoff Edwards	Tac/Scan	Bubbles	Arabian	Popeye	Bagman	RB5X		
43		Champions	Geoff Edwards	Zoo Keeper	Tac/Scan	Mario Bros.	Gyruss	MotoRace USA	RB5X		
44		One-on-one	Geoff Edwards	Tac/Scan	Pro Bowling	Millipede	Wild Western	Donkey Kong	Pengo	September 2, 1983	
45		One-on-one	Geoff Edwards	Pengo	Qix	Congo Bongo	Graplop	Gyruss	Tron	September 6, 1983	
46		One-on-one	Geoff Edwards	Wild Western	Wacko	Pengo	Zoo Keeper	BurgerTime	Q*bert		
47		Teams	Geoff Edwards	Congo Bongo	Zoar	Food Fight	Tron	Super Pac-Man	Journey		
48		Champions	Geoff Edwards	Buck Rogers	Zoo Keeper	Gyruss	Star Wars	Congo Bongo	RB5X		
49		Teams	Geoff Edwards	Bump 'n' Jump	Popeye	Space Invaders	Donkey Kong Jr.	Tazz-Mania	RB5X	September 12, 1983	
50		One-on-one	Geoff Edwards	Munch Mobile	Pole Position	Star Trek	Tron	Super Pac-Man	Journey	September 13, 1983	
51		One-on-one	Geoff Edwards	Star Trek	Galaxian	Journey	Stargate	Zoar	Munch Mobile		
52		One-on-one	Geoff Edwards	Donkey Kong Jr	Pac-Man	Super Pac-Man	Ms. Pac-Man	Donkey Kong	RB5X		
53		Champions	Geoff Edwards	Star Wars only					Trip to Hawaii and Star Wars	September 16, 1983	
54		One-on-one	Geoff Edwards	Krull	Solar Fox	Star Trek	Sinistar	Galaxian	Bubbles	September 19, 1983	
55		One-on-one	Geoff Edwards	Xevious	Stargate	Pole Position	Cosmic Chasm	Crystal Castles	Sinistar		
56		Teams	Geoff Edwards	Buck Rogers	Time Pilot	Xevious	Bagman	Gyruss	Tron		
57		One-on-one	Geoff Edwards	Bump 'n' Jump	Pop Flamer	Wild Western	Galaxian	Congo Bongo	RB5X		
58		Champions	Geoff Edwards	Star Trek	Crystal Castles	Galaga	Bubbles	Arabian	RB5X		
59		One-on-one	Geoff Edwards	Pole Position	Journey	Star Wars	Donkey Kong Jr.	Joust	Bump 'n' Jump	September 26, 1983	
60		One-on-one	Geoff Edwards	Donkey Kong Jr.	Congo Bongo	Munch Mobile	BurgerTime	Mappy	Tron	September 27, 1983	
61		Teams	Geoff Edwards	Graplop	Q*bert	Congo Bongo	Time Pilot	Galaga	Tron	September 28, 1983	
62		One-on-one	Geoff Edwards	Super Pac-Man	Super Zaxxon	Bagman	Pole Position	Star Trek	BurgerTime	September 29, 1983	
63		Champions	Geoff Edwards	Pole Position	Gyruss	Zoo Keeper	Star Wars	Krull	RB5X		
64		One-on-one	Geoff Edwards	Crystal Castles	Pengo	Arabian	Ms. Pac-Man	Xevious	Munch Mobile	October 3, 1983	
65		One-on-one	Geoff Edwards	Gyruss	Mappy	Munch Mobile	Journey	BurgerTime	Amidar	October 4, 1983	
66		Teams	Geoff Edwards	Super Cobra	Zoar	Bagman	Guzzler	Popeye	Pengo	October 5, 1983	
67		One-on-one	Geoff Edwards	Wild Western	Sinistar	Super Cobra	Moon Patrol	Journey	Wacko	October 6, 1983	
68		Champion Teams	Geoff Edwards	Zoar	Guzzler	Time Pilot	Super Zaxxon	Super Pac-Man	RB5X		
69		One-on-one	Geoff Edwards	Graplop	Zoo Keeper	Bagman	Donkey Kong Jr.	Pengo	BurgerTime	October 10, 1983	
70		Teams	Geoff Edwards	Tazz-Mania	Moon Patrol	Super Cobra	Tron	Space Invaders	Gravitar	October 11, 1983	
71		One-on-one	Geoff Edwards	Berzerk	Star Wars	Pole Position	MotoRace USA	Tac/Scan	RB5X	October 12, 1983	
72		One-on-one	Geoff Edwards	Mazer Blazer	Xevious	Bagman	Journey	Amidar	Munch Mobile	October 13, 1983	
73		Champions	Geoff Edwards	Millipede	Xevious	Mappy	Star Wars	Wacko	Trip to Hawaii	October 14, 1983	
74		One-on-one	Geoff Edwards	Stargate	Bubbles	Tazz-Mania	Qix	Journey	Q*bert	October 17, 1983	
75		One-on-one	Geoff Edwards	Wacko	Mappy	Journey	Moon Patrol	Graplop	Sinistar	October 18, 1983	
76		One-on-one	Geoff Edwards	Buck Rogers	Graplop	Mario Bros.	Pengo	Popeye	Rescue	October 19, 1983	
77		Teams	Geoff Edwards	Pro Bowling	Q*bert	Guzzler	Crystal Castles	Galaga	RB5X	October 20, 1983	
78		Champions	Geoff Edwards	Time Pilot	Star Wars	Popeye	Donkey Kong Jr.	Dorodon	Trip to Hawaii	October 21, 1983	
79		Teams	Geoff Edwards	Gravitar	Congo Bongo	Stargate	Wild Western	Berzerk	Super Pac-Man	September 20, 1983	
80		One-on-one	Geoff Edwards	Donkey Kong Jr.	Pac-Man	Super Pac-Man	Ms. Pac-Man	Donkey Kong	RB5X		
81		One-on-one	Geoff Edwards	MotoRace USA	Star Wars	Tron	Super Zaxxon	Cosmic Chasm	RB5X	October 26, 1983	
82		Teams	Geoff Edwards	Wacko	Mappy	Arabian	Popeye	Donkey Kong Jr.	Amidar	October 27, 1983	
83		Champions	Geoff Edwards	Bubbles	Guzzler	Sinistar	Zoo Keeper	Congo Bongo	Trip to Hawaii		
84		Teams	Geoff Edwards	Super Pac-Man	Bump 'n' Jump	Time Pilot	Joust	Zoar	Black Widow	October 31, 1983	
85		One-on-one	Geoff Edwards	Wacko	Zoo Keeper	Arabian	Congo Bongo	Mario Bros.	Amidar		
86		One-on-one	Geoff Edwards	Q*bert	Bump 'n' Jump	Pole Position	Mario Bros.	Ms. Pac-Man	Black Widow		
87		One-on-one	Geoff Edwards	Mario Bros	Q*bert	Dorodon	Berzerk	Pengo	Super Zaxxon	November 3, 1983	
88		One-on-one	Geoff Edwards	Black Widow	Mazer Blazer	Star Wars	Arabian	Pole Position	Zoo Keeper		
89		One-on-one	Geoff Edwards	Buck Rogers	Solar Fox	Journey	Super Zaxxon	Gyruss	Bubbles		
90		One-on-one	Geoff Edwards	Bubbles	Star Wars	Stargate	Arabian	Black Widow	Tac/Scan	December 27, 1983	
91		One-on-one	Geoff Edwards	Berzerk	Space Invaders	Moon Patrol	Donkey Kong Jr.	Super Cobra	Buck Rogers	December 28, 1983	
92		One-on-one	Geoff Edwards	Scramble	Super Cobra	Guzzler	Time Pilot	Tazz-Mania	RB5X	December 29, 1983	
93		Teams	Geoff Edwards	Pro Bowling	Popeye	Mappy	Donkey Kong Jr.	Galaxian	Dorodon	December 30, 1983	
94		One-on-one	Geoff Edwards	Pole Position II (various tracks)	TX-1				Pole Position II	January 2, 1984	
95		Teams	Geoff Edwards	Stargate	Roc'n Rope	Dig Dug	Major Havoc	Interstellar Laser Fantasy	Mega Zone	January 3, 1984	
96		One-on-one	Geoff Edwards	Track & Field (All events)					Track & Field	January 4, 1984	
97		One-on-one	Geoff Edwards	Dragon's Lair	Pole Position II	Bega's Battle	Sinistar	Astron Belt	Seeburg Jukebox	January 5, 1984	
98		One-on-one	Geoff Edwards	Bega's Battle	Pole Position II	Cube Quest	M.A.C.H. 3	Track & Field	Moon Patrol	January 6, 1984	
99		One-on-one	Geoff Edwards	Dragon's Lair Only					Dragon's Lair	January 9, 1984	
100		One-on-one	Geoff Edwards	Mega Zone	Pole Position II	Bega's Battle	Cosmic Chasm	M.A.C.H. 3	Seeburg Jukebox	January 10, 1984	
101		Teams	Geoff Edwards	Donkey Kong 3	Star Wars	MotoRace USA	Juno First	Elevator Action	Mr. Do!	January 11, 1984	
102		One-on-one	Geoff Edwards	Astron Belt	Blaster	Cube Quest	Star Wars	Mazer Blazer	Mega Zone	January 12, 1984	
103		One-on-one	Geoff Edwards	Cliff Hanger only					Cliff Hanger	January 13, 1984	
104		Teams	Geoff Edwards	Ms. Pac-Man	Pac-Man Plus	Pac-Man	Super Pac-Man	Snake Pit	Seeburg Jukebox	January 16, 1984	
105		One-on-one	Geoff Edwards	Mr. Do's Castle	Pole Position II	Cliff Hanger	Mr. Do!	Bega's Battle	Joust	January 17, 1984	
106		Teams	Geoff Edwards	MotoRace USA	Track & Field	Tron	Pro Soccer	Spy Hunter	Super Zaxxon	January 18, 1984	
107		One-on-one	Geoff Edwards	MotoRace USA	The Pit	Roc'n Rope	Solar Fox	Discs of Tron	Front Line	January 19, 1984	
108		Teams	Geoff Edwards	Change Lanes	Marvin's Maze	Elevator Action	Major Havoc	Snake Pit	Super Zaxxon	January 20, 1984	
109		Teams	Geoff Edwards	Star Wars	Tunnel Hunt	Pac-Man Plus	Super Astro Fighter	Calipso	Joust	January 23, 1984	
110		One-on-one	Geoff Edwards	Dragon's Lair	The Pit	Blaster	Cosmic Chasm	Mr. Do's Castle	Seeburg Jukebox	January 24, 1984	
111		Teams	Geoff Edwards	Change Lanes	Track & Field	Pole Position II	MotoRace USA	TX-1	Crystal Castles	January 25, 1984	
112		One-on-one	Geoff Edwards	Frogger	Dig Dug	Discs of Tron	M.A.C.H. 3	Super Astro Fighter	Moon Patrol	January 26, 1984	
113		Teams	Geoff Edwards	Bubbles	Anteater	Q*bert	Cosmic Chasm	Dig Dug	Stargate	January 27, 1984	
114		One-on-one	Geoff Edwards	Dragon's Lair	Change Lanes	M.A.C.H. 3	Robotron	Astron Belt	Moon Patrol	January 30, 1984	
115		One-on-one	Geoff Edwards	Dig Dug	Mr. Do's Castle	Discs of Tron	Angler Dangler	Frogger	Mega Zone	January 31, 1984	
116		Teams	Geoff Edwards	Pro Soccer	Pac-Man	MotoRace USA	Spy Hunter	Elevator Action	Mr. Do!	February 1, 1984	
117		One-on-one	Geoff Edwards	Mr. Do's Castle	Pole Position II	Astron Belt	Juno First	M.A.C.H. 3	Seeburg Jukebox	February 2, 1984	
118		One-on-one	Geoff Edwards	Sinistar	M.A.C.H. 3	Pole Position II	MotoRace USA	TX-1	Joust	February 3, 1984	
119		One-on-one	Geoff Edwards	Dig Dug	Lady Bug	Discs of Tron	Angler Dangler	Dragon's Lair	Mega Zone	February 6, 1984	
120		Teams	Geoff Edwards	Joust	MotoRace USA	Major Havoc	Crystal Castles	Elevator Action	Stargate	February 7, 1984	
121		Teams	Geoff Edwards	Star Wars	Anteater	Zoo Keeper	Dorodon	Munch Mobile	Tron	February 8, 1984	
122		One-on-one	Geoff Edwards	Blaster	Q*bert	Astron Belt	Super Astro Fighter	Stargate	Joust	February 9, 1984	
123		One-on-one	Geoff Edwards	Pac-Man Plus	Mr. Do's Castle	Discs of Tron	Cliff Hanger	Q*bert	Moon Patrol	February 10, 1984	
124		One-on-one	Geoff Edwards	Robotron	Dig Dug	Cosmic Chasm	Pole Position II	Zoo Keeper	Seeburg Jukebox	February 13, 1984	
125		Teams	Geoff Edwards	Major Havoc	Elevator Action	Stargate	Joust	Roc'n Rope	Tron	February 14, 1984	
126		One-on-one	Geoff Edwards	MotoRace USA	Krull	Change Lanes	Sinistar	Mazer Blazer	Front Line	February 15, 1984	
127		Teams	Geoff Edwards	Crystal Castles	Mazer Blazer	Astron Belt	Juno First	M.A.C.H. 3	Marvin's Maze	February 16, 1984	
128		Teams	Geoff Edwards	Stargate	Roc'n Rope	Tron	Lady Bug	Pac-Man Plus	Joust	February 17, 1984	
129		Teams	Geoff Edwards	Frogger	Star Wars	Zoo Keeper	Moon Patrol	Super Astro Fighter	Angler Dangler	February 20, 1984	
130		One-on-one	Geoff Edwards	Dragon's Lair	Krull	Pac-Man Plus	MotoRace USA	Q*bert	Tron	February 21, 1984	
131		Teams	Geoff Edwards	Roc'n Rope	Dorodon	Solar Fox	Moon Patrol	Astron Belt	Joust	February 22, 1984	
132		Teams	Geoff Edwards	Q*bert	Cosmic Chasm	Mazer Blazer	Moon Patrol	Angler Dangler	Super Astro Fighter	February 23, 1984	
133		Teams	Geoff Edwards	Zoo Keeper	Calipso	Sinistar	Change Lanes	Dig Dug	Moon Patrol	February 24, 1984	
