= List of games at Funspot =

This is a list of games at Funspot, an arcade located in the village of Weirs Beach in Laconia, New Hampshire, United States. Funspot is ranked by Guinness World Records as the world's largest arcade. The majority of games at Funspot are part of the American Classic Arcade Museum's collection, a non-profit organization located on Funspot's second floor, whose goal is to "promote and preserve the history of coin-operated arcade games."

== Games ==
The following tables list games located at Funspot. The lists are divided into the American Classic Arcade Museum games and games elsewhere in the center.

=== American Classic Arcade Museum ===
Game	Type	Publisher	Year released
1942	Video game	Capcom	1984
1943: The Battle of Midway	Video game	Capcom	1987
720 Degrees	Video game	Atari Games	1986
A.P.B.	Video game	Atari Games	1987
After Burner	Video game	Sega	1987
Alien Syndrome	Video game	Sega	1987
Alpine Ski	Video game	Taito	1981
Arkanoid	Video game	Taito	1986
Asteroids	Video game	Atari, Inc.	1979
Asteroids Deluxe	Video game	Atari, Inc.	1980
Astro Fighter	Video game	Data East	1980
Astro Invader	Video game	Stern	1980
Astron Belt	Video game	Sega	1983
Atari Basketball	Video game	Atari, Inc.	1979
Ataxx	Video game	Leland	1990
Bagman	Video game	Valadon Automation	1982
Bank Panic	Video game	Sega	1985
Battlezone	Video game	Atari, Inc.	1980
Berzerk	Video game	Stern	1980
Blueprint	Video game	Bally Midway	1982
Bosconian	Video game	Namco	1981
Breakout	Video game	Atari, Inc.	1976
Buck Rogers: Planet of Zoom	Video game	Sega	1982
Bump 'n' Jump	Video game	Data East	1982
BurgerTime	Video game	Data East	1982
Canyon Bomber	Video game	Atari, Inc.	1978
Carnival	Video game	Sega	1980
Centipede	Video game	Atari, Inc.	1980
Challenger	Video game	Hudson Soft	1985
Champion Baseball	Video game	Sega	1983
Cheeky Mouse	Video game	Universal	1980
Cheyenne	Video game	Exidy	1984
Chiller	Video game	Exidy	1986
Choplifter	Video game	Sega	1982
Circus Charlie	Video game	Konami	1984
Cloak & Dagger	Video game	Atari, Inc.	1983
Clowns	Video game	Midway	1978
Commando	Video game	Capcom	1985
Computer Space	Video game	Nutting Associates	1971
Congo Bongo	Video game	Sega	1983
Contra	Video game	Konami	1987
Crazy Climber	Video game	Nichibutsu	1980
Crazy Kong	Video game	Falcon	1981
Crossbow	Video game	Exidy	1983
Crowns Golf	Video game	Nasco	1984
Crowns Golf Hawaii	Video game	Nasco	1985
Crystal Castles	Video game	Atari, Inc.	1983
Dark Adventure	Video game	Konami	1987
Defender	Video game	Williams	1980
Deluxe Space Invaders	Video game	Taito	1979
Death Race	Video game	Exidy	1976
Depthcharge	Video game	Gremlin	1977
Destroyer	Video game	Epyx	1986
Dig Dug	Video game	Namco	1982
Domino Man	Video game	Bally Midway	1983
Donkey Kong	Video game	Nintendo	1981
Donkey Kong Jr.	Video game	Nintendo	1982
Double Dragon	Video game	Technōs Japan	1987
Double Dribble	Video game	Konami	1986
Drag Race	Video game	Atari, Inc.	1977
Dragon Spirit	Video game	Namco	1987
Dragon's Lair	Video game	Cinematronics	1983
Dragon's Lair II: Time Warp	Video game	Leland	1991
Eagle	Video game	Centuri	1980
Elevator Action	Video game	Taito	1983
Enduro Racer	Video game	Sega-AM2	1986
Fax	Video game	Exidy	1983
Final Lap	Video game	Namco	1987
Fire Truck	Video game	Atari, Inc.	1978
Flower	Video game	Komax	1986
Food Fight	Video game	Atari, Inc.	1983
Frogger	Video game	Konami	1981
Galaga	Video game	Namco	1981
Galaxian	Video game	Namco	1979
Gauntlet	Video game	Atari Games	1985
Gauntlet II	Video game	Atari Games	1986
Ghosts 'n Goblins	Video game	Capcom	1985
Gladiator	Video game	Taito	1986
Gorf	Video game	Midway	1981
Grand Champion	Video game	Taito	1981
Gravitar	Video game	Atari, Inc.	1982
Guerrilla War	Video game	SNK	1987
Guided Missile	Video game	Bally Midway	1977
Gun Fight	Video game	Midway	1975
Gun.Smoke	Video game	Capcom	1985
Gyruss	Video game	Konami	1983
Hang-On (ride-on)	Video game	Sega AM2	1985
Hard Drivin'	Video game	Atari Games	1989
Heavy Barrel	Video game	Data East	1987
Ikari Warriors	Video game	SNK	1986
Indiana Jones and the Temple of Doom	Video game	Atari Games	1985
Indy 4	Video game	Atari, Inc.	1976
Joust (cocktail)	Video game	Williams	1982
Joust 2	Video game	Williams	1986
Jungle Hunt	Video game	Taito	1982
Jr. Pac-Man	Video game	Midway	1983
Kangaroo	Video game	Atari, Inc.	1982
Karate Champ	Video game	Data East	1984
Kick Man	Video game	Midway	1981
Krull	Video game	Gottlieb	1983
Kung-Fu Master	Video game	Irem	1984
Land Sea Air Squad (cocktail)	Video game	Taito	1986
Lazarian	Video game	Bally Midway	1981
LeMans	Video game	Atari, Inc.	1976
Leprechaun	Video game	Tong Electronic	1982
Liberator	Video game	Atari, Inc.	1982
Lode Runner	Video game	Irem	1983
Lunar Rescue	Video game	Taito	1979
Major Havoc	Video game	Atari, Inc.	1983
Make Trax	Video game	Williams	1981
Mania Challenge	Video game	Taito	1986
Mappy	Video game	Namco	1983
Marble Madness	Video game	Atari Games	1984
Mario Bros.	Video game	Nintendo	1983
Millipede	Video game	Atari, Inc.	1982
Missile Command	Video game	Atari, Inc.	1980
Monaco GP	Video game	Sega	1979
Moon Patrol	Video game	Irem	1982
Moon War	Video game	Stern	1981
Motorace USA	Video game	Irem	1983
Mouse Trap	Video game	Exidy	1981
Mr. Do!	Video game	Universal	1982
Mr. Do's Wild Ride	Video game	Universal	1984
Ms. Pac-Man	Video game	Midway	1981
Night Driver	Video game	Atari, Inc.	1976
New Rally-X	Video game	Namco	1981
Omega Race	Video game	Midway	1981
Operation Wolf	Video game	Taito	1987
Out Run	Video game	Sega	1986
Pac-Man	Video game	Namco	1980
Pac-Man Plus	Video game	Midway	1982
Paperboy	Video game	Atari Games	1984
Pengo	Video game	Sega	1982
Phoenix	Video game	Centuri	1980
PlayChoice-10	Video game	Nintendo	1986
Pleiads	Video game	Tecmo	1981
Pole Position (cockpit)	Video game	Namco	1982
Pole Position II (cockpit)	Video game	Namco	1983
Pong	Video game	Atari, Inc.	1972
Pong Doubles	Video game	Atari, Inc.	1973
Popeye	Video game	Nintendo	1982
Pulsar	Video game	Sega	1981
Punch-Out!!	Video game	Nintendo	1983
Q-Bert	Video game	Gottlieb	1982
Q-Bert's Qubes	Video game	Gottlieb	1983
Qix	Video game	Taito	1981
Quantum	Video game	Atari, Inc.	1982
Quartet	Video game	Sega	1986
Radical Radial	Video game	Nichibutsu	1982
Rally-X	Video game	Namco	1980
Rampage	Video game	Midway	1986
Red Alert	Video game	Irem	1981
Red Baron (cockpit)	Video game	Atari, Inc.	1980
Ring King	Video game	Data East	1985
Road Runner	Video game	Atari Games	1985
Roadblasters	Video game	Atari Games	1987
Robot Bowl	Video game	Exidy	1977
Robotron: 2084	Video game	Williams	1982
Rolling Thunder	Video game	Namco	1986
Rush'n Attack	Video game	Konami	1985
S.T.U.N. Runner	Video game	Atari Games	1989
Satan's Hollow	Video game	Bally Midway	1982
Scramble	Video game	Konami	1981
Sea Wolf	Video game	Midway	1976
Shooting Master	Video game	Sega	1984
Shootout (cocktail)	Video game	Data East	1985
Sky Shark	Video game	Taito	1987
Solar Fox	Video game	Midway	1981
Space Ace	Video game	Cinematronics	1984
Space Duel	Video game	Atari, Inc.	1982
Space Harrier	Video game	Sega	1985
Space Invaders	Video game	Midway	1978
Spectar	Video game	Exidy	1980
Speed Buggy Buggy Boy	Video game	Tatsumi	1986
Sprint 2	Video game	Kee Games	1976
Spy Hunter (cockpit)	Video game	Bally Midway	1983
Star Castle	Video game	Cinematronics	1980
Star Trek	Video game	Sega	1983
Star Wars	Video game	Atari, Inc.	1983
Star Wars: Return of the Jedi	Video game	Atari, Inc.	1984
Stargate	Video game	Williams	1981
Starship 1	Video game	Atari, Inc.	1977
Stratovox (cocktail)	Video game	Taito	1980
Super Breakout	Video game	Atari, Inc.	1976
Super Bug	Video game	Atari, Inc.	1977
Super Cobra	Video game	Konami	1981
Super Mario Bros.	Video game	Nintendo	1983
Super Pac Man	Video game	Midway	1982
Super Sprint	Video game	Atari Games	1986
Super Zaxxon	Video game	Sega	1982
Tag Team Wrestling	Video game	Data East	1983
Tank II	Video game	Kee Games	1974
Tapper	Video game	Bally Midway	1983
Tempest	Video game	Atari, Inc.	1981
Tetris	Video game	Atari Games	1988
The End	Video game	Konami	1981
The Glob	Video game	Epos	1983
The Real Ghostbusters	Video game	Data East	1987
Thief	Video game	Pacific Novelty	1981
Thunder Blade	Video game	Sega	1987
Tiger Road	Video game	Romstar	1987
Timber	Video game	Midway Games	1984
Time Pilot	Video game	Konami	1982
Track & Field	Video game	Konami	1983
Triple Hunt	Video game	Atari	1977
Tron	Video game	Bally Midway	1982
Turbo (cockpit)	Video game	Sega	1989
Turkey Shoot	Video game	Williams	1984
Tutankham	Video game	Konami	1982
Us Vs. Them	Video game	Mylstar	1984
Vanguard	Video game	Centuri	1981
Venture	Video game	Exidy	1981
Video Pinball	Video game	Atari	1978
VS. Dr. Mario	Video game	Nintendo	1990
VS. Duck Hunt	Video game	Nintendo	1984
VS. Golf	Video game	Nintendo	1984
VS. Hogan's Alley	Video game	Nintendo	1984
VS. Tennis (cocktail)	Video game	Nintendo	1984
Warlords	Video game	Atari, Inc.	1980
Wheels	Video game	Midway	1975
Wheels II	Video game	Midway	1975
Wild Western	Video game	Taito	1982
Wizard of Wor	Video game	Midway	1980
Wonder Boy	Video game	Sega	1986
Xenophobe	Video game	Bally Midway	1987
Xevious	Video game	Namco	1983
X-Men	Video game	Konami	1992
Xybots	Video game	Atari Games	1987
Zaxxon	Video game	Sega	1982
Zoo Keeper	Video game	Taito	1982
Big Guns	Pinball		
Black Knight	Pinball		
Close Encounters of the Third Kind	Pinball		
Cyclone	Pinball		
Devil's Dare	Pinball		
Dirty Harry	Pinball		
F-14 Tomcat	Pinball		
Fire	Pinball		
Fireball II	Pinball		
Flash	Pinball		
Genie	Pinball		
Gorgar	Pinball	Williams	1979
Grand Lizard	Pinball		
Grand Slam	Pinball		
Harlem Globetrotters	Pinball		
High Speed	Pinball		
Joker Poker	Pinball		
Jurassic Park	Pinball		
Kiss	Pinball		
Laser War	Pinball		
Mata Hari	Pinball		
Middle Earth	Pinball		
Mr. & Mrs. Pac-Man	Pinball		
Old Chicago	Pinball		
Paragon	Pinball		
Pin*Bot	Pinball		
Playboy	Pinball		
Sky Jump	Pinball		
Space Shuttle	Pinball	Williams	1984
Stop n' Go (display only)	Pinball		
Superman	Pinball		
Time 2000	Pinball		
Time Machine	Pinball		
Xenon	Pinball		
Base Hit	Electro-mechanical		
Foreign Legion	Electro-mechanical		
Line Drive	Electro-mechanical		
Mini Baseball	Electro-mechanical	Chicago Coin	1972
Twin Rifle	Electro-mechanical		
Upper Deck	Electro-mechanical		
Whatizit	Electro-mechanical		

=== Games elsewhere in Funspot ===
Game	Type	Developer	Year released
After Burner	Video game	Sega	1987
Air Raid	Video game	Seibu Kaihatsu	1987
Ameri Darts	Video game	AmeriCorp	1989
Area 51	Video game	Atari Games	1995
Ataxx	Video game	Leland Corporation	1990
ATV Track	Video game	Gaelco	2002
Batman	Video game	Atari Games	1990
Buster Bros.	Video game	Mitchell Corporation	1989
California Speed	Video game	Atari Games	1998
Capcom Bowling	Video game	Incredible Technologies	1988
Chase H.Q.	Video game	Taito	1988
Crazy Taxi	Video game	Sega	1999
Darkstalkers	Video game	Capcom	1994
Daytona USA	Video game	Sega AM2	1993
Daytona USA 2	Video game	Sega	1998
Deal or No Deal	Video game	Innovative Concepts in Entertainment	2006
Double Dragon II: The Revenge	Video game	Technōs Japan	1988
EA Sports NASCAR Racing	Video game	EA Tiburon	2007
Forgotten Worlds	Video game	Capcom	1988
Golden Tee 2003	Video game	Incredible Technologies	2002
Hang-On	Video game	Sega	1985
Hot Rod	Video game	Sega	1988
Hydro Thunder	Video game	Midway Games	1999
Klax	Video game	Atari Games	1990
Let's Go Jungle!: Lost on the Island of Spice	Video game	Sega	2006
Lethal Enforcers	Video game	Konami	1992
The Main Event	Video game	Konami	1988
Mario Kart Arcade GP DX	Video game	Namco	2013
Manx TT	Video game	Sega AM3	1995
Megatouch Force 2005	Video game	Merit Entertainment	2005
Mercs	Video game	Capcom	1990
Mortal Kombat	Video game	Midway	1992
Mortal Kombat II	Video game	Midway	1993
NASCAR Arcade	Video game	Sega Rosso	2000
Ultimate Mortal Kombat 3	Video game	Midway Games	1995
NARC	Video game	Williams Electronics	1988
NBA Jam	Video game	Midway	1993
Ninja Gaiden	Video game	Tecmo	1988
Operation Thunderbolt	Video game	Taito	1988
Out Run	Video game	Sega	1986
Police 911	Video game	Konami	2000
Primal Rage	Video game	Atari Games	1994
Quarterback	Video game	Leland	1987
Race Drivin'	Video game	Atari Games	1990
Run & Gun	Video game	Konami	1993
The Simpsons Arcade Game	Video game	Konami	1991
Skins Game	Video game	Midway Games	2000
Smash TV	Video game	Williams	1990
Star Wars Trilogy Arcade	Video game	Sega AM Annex	1998
Steel Talons	Video game	Atari Games	1991
Street Fighter II: Champion Edition	Video game	Capcom	1992
Super Hang-On	Video game	Sega	1987
Super Off Road	Video game	Leland Corporation	1989
Super Street Fighter II	Video game	Capcom	1993
Superman	Video game	Taito	1988
Terminator 2: Judgment Day	Video game	Midway	1991
Time Crisis	Video game	Namco	1995
Time Crisis 3	Video game	Namco	2002
Teenage Mutant Ninja Turtles	Video game	Konami	1989
Top Skater	Video game	Sega	1997
Trivia Whiz	Video game	Apogee Software	1988
TsuMo	Video game	Tsunami Visual Technologies	2002
V'Ball	Video game	Technōs Japan	1988
Virtua Cop	Video game	Sega AM2	1994
Virtua Racing	Video game	Sega AM2	1992
Wheel of Fortune	Video game	Raw Thrills	2010
WWF Superstars	Video game	Technōs Japan	1989
Addams Family	Pinball	Bally	1992
Cyclone	Pinball	Williams	1988
Elvis	Pinball	Stern	2004
Freddy: A Nightmare on Elm Street	Pinball	Gottlieb	1994
FunHouse	Pinball	Williams	1990
Jokerz	Pinball	Williams	1988
Monopoly	Pinball	Stern Pinball	2001
White Water	Pinball	Williams	1993
