= 1983 in video games =

1983 has seen many sequels and prequels in video games, such as Mario Bros. and Pole Position II, along with new titles such as Astron Belt, Champion Baseball, Dragon's Lair, Elevator Action, Spy Hunter and Track & Field. Major events include the video game crash of 1983 in North America, and the third generation of video game consoles beginning with the launch of Nintendo's Family Computer (Famicom) and Sega's SG-1000 in Japan. The year's highest-grossing video game was Namco's arcade game Pole Position, while the year's best-selling home system was Nintendo's Game & Watch for the third time since 1980.

== Financial performance ==
- In the United States, arcade video game revenues are worth $2.9 billion (equivalent to $9.37 billion adjusted for inflation).
- In the United States, home video game sales are worth $2 billion (equivalent to $6.47 billion adjusted for inflation).
- In Japan, home video game sales approach ¥400 billion (equivalent to $1.68 billion at the time, or $4.17 billion adjusted for inflation).

=== Highest-grossing arcade games ===
Pole Position, a racing game by Namco, was the most successful arcade game of 1983.

==== Japan ====
In Japan, Game Machine magazine began publishing half-monthly charts of top-grossing arcade games from June 1, 1983. The following titles were the top-grossing arcade video games on the Game Machine charts from June to December 1983.

Month	Table arcade cabinet		Upright/cockpit cabinet		Ref
Month	First half	Second half	First half	Second half	Ref
May	Champion Baseball		Astron Belt		
June	Champion Baseball		Astron Belt		
July	Champion Baseball		Astron Belt		
August	Champion Baseball	Elevator Action	Astron Belt		
September	Elevator Action		Ultra Quiz	Astron Belt	
October	Elevator Action		Pole Position	Star Wars	
November	Xevious	Joshi Volleyball	Laser Grand Prix	Pole Position II	
December	Exerion	Hyper Olympic	TX-1		

==== United States ====
In the United States, the following titles were the highest-grossing arcade games of 1983, according to RePlay magazine, the Amusement & Music Operators Association (AMOA), and Cash Box magazine.

Rank	RePlay	AMOA	Cash Box	Play Meter
1	Pole Position	Pole Position	Ms. Pac-Man, Pole Position	Dragon's Lair
2	Dragon's Lair, Mr. Do!	Bump 'n' Jump, Galaga, Ms. Pac-Man, Mr. Do!, Bagman, Nibbler, Buck Rogers: Planet of Zoom, Jungle King (Jungle Hunt); Donkey Kong, Joust, Time Pilot, Q*bert	Ms. Pac-Man, Pole Position	Unknown
3	Dragon's Lair, Mr. Do!	Bump 'n' Jump, Galaga, Ms. Pac-Man, Mr. Do!, Bagman, Nibbler, Buck Rogers: Planet of Zoom, Jungle King (Jungle Hunt); Donkey Kong, Joust, Time Pilot, Q*bert	Dragon's Lair	Unknown
4	Unknown	Bump 'n' Jump, Galaga, Ms. Pac-Man, Mr. Do!, Bagman, Nibbler, Buck Rogers: Planet of Zoom, Jungle King (Jungle Hunt); Donkey Kong, Joust, Time Pilot, Q*bert	Millipede	Unknown
5	Unknown	Bump 'n' Jump, Galaga, Ms. Pac-Man, Mr. Do!, Bagman, Nibbler, Buck Rogers: Planet of Zoom, Jungle King (Jungle Hunt); Donkey Kong, Joust, Time Pilot, Q*bert	—N/a	Unknown
6	Unknown	Bump 'n' Jump, Galaga, Ms. Pac-Man, Mr. Do!, Bagman, Nibbler, Buck Rogers: Planet of Zoom, Jungle King (Jungle Hunt); Donkey Kong, Joust, Time Pilot, Q*bert	—N/a	Unknown
7	Unknown	Bump 'n' Jump, Galaga, Ms. Pac-Man, Mr. Do!, Bagman, Nibbler, Buck Rogers: Planet of Zoom, Jungle King (Jungle Hunt); Donkey Kong, Joust, Time Pilot, Q*bert	—N/a	Unknown
8	Unknown	Bump 'n' Jump, Galaga, Ms. Pac-Man, Mr. Do!, Bagman, Nibbler, Buck Rogers: Planet of Zoom, Jungle King (Jungle Hunt); Donkey Kong, Joust, Time Pilot, Q*bert	—N/a	Unknown
9	Unknown	Bump 'n' Jump, Galaga, Ms. Pac-Man, Mr. Do!, Bagman, Nibbler, Buck Rogers: Planet of Zoom, Jungle King (Jungle Hunt); Donkey Kong, Joust, Time Pilot, Q*bert	—N/a	Unknown
10	Unknown	Bump 'n' Jump, Galaga, Ms. Pac-Man, Mr. Do!, Bagman, Nibbler, Buck Rogers: Planet of Zoom, Jungle King (Jungle Hunt); Donkey Kong, Joust, Time Pilot, Q*bert	—N/a	Unknown
11	Unknown	Bump 'n' Jump, Galaga, Ms. Pac-Man, Mr. Do!, Bagman, Nibbler, Buck Rogers: Planet of Zoom, Jungle King (Jungle Hunt); Donkey Kong, Joust, Time Pilot, Q*bert	—N/a	Unknown
12	Unknown	Bump 'n' Jump, Galaga, Ms. Pac-Man, Mr. Do!, Bagman, Nibbler, Buck Rogers: Planet of Zoom, Jungle King (Jungle Hunt); Donkey Kong, Joust, Time Pilot, Q*bert	—N/a	Unknown
13	Unknown	Bump 'n' Jump, Galaga, Ms. Pac-Man, Mr. Do!, Bagman, Nibbler, Buck Rogers: Planet of Zoom, Jungle King (Jungle Hunt); Donkey Kong, Joust, Time Pilot, Q*bert	—N/a	Unknown

=== Best-selling home video games ===
The following titles were the best-selling home video games of 1983.

Rank	Title	Platform	Publisher	Licensor	Release year	Genre	Sales	Ref
1	Ms. Pac-Man	Atari 2600	Atari, Inc.	Midway	1983	Maze	1,963,078	
2	Donkey Kong	ColecoVision	Coleco	Nintendo	1982	Platformer	1,500,000	
3	Centipede	Atari 2600	Atari, Inc.	—N/a	1983	Shoot 'em up	1,475,240	
4	Pitfall!	Atari 2600	Activision	—N/a	1982	Platformer	1,000,000+	
5	Pac-Man	Atari 2600	Atari, Inc.	Namco	1982	Maze	684,569	
6	Night Driver	Atari 2600	Atari, Inc.	—N/a	1980	Racing	580,959	
7	Space Invaders	Atari 2600	Atari, Inc.	Taito	1980	Shoot 'em up	435,353	
8	Warlords	Atari 2600	Atari, Inc.	—N/a	1981	Action	372,672	
9	Breakout	Atari 2600	Atari, Inc.	—N/a	1978	Block breaker	312,672	
10	Centipede	Atari 2600	Atari, Inc.	—N/a	1983	Shoot 'em up	100,499	

=== Best-selling home systems ===
Rank	System(s)	Manufacturer	Type	Generation	Sales	
Rank	System(s)	Manufacturer	Type	Generation	Japan	Worldwide
1	Game & Watch	Nintendo	Handheld	—N/a	—N/a	5,300,000
2	Atari 2600 (Atari VCS)	Atari, Inc.	Console	Second	—N/a	3,000,000
3	Commodore 64 (C64)	Commodore	Computer	8-bit	—N/a	2,000,000
4	ColecoVision	Coleco	Console	Second	—N/a	1,500,000
5	Family Computer (Famicom / NES)	Nintendo	Console	Third	1,000,000+	1,000,000+
6	IBM Personal Computer (IBM PC)	IBM	Computer	8-bit / 16-bit	—N/a	850,000
7	Intellivision	Mattel	Console	Second	—N/a	750,000
8	Atari 400 / Atari 800	Atari, Inc.	Computer	8-bit	—N/a	500,000
9	Apple II	Apple Inc.	Computer	8-bit	—N/a	420,000
10	NEC PC-88 / PC-98	NEC	Computer	8-bit / 16-bit	360,000	360,000+

== Major awards ==
Award	4th Arcade Awards (US)				Video Games Player Golden Joystick Awards (US)			Golden Joystick Awards (UK)
Award	Arcade	Console	Computer	Standalone	Arcade	Console	Computer	Computer
Game of the Year	Pole Position	Lady Bug	Lode Runner	Q*bert	Robotron: 2084	Pitfall!	Shamus	Jetpac
Game of the Year	Pole Position	Ms. Pac-Man	Lode Runner	Q*bert	Robotron: 2084	Pitfall!	Shamus	Jetpac
Best Arcade Adaptation	—N/a	Kangaroo	Frogger	—N/a	—N/a	Donkey Kong	Frogger	—N/a
Best Movie Adaptation	—N/a	—N/a	—N/a	—N/a	—N/a	Empire Strikes Back	—N/a	—N/a
Most Innovative Game	Q*bert	—N/a	Archon	—N/a	Astron Belt	Microsurgeon	Baseball	—N/a
Best Original Game	—N/a	—N/a	—N/a	—N/a	—N/a	—N/a	—N/a	Ah Diddums
Best Graphics	—N/a	—N/a	—N/a	—N/a	Pole Position	Zaxxon	Wayout	—N/a
Best Special Effects	—N/a	—N/a	—N/a	—N/a	SubRoc-3D	—N/a	—N/a	—N/a
Audio/Visual Effects	Dragon's Lair	Donkey Kong Jr.	—N/a	—N/a	—N/a	—N/a	—N/a	—N/a
Arcade-Style Game	—N/a	—N/a	—N/a	—N/a	—N/a	—N/a	—N/a	Manic Miner
Best Action Game	—N/a	River Raid	Centipede	—N/a	Centipede	Centipede	Crossfire	—N/a
Best Ladder Game	—N/a	—N/a	—N/a	—N/a	Donkey Kong	Donkey Kong	Miner 2049er	—N/a
Best Maze Game	—N/a	—N/a	—N/a	—N/a	—N/a	Ms. Pac-Man	Pac-Man	—N/a
Science Fiction/Fantasy	Xevious	Vanguard	—N/a	—N/a	—N/a	—N/a	—N/a	—N/a
Best Space Game	—N/a	—N/a	—N/a	—N/a	Buck Rogers	Demon Attack	Defender	—N/a
Best Adventure Game	—N/a	Advanced D&D	Witness	—N/a	—N/a	Dragonstomper	Zork	—N/a
Best Sports Game	—N/a			—N/a	—N/a		Soccer	—N/a
Strategy/War Game	—N/a			—N/a	—N/a		Legionnaire	The Hobbit
Best Mini-Arcade Game	—N/a			3-D Sky Attack	—N/a			—N/a
Best Software House	—N/a				—N/a			Ultimate Play the Game

== Events ==
- January – Electronic Games labels Donkey Kong, Space Panic, and other games with ladders as "climbing games."
- The fourth Arcade Awards are held, for games released during 1981–1982, with Tron winning best arcade game, Demon Attack best console game, David's Midnight Magic best computer game, and Galaxian best standalone game.
- A major shakeout of the North American video game industry ("the crash of 1983") begins. By 1986, total video games sales will decrease from US$3.2 billion to US$0.1 billion.
- December - Sente Technologies, a division of Pizza Time Theater, launches and demonstrates its first title Snake Pit.

== Business ==
- MCA Universal files suit against Nintendo, claiming that the latter company's video arcade hit Donkey Kong violated Universal's copyright on King Kong. After a brief trial, the judge determined that the rights to the original Kong had passed into the public domain. The case was dismissed, and MCA Universal paid US$1.8 million in damages to Nintendo.,
- Atari files suit against Coleco, claiming violation of Atari's patents on the Atari 2600 video game console. The previous year, Coleco released a peripheral device that made it possible for Atari 2600 game cartridges to be run on the ColecoVision console.
- Amusement Developing Section 8 (later known as Sega-AM2), a research and development department of Sega, is established under the supervision of Yu Suzuki in Tokyo, Japan.
- Milton Bradley takes over distribution of the Vectrex console after purchasing General Consumer Electronics.
- New companies: Aackosoft, Alligata, Beyond, Graftgold, Infogrames, Origin Systems, Interplay, Navarre, Mastertronic, Spectrum HoloByte, Tynesoft
- Defunct companies: Games by Apollo, U.S. Games, Xonox.

== Notable releases ==
=== Games ===
Arcade

- January – Namco releases Xevious.
- March – Sega releases Astron Belt in the Japanese market, the second laserdisc video game. It uses pre-rendered, computer-animated film footage as backdrops, overlaid with sprite graphics.
- May – Atari releases Star Wars, a color vector graphics game based on the popular film franchise.
- Konami releases Gyruss in Japan. Centuri distributes the game in North America.
- June 14 – Nintendo releases Mario Bros., which features the first appearance of Mario's brother, Luigi.
- June 19 – Cinematronics releases Advanced Microcomputer Systems's Dragon's Lair, the third laserdisc video game, and the first in the American market.
- June – Data East releases Bega's Battle, a laserdisc video game. It uses anime FMV cut scenes to develop a story between the game's shooting stages, which would later become the standard approach to video game storytelling.
- August – Sega releases Astron Belt in Europe, as the first laserdisc game in the region.
- September – Konami releases Track & Field.
- November – Sega releases Astron Belt in the United States.
- December – Namco releases Pole Position II, adding three additional tracks.
- Atari releases the trackball-controlled Crystal Castles.
- Bally/Midway releases Spy Hunter. They also release Jr. Pac-Man and quiz game Professor Pac-Man without Namco's authorization, and the latter is an immediate flop.
- Williams releases Blaster, which was originally programmed on an Atari 8-bit computer.

Personal computer

- June – Yuji Horii releases The Portopia Serial Murder Case for the NEC PC-6001 in Japan. It is an influential adventure game that lays the foundations for the visual novel genre.
- July 8 – Infocom releases Planetfall, which becomes one of their top sellers.
- August 23 – Origin Systems publishes Ultima III: Exodus, one of the first role-playing video games to use tactical, turn-based combat. It is released for the Apple II, Atari 8-bit computers, Commodore 64, and IBM PC.
- ASCII releases Bokosuka Wars for the Sharp X1 in Japan. It is a precursor to the tactical role-playing game and real-time strategy genres.
- Koei releases Nobunaga's Ambition for Japanese computers. Its combination of role-playing, turn-based grand strategy and management simulation elements sets a standard for the historical simulation and strategy RPG genres.
- Electronic Arts publishes its first five titles: Hard Hat Mack, Pinball Construction Set, Archon: The Light and the Dark, M.U.L.E., and Worms?.
- Bug-Byte releases Matthew Smith's Manic Miner, a platform game, for the ZX Spectrum.
- Ultimate Play the Game, later known as Rare, releases its first video games, Jetpac and Atic Atac, for the ZX Spectrum.
- Hudson Soft releases Bomberman for the MSX and FM-7.
- Psion releases Chequered Flag, the first driving game published for the ZX Spectrum, one of the first computer car simulators, and the first driving game with selectable cars.
- The 4-player simultaneous Dandy is released for the Atari 8-bit computers. It directly inspires 1985's Gauntlet arcade game.
- Muse Software releases a port of Castle Wolfenstein for the MS-DOS.

Console

- December 12 – Nintendo publishes Donkey Kong Jr. Math, for the Famicom.
- Mattel Electronics publishes World Series Baseball for the Intellivision, one of the first video games to use multiple camera angles.
- Activision's final big year of Atari 2600 releases includes Enduro, Decathlon, Keystone Kapers, Robot Tank, and Space Shuttle: A Journey into Space.

=== Hardware ===
Arcade

- May – Sega Laserdisc hardware releases, as the first laserdisc video game hardware.
- July – Sega System 1 releases, with Star Jacker game. Its graphics chips are later used in the Sega System 16 and Sega Space Harrier boards.
- December – Namco Libble Rabble (System 16 Universal) releases, as Namco's second arcade system board to use a 16-bit microprocessor.

Console

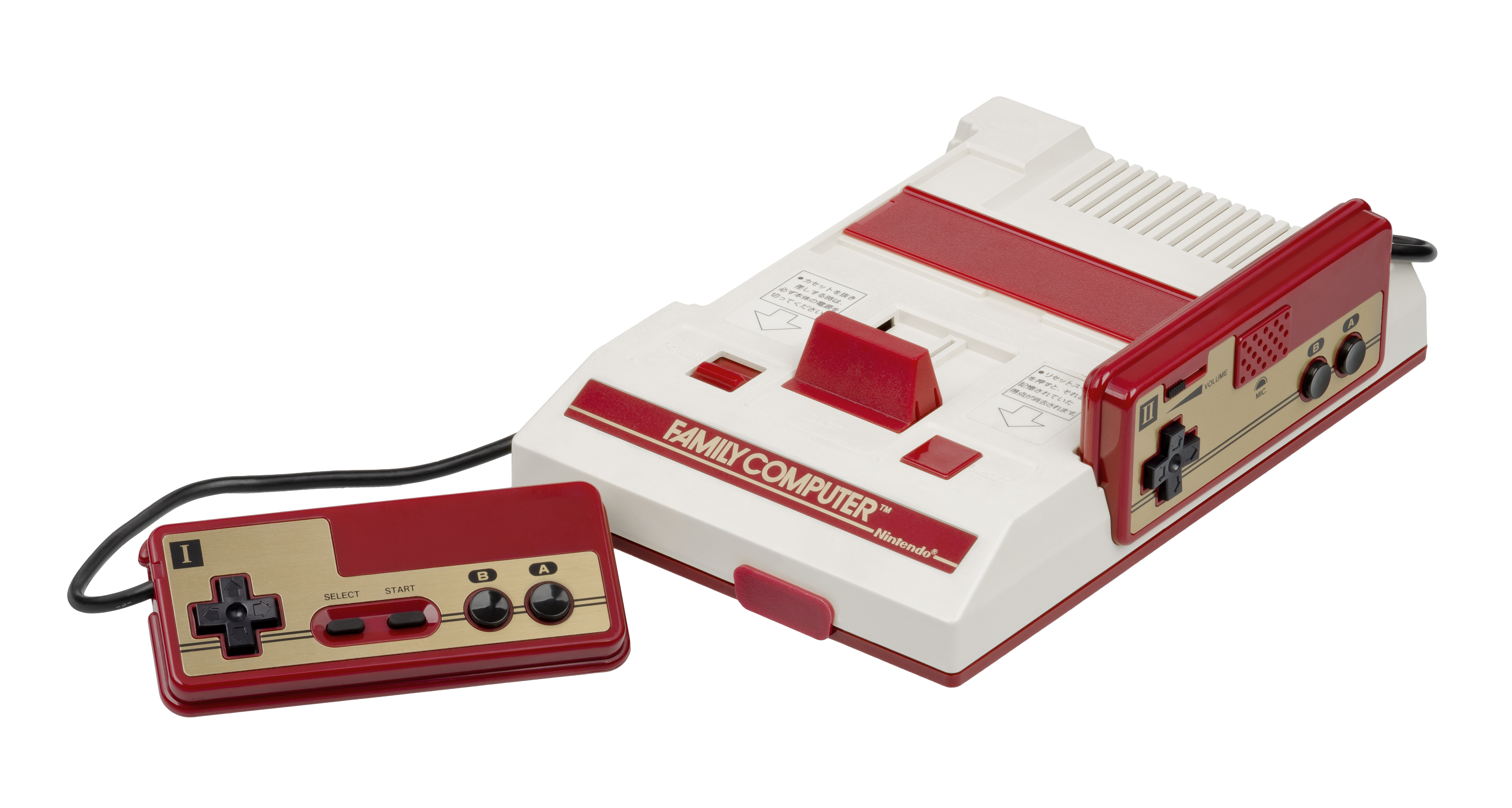
Family Computer

- July 15 – Sega releases the SG-1000 console in Japan, on the same day as the Famicom.
- July 15 – Nintendo releases the Family Computer (Famicom) console in Japan. Shortly after its release, complaints begin to surface about rampant system instability, prompting Nintendo to issue a product recall and to rerelease the machine with a new motherboard. It would later be released worldwide as the Nintendo Entertainment System (NES).
- October – Casio launches the Casio PV-1000 in Japan. It does not remain on the market for long.
- October – Gakken launches the Compact Vision TV Boy in Japan. It's the last second generation console released. It was expensive and obsolete at launch, being discontinued shortly after.
- GameLine, a combination modem and dialup game distribution service for the Atari 2600, is announced but never ships.

Personal computer

- January – Apple Computer releases the Apple IIe, which becomes their most popular 8-bit machine.
- June 16 – Microsoft Japan releases MSX, an early standardized home computer architecture.
- March – Atari releases the poorly received 1200XL computer. Late in the year it and the rest of the Atari 8-bit computer series are replaced by the 600XL and 800XL.
- June – Mattel Electronics releases the Aquarius home computer, originally designed by Radofin Electronics Far East.
- October – Coleco releases the Adam home computer. It is only on the market for 15 months.
- October – Mattel discontinues the Aquarius.
- Acorn Computers release the Acorn Electron, a cut down version of their BBC Micro to compete in the under £200 home computer market. Problems in manufacture see only 1 in 8 presales being delivered for the Christmas market.
- Sega releases the SC-3000, a personal computer version of the SG-1000 console, in Japan.

== Video game-based film and television releases ==
Title	Release / premiere date	Type	Distributor	Franchise	Original game publisher	Ref.
Saturday Supercade	September 17, 1983	Animated series	CBS Broadcasting, Inc.	Donkey Kong; Frogger; Q*bert; Pitfall!; Kangaroo; Space Ace	Nintendo; Konami; Hasbro Interactive; Activision; Sun Electronics; Atari, Inc.; Cinematronics	

== See also ==
- 1983 in games
