= List of SG-1000 games =

The SG-1000 had 75 games and 24 programs officially licensed from Sega. Additionally, there are 12 games and 19 programs released by John Sands Electronics.

== Sega SG-1000/SC-3000 series Cartridge Game List ==
Title	Developer	Publisher	JP	AUS	NZ
Borderline	Compile	Sega	March 1984	1984	1984
The Castle	Sega	Sega	1986	Unreleased	Unreleased
Champion Baseball	Sega	Sega	October 1983	1984	1984
Champion Boxing	Sega	Sega	October 1984 (Note: Also released as a Sega My Card for that region, although it would not come out as a Sega My Card until 1985.)	Unreleased (Note: This game was listed as a "Forthcoming Title" in this catalogue but ended up becoming unreleased.)	January 1985
Champion Golf	Sega	Sega	March 1984 (Note: Also released as a Sega My Card for that region, although it would not come out as a Sega My Card until 1985.)	June 1984	June 1984
Champion Pro Wrestling	Sega	Sega	March 1985	Unreleased	Unreleased
Champion Soccer	Sega	Sega	November 1984	Unreleased	Unreleased
Champion Tennis	Sega	Sega	August 1983	November 1983	November 1983
Congo Bongo	Sega	Sega	July 15, 1983	November 1983	November 1983
Exerion	Sega	Sega	March 1984	June 1984	June 1984
Flicky	Sega	Sega	December 1984	Unreleased	February 1985
Girl's Garden	Sega	Sega	January 1985	Unreleased	Unreleased
GP World	Sega	Sega	April 1985	Unreleased	Unreleased
Golgo 13	Sega	Sega	April 1984	Unreleased	Unreleased
Home Mahjong	Sega	Sega	December 1984	Unreleased	Unreleased
Hustle Chumy	Compile; Sega	Sega	November 1984	Unreleased	Unreleased
Hyper Sports	Sega	Sega	April 1985	Unreleased	Unreleased
Lode Runner	Sega	Sega	September 1984	Unreleased	January 1985
Loretta no Shōzō: Sherlock Holmes	Sega	Sega	February 18, 1987	Unreleased	Unreleased
Mahjong	Sega	Sega	July 15, 1983	Unreleased	Unreleased
Monaco GP	Sega	Sega	December 1983 (Note: Also released as a Sega My Card for that region, although it would not come out as a Sega My Card until 1985.)	1984	1984
N-Sub	Compile	Sega	July 15, 1983	November 1983	November 1983
Orguss	Sega	Sega	May 1984	October 1984	February 1985
Othello	Sega	Sega	July 1985	Unreleased	Unreleased
Pacar	Sega	Sega	November 1983	1984	1984
Pachinko	Sega	Sega	December 1983	Unreleased	Unreleased
Pachinko II	Sega	Sega	April 1984	Unreleased	Unreleased
Pop Flamer	Sega	Sega	November 1983	1984	1984
Safari Hunting	Compile	Sega	August 1983	November 1983	November 1983
Safari Race	Sega	Sega	July 1984	October 1984	January 1985
Sega Flipper; Video Flipper^{NZ}	Sega	Sega	October 1983	1984	1984
Sega-Galaga	Sega	Sega	November 1983	Unreleased	Unreleased
Serizawa Hachidan no Tsume Shōgi	Sega	Sega	July 15, 1983	Unreleased	Unreleased
Shinnyū Shain Tōru-kun	Sega	Sega	April 1985	Unreleased	Unreleased
Sindbad Mystery	Sega	Sega	January 1984	1984	1984
Space Invaders	Sega	Sega	June 1985	Unreleased	Unreleased
Space Slalom	Sega	Sega	December 1983	Unreleased	Unreleased
Star Force	Sega	Sega	May 1985 (Note: Also released as Sega My Card for that region.)	Unreleased	Unreleased
Star Jacker	Sega	Sega	July 15, 1983	November 1983	November 1983
Uranai Angel Cutie	Sega	Sega	December 1984	Unreleased	Unreleased
Yamato	Sega	Sega	July 15, 1983	November 1983	November 1983
Zaxxon	Sega	Sega	February 1985	Unreleased	Unreleased
Zippy Race	Sega	Sega	March 1984 (Note: Also released as a Sega My Card for that region, although it would not come out as a Sega My Card until 1985.)	Unreleased	Unreleased

Othello Multivision Cartridge List

The Othello Multivision is a licensed variant of the SG-1000 console, manufactured by Tsukuda Original and fully compatible with the SG-1000, and was released only in Japan. The console comes with a copy of the game Othello (which is not to be confused with the earlier listed title which differs from the 1985 cartridge title Sega did) built into the unit, and eight additional titles were released by Tsukuda Original.

Title	Developer	Publisher	JP
007 James Bond	Tsukuda Original	Tsukuda Original	December 1984
Challenge Derby	Tsukuda Original	Tsukuda Original	June 1984
Guzzler	Tsukuda Original	Tsukuda Original	October 1983
Okamoto Ayako no Match Play Golf	Tsukuda Original	Tsukuda Original	July 1984
Q*bert	Tsukuda Original	Tsukuda Original	October 1983
Sannin Mahjong	Tsukuda Original	Tsukuda Original	May 1984
Space Armor	Tsukuda Original	Tsukuda Original	December 1984
Space Mountain	Tsukuda Original	Tsukuda Original	May 1984

== Sega SG-1000/SC-3000 series My Card Game List ==
The Sega Card Catcher is an adapter used to run card software distributed on Sega's My Card format. Since neither the SG-1000/SC-3000 nor the Mark II have a card slot, the Card Catcher is required for using My Cards on these systems. However, a card slot is built into the SEGA Mark III/Master System, making the adapter unnecessary for that system.

Title	Developer	Publisher	JP
Bank Panic	Sega	Sega	September 1985
The Black Onyx	Sega	Sega	1987
Bomb Jack	Sega	Sega	December 1985
C-So!	Compile	Sega	February 1986
Chack'n Pop	Sega	Sega	September 1985
Champion Billiards	Compile	Sega	1986
Champion Boxing	Sega	Sega	1985
Champion Golf	Sega	Sega	1985
Champion Ice Hockey	Sega	Sega	December 1985
Champion Kendo	Sega	Sega	April 1986
Championship Lode Runner	Compile	Sega	December 1985
Choplifter	Compile	Sega	July 1985
Doki Doki Penguin Land	Sega	Sega	July 1985
Dragon Wang	Sega	Sega	July 1985
Drol	Sega	Sega	October 1985
Elevator Action	Sega	Sega	November 1985
Gulkave	Compile	Sega	1986
Hang-On II	Sega	Sega	December 1985
H.E.R.O.	Sega	Sega	December 1985
Monaco GP	Sega	Sega	1985
Ninja Princess	Sega	Sega	February 1986
Pitfall II: The Lost Caverns	Sega	Sega	July 1985
Rock n' Bolt	Sega	Sega	November 1985
Sokoban	Sega	Sega	December 1985
Star Force	Sega	Sega	1985
Super Tank	Sega	Sega	1986
Wonder Boy	Sega	Sega	1986
Zippy Race	Sega	Sega	1985
Zoom 909	Sega	Sega	July 1985

== Sega CAI Software (for SC-3000 series or SG-1000 series + SK-1100) ==
Title	Developer	Publisher	Released
Chuugaku Hisshuu Eibunpou (Chuugaku 1-Nen)	Sega	Sega	1983
Chuugaku Hisshuu Eibunpou (Chuugaku 2-Nen)	Sega	Sega	1983
Chuugaku Hisshuu Eisakubun (Chuugaku 1-Nen)	Sega	Sega	1983
Chuugaku Hisshuu Eisakubun (Chuugaku 2-Nen)	Sega	Sega	1983
Chuugaku Hisshuu Eitango (Chuugaku 1-Nen)	Sega	Sega	1983
Chuugaku Hisshuu Eitango (Chuugaku 2-Nen)	Sega	Sega	1983
Kagaku (Gensokigou Master)	Sega	Sega	1983
Music	Mitec	Sega	1983
Nihonshi Nenpyou	Sega	Sega	1983
Sekaishi Nenpyou (Monbushou Shidouyouryou Junkyo)	Sega	Sega	1983
Tanoshī Sansū (Shōgaku 4-Nensei-jō)	Sega	Sega	1983
Tanoshī Sansū (Shōgaku 4-Nensei-ka)	Sega	Sega	1984
Tanoshī Sansū (Shōgaku 5-Nensei-jō)	Sega	Sega	1984
Tanoshī Sansū (Shōgaku 5-Nensei-ka)	Sega	Sega	1984
Tanoshī Sansū (Shōgaku 6-Nensei-jō)	Sega	Sega	1984
Tanoshī Sansū (Shōgaku 6-Nensei-ka)	Sega	Sega	1984

BASIC cartridge

Title	Developer	Publisher	Released
BASIC Level II A	Mitech	Sega	1983
BASIC Level II B	Mitech	Sega	1983
BASIC Level III A	Mitech	Sega	1983
BASIC Level III B	Mitech	Sega	1983
BASIC SK-III	Mitech	Sega	1983
Home BASIC	Mitech	Sega	1985
Home BASIC Level II B	Mitech	Sega	1985

Other

Title	Developer	Publisher	JP
TV Oekaki	Sega	Sega	1985

The drawing/painting program TV Oekaki (Eng. trans.: "TV Doodler" or "TV Scribbler") uses a drawing tablet that connects directly to the cartridge.

John Sands Electronics SC-3000 Cassettes List

Title	Developer	Publisher	AUS	NZ
Addition Tutor	John Sands Electronics	John Sands Electronics	1983	1984
Alpha Alphabet	Wayne G. Richmond	John Sands Electronics	1984	Unreleased
Australian General Knowledge Tutor	John Sands Electronics	John Sands Electronics	1984	Unreleased
Australian Geography Tutor	John Sands Electronics	John Sands Electronics	1983	Unreleased
Blackjack	John Sands Electronics	John Sands Electronics	August 1984	Unreleased
Demon Division	Pyramid Software	John Sands Electronics	1983	Unreleased
Division Tutor	John Sands Electronics	John Sands Electronics	1983	Unreleased
Dragonquest	Hercules Gunter	John Sands Electronics	July 1984	Unreleased
Environoid	John Sands Electronics	John Sands Electronics	1984	Unreleased
Flashword 1	John Sands Electronics	John Sands Electronics	1984	Unreleased
Flashword 2	John Sands Electronics	John Sands Electronics	1984	Unreleased
Heroic Quest	John Sands Electronics	John Sands Electronics	1984	Unreleased
Ice Cream Stall	Pyramid Software	John Sands Electronics	August 1984	Unreleased
Keyboard Learning Program	John Sands Electronics	John Sands Electronics	1983	Unreleased
Learning the Alphabet	John Sands Electronics	John Sands Electronics	1984	1984
Learning to Count	John Sands Electronics	John Sands Electronics	1984	1984
Marauding Multiplication	Pyramid Software	John Sands Electronics	1984	Unreleased
Metric Mentals	Wayne G. Richmond	John Sands Electronics	1984	Unreleased
Multiplication Tutor	John Sands Electronics	John Sands Electronics	1984	1984
Reverso	Gold Record Software	John Sands Electronics	August 1984	Unreleased
Roman Numbers-Up	Wayne G. Richmond	John Sands Electronics	1984	Unreleased
Satellite Subtraction	Pyramid Software	John Sands Electronics	1984	Unreleased
Solar Conquest	Programming Concepts	John Sands Electronics	July 1984	Unreleased
Spelling Tutor	John Sands Electronics	John Sands Electronics	1983	1984
Spellomatic 1	Wayne G. Richmond	John Sands Electronics	1984	Unreleased
Spellomatic 2	Wayne G. Richmond	John Sands Electronics	1984	Unreleased
Subtraction Tutor	John Sands Electronics	John Sands Electronics	1983	1984
Tank Addition	Pyramid Software	John Sands Electronics	1984	Unreleased
Watch Me Draw	John Sands Electronics	John Sands Electronics	1984	1984
Whiz Kid Mental Arithmetic	Wayne G. Richmond	John Sands Electronics	1984	Unreleased
Word Block	Creative Print Ideas	John Sands Electronics	August 1984	Unreleased
