= Space Age Whiz Kids =

Single by Joe Walsh

from the album You Bought It – You Name It
- Released: 1983
- Recorded: 1982
- Genre: Rock; new wave
- Length: 3:40
- Label: Warner Bros.; Full Moon
- Songwriters: Joe Vitale; Joe Walsh
- Producer: Bill Szymczyk

Joe Walsh singles chronology
"The Waffle Stomp" (1982)	"Space Age Whiz Kids" (1983)	"I Can Play That Rock & Roll" (1983)

Official audio
- "Space Age Whiz Kids" on YouTube

Space Age Whiz Kids is a song by American rock musician Joe Walsh, and guitarist for the Eagles. It was released as a lead single from his sixth studio solo album, You Bought It – You Name It, being Walsh's eleventh single.

== Meaning ==
The song was written during the 1980s video arcade craze, and its lyrics are a personal commentary, critical of then-modern American culture against Walsh's older pinball and pool generation. The lyrics also reflect a satirical view on this, with lines such as: "I feel a little bit mixed up, maybe I'm obsolete". The lyrics also name drop both Donkey Kong and Pac-Man along with Klingons from the Star Trek Series.

== Promotional video ==
The music video starts out in an old-fashioned arcade in black and white. Walsh, pushes his way up to a pinball machine. The video then turns to color - depicting him in the present, surrounded by video games instead of pinball machines, Walsh tries to talk to the kids sitting around but they ignore him. They than show the old pinball arcade and how everyone is covered with cobwebs. There are then scenes of Walsh and his band with Walsh dressed in a jumpsuit with sunglasses and a backwards plastic face mask with a feather on the side of the headband. He and his band are on a Quarter platform dated 1983 with shots of the games and the futurist arcade itself. Towards the end, Walsh walks through the futuristic arcade in a full-blown space suit tossing quarters around to the kids, With Joe Vitale (who co-wrote the song) chanting "I like Space Age Whiz Kids" on a floating video game screen that flies around the arcade. The closing shot is of a video game entitled "Whiz Kids". The music video features shots of different arcade cabinets and footage of the arcade games, the cabinets featured are Wacko (1983), Time Pilot (1982), Kangaroo (1982), Jungle King (1982), and Tempest (1981). The games with gameplay footage are Pac-Man (1980), Defender (1981), Liberator (1982), Front Line (1982), and Donkey Kong (1981). Towards the end of the video, Walsh can be seen wearing a hat that says ILBT which is the title of the song I.L.B.T.s from the same album.

== Track listing ==
7" Single (Warner Bros. Records – 7-29611, Warner Bros. Records – 9 29611-7, Full Moon – 7-29611, Full Moon – 9 29611-7)

A "Space Age Whiz Kids" – 3:40
B "Theme from Island Weirdos" – 3:13

== Chart performance ==
"Space Age Whiz Kids" peaked at #52 on the US, Hot 100
