= Mega Zone (disambiguation) =

Mega Zone may refer to:

- Mega Zone (video game)
- MegaZone, a video game magazine
- Megazone 23, an anime
