= Angler Dangler =

1982 fishing arcade video game

- Developer: Data East
- Publishers: Data East (arcade), Takara (PC-6001)
- Platforms: Arcade, PC-6001
- Release: Arcade: 1982; PC-6001: 1983 (Japan)
- Genre: Sports
- Modes: Single-player, alternating multiplayer
- Arcade system: DECO Cassette System

Angler Dangler is a fishing-themed arcade video game developed and published by Data East in 1982. Released for the company's DECO Cassette System, the game departs from the action-oriented gameplay of most contemporary arcade titles by simulating recreational fishing, requiring players to cast lines, hook fish, and reel them in while avoiding obstacles and broken tackle.

The game was released in Japan under the title Fishing.

== Gameplay ==
Angler Dangler is a sports game based on fishing. Players control a fisherman positioned along the shoreline and attempt to catch as many fish as possible before time expires. Using an eight-way joystick and two buttons, players choose where to cast their line and regulate the strength of the cast. Fish move through the water, and players must place their bait in promising locations to attract them. Once a fish is hooked, the player reels it in while managing line tension. Reeling too aggressively can cause the fishing line to snap. The game also includes underwater hazards such as rocks, which can damage tackle and cause players to lose hooks. The game ends if the player exhausts their supply of hooks or runs out of time.

== Development and release ==
Angler Dangler was released in 1982 by Data East and ran on the company's cassette-based arcade platform, the DECO Cassette System. Unlike many of Data East's better-known arcade releases of the period, such as BurgerTime, Lock 'n' Chase, and Bump 'n' Jump, Angler Dangler focused on a non-violent sporting theme. The game utilized a vertically oriented raster display and was distributed in both upright and cocktail cabinet formats.

Following the arcade release, Angler Dangler was ported to the PC-6001 and released in Japan in 1983 by Takara under its Phoenix publishing label.

== Reception ==
The game was overshadowed by more commercially successful arcade releases of the early 1980s, both within Data East's catalog and the broader arcade industry.

Retrospective descriptions have highlighted its unusual subject matter and simulation-oriented gameplay. Modern game databases classify the title as a fishing sports game and note its distinctive emphasis on casting accuracy, line management, and patience rather than reflex-driven arcade action.

The game is considered relatively uncommon among surviving DECO Cassette titles. The International Arcade Museum's preservation census reports few surviving examples and limited ownership among arcade collectors.

== Legacy ==
Angler Dangler remains notable as an early attempt to adapt recreational fishing into an arcade format. The game has been preserved through arcade emulation projects and is supported by MAME, allowing modern players to play one of the more unusual titles released for the DECO Cassette System.

== See also ==
- List of Data East games
