= Radical Radial =

1982 video game

- Arcade flyer
- Developer: Logitec
- Publisher: Nichibutsu
- Platform: Arcade
- Release: NA: June 1982; JP: October 1982
- Genre: Top-down shooter
- Modes: Single-player, multiplayer

Radical Radial (Note: Japanese: ラジカルラジアル, Hepburn: Rajikaru Rajiaru) is a 1982 top-down shooter video game developed by Logitec and published by Nichibutsu for arcades. It was released in North America in June 1982 and Japan in October 1982. Hamster Corporation acquired the game's rights alongside Nichibutsu's intellectual property; they released the game as part of their Arcade Archives series for the Nintendo Switch and PlayStation 4 in May 2020.

== Gameplay ==
In the game, the player controls an anthropomorphic wheel who must navigate numerous levels while collecting points and defeating enemies. Levels are designed similarly to Irem's MotoRace USA, where obstacles, harsh terrain with tight walls or gaps, as well as invincible enemy vehicles are in the way. The wheel can jump over various obstacles, move left and right or adjust speed to avoid them; the latter is necessary as enemy vehicles can move and sabotage the wheel's landing. The wheel is equipped with ammunition to shoot down alien enemies.
