= Swimmer (video game) =

1982 video game

- North American arcade flyer
- Developer: Tehkan
- Publishers: JP: Tehkan; NA: Centuri
- Platform: Arcade
- Release: JP: July 1982; NA: November 1982
- Genre: Action
- Modes: Single-player, multiplayer

Swimmer (Note: Japanese: スイマ一, Hepburn: Suima) is a 1982 action video game developed and published by Tehkan for arcades. It was released in Japan in July 1982 and North America by Centuri in November 1982.

== Gameplay ==
The swimmer, right of center, surrounded by logs. The cherries on the left give points when collected.

The player swims through a vertically scrolling level while collecting floating fruit for points and power-ups to knock enemies out. In an inversion of the gameplay of Konami's Frogger, players can swim from side to side to avoid obstacles, or they can press a button to dive under them. The goal is to swim until the character reaches the treasure island.

== Legacy ==
In 2005, Swimmer was re-released for the Xbox as part of the Tecmo Classic Arcade collection. Hamster Corporation released the game as part of their Arcade Archives series for the Nintendo Switch and PlayStation 4 in March 2021, as well as their Arcade Archives 2 series for the Nintendo Switch 2, PlayStation 5 and Xbox Series X/S in October 2026.

== See also ==
- River Patrol
- Toobin'
