= RB5X =

RB5X in the Computer History Museum

The RB5X is a personal robot manufactured by RB Robot Corporation of Golden, Colorado.

A cylinder-shaped robot with an optional arm, and a transparent, dome-shaped top, RB5X has an RS-232 communications interface and is programmable in TinyBASIC or Savvy. It was first released circa 1983. Its inputs include eight bumper panels, a photodiode and a sonic transducer. The robot learns from experience.

The RB5X was an early commercial implementation of the concept of autonomous mobile robotics (AMR) proposed and demonstrated by author/inventor, David L. Heiserman in 1976.
