= Marvin's Maze =

1983 video game

- Developer: SNK
- Publisher: SNK
- Platform: Arcade
- Release: October 1983
- Genre: Maze
- Modes: Single-player, multiplayer

Marvin's Maze is a maze video game developed and published by SNK for arcades in 1983. The player guides Marvin through two-tiered mazes while avoiding robotic enemies called Robonoids. Stages can be completed either by collecting all the dots or by destroying a specified number of enemies, using laser shots and movable sections of the maze.

The game was later re-released on the PlayStation Network as a PlayStation Minis title in 2011. Retrospective reviews praised its variations on the maze-chase formula but also criticised aspects of its difficulty and repetition.

== Gameplay ==
The player controls Marvin in a maze occupied by pursuing Robonoids. Each stage contains regular dots and larger power dots; collecting all the dots or destroying the required number of Robonoids advances play to the next stage. The maze has two levels, with passages at its four corners allowing Marvin to travel between them. Collecting a power dot gives Marvin a single laser shot, which can destroy multiple Robonoids if they are lined up in its path. Movable junctions alter the maze's layout and can separate Marvin from pursuing enemies. They can also make Robonoids fall into a pit, a manoeuvre known as a "trick". Robonoids become faster as play progresses. Travelling between the maze's levels can provide an escape, although Marvin may emerge near another enemy. The PlayStation Minis version also supports two-player hotseat play, in which players take turns and compare scores.

== Development ==
SNK developed and published Marvin's Maze, releasing the arcade game in October 1983. SNK Electronics also issued a conversion-kit instruction manual for the game, documenting circuit-board layouts, ROM locations and schematics. The manual describes operator-selectable settings for the number of lives, coin-to-play ratios, bonus-life thresholds, attract-mode music and table-cabinet operation.

== Reception ==
A review in the February 2013 issue of PlayStation Official Magazine – UK, reproduced by Metacritic, was more reserved, describing the game as occasionally frustrating and repetitive.

== Legacy ==
Marvin's Maze returned as a PlayStation Minis release in 2011, alongside other older SNK games. Sony's July 2011 PlayStation Plus announcement listed it among the SNK Minis offered at a discount from 19 July, together with titles including Ikari Warriors, Ozma Wars and Vanguard. The re-release retained the arcade game's early-1980s visuals and sound effects, as well as turn-based two-player play.
