= Tazz-Mania =

1982 video game

- Arcade flyer
- Developer: Stern Electronics
- Publisher: Stern Electronics
- Platform: Arcade
- Release: NA: June 1982
- Genre: Multidirectional shooter
- Modes: Single-player, multiplayer

Tazz-Mania is a 1982 multidirectional shooter video game developed and published by Stern Electronics for arcades. It was released in North America in June 1982. It is a follow-up to Berzerk and Frenzy.

In 2023, Atari SA acquired the rights to twelve Stern Electronics video games including Tazz-Mania.

== Gameplay ==
The player character must navigate through various rooms while defeating the enemies in each room with ammunition and bombs that clear the screen of enemies. Unlike Berzerk and Frenzy, the maze format is eschewed in favor of open-ended rooms, whose walls close in on the player until the player defeats all enemies. A bonus room is available every three rooms, where players can stock up on bombs and gain extra points. The game ends when the player dies.
