= Cosmic Chasm =

1983 video game

- Vectrex box art
- Developer: Cinematronics
- Publisher: Cinematronics
- Platforms: Vectrex, arcade
- Release: Vectrex: NA: February 1983; EU: 1983; Arcade: NA: April 1983
- Genre: Shooter
- Modes: Single-player, multiplayer

Cosmic Chasm is a 1983 vector game originally created by GCE for the Vectrex home game system. It became the first game developed for a home system to be turned into an arcade game after Cinematronics, which was in Chapter 11 bankruptcy at the time, released it as their last color vector game.

== Gameplay ==
The player controls a spaceship armed with lasers and shields on a mission to destroy the Cosmic Chasm space station from the inside out. Each room of the space station has protector ships that attack the player directly and a center that slowly expands, forcing the player not to linger in the room for too long after defeating the protector ships. The player must shoot away forcefields that protect the exits in order to traverse the corridors that lead to other rooms. Each exit corresponds to a different direction on the map, and the player must choose the shortest route. The player must fight their way to the station's reactor room, destroy it and escape the station before it explodes. Touching the walls of the rooms is just as fatal as touching a protector ship or the expanding center. The screen has a map portion on top so that the player can keep track of which room of the station they are in and plan their escape. The home game is basically the same in terms of gameplay, but has some noticeable differences from the arcade version.

=== Vectrex version differences ===
In the Vectrex version, the player controls a drilling vehicle that not only has lasers and shields, but a drilling tip that must be used to penetrate and nullify the forcefields blocking the exits. The rooms still have the protector ships, expanding center cores and in the one room; a reactor. The Vectrex version also has a map, but it is not permanently displayed at the top of the screen like the arcade version. It is a separate screen that appears before each round of play begins or when the player exits a room. In order to destroy the reactor, the player must back their vehicle close to the reactor and drop a bomb which will explode after a preset time period, allowing the player to escape. Finally, since this is a Vectrex game, it only features a monochrome vector display.
