= Lost Tomb =

1983 video game

- Arcade flyer
- Developer: Stern Electronics
- Publishers: Stern Electronics; Datasoft (home)
- Designer: Dan Lee
- Programmers: Arcade; Dan Lee; Apple II; Larry Lewis; Atari 8-bit Bruce Adelstein; Commodore 64; Mark Brodie; Troy Lyndon; Robert Bobbio; IBM PC; Larry Lewis
- Artist: Whitney Caughlan (C64)
- Platforms: Arcade, Apple II, Atari 8-bit, Commodore 64, IBM PC
- Release: 1983
- Genre: Multidirectional shooter
- Modes: Single-player, multiplayer
- Arcade system: Konami Scramble

Lost Tomb is a 1983 twin-stick shooter video game developed and published by Stern Electronics for arcades. Armed with a gun and single-use whips, the player uses dual joysticks to explore the chambers of a South American pyramid looking for treasure and fighting mummies, spiders, and scorpions. The game was Stern's first arcade conversion kit and was intended for use with earlier machines from the company such as Scramble. Lost Tomb contains microtransactions: at specific points in the game, 25 additional whips can be purchased by inserting a coin.

In 1984, Datasoft published home conversions for Apple II, Atari 8-bit computers, Commodore 64, and a self-booting disk for IBM PC compatibles. Additional whips can be purchased for points instead of real money.

Atari SA acquired the rights to Lost Tomb in 2023.

== Gameplay ==
The player moves through the rooms of the tomb, from the top of the pyramid to the base, collecting treasure and looking for the exit. There are 92 rooms spread across the 13 levels of the pyramid. Scorpions, mummies, and spiders attack the player and can be shot. Each room has a time limit which, when reached, triggers an "earthquake" where the walls emit bullets.

One joystick moves the explorer and the other fires the gun in a twin-stick shooter control mechanism. A button swings the whip, which destroys nearby enemies and walls. Both bullets and whips are limited. Chests contain keys and additional bullets and whips. They also stop the effects of an earthquake.

After exiting a room, a map showing the levels of the pyramid and connecting stairways is displayed. Some rooms lead to a hallway, viewed from the side, where the player must run for the entrance of the next room while being attacked by bats. Every fifth room is a "throne room", which can be exited by finding a key in a chest.

An in-app purchase screen is sometimes shown between levels, giving 25 whips if the player inserts a quarter. In the home versions the price is 2500 points. The maximum number of whips that the player can have is 99.

== Reception ==
In 1983, Video Games magazine called Lost Tomb, "the best Raiders of the Lost Ark-inspired game so far to hit the scene." The reviewer also commented, "the graphics are a bit murky" and "the play is overly complex for most novice arcade enthusiasts."

== Legacy ==
Lost Tomb is the first video game allowing a mid-game purchase by the player for real money–what would later be called a microtransaction or in-app purchase. The earlier Gorf (1981) allows buying two additional lives for a quarter, which can be done twice for a total of seven lives. Fantasy (1981) is the first video game that can be continued, after the player loses all lives, for the cost of a new game. These purchase points are before play begins and after it ends, while the opportunity to buy more whips in Lost Tomb is during a break in the game.

Dan Lee later wrote the arcade video game Agent Super Bond, released in 1985 by Signatron USA. It has a similar overhead view and visuals as Lost Tomb, but with a secret agent theme.

In 2023, Atari SA acquired the rights to twelve Stern Electronics video games including Lost Tomb.
