= The Pit (video game) =

1982 video game

- Developer: AW Electronics
- Publishers: UK: Zilec; JP: Taito; NA: Centuri
- Designers: Andy Walker; Tony Gibson
- Platforms: Arcade, Commodore 64, VIC-20
- Release: Arcade: WW: April 1982; Commodore 64: UK: 1983; VIC-20: UK: 1984
- Genre: Action
- Modes: Single-player, multiplayer

The Pit is an arcade video game released in 1982 by Zilec in the United Kingdom and licensed to Centuri in North America and Taito in Japan. The game was designed by Andy Walker and Tony Gibson and developed by AW Electronics. The objective of The Pit is to descend into an underground labyrinth, retrieve a gem, and escape. A handheld version was released in 1983 as both FL Exploration of Space Zackman: The Pit and Zackman, Tandy Space Explorer.

An unpublished game based on The Pit, programmed by Chris Gray, directly inspired Boulder Dash.

== Gameplay ==
Arcade screenshot

The player's avatar (described as "The Astronaut-Explorer" by the game manual) lands in a spaceship and must dig his way into a series of tunnels. While there, he must avoid being crushed by rocks, eaten by monsters, impaled by arrows, or melted in a vat of acid. In lieu of a traditional timer is a tank (the "Zonker") shooting away a mountain near the player's spaceship. If the player dallies too long in the maze, the Zonker will destroy the player's spaceship, and the player loses a life.

After collecting the treasure, the only route back to the spaceship is by crossing "The Pit", which is a room with a sliding retractable floor underneath which is a monster that will devour a player who tarries too long.

The player receives 200 points for shooting each enemy, 1000 points for each crystal collected, 2000 points for collecting buried treasure, and 1000 points for crossing "The Pit" safely and reboarding the ship.

== Release ==
The Pit was released in April 1982. A sub-genre of action games with digging mechanics was emerging at the time. Namco's Dig Dug was released in March 1982 in Japan, just a month before The Pit released, with Dig Dug releasing internationally the same month in April 1982. This led to some controversy, with Dig Dug's US distributor Atari, Inc. threatening legal action, but Centuri registered their US copyright for The Pit three weeks earlier than Atari did for Dig Dug. The Pit designer Andy Walker claimed he demonstrated a prototype of The Pit at a trade show where it was seen by some Japanese people who may have been from Namco or Atari.

== Ports ==
The tank is labeled "Zilec" in the U.K. version, and "Taito" in the Japanese version. In addition, the game map layout as well as the color palette differ between the regional versions. The game was ported from the original 6502 processor board to Centuri's Z80 board in 1982.

A port for the Commodore 64 was published in 1983 and one for the VIC-20 in 1984. Bandai released a portable VFD handheld version of The Pit in 1983 as FL Exploration of Space Zackman: The Pit. It was also sold by Tandy in the US and some European countries as Zackman, Tandy Space Explorer.

== Legacy ==
Chris Gray programmed a game based on The Pit in BASIC for the Atari 8-bit computers. He submitted it to InHome Software as Pit-Fall. InHome liked the concept but didn't think the game was of commercial quality. They gave it to Peter Liepa, who expanded and rewrote it, and it was released by First Star Software as Boulder Dash in 1984.

An unofficial conversion of The Pit for the ZX Spectrum was programmed by Dave Tansley. The same author also implementyed The Pit Jr. for the Pico 8 fantasy video game console.

== See also ==
- Borderline (1981)
