= Munch Mobile =

1983 video game

- Arcade flyer
- Developer: SNK
- Publishers: JP: SNK; NA: Centuri
- Platforms: Arcade, TI-99/4A
- Release: JP: January 1983; NA: March 1983
- Genre: Racing
- Modes: Single-player, multiplayer

Munch Mobile, is a driving video game developed and published by SNK for arcades. It was released in Japan as Joyful Road (Note: Japanese: ジョイフルロード, Hepburn: Joifuru Rōdo) in January 1983. The North American version was released by Centuri in March 1983. The player controls an anthropomorphic car that uses extending arms to grab items from alongside the road. In 1984, Texas Instruments published a version for its TI-99/4A home computer.

Hamster Corporation released the game as part of their Arcade Archives series for the Nintendo Switch and PlayStation 4, as well as their Arcade Archives 2 series for the PlayStation 5 and Xbox Series X/S in October 2025.

== Gameplay ==
The game is viewed from a top-down perspective and automatically scrolls forward. The goal is to reach a house at the end of the road and park in the attached garage; the otherwise unseen driver of the car reunites with the occupant of the house.

The player drives a car with a large hand attached that is used to collect objects to the left and right of the road. The left 8-way stick steers the car and the right two-way stick controls the hands. Fruits, fish, and bags of money give points and gas containers provide more fuel. Extra points are awarded for disposing of the inedible remains of food into trash cans. Trees and other obstacles injure the hand, making it temporarily unusable. Lives are lost if the player runs out of fuel or collides with the side of the road or other cars.
