= Juno First =

1983 video game

- Arcade flyer
- Developer: Konami
- Publishers: Arcade: JP: Konami; NA: Mylstar Electronics; MSX; Sony; Atari 8-bit, C64, IBM PC; Datasoft
- Platforms: Arcade, MSX, Commodore 64, Atari 8-bit, IBM PC
- Release: Arcade: JP: July 1983; NA: September 1983; MSX: JP: 1983; EU: 1983; Commodore 64: July 1984; Atari 8-bit, IBM PC: Mid-1984
- Genre: Scrolling shooter
- Modes: Single-player, multiplayer

Juno First (Note: Japanese: ジュノファースト, Hepburn: Juno Fāsuto) is a 1983 vertically scrolling shooter video game developed and published by Konami for arcades. It was released in Japan in July 1983 and in North America by Mylstar Electronics in September 1983. The game is a shooter with a slightly tilted perspective, similar to Nintendo's 1980 game Radar Scope. The game was ported to the MSX, Commodore 64, Atari 8-bit computers, and IBM PC.

== Gameplay ==
Juno First presents a set number of enemies per level, but they do not make a gallery formation like Galaga or Space Invaders. Instead, the player's ship can move forward and backward (in addition to left and right) to hunt enemies in an orientation that is vertical, but has some horizon-oriented tilt. This style of gameplay would be re-used in a later Konami shooter, Axelay.

The player destroys waves of enemies to finish levels. Starting formations vary from stage to stage. In addition, the player can pick up a humanoid, upon which the screen will have a red tint. While this happens, every enemy the player shoots will earn the player 200 more points than the previous enemy destroyed. The original score for shooting an enemy while in humanoid mode depends on the stage.

== Ports ==
Juno First was first ported in the western market to the Commodore 64, Atari 8-bit computers, and IBM PC in 1984. All of these ports were handled by Datasoft. The Commodore and Atari ports were programmed by Greg Hiscott, while the IBM version was programmed by Scott Titus.

In Japan, Sony released a conversion of Juno First in 1983 for MSX computers. This version soon made its way to other MSX markets as well.

Juno First was included via Microsoft's Game Room service for the Xbox 360 and Windows on June 30, 2010. Hamster Corporation released the game as part of their Arcade Archives series for the Nintendo Switch and PlayStation 4 on March 13, 2025.
