= Wild Western =

1982 video game

- North American arcade flyer
- Developer: Taito
- Publisher: Taito
- Platforms: Arcade, Fujitsu FM-7, NEC PC-8801, Sharp MZ-80, Sharp MZ-2500, Sharp X1
- Release: JP: April 1982; NA: May 1982
- Genre: Multidirectional shooter
- Modes: Single-player, multiplayer
- Arcade system: Taito SJ System

Wild Western (Note: Japanese: ワイルドウエスタン, Hepburn: Wild Western) is a 1982 multidirectional shooter video game developed and published by Taito for arcades. It was released in April 1982 in Japan and May 1982 in North America, using the Taito SJ System hardware. The following year, it was ported to various Japanese computers including the NEC PC-8801, Fujitsu FM-7, Sharp X1 and the MZ home computers. It was later re-released as part of the Taito Memories (only in Japan) and Taito Legends 2 compilations in 2005 and 2006 respectively, as well as Hamster Corporation releasing the game as part of their Arcade Archives series for the Nintendo Switch and PlayStation 4 in 2019. The latter was eventually released by Taito in their Taito Milestones collection.

== Gameplay ==
The player controls a sheriff who must defeat a band of outlaws attempting to rob a train. The sheriff must travel alongside the speeding train while navigating and shooting outlaws. While the train blocks bullets and cannot be circumvented through, the sheriff can climb the train in order to reach the other end of the screen and defeat other outlaws. Obstacles that kill the sheriff on impact appear occasionally, including rivers or cacti. The game ends if three outlaws manage to get on the train, but victory can be obtained when the sheriff kills all outlaws present. A bonus game where the sheriff attempts to shoot a silver coin thrown by his horse for extra points is available.
