= Bagman (video game) =

1982 video game

- Arcade flyer
- Developer: Valadon Automation
- Publishers: EU: Valadon Automation; NA: Stern; JP: Taito
- Platform: Arcade
- Release: EU: 1982; NA: February 1983; JP: May 1983
- Genre: Platform
- Modes: Single-player, multiplayer

Bagman is a platform game released as an arcade video game by the French company, Valadon Automation in 1982. It was licensed to Stern Electronics for U.S. distribution in 1983 and to Taito in Japan the same year. In France, the game is titled Le Bagnard (English: The Convict). Bagman was followed-up with Super Bagman in 1984.

== Gameplay ==
The objective of the game is to maneuver the bagman through various mine shafts, picking up money bags and placing them in a wheelbarrow at the surface of the mine. The player must avoid pursuing guards, moving ore carts, and descending elevators. The player may temporarily stun the guards by striking them with a pickaxe or by dropping money bags on them when they are below the player on the same ladder. The player may move between the three screens which make up the level via shafts and on the surface.

Bagman is played using one 4-way joystick and one action button. The joystick is also used to jump out of the ore cart. The action button is used to perform the following tasks:

1. Pick up and drop money bags
2. Pick up and drop pickaxe
3. Grab and release the ceiling beam to avoid the ore cart (this can be done while carrying a money bag)
4. Placing a money bag in the wheelbarrow
5. Pick up and drop the wheelbarrow

Points are scored for each horizontal step the player takes, for each money bag placed in the wheelbarrow, and for each guard stunned.

== Reception ==
In Japan, Game Machine listed the game on their June 15, 1983 issue as the third most-successful new table arcade unit of the month. In the United States, it was among the thirteen highest-grossing arcade games of 1983.

== Legacy ==
Aardvark Action Software published clones for the Commodore 64 and TRS-80 Color Computer as Bagitman. Ocean Software released a clone for the Amstrad CPC, Commodore 64, and ZX Spectrum in 1984 titled Gilligan's Gold.

In 2010 a French programmer reconstructed source code from the game to port it to modern platforms.

== Super Bagman ==
In 1984, a sequel, Super Bagman was released. The game expands upon the original's platform and maze gameplay by introducing new environmental hazards, weapons, transportation systems, and larger scrolling levels. New gameplay elements include a gunsmith area containing weapons and a prisoner who can be rescued from a dungeon for an extra life. The game also includes bonus-value gold bags that require additional effort to retrieve and transport.
