= Centuri =

American arcade game company

Centuri, formerly known as Allied Leisure, was an American arcade game manufacturer. They were based in Hialeah, Florida, and were one of the top six suppliers of coin-operated arcade video game machinery in the United States during the early 1980s. Centuri in its modern inception was formed when former Taito America president Ed Miller and his partner Bill Olliges took over Allied Leisure, Inc. They renamed it "Centuri" in 1980. The company's vice president was Joel Hochberg from about 1976 to 1982, before he went on to work for Rare.

Many of the video game machines distributed in the US under the Centuri name were licensed from overseas manufacturers, particularly Japanese developers such as Konami. Allied Leisure previously also manufactured pinball and electro-mechanical games, which were developed in-house.

Centuri had a close relationship with Konami, which licensed the North American rights of their games to Centuri during the early 1980s. This led to Konami acquiring 5% of Centuri's stocks in 1983, with Konami founder Kagemasa Kōzuki announcing he would become a director at Centuri. Centuri discontinued their video game operations in January 1985.

== Games ==
Allied Leisure and Centuri published the following arcade games in the United States:

Pinball and electro-mechanical games released as Allied Leisure (1968–1979)

- Unscramble (12/68; Allied's first game)
- Monkey Bizz (9/69)
- Selecto-matic Unscramble (12/69)
- Wild Cycle (6/70)
- Sonic Fighter (1/71)
- Drag Races (6/71)
- Spin Out (11/71)
- WhatiZit (2/72)
- Sea Hunt (5/72; "Shakerball" game)
- Spooksville (9/72; "Shakerball" game)
- Crack Shot (11/72)
- Rapid Fire (2/73)
- Monte Carlo (1973)
- Super Shifter (5/74)
- Knock Out (8/74)
- Chopper (10/74)
- F-114 (6/75)
- Dyn O' Mite (11/75; solid-state pinball machine)
- Ski (11/75)
- Daytona 500 (6/76)
- Thunderbolt (8/76; solid-state pinball machine)
- X-11 (1977; 120 units built)
- Roy Clark: Super Picker (1/77; solid-state pinball machine)
- Hoe Down (8/77; solid-state pinball machine, retheme of Super Picker)
- Take Five (4/78; cocktail pinball)
- Getaway (5/78; solid-state pinball machine)
- Hearts Spades (12/78; cocktail pinball)
- Flame Of Athens (1/79; cocktail pinball)
- Clay Champ (5/79; licensed from Namco)
- Disco '79 (6/79; cocktail pinball)
- Star Shooter (12/79; cocktail pinball)

Arcade video games released as Allied Leisure (1973–1979)

- Paddle Battle (3/73), a Pong-style game, sold 17,000+ units)
- Tennis Tourney (7/73), Pong-style game, sold 5,000 cabinets, among top 5 best-selling arcade video games of 1973.
- Ric-o-Chet (9/73; European version of Tennis Tourney)
- Super Soccer (12/73), a Pong-style game, sold 5,000 arcade cabinets, among top 5 best-selling arcade video games of 1973.
- Hesitation (4/74)
- Zap (10/74)
- Robot (2/75)
- Fotsball (3/75)
- Street Burners (5/75)
- Fire Power (11/75)
- Ace (3/76)
- Chase (1977; 200 units built)
- Battlestar (1979; unreleased?)
- Lunar Invasion (1979; unreleased?)
- Space Bug (1979; unreleased?)
- Clay Shoot (11/79; video game version of Clay Champ)

Arcade video games released as Centuri (1980–1984)

- Rip Off (1980; color cocktail version licensed from Cinematronics)
- Targ (1980; cocktail version licensed from Exidy)
- Eagle (1980; developed by Jorudan and published by Nichibutsu as Moon Cresta)
- Killer Comet (1980; developed in-house; licensed to Game Plan)
- Megatack (1980; developed in-house; licensed to Game Plan)
- Phoenix (1980; developed by a "smaller Japanese developer" such as Kawa Denshi Giken or TPN); licensors: Hiraoka and Amstar Electronics
- Route-16 (1981; developed by Sun Electronics); licensor: Tehkan
- Pleiades (1981; developed by Tehkan)
- Round-Up (1981; developed by Amenip, later released as Fitter by Taito); licensor: Hiraoka & Co.
- The Pit (1981; developed by AW Electronics); licensor: Zilec
- Vanguard (1981; developed by TOSE); licensor: SNK
- Challenger (1981; developed in-house)
- D-Day (1982; developed by Olympia)
- Locomotion (1982; developed by Konami)
- Swimmer (1982; developed by Tehkan)
- Time Pilot (1982; developed by Konami)
- Tunnel Hunt (1982; developed by Atari, Inc.)
- Aztarac (1983; developed in-house)
- Gyruss (1983; developed by Konami)
- Guzzler (1983; developed by Tehkan)
- Track & Field (1983; developed by Konami)
- Munch Mobile (1983; developed by SNK)
- Circus Charlie (1984; developed by Konami)
- Hyper Sports (1984; developed by Konami)
- Badlands (1984; developed by Konami)
- Mikie: High School Graffiti (1984; developed by Konami)
