= Astro Fighter =

1979 video game

- Japanese arcade flyer
- Developer: Data East
- Publishers: JP: Data East; NA: Sega/Gremlin
- Platform: Arcade
- Release: JP: September 1979; NA: November 1979; EU: January 1980
- Genre: Shoot 'em up
- Modes: Single-player, multiplayer

Astro Fighter (Japanese: アストロファイター, Hepburn: Asutoro Faitā) is a shoot 'em up game released for arcades in 1979. The cabinet was released in three different styles: upright/standard, cocktail, and cabaret. It was developed and distributed by Data East in Japan and was distributed in North America by Sega/Gremlin.

== Gameplay ==
The player's ship (white) shooting at descending attackers

Astro Fighter consists of four waves of enemy craft flying from the top of the screen toward the bottom, and a refuelling stage, which are then repeated with increasingly higher difficulty. The player's task is to eliminate the four successive waves of different types of attacking craft, while avoiding being hit by missiles and bombs, and then refuel by shooting the 'GS' ship before repeating the process. DIP switch settings on the CPU board allow the user/operator to define gameplay options. Depending on these settings the player may start with 3, 4, 5, or 6 lives. The switches also define when a bonus life is awarded. This can be either none (no bonuses awarded), or when the player reaches a score of either 5000, 7000, or 10000. 300 bonus points are received for shooting each 6 falling bombs and for 950 bonus points are awarded for hitting the GS ship accurately on the first shot. A bonus of 10,000 points is given for getting through 4 waves and refuelling by using exactly 2 shots more than the minimum needed.

== Reception ==
In North America, it was the fourth top-grossing video game on the Play Meter arcade charts from September to October 1980. Play Meter later listed it as the fourth highest-grossing arcade video game of the year in the United States (below Asteroids, Galaxian and Space Invaders).

In a 2007 retrospective review, Chris Wilkins of Eurogamer rated the game 8 out of 10, with praise towards the level design, boss battles and difficulty level.

== Super Astro Fighter ==
In 1981, a sequel, Super Astro Fighter was released. The biggest gameplay difference is the addition of the "Space Master" boss ships. In the original Astro Fighter, after defeating four waves of enemies, you simply shot the GS ship to refuel and began another cycle. In Super Astro Fighter, players must first defeat a boss enemy before reaching the refueling stage. Super Astro Fighter updates the game with more detailed enemy artwork and overall improved graphics. New graphics and sounds were added as well.

Data East developed Super Astro Fighter as a graphical revision of Astro Fighter for the DECO Cassette System as opposed to a dedicated arcade board.
