= Solar Fox =

1981 video game

- Atari 2600 cartridge
- Developer: Bally Midway
- Publishers: Bally Midway (arcade); CBS Electronics; Commodore
- Programmers: Atari 2600; Bob Curtiss; Commodore 64; Judy Braddick
- Platforms: Arcade, Atari 2600, Commodore 64
- Release: 1981: Arcade; 1983: Atari 2600, C64
- Genre: Action
- Modes: Single-player, multiplayer

Solar Fox is an arcade game released in 1981 by Bally Midway. It was ported to the Atari 2600 console and was also released as a Commodore-published cartridge for the Commodore 64 computer in 1983.

== Gameplay ==
Arcade screenshot

The player's task is to pilot a starship through a series of squared solar cell matrixes inside a rack. While capturing the cells, the player must dodge waves of fireballs that are being thrown by Sentinels. These Sentinels move continuously along the perimeter of each cell formation. When an entire field of squares is completed (by flying through each square), the game advances to the next rack. The faster a matrix is cleared, the more points are received.

There are 26 solar cell matrix shapes. Every fifth matrix is a Challenge rack. During challenge racks there are no fireballs; the goal is to clear the entire field before the time runs out. Completing each Challenge round awards a letter, to form the mystery word Helios.

== Port ==
The game would later be released on the Atari 2600 console and was also developed as a Commodore-published cartridge for the Commodore 64 computer in 1983.

An Atari 5200 port program written by Van Tran (of Wabbit fame) was completed but never released.

== Tie-in ==
A comic book ad was released in 1983 to support the story of the game.

== Reception ==
The reception of the game was probably good as there was an Atari port.
