= Domino Man =

1983 video game

- Arcade flyer
- Developer: Marvin Glass and Associates
- Publisher: Bally Midway
- Programmers: Richard Ditton; Steve Meyer
- Artist: R. Scott Morrison
- Composer: Elaine Hodgson
- Platform: Arcade
- Release: NA: January 1983
- Genre: Action
- Modes: Single-player, multiplayer
- Arcade system: Midway MCR-II

Domino Man is an action game released in arcades by Bally Midway in 1983. The player controls a bespectacled, balding man, wearing a turtleneck sweater and sporting a mustache, who attempts to set up giant dominoes across the screen. The background music is "Maple Leaf Rag" by Scott Joplin.

== Gameplay ==
The goal of Domino Man is to set up a domino on every site marked by a black dot. Meanwhile, pedestrians meander throughout the playfield and may wander into dominoes, knocking them over. Domino Man can shove them away from the dominoes. A killer bee constantly appears trying to sting Domino Man. There is also a neighborhood bully who is much larger than Domino Man (who can be stunned but not shoved), and an invincible walking clock. Domino Man can set up dominoes, swing a domino as a weapon, and remove placed dominoes (which can be used to stop a cascade of falling dominoes). A Domino Man is lost if he is stung or the leftmost domino is disturbed.

After the player has set up all the dominoes, they will have a choice to either knock down all the dominoes or continue play in hopes of increasing the domino bonus value. After they have made the choice, they will move on to the next screen. If the player loses a life while trying to go for a higher bonus, the bonus resets to its base value (100). When the player chooses to knock down the dominoes, they then score the bonus value for each domino that falls down. The bonus then resets to 100.

When the game is over, a poem is displayed to evaluate the player's performance. For example:

Roses are red
Or so goes the verse,
You set up 52—
You could have done worse.

The main character in this game is very similar (if not the same) as the bartender in Tapper and one of the Timber lumberjacks.
