= Zoo Keeper (1983 video game) =

1983 video game

- Arcade flyer
- Developer: Taito America
- Publisher: Taito America
- Designers: Keith Egging; John Morgan
- Programmers: John Morgan; Mark Blazczyk; Rex Battenberg
- Composer: Tom Fosha
- Platform: Arcade
- Release: NA: 1983; JP: May 1983
- Genres: Action, platform
- Modes: Single-player, multiplayer

Zoo Keeper is an arcade video game released in 1983. It is one of the few games created by the American division of Taito. The player controls Zeke, a zookeeper, attempting to rescue his girlfriend Zelda from a zoo where the animals have escaped from their cages. The majority of the game takes place on a screen where the player builds a wall to keep animals in the zoo—jumping escaped animals to avoid contact. Two different platform game levels are interspersed every few rounds. Zoo Keeper was sold as a conversion kit for Taito's Qix.

== Gameplay ==
Zoo Keeper has three types of stages which repeat in a fixed sequence. In the first, Zeke runs around the edges of a rectangular enclosure. As he moves, a brick wall is built-up below him. Animals bounce around inside the enclosure, making holes in the wall when they contact it. When an animal escapes through the wall, it runs along the outer edge where Zeke is. The stage is timed, with collectible bonus items appearing at preset points. One item is always a net which can be used for a few seconds to put animals back into a cage at the center of the screen. Multiple nets appear in later zoo stages. When time runs out, points are awarded for every animal inside the wall perimeter.

Points are earned for jumping over animals. Values grow exponentially for jumping multiple animals at once without an upper bound. It is possible to get 1,000,000 points with a single jump.

After every second zoo stage, the goal is to jump on horizontally moving platforms to reach a platform at top center, where Zelda is tied to a tree. Some platforms carry bonus items. A monkey throws down coconuts that bounce among the platforms and must be avoided.

After every platform stage except the first, there is a stage with several escalators and a cage in front of each one. Zeke must cross the screen to get to each escalator, jumping over both the animals running toward him and the cage itself. An extra life is awarded for reaching Zelda at the top of the last escalator. The first bonus stage has two escalators, the second has three, and subsequent bonus stages have four.

One life is lost whenever Zeke touches an animal without having a net. In the platform stages, a life is lost when hit by a coconut or falling off the bottom of the screen. The game ends when all lives are lost.

== Development ==
The initial design, from Keith Egging, was for a game about a crab that interacted with eggs and tadpoles that emerged from the eggs. As programmer John Morgan worked on the game, he made substantial changes, and it evolved away from the original concept. He described how the art was created:

I wrote some software that would allow you to use a modified control panel (with more buttons) so that you could create art (pixel by pixel) on the screen itself, complete with animation control. We hired a part time animator to use it to design the animals, complete with great motion for the time.

Later in the game, the ledges in the platform level are invisible, which according to Morgan is a bug. Because they always move in the same pattern, it is still possible to beat the level, so he decided to leave the bug unfixed.

== Ports ==
Zoo Keeper was not published for contemporary home systems, but programmer Christopher H. Omarzu partially implemented an Atari 2600 version which was cancelled in 1984.

== Legacy ==
Zoo Keeper was re-released in the 2005 Taito Legends collection for PlayStation 2, Xbox, and Windows.

The game's main character, Zeke, later appeared in a family-friendly version of Taito's mechanical game Ice Cold Beer called Zeke's Peak. In this game, Zeke is a mountain climber instead of a zookeeper.
