= Lock 'n' Chase =

1981 video game

- Arcade flyer
- Developer: Data East
- Publishers: Data East: Arcade; JP: Data East; NA: Taito 2600, Apple II, Intellivision Mattel Electronics
- Platforms: Arcade, Intellivision, Atari 2600, Apple II, Game Boy
- Release: April 1981: Arcade; JP: April 1981; NA: October 1981 Intellivision; July 9, 1982 Game Boy; JP: May 11, 1990; NA: July 1990; EU: 1990
- Genre: Maze
- Modes: Single-player, multiplayer
- Arcade system: DECO Cassette System

Lock 'n' Chase (Note: Japanese: ロック・ン・チェイス) is a 1981 maze video game developed and published by Data East for arcades. It was released by Taito in North America. It has similarities to Pac-Man, including a goal of collecting dots, with the addition of doors that periodically block pathways.

== Plot ==
Players assume the role of a thief named Lupin, (Note: The thief is not named in non-arcade versions of the game due to copyright laws.) who needs to collect gold coins in a maze before escaping to avoid being caught by police.

== Gameplay ==
Arcade screenshot

The game's protagonist is a thief. The object of the game is to enter a maze styled as a bank vault and collect all the coins and, if possible, any other treasure that may appear. The thief must then exit the maze without being apprehended by the Super D (policemen). The thief can close doorways within the maze in order to temporarily trap the Super D and allow him to keep his distance from them. Up to two doors can be closed at a time, but will reopen after a few seconds; in addition, some doors near the center of the maze will open and close on their own. The Super D policemen are named Stiffy, Scaredy, Smarty, and Silly.

Coins (depicted as dots) are worth 20 points each. In every level, money bags appear in the center of the maze and will briefly stun the Super D when picked up. Money bags are worth 500, 1000, 2000, and up to 4000 points, respectively, for each time they appear. Each level also has a specific treasure that appears near the center of the maze (much like the food items in Pac-Man). These treasures include the following items (listed respectively by level): top hat, crown, briefcase, and telephone. The first three of these treasures are worth 200 points, 300 points and 500 points, respectively. Additional treasures and their point values are revealed as the player completes successive levels.

== Development ==
Home versions for the Intellivision and Atari 2600 were published by Mattel in 1982, and an Apple II version was released in 1983.

In 1990, Data East produced an updated version of Lock 'n' Chase for the Game Boy. The original Lock 'n' Chase is included in the Wii release Data East Arcade Classics and on the PlayStation Network; both versions were released in 2010. The Game Boy version was released on the Nintendo 3DS Virtual Console in January 2012.

Lock 'n' Chase is one of several Data East games featured in the video game Heavy Burger.

A remake has been announced for the Intellivision Amico.

== Legacy ==
A clone for the Atari 8-bit computers was published in 1984 as Money Hungry.

On June 16, 2018, Jason Vasiloff set a world record of 136,140 points at the Funspot in New Hampshire.

== See also ==
- Lady Bug
- Mouse Trap
