= Pac-Man Plus =

1982 video game

- North American arcade flyer
- Developer: Bally Midway
- Publisher: Bally Midway
- Series: Pac-Man
- Platform: Arcade
- Release: November 1982
- Genre: Maze
- Modes: Single-player, multiplayer
- Arcade system: Namco Pac-Man

Pac-Man Plus is an arcade game that was developed/released by Bally Midway in 1982. It is part of the Pac-Man series of games.

== Gameplay ==
The gameplay in Pac-Man Plus is nearly identical to that of the original Pac-Man. The player controls Pac-Man and attempts to score as many points as possible by eating all the Pac-Dots in the maze while avoiding the four ghosts that chase him around the maze and will kill him if they catch him. Eating a Power Pellet will cause the ghosts to turn blue and become vulnerable for a short period of time, allowing Pac-Man to eat them for extra points. Once the maze has been cleared, it will be refilled as the gameplay continues.

The most noticeable differences between the original game and Plus are various tweaks to the graphics: the maze is green instead of blue, vulnerable ghosts are shorter and have a stem and leaf sticking out of their heads, the fruits have been replaced by new items (including a can of Coca-Cola) and the ghosts' eyes are now a pixel closer to each other. In addition to these cosmetic changes, Plus also changes the gameplay slightly: eating a bonus item will cause the ghosts to turn both vulnerable and invisible, and doubles their point value while they are vulnerable. Eating a Power Pellet also sometimes has unpredictable results, such as turning the maze invisible or turning only three of the four ghosts blue (the latter of which makes it impossible to clear a round by using a pattern). The ghosts are also faster and more aggressive than they were in the original Pac-Man, which makes the game seem overall faster-paced and more difficult by comparison.

== Development ==
Midway advertised the game as "the only legal PAC-MAN conversion package" and called it "Exciting!" and "New!". Pac-Man Plus was an upgrade kit for Namco Pac-Man boards. It consisted of a module which connected via a ribbon cable to the socket originally occupied by the Zilog Z80 microprocessor. The module contained its own Z80 as well as additional components. It was potted with epoxy to prevent easy reverse-engineering. Additionally, the kit also replaced the four Pac-Man program ROMs on the main game board with new code. Two other ROMs containing updated data for drawing character and maze were also exchanged. Finally, two relatively tiny supplementary ROMs containing new color data completed the modification.

== Reception ==
Arcade Express rated the game eight out of ten, stating that it "features all the graphics, challenge and excitement of the original while eliminating patterned play" with random movement and a few surprises making it "an interesting new twist for Pac-fans."

== Legacy ==
There were no contemporary home versions. Recent versions include a J2ME mobile version, and ports included in several TV Games from Jakks Pacific and from Bandai.

In addition, there have been efforts by some homebrew game developers to port Pac-Man Plus to classic game consoles, such as the ColecoVision Pac-Man Collection by Opcode Games (press 7587 on the #2 controller at the main menu screen when seeing PLUS press the fire button), Master System, Atari 2600, and more recently the Atari 5200 and 7800.

In 2018, an arcade cabinet called Pac-Man's Pixel Bash was released by Bandai Namco Amusements with 31 or 32 classic Namco games included, 1 of which is Pac-Man Plus. The arcade cabinet is available in both coin-op, and home versions.

In 2018, Arcade1Up released a new home arcade cabinet that plays both regular Pac-Man and Pac-Man Plus. In 2020, Arcade 1Up released a Pac-Man 40th anniversary home arcade cabinet (Generation 3), which included seven games, of which one was Pac-Man Plus.

In 2022, Arcade1Up, in conjunction with Sam's Club, released a Pac-Man Plus themed cabaret legacy edition with the same game list as 2021's Bandai Namco legacy edition and similar releases. Although the cabinet was mistakenly labeled as Super Pac-Man, it is currently being corrected.
