= Mega Zone (video game) =

1983 video game

- European arcade flyer
- Developer: Konami
- Publishers: JP: Konami; NA: Interlogic
- Platform: Arcade
- Release: JP: March 1983; NA: October 1983; EU: 1983
- Genre: Scrolling shooter
- Modes: Single-player, multiplayer

Mega Zone (Note: Japanese: メガゾーン, Hepburn: Mega Zōn) is a 1983 vertically scrolling shooter video game developed and published by Konami for arcades. It was released in Japan in March 1983 and in North America by Interlogic in November 1983.

Hamster Corporation released the game as part of their Arcade Archives series for the Nintendo Switch and PlayStation 4, as well as their Arcade Archives 2 series for the Nintendo Switch 2, PlayStation 5 and Xbox Series X/S in February 2026.

== Gameplay ==
Mega Zone is similar to Xevious, where the player flies over a landscape of rivers and trees and futuristic enemy emplacements. There are both aerial and ground targets, but unlike Xevious both can be destroyed with the same weapon. At certain points the player can choose either the left or right fork of a branching path.
