= Guzzler =

1983 video game

- Arcade flyer
- Developer: Tehkan
- Publishers: JP/EU: Tehkan; NA: Centuri
- Designer: Michitaka Tsuruta
- Platforms: Arcade, SG-1000
- Release: JP: April 1983; NA: November 1983
- Genre: Maze
- Modes: Single-player, multiplayer

Guzzler (Note: Japanese: ガズラー, Hepburn: Gazurā) is a 1983 maze video game developed and published by Tehkan for arcades. It was released in Japan in April 1983 and in North America by Centuri in November 1983. It was ported to the SG-1000 console. Hamster Corporation released the game as part of their Arcade Archives series for the Nintendo Switch and PlayStation 4 in May 2021.

== Gameplay ==
The player controls a firefighter creature who can drink water from puddles, then extinguish fires and monsters spawned from them. Each level is a maze of varying openness. That must be extinguished to complete the level, also spawn fire-themed monsters which pursue the player. The main character can attack with three blasts of liquid before becoming empty. With each blast of liquid, the character moves faster and gets closer to being an empty outline with pink shoes. When empty the character is a shell of a sprite, but moves faster. Liquid is replenished by drinking from puddles. Occasionally, an alcoholic beverage appears in the center of the screen. Picking it up causes the character to refill and turn red and the fires temporarily freeze.

== Reception ==
William Michael Brown wrote in the Electronic Fun with Computers & Games 1983 coin-op preview:

Of all the brand new [conversion] kit titles we saw, probably the best is Ceniuri's Guzzler—a comical maze game starring a little guy who is not much more than a fat, mobile water tank. Up against a fast mob of angry demons, flashes and fireballs, his only defense is to drench them with some of his limited supply of water. The game's graphics and sounds are outstanding, and there's even a special feature that lets you win a free game whether you scored high or not.
