= Wacko =

1983 video game

- Developer: Bally Midway
- Publisher: Bally Midway
- Designers: Steve Meyer; Scott Morrison
- Programmers: Richard Ditton; Steve Meyer
- Artist: Scott Morrison
- Composer: Elaine Ditton
- Platform: Arcade
- Release: 1983
- Genre: Action
- Modes: Single-player, multiplayer
- Arcade system: Bally Midway MCR II

Wacko is a 1983 arcade video game by Bally Midway. It has unique angled cabinet design and a combination of trackball and joystick controls.

The player assumes the role of Kapt'n Krooz'r, a small, green alien within a bubble-topped spaceship who also appears in the game Kozmik Krooz'r. The goal of each level is to eliminate the monsters, accomplished by shooting twin pairs in succession. As the player progresses, shooting monsters out of order creates mutants that must be unmatched before they can be eliminated.

== Gameplay ==
The player moves Kapt'n Krooz'r with the trackball and fires in four directions using either joystick. Shooting a single monster stuns it for a few seconds. The player must then shoot the monster's twin before the first one recovers in order to eliminate the pair.

On later boards, shooting a different monster results in the two becoming mutants – the head of one joins with the torso of the other, and vice versa. To eliminate these mutants, the player must either unmix them by shooting the same pair again, or produce a second set of mutants which can then be paired up with the first. Eliminating a pair of mutants is worth more points than eliminating a pair of non-mutants.

As the player advances from board to board, the following additional transformations appear, introduced one at a time:

- Matched pairs of large monsters become tiny and fly around the screen
- Tiny monsters turn into eggs and run around
- Eggs turn into bats
- Some large monsters start as mutants

Each new form requires only one shot to be either destroyed or changed into the next one. All monsters on the screen must be turned into the next form before any of them can be destroyed or further transformed.

== Legacy ==
Wacko is available as a part of two compilations of arcade games: Midway Arcade Treasures 2, for the GameCube, PlayStation 2, and Xbox; and Midway Arcade Treasures Deluxe Edition for the PC.

Steve Harris of Missouri, USA, scored a world record 1,608,100 points playing Wacko at the NKC Pro Bowl in Kansas City, Missouri, USA, on March 31, 1983.

Weirdo is a 1987 clone for the TRS-80 Color Computer.
