= Buck Rogers: Planet of Zoom =

1982 video game

- Atari 2600 cover art
- Developer: Sega
- Publisher: Sega
- Platform: Arcade: Atari 2600, Atari 5200, Atari 8-bit, VIC-20, Commodore 64, Coleco Adam, MSX, TI-99/4A, ColecoVision, Apple II, IBM PC, SG-1000, ZX Spectrum
- Release: November 30, 1982: Arcade; JP: November 30, 1982; NA: November 1982; EU: Early 1983 2600, 5200, Atari 8-bit, VIC-20; November 1983 C64, Adam; 1983 MSX; UK: 1983; JP: 1985 TI-99/4A; February 1984 ColecoVision; April 1984 Apple II, IBM PC; 1984 SG-1000; JP: July 1985 ZX Spectrum; UK: 1985
- Genre: Rail shooter
- Mode: Single-player
- Arcade system: Sega VCO Object

Buck Rogers: Planet of Zoom, (Note: Japanese: バック・ロジャース：プラネット・オブ・ズーム, Hepburn: Bakku Rojāsu: Puranetto obu Zūmu) known as Zoom 909 (Note: Japanese: ズーム909, Hepburn: Zūmu kyū-hyaku-kyū) in Japan, is a 1982 rail shooter developed and published by Sega as an arcade video game. The player controls a spaceship in a third-person perspective, adapting the three-dimensional perspective of Sega's earlier racing video game Turbo (1981) for the space shoot 'em up genre. It uses the Buck Rogers license, referencing the space battles, though Buck himself is never seen.

The arcade game debuted at the Amusement & Music Operators Association (AMOA) show, held during November 18–20, 1982, where it was considered one of the show's best games and a milestone for demonstrating the potential of 3D shoot 'em up gameplay. Ports were released for the SG-1000, Atari 2600, Atari 5200, Atari 8-bit computers, Coleco Adam, ColecoVision, MSX, Commodore 64, VIC-20, TI-99/4A, Apple II, and ZX Spectrum. The IBM PC version uses CGA graphics.

== Gameplay ==
Gameplay screenshot (Atari 2600)

The game takes place in a pseudo-3D playfield, with the player's ship seen from behind as if it is flying into the screen. Enemies appear both in front of the player flying toward them, as well as behind flying past them and then typically turning around to attack again. The game is separated into sections in which a certain number of enemies have to be killed to advance, the remaining number shown as a bar graph in a fashion similar to Time Pilot. A second bar shows a timer that counts down at a steady rate; any time left in the bar becomes a bonus score when the section ends.

The first section takes place in a trench reminiscent of the final attack on the Death Star in Star Wars. Enemies in the form of spaceships and hopping robots appear in the distance and approach the player, attempting to collide with them. The action then moves into sections in space, over a planet where the player has to fly between upright pylons, back to the trench, and other levels. This progression ends with a boss fight against a large ship where the player has to destroy the enemy's four engines while it launches attacking craft. The pattern of levels repeats after this.

== Reception ==
In the United States, it was among the thirteen highest-grossing arcade games of 1983. In Japan, Game Machine listed it as the thirteenth most successful upright/cockpit arcade unit of May 1985.

The arcade game received positive reviews from critics. American magazine Video Games gave it a highly positive review following its AMOA 1982 debut, calling it the second best game of the show. They called it a "gorgeous, 3-D game that deserves the" moniker "Space Turbo" with "high-quality graphics" and "fast and furious" action.

French magazine Tilt, in its May 1983 issue, rated the arcade game six out of six stars. British magazine Computer and Video Games also gave it a positive review, noting the behind-the-ship perspective, comparing the opening tunnel section to the Death Star battle in the film Star Wars, and stating that anyone "who has enjoyed the TV series will be interested to see just how it converts to the video screen!"

=== Home conversions ===
Michael Blanchet for Electronic Fun with Computers & Games reviewed the Coleco Adam version, stating: "After playing Buck Rogers a scant fifty times, I noticed an ever-increasing number of on-screen glitches. I can only presume they were caused by tape wear".

Dan Hallassey for Ahoy! reviewed the Commodore 64 and VIC-20 versions, stating that "graphics and gameplay combine to make this an excellent and absorbing – though admittedly one-note – space game".

== Legacy ==
Planet of Zoom influenced Sega's Space Harrier (1985), which in turn influenced Nintendo's Star Fox (1993).
