= Star Wars (1983 video game) =

1983 video game

- North American arcade flyer, showing the upright and cockpit cabinets
- Developer: Atari, Inc.
- Publishers: Arcade: NA/JP/UK: Atari, Inc.; SPA: Sega, S.A. SONIC; Ports; Parker Brothers; Domark; Broderbund
- Designer: Mike Hally
- Programmers: Greg Rivera; Norm Avellar
- Composer: Earl Vickers
- Series: Star Wars
- Platform: Arcade: Atari 2600, Atari 5200, Atari 8-bit, ColecoVision, Commodore 64, Amiga, Atari ST, Amstrad CPC, Acorn Electron, BBC Micro, ZX Spectrum, MS-DOS, Macintosh 128K
- Release: May 5, 1983: Arcade; NA: May 5, 1983; JP: May 1983; UK: September 1983; SPA: 1983 2600, 5200, ColecoVision; June 1984 MS-DOS; January 1989 Atari ST; March 1989 Amiga; April 1989 Macintosh; September 1989
- Genre: Rail shooter
- Mode: Single-player

Star Wars is a first-person rail shooter designed by Mike Hally and released as an arcade video game in 1983 by Atari, Inc. It uses 3D color vector graphics to simulate the assault on the Death Star from the 1977 film Star Wars. There are three connected gameplay sequences: combat against TIE fighters in space, flying across the surface of the Death Star, and the final trench run. The sequence then repeats with added complications and the Death Star regenerating. The player's X-Wing fighter has a shield which only protects against damage a certain number of times, then the next hit ends the game. Speech synthesis emulates actors from the film.

Developed during the golden age of arcade games, Star Wars has been included on lists of the greatest video games of all time. Home ports were published by Parker Brothers, Domark, and Broderbund. It was followed by a lesser-known arcade sequel, sold as a conversion kit for the original, in 1985: Star Wars: The Empire Strikes Back.

== Gameplay ==
The first phase: combat vs. TIE fighters. The player's shield can take 6 hits.

Assuming the role of Luke Skywalker ("Red Five"), the player pilots an X-wing fighter from a first-person perspective. The controls consist of a yoke with four buttons — two trigger style and two in position to be pressed by the thumbs — each of which fires a laser positioned on the four leading edges of the X-Wings.

The player does not have to destroy every TIE fighter and gun turret to advance through the game. Instead, the player must survive for a set length of time by avoiding the enemies and their shots or destroying them. The player begins with six shields, one of which is lost for every collision into an enemy or projectile. If the player loses all shields and is hit again, the game ends.

Each wave consists of three attack phases, culminating in the destruction of the Death Star.

=== Phase 1 ===
In the first phase, the "Imperial March" or another part of John Williams's Star Wars score is briefly played electronically and the player engages in a dogfight with Darth Vader and enemy TIE fighters in outer space near the Death Star. After the TIE fighter waves, when flying towards the Death Star, the yellow grid lines on the Death Star spell out either "May the force be with you" on odd-numbered waves or names of some of the developers on even numbered waves.

=== Phase 2 ===
In the second phase, the player must fly across the surface of the Death Star to reach its equatorial trench. This section is omitted during the first wave of the game. During the second wave, the player is attacked by artillery bunkers. In the third and subsequent waves, laser turrets on towers rise to confront the player. A bonus is awarded for destroying every turret.

=== Phase 3 ===
In the third phase, the player must navigate the trench until finally firing a proton torpedo for a direct hit on the exhaust port target. If the player is successful, the Death Star explodes and the player is awarded a bonus shield, to a maximum of six (can be set internally for a maximum of eight). Should the player fail to hit the exhaust port, a shield is lost and the trench must be attempted again. If the player manages to destroy the Death Star without firing at anything but the exhaust port, a bonus is awarded for "using the Force."

The game then resets to the first phase. Each successive wave greatly increases the difficulty; TIE fighters shoot more often, artillery bunkers and laser towers spawn in the second phase, and obstacles appear in the trench during the third. Unlike the movie, where the units shoot beams similar to lasers, the enemy units in this game shoot projectiles resembling fireballs, which give the player a chance of destroying the shots.

== Development ==
Development on the game started in 1981 under the title Warp Speed and was initially headed up by Ed Rotberg (who also worked on the vector-based Battlezone). The controller was originally designed for Army Battlezone, a Bradley Fighting Vehicle training simulator Atari created for the United States Army. Rotberg left Atari in October 1981, after which Atari signed a licensing agreement with Lucasfilm and finished the game. Focus group testing was conducted on January 24, 1983, by groups of 15-19 year old men, 20-35 year old men, and 17-30 year old women.

== Ports ==
Star Wars was converted first by Parker Brothers (with development by Imagic) in 1983 and 1984 to the Atari 2600, Atari 5200, Atari 8-bit computers, ColecoVision, and Commodore 64.

Acorn Electron conversion by Vektor Grafix

The same game was converted again, in 1987 and 1988, for the Amiga, Atari ST, Amstrad CPC, ZX Spectrum, Acorn Electron and BBC Micro; the game was also converted again for the Atari 8-bits and the Commodore 64. All conversions were developed by UK-based Vektor Grafix (the Atari 8-bit version by Zeppelin Games being an exception) and were published in Europe by Domark. That same year, Broderbund acquired the rights to develop Star Wars games from Lucasfilm. Broderbund published the Macintosh, Commodore 64, and MS-DOS versions of the arcade game in North America in 1988, in addition to republishing the Atari ST and Amiga versions in 1989.

The Amiga and Atari ST allow mouse control and include digitized sound effects. The Macintosh version contains sampled speech from the films, but has no in-game music other than a monophonic theme during the "attract" mode.

== Reception ==
The game was Atari's top-selling 1983 arcade release, with Atari producing 12,695 arcade cabinets. In the United States, it topped the Play Meter arcade chart for street locations in October 1983. In Japan, Game Machine listed Star Wars on their November 1, 1983 issue as being the most successful upright/cockpit arcade unit of the month.

COMPUTE! praised the Atari ST version of Star Wars, calling it "amazing, smoothly animated". The MS-DOS, Amiga, Atari ST, and Commodore 64 versions by Broderbund were reviewed in 1989 in Dragon #145 by Hartley, Patricia, and Kirk Lesser in "The Role of Computers" column. The reviewers gave the game 3 out of 5 stars. Macworld praised the Macintosh version's gameplay, stating it has "fast-paced action" and is "extremely challenging in higher levels". The magazine also praised the sound effects and 3D graphics, stating that the latter "enhance the game's action and excitement". Macworld criticized the master disk-based copy protection, and the game only having three playable scenarios with "limited" replay value.

=== Retrospective ===
In 1995, Flux magazine ranked the game 61st on their "Top 100 Video Games." In 1996, Next Generation listed the arcade version as number 58 on their "Top 100 Games of All Time". Citing "Awesome vector graphics, multiple triggers, a deluxe cabinet with powerful speakers in the back, [and] digitized voices", they ventured that it was "Probably the best licensed game ever." In 1999, Next Generation listed Star Wars as number 24 on their "Top 50 Games of All Time", commenting that, "Besides giving you the opportunity to reenact what many of us consider to be the greatest cinematic experience of our youth, Star Wars delivered fast-shooting gameplay with all the subtleties, and the combination of tight control and vector graphics make it equally fun today." In 2001, it was voted one of the top 100 arcade games of all time by the members of Killer List of Videogames.

== Legacy ==
Star Wars arcade machines can be converted into The Empire Strikes Back via a conversion kit.

Emulated versions of Star Wars and its two arcade sequels can be found as unlockable extras in Star Wars Rogue Squadron III: Rebel Strike (2005). A bonus preview disc given to those who pre-ordered Rebel Strike also includes the full arcade game.

In October 2019, Tastemakers LLC's Arcade1up division released a 3/4 scale recreation of the original Atari arcade cabinet featuring emulated versions of the coin-op Star Wars arcade, The Empire Strikes Back and Return of the Jedi games.

=== High scores ===
In 1984, Robert Mruczek scored 300 million points in 49 hours of gameplay (the world record for an individual) and in 2005, Brandon Erickson set a world endurance record of 54 hours on a single credit (with a score of 283 million). In June 1985, Flavio Tozzi, Dave Roberts and Mike Ohren played as a team in turns for five days, two hours and 26 minutes on a single credit to attain the world record score of 1,000,000,012 points. It was verified in the September 1985 edition of the Computer and Video Games. Their efforts raised money for a local charity. The score counter of this game "turns over" at 100 million points.

It was decided to put the machines on a harder setting for the annual Twin Galaxies International Scoreboard/Guinness Book Masters Tournament: initial shields and no bonus shields. In the 1986 Tournament, David Palmer scored 31,660,614 points in about 7 hours, a score which was published in the Guinness Book of World Records and remains the world record to this day.

== Works cited ==
- Guynes, Sean; Hassler-Forest, Dan, eds. (2018). Star Wars and the History of Transmedia Storytelling. Amsterdam University Press. ISBN 9789462986213.
