= Congo Bongo =

1983 video game

- Developers: Sega; Ikegami Tsushinki
- Publishers: JP/EU: Sega; NA: Sega/Gremlin
- Platforms: Arcade, Apple II, Atari 8-bit, Atari 2600, Atari 5200, ColecoVision, Commodore 64, IBM PC, Intellivision, MSX, SG-1000, TI-99/4A, VIC-20
- Release: JP: February 14, 1983; NA: March 1983; EU: March 1983
- Genre: Platform
- Modes: Single-player, multiplayer

Congo Bongo, also released under the title Tip Top, is an isometric platform game released by Sega for arcades in 1983. Sources credit Ikegami Tsushinki with development work on the game. Its fixed isometric viewpoint is similar to that used in Sega's earlier Zaxxon (1982).

The player controls a safari hunter pursuing Bongo, a gorilla who has set fire to the hunter's tent. The arcade game consists of four single-screen stages in which the player climbs terrain, jumps over hazards and avoids animals while trying to reach Bongo.

== Development and release ==
Congo Bongo was developed using hardware related to that used for Zaxxon. Video game historian Ken Horowitz has credited Ikegami Tsushinki with development work on the game; Ikegami had previously carried out programming work on Nintendo's Donkey Kong.

The similarities between the two games were noted at the time of release. Computer and Video Games described the concept as essentially Donkey Kong presented in three dimensions, while also comparing the visual perspective with Zaxxon.

Sega displayed Congo Bongo at the 1983 Amusement Operators Expo in Chicago. Cash Box reported that Sega marketing executive Bob Rosenbaum said the game had performed strongly during a four-week location test.

== Gameplay ==
The hunter crossing a bridge in the arcade version

The player moves the hunter with an eight-way joystick and uses a single button to jump. The objective of each stage is to make a path through the environment while avoiding animals and other hazards and eventually reach Bongo. A decreasing bonus counter also acts as a time limit.

The arcade game has four stages. On Steep Peak, the hunter climbs toward Bongo while avoiding coconuts and monkeys. Snake Lake is formed from bridges and islands guarded by snakes and scorpions, with the player using a hippopotamus to cross part of the water. Rhino Ridge requires the player to avoid charging rhinoceroses by jumping over them or taking cover in holes. The final stage, Lazy Lagoon, has the hunter cross the water using lily pads, hippopotamuses and fish before avoiding another group of rhinoceroses to reach Bongo.

After the fourth stage is completed, the game returns to the first stage at a higher difficulty. One or two players can play, with two-player games using alternating turns.

Contemporary reviewers frequently compared the structure of Congo Bongo with Donkey Kong. Computer and Video Games also noted that the final stage resembles Frogger.

== Reception ==
In Japan, Game Machine ranked Congo Bongo as the fifth most-successful table arcade game in its 15 June 1983 issue.

Reception in the United States was mixed. Computer and Video Games was generally positive about the arcade game and regarded the combination of Donkey Kong-style platforming and an isometric presentation as an interesting idea. During the downturn in the North American video game industry later in 1983, however, Time reported that a Los Angeles arcade distributor regarded Congo Bongo as one of several poorly selling machines in his inventory and was selling cabinets at a substantial discount.

The home versions also received differing reviews. The ColecoVision, Atari 5200 and Intellivision versions received the award for Best Videogame Audio-Visual Effects at the 1984 Arkie Awards.

Dan Hallassey of Ahoy! was critical of the Commodore 64 and VIC-20 versions, particularly their repetitive gameplay, difficulty and music. Computer Games gave the Atari VCS version a C− rating and described it as a disappointing conversion of the arcade game. In a reader poll published by ST. Game, the Atari version was selected as the worst Atari program of 1983.

== Legacy ==
The arcade version was later included as an unlockable game in the PlayStation Portable release of Sega Genesis Collection. It was also included among the unlockable arcade games in Sonic's Ultimate Genesis Collection for the Xbox 360 and PlayStation 3.

A sequel was planned but never released. Horowitz reports that development of a follow-up was abandoned during the North American video game market downturn of the early 1980s.
