= MotoRace USA =

1983 video game

- North American arcade flyer
- Developer: Irem (Note: SG-1000 version developed by Sega.)
- Publishers: Irem: Arcade; JP: Irem; NA: Williams Electronics; EU: Comercial Electronica SG-1000 Sega Famicom Irem
- Platforms: Arcade, SG-1000, Famicom
- Release: Arcade: JP: March 31, 1983; NA: July 1983; EU: 1983; SG-1000: JP: March 1984; Famicom: JP: July 18, 1985
- Genre: Racing
- Modes: Single-player, multiplayer

MotoRace USA (also known as Traverse USA, in Japan as Zippy Race, (Note: Japanese: ジッピーレース, Hepburn: Jippī Rēsu) and in Spain as Mototour) is a 1983 racing video game developed and published by Irem for Japanese arcades; it was released in North America by Williams Electronics and in Europe by Comercial Electronica. The player controls a racer who must travel on a motorcycle from Los Angeles to New York City.

== Gameplay ==
Arcade screenshot

Every level has two parts:

1. The first part uses an overhead point of view, in which overtaken cars cause the player's rank to increment by 1 per car. The current rank is shown in the bottom right hand corner of the game screen during each stage.
2. The second part uses a third-person point of view, in which the player must try not to crash into the opposite cars while a background relative to the city they're traveling to is shown (i.e.: if the player is reaching Las Vegas, then a few casinos can be seen in the background). Oncoming cars passed do not increase the player's rank.

There are five different stages that the player encounters on their way to the final destination (NY) before the game starts back at stage one as outlined below. These stages alternate from tarmac on stages one, three and five, to unsealed (dirt) roads on stages two and four. On the tarmac stages bonus fuel can be picked up by running over the gas can icon. There is also a "wheelie" section which when run over causes the rider's bike to do a wheelstand and gain bonus points. On the dirt road stages both fuel and points can be gained by running over the gas cans or the score amounts indicated on the playfield. On the dirt road stage there are several log bridges that cross water and a "jump" section on some bridges - riding over the jump icon results in a score bonus. On all stages there are puddles of water which, if ridden through, render the bike unable to steer for a short period of time and a tire squealing sound is played briefly.

Crashing into cars, road edges, bushes/trees, rocks or missing a bridge and riding into the water on a dirt road stage results in the motorcycle stopping and restarting; costing the player an amount of fuel. Running out of fuel prevents the motorcycle from going any further and causes the game to be over, but in the arcade version, the player can continue by inserting more coins (if necessary) and pressing START. Crashing can also result (especially in later levels) in being overtaken by cars which decreases the player's rank.

As the player reaches each city the rank achieved results in a bonus amount being added to the score and extra fuel added to the player's total. The higher the position achieved, the more points and fuel is awarded.

When the player reaches NY, a sign saying "Viva NY" is shown while the Statue of Liberty waves its hand and "The Star-Spangled Banner" is played. After this, the game restarts with the player's score intact but the difficulty increases and the player has a higher capacity motorcycle (with correspondingly faster top speed).

== Reception ==
In Japan, Game Machine listed MotoRace USA as the most successful new table arcade unit of July 1983.

== Development ==
Cabinet art was done by Larry Day and Bruce Schafernak of Advertising Posters in Chicago.

== Home ports ==
The game was ported to the SG-1000 home console by Sega in March 1984, and the Family Computer in 1985.

An updated version of the game was announced for the Intellivision Amico, but never released.

== See also ==
- Racing Damashii, motorcycle racing game from Irem for the Game Boy, released in 1991 exclusively in Japan
