= Bump 'n' Jump =

1982 video game

- Arcade flyer
- Developer: Data East
- Publishers: Data East: Arcade; JP: Data East; NA: Bally Midway 2600, Intellivision Mattel Electronics ColecoVision Coleco Famicom/NES; JP: Data East; NA: Vic Tokai
- Composers: Hiroaki Yoshida; Azusa Hara (NES)
- Platforms: Arcade, Intellivision, Atari 2600, ColecoVision, Sharp X1, Nintendo Entertainment System
- Release: November 1982: Arcade; JP: November 1982; NA: March 1983 2600, Intellivision; November 1983 ColecoVision; July 1984 Famicom/NES; JP: October 8, 1986; NA: December 1988
- Genre: Vehicular combat
- Modes: Single-player, multiplayer
- Arcade system: DECO Cassette System

Bump 'n' Jump, also known in Japan as Burnin' Rubber (Note: Japanese: バーニンラバー, Hepburn: Bānin Rabā), is a 1982 vehicular combat video game developed and published by Data East for arcades. Released in North America by Bally Midway, the arcade version was available as both a dedicated board and as part of Data East's DECO Cassette System. The goal is to drive to the end of a course while knocking enemy vehicles into the sides of the track and jumping over large obstacles like bodies of water.

The arcade game was a commercial success in Japan and North America. It was ported to the Atari 2600, Intellivision, ColecoVision, Nintendo Entertainment System, and Sharp X1. The Famicom version of Burnin' Rubber was published as Buggy Popper (バギー・ポッパー, Bagī Poppā) in Japan in October 1986.

== Gameplay ==
The enemy vehicles are cars and trucks. Cars can be bumped into obstacles or jumped upon and destroyed. Trucks cannot be bumped and can only be jumped upon to destroy them and will sometimes drop debris that the player has to avoid. Players get points for bumping other cars and causing them to crash. At the end of each level, players receive 300 points on level 1, and then add 100 each level per enemy vehicle crashed, but making it through the level without wrecking any vehicles results in a special bonus of 50,000 points. Going from one level to another is characterised by a change of seasons.

When a large obstacle which needs to jumped over, such as a body of water, is approaching, then the game displays a flashing exclamation point as a warning.

When the speed of the car is at least 100 mph, players are able to perform a jump. Cars are lost upon wrecking into either side of the road, plunging into water, or hitting an obstacle. The game continues until the player runs out of cars. Extra cars will be given during the game, except after 999,999 points are scored. Once this score is reached, a "survival of the fittest" mode will activate for the rest of the game, to the very last life.

== Ports ==
NES version

Mattel Electronics licensed Bump 'n' Jump from Data East and in 1983 released an Intellivision version and then a version for the Atari 2600. They also produced a version for ColecoVision distributed by Coleco in 1984.

Data East released a port of Burnin' Rubber as Buggy Popper for the Famicom in Japan on 8 October 1986. It was published for the Nintendo Entertainment System in North America by Vic Tokai in December 1988 as Bump 'n' Jump. Adding a level of complexity, the NES version of the game also requires players to pick up cans of gasoline that are interspersed in each course, since the car uses up fuel steadily throughout the game if it's going too fast.

== Reception ==
In Japan, Burnin' Rubber was the ninth highest-grossing arcade game of 1982. In the United States, Bump 'n' Jump was among the thirteen highest-grossing arcade games of 1983.

== Legacy ==
In 1996, Next Generation listed it as number 65 on their "Top 100 Games of All Time", lauding the innovative jumping and bumping mechanics, the variety of cars, and the strong sensation of speed and tension.

The arcade version was made available on the PlayStation Portable in North America by G1M2 with its original title. The game also appears on the Data East Arcade Classics compilation with its original name.

C64 Burnin' Rubber

Two clones were released for the Commodore 64: Burnin' Rubber (1983) and Bumping Buggies (1984).

=== High scores ===
On December 25, 2011, Charlie Wehner of Missouri beat the arcade version's world record with a score of 3,175,880. On September 14, 2013, John McNeill of Brisbane, Australia claimed the world record with a score of 5,869,264, but due to ownership issues with Twin Galaxies at the time, the score was not officially recognised until January 5, 2015.

The world record using MAME was achieved by John McNeill of Brisbane, Australia on March 2, 2012 with a score of 2,531,168.

== See also ==
- Spy Hunter
