= Time Pilot =

1982 video game

- North American arcade flyer
- Developer: Konami
- Publishers: WW: Konami; NA: Centuri; PAL: Atari; FRA: Karateco
- Designer: Yoshiki Okamoto
- Programmer: Hideki Ooyama
- Artist: Yoshiki Okamoto
- Composer: Masahiro Inoue
- Platforms: Arcade, Atari 2600, MSX, ColecoVision
- Release: Arcade: JP: November 1982; WW: January 1983; ColecoVision: NA: August 1983; Atari 2600: NA: October 1983; MSX: EU: 1983; JP: December 1984
- Genre: Multidirectional shooter
- Modes: Single-player, multiplayer

Time Pilot (Note: Japanese: タイムパイロット, Hepburn: Taimu pairotto) is a 1982 multidirectional shooter video game developed and published by Konami for arcades. It was distributed in the United States by Centuri and by Atari in PAL regions. While engaging in aerial combat, the player-controlled jet flies across open airspace that scrolls indefinitely in all directions. Each level is themed to a different time period. Home ports for the Atari 2600, MSX, and ColecoVision were released in 1983 respectively by Konami and Coleco.

A top-down sequel, Time Pilot '84, was released in arcades in 1984. It eliminated the time-travel motif and instead took place over a futuristic landscape.

== Gameplay ==
Gameplay screenshot

Players assume the role of a pilot of a futuristic fighter jet trying to rescue fellow pilots trapped in different time eras. The player's jet remains in the center of the screen at all times, and the eight-direction joystick causes their jet to rotate to face in that direction, causing the screen to scroll in that direction to present forward motion.

In each level, players battle many enemy aircraft and the occasional stronger aircraft. After a fixed number of these aircraft are destroyed, as displayed on a bar at the bottom right of the screen, a mothership appears. Once the mothership is defeated, they move onto the next time period. Parachuting pilots will occasionally appear and award players points if collected.

There are five levels: 1910, 1940, 1970, 1982/1983 (Note: As this level represents what was then the present day, all releases of Time Pilot produced after 1982 contain an updated version of the game that changes the year to 1983.) and 2001. After the fifth level is finished, the game repeats thereafter.

Extra lives are given at 10,000 points, and per 50,000 scored up to 960,000; thereafter, the game goes to "survival of the fittest" mode.

Fighters are destroyed if they collide into bullets, enemy ships, bombs or missiles. Game ends when their last fighter is destroyed.

== Development ==
Designer Yoshiki Okamoto's proposal for Time Pilot was initially rejected by his boss at Konami, who assigned Okamoto to work on a driving game instead. Okamoto secretly gave instructions to his programmer to work on his idea while he pretended to work on a driving game in front of his boss.

== Reception ==
In Japan, the annual Game Machine chart listed Time Pilot as the fifth highest-grossing arcade video game of 1982. Game Machine later listed Time Pilot on their June 1, 1983 issue as being the eighteenth most popular arcade title of the month.

In the United States, the game topped the Play Meter arcade earnings chart in February 1983. The Amusement & Music Operators Association (AMOA) later listed it among the thirteen highest-earning arcade games of 1983.

Computer and Video Games magazine gave the arcade game a generally favorable review upon release.

== Legacy ==
=== Re-releases ===
A Time Pilot '95 bonus game is available in Ganbare Goemon Kirakira Douchuu: Boku ga Dancer ni Natta Wake. for the Super Famicom. The arcade version was released on the PlayStation through Konami Arcade Classics in 1999. It was also re-released for the Xbox 360 as part of Xbox Live Arcade on August 30, 2006, Nintendo DS as part of Konami Classics Series: Arcade Hits and i-mode mobile phones in Japan, 2004.

The game was ported to the Game Boy Advance as part of Konami Collector's Series: Arcade Advanced on March 18, 2002. This version includes a hidden sixth era, 1,000,000 BC, with pterodactyl enemies.

Hamster Corporation released the arcade version for the PlayStation 2 as part of the Oretachi Gēsen Zoku series in 2005 in Japan. The company also released the game as part of their Arcade Archives series for the Nintendo Switch and PlayStation 4 in 2021.

=== Clones ===
Fury is a 1983 clone from Computer Shack for the TRS-80 Color Computer. Two clones, both called Space Pilot but otherwise unrelated, were released in 1984 and 1986: from Kingsoft for the Commodore 16 and Commodore 64 and Superior Software for the BBC Micro. Vector Pilot is a 2011 hobbyist-written clone for the Vectrex console.
