= List of ColecoVision games =

Games for the ColecoVision console

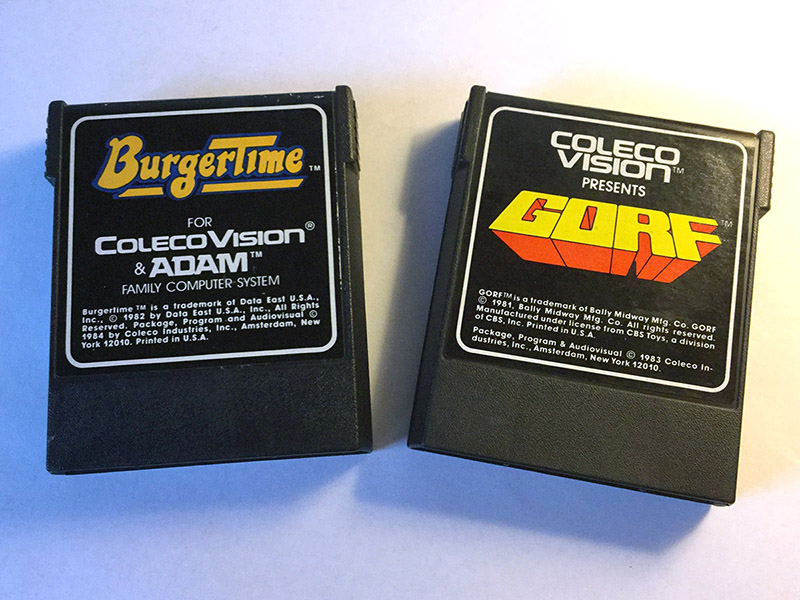
Two game cartridges by Coleco: BurgerTime (left) and Gorf

The ColecoVision is a video game console released in August 1982 by the toy company Coleco. 146 games were released for the system during its retail lifetime. Coleco also released several expansions and controllers for the system, including a steering wheel controller released as Expansion Module #2, a trackball controller released as the Roller Controller, and a set of handgrip controllers known as the Super Action Controllers. Several games were designed for and in some cases require these controllers. In late 1983, Coleco released the Coleco Adam, a home computer that was entirely backwards compatible with the ColecoVision. Many later releases were developed for both platforms.

The ColecoVision also shared it's CPU (the Zilog Z80) and graphics chip (the TMS9928) with several other contemporary machines including Spectravideo's SV-318 and SV-328 home computers, the MSX home computer standard, and Sega's SG-1000 home console. Though not exactly the same, the similar hardware allowed a number of games to be ported directly between these systems.

In total, the following games are known to exist:

- 129 (Note: This number is always up to date by this script.) U.S. releases
- 1 U.S. very limited release
- 7 (Note: This number is always up to date by this script.) foreign/Canadian releases
- 9 (Note: This number is always up to date by this script.) TeleGames exclusive releases

== Official ==
=== U.S. ===
The following 129 (Note: This number is always up to date by this script.) games were released on the U.S. market:

Originally released for	Description	Count
Arcades	Initially released as an arcade machine	44
Home Consoles	Initially released on any home console	51
Home Computers	Initially or simultaneously released for home computers	34
Total		129

Title	Developer	Publisher	Release Date	Also available for			Ref.
Title	Developer	Publisher	Release Date	2600	INTV	5200	Ref.
2010: The Graphic Action Game (Note: Based on the film 2010: The Year We Make Contact)	Tom Fulton	Coleco	January 1985	No	No	No	
The Activision Decathlon	Action Graphics	Activision	August 1984	Yes	No	Yes	
Alphabet Zoo		Spinnaker Software	July 1984	No	No	No	
Antarctic Adventure (Note: Based on an MSX game by Konami.)	Konami	Coleco	August 1984	No	No	No	
Aquattack		Interphase	May 1984	No	No	No	
Artillery Duel (Note: Also released as double-ender cartridge with Chuck Norris Superkicks.)	Action Graphics (Note: As printed in the game's manual.)	Xonox	October 1984	Yes	No	No	
B.C.'s Quest for Tires	Sydney	Sierra	November 1983	No	No	No	
B.C. II: Grog's Revenge	Sydney	Sierra	March 1985	No	No	No	
Beamrider	Action Graphics	Activision	March 1984	Yes	Yes	Yes	
Blockade Runner		Interphase	May 1984	No	Yes	No	
Brain Strainers	Carousel Software	Coleco	October 1984	No	No	No	
Buck Rogers: Planet of Zoom		Coleco	March 1984	Yes	No	Yes	
Bump 'n' Jump (Note: Optionally supports the Expansion Module #2 steering wheel controller.)	Nice Ideas	Coleco	June 1984	Yes	Yes	No	
BurgerTime	Nice Ideas	Coleco	May 1984	Yes	Yes	No	
Cabbage Patch Kids: Adventures in the Park	Konami	Coleco	May 1984	No	No	No	
Cabbage Patch Kids Picture Show	O.A.A.	Coleco	January 1985	No	No	No	
Campaign '84	VSS	Sunrise Software	February 1984	No	No	No	
Carnival		Coleco	October 1982	Yes	Yes	No	
Centipede	Atari Inc.	Atarisoft	December 1983	Yes	Yes	Yes	
Choplifter!		Coleco	January 1985	No	No	Yes	
Chuck Norris Superkicks (Note: Also released as a double-ender cartridge with Artillery Duel.)	VSS	Xonox	October 1984	Yes	No	No	
Congo Bongo		Coleco	October 1984	Yes	Yes	Yes	
Cosmic Avenger		Coleco	September 1982	No	No	No	
The Dam Busters	Sydney	Coleco	March 1985	No	No	No	
Dance Fantasy	WCI Labs (Atari)	Fisher-Price	1984	No	No	No	
Defender	Atari Inc.	Atarisoft	December 1983	Yes	Yes	Yes	
Destructor (Note: Requires the Expansion Module #2 steering wheel controller.)		Coleco	May 1984	No	No	No	
Donkey Kong (Note: Released as the pack-in title.)		Coleco	August 1982	Yes	Yes	No	
Donkey Kong Jr.		Coleco	February 1983	Yes	Yes	No	
Dr. Seuss' Fix-Up the Mix-Up Puzzler		Coleco	October 1984	No	No	No	
Dragonfire	Dave Ross (Note: As printed on the game's box.)	Imagic	June 1984	Yes	Yes	No	
The Dukes of Hazzard		Coleco	August 1984	No	No	No	
Facemaker (Note: A smaller box variant was also released with the name "Make-A-Face".)		Spinnaker Software	May 1984	No	No	No	
Fathom	Mark Voorsanger	Imagic	June 1984	Yes	Yes	No	
Flipper Slipper (Note: Originally released for the Spectravideo SVI-318 and SV-328 home computers.)		Spectravideo	1984	No	No	No	
Fortune Builder	Circuits and Systems	Coleco	October 1984	No	No	No	
Fraction Fever		Spinnaker Software	May 1984	No	No	No	
Frantic Freddy		Spectravideo	November 1983	No	No	No	
Frenzy	Davis & Nussrallah & Associates	Coleco	February 1984	No	No	No	
Frogger	JWDA	Parker Brothers	October 1983	Yes	Yes	Yes	
Frogger II: ThreeeDeep!		Parker Brothers	October 1984	Yes	No	Yes	
Front Line (Note: Designed to use the Super Action Controllers.)	Nuvatec	Coleco	December 1983	Yes	No	No	
Galaxian	Atari Inc.	Atarisoft	April 1984	Yes	No	Yes	
Gateway to Apshai		Epyx	March 1984	No	No	No	
Gorf	Nuvatec	Coleco	May 1983	Yes	Yes	Yes	
Gust Buster	VSS	Sunrise Software	February 1984	No	No	No	
Gyruss		Parker Brothers	June 1984	Yes	No	Yes	
H.E.R.O.	The Softworks	Activision	August 1984	Yes	No	Yes	
The Heist	Mike Livesay	Micro Fun	March 1984	No	No	No	
Illusions	Nice Ideas	Coleco	March 1985	No	No	No	
It's Only Rock 'n' Roll	Emag	Xonox	1984	No	No	No	
James Bond 007	On-Time Software	Parker Brothers	May 1984	Yes	No	Yes	
Jukebox		Spinnaker Software	1984	No	No	No	
Jumpman Junior		Epyx	March 1984	No	No	No	
Jungle Hunt	Atari Inc.	Atarisoft	April 1984	Yes	No	Yes	
Ken Uston Blackjack/Poker		Coleco	June 1983	No	No	No	
Keystone Kapers	Sydney	Activision	June 1984	Yes	No	Yes	
Lady Bug	Nuvatec	Coleco	September 1982	No	Yes	No	
Learning with Leeper		Sierra	May 1984	No	No	No	
Linking Logic		Fisher-Price	1984	No	No	No	
Logic Levels		Fisher-Price	1984	No	No	No	
Looping	Nuvatec	Coleco	May 1983	No	No	No	
Memory Manor		Fisher-Price	November 1984	No	No	No	
Miner 2049er	Mike Livesay	Micro Fun	August 1983	Yes	No	Yes	
Monkey Academy	Konami	Coleco	October 1984	No	No	No	
Montezuma's Revenge		Parker Brothers	October 1984	Yes	No	Yes	
Moonsweeper	Wendell Brown	Imagic	March 1984	Yes	No	No	
Motocross Racer (Note: Also released as a double-ender cartridge with Tomarc the Barbarian.)	VSS	Xonox	1984	Yes	No	No	
Mountain King	VSS	Sunrise Software	October 1984	Yes	No	Yes	
Mouse Trap		Coleco	November 1982	Yes	Yes	No	
Mr. Do!		Coleco	August 1983	Yes	No	No	
Mr. Do!'s Castle		Parker Brothers	October 1984	Yes	No	Yes	
Nova Blast	Clinton Ballard	Imagic	August 1983	No	Yes	No	
Oil's Well		Sierra	March 1984	No	No	No	
Omega Race		Coleco	October 1983	Yes	No	No	
One on One Basketball		Micro Fun	January 1985	No	No	No	
Pepper II	4D Interactive Systems	Coleco	May 1983	No	No	No	
Pitfall!	Action Graphics	Activision	February 1984	Yes	Yes	Yes	
Pitfall II: Lost Caverns		Activision	October 1984	Yes	No	Yes	
Pitstop	Action Graphics	Epyx	November 1983	No	No	No	
Popeye		Parker Brothers	August 1983	Yes	Yes	Yes	
Q*bert	Adrenalin Entertainment	Parker Brothers	August 1983	Yes	Yes	Yes	
Q*bert's Qubes	JWDA	Parker Brothers	April 1985	Yes	No	No	
Quest for Quintana Roo	VSS	Sunrise Software	February 1984	Yes	No	Yes	
River Raid	Sydney	Activision	February 1984	Yes	Yes	Yes	
Robin Hood (Note: Also released as a double-ender cartridge with Sir Lancelot.)	Computer Magic	Xonox	1984	Yes	No	No	
Roc'n Rope	Gordon Martin & Associates	Coleco	June 1984	Yes	No	No	
Rocky Super Action Boxing	Action Graphics	Coleco	October 1983	No	No	No	
Rolloverture	VSS	Sunrise Software	May 1984	No	No	No	
Sammy Lightfoot		Sierra	March 1984	No	No	No	
Sector Alpha		Spectravideo	1984	No	No	No	
Sewer Sam		Interphase	March 1984	No	Yes	No	
Sir Lancelot (Note: Also released as a double-ender cartridge with Robin Hood.)	VSS	Xonox	1984	Yes	No	No	
Slither (Note: Bundled with the Roller Controller wich is required to play.)	Nuvatec	Coleco	October 1983	No	No	No	
Slurpy	Emag	Xonox	1984	No	No	No	
Smurf Paint 'n' Play Workshop	Innoventions	Coleco	August 1984	No	No	No	
Smurf: Rescue in Gargamel's Castle		Coleco	September 1982	Yes	No	No	
Space Fury		Coleco	March 1983	No	No	No	
Space Panic		Coleco	April 1983	No	No	No	
Spectron		Spectravideo	November 1983	No	No	No	
Spy Hunter	4D Interactive Systems	Coleco	January 1985	Yes	No	No	
Squish 'em		Interphase	March 1984	No	No	No	
Star Trek: Strategic Operations Simulator		Coleco	c. May 1984	Yes	No	Yes	
Star Wars: The Arcade Game		Parker Brothers	June 1984	Yes	No	Yes	
SubRoc	4D Interactive Systems	Coleco	October 1983	No	No	No	
Super Action Baseball (Note: Bundled with the Super Action Controllers.)	Gordon Martin & Associates	Coleco	June 1983	No	No	No	
Super Action Football	Davis & Nussrallah & Associates	Coleco	June 1984	No	No	No	
Super Cobra		Parker Brothers	March 1984	Yes	Yes	Yes	
Super Cross Force		Spectravideo	November 1983	No	No	No	
Super Sketch (Note: Bundled with the Super Sketch Pad.)		Practical Peripherals	March 1985	No	No	No	
Tapper; Root Beer Tapper		Coleco	January 1985	Yes	No	No	
Tarzan	4D Interactive Systems	Coleco	August 1984	No	No	No	
Telly Turtle (Note: Teaches the basics of the Logo programming language.)	Carousel Software	Coleco	c. April 1984	No	No	No	
Threshold		Sierra	May 1984	Yes	No	No	
Time Pilot	Nuvatec	Coleco	August 1983	Yes	No	No	
Tomarc the Barbarian (Note: Also released as a double-ender cartridge with Motocross Racer.)	Emag	Xonox	1984	Yes	No	No	
Tournament Tennis	D & L Research	Imagic	December 1984	No	No	No	
Turbo (Note: Bundled with the Expansion Module #2 steering wheel controller, which is required.)	Nuvatec	Coleco	November 1982	No	Yes	No	
Tutankham		Parker Brothers	February 1984	Yes	Yes	No	
Up'n Down	On-Time Software	Sega	January 1985	No	No	No	
Venture		Coleco	September 1982	Yes	Yes	No	
Victory (Note: Requires the Roller Controller.)	Nuvatec	Coleco	October 1983	No	No	No	
WarGames		Coleco	May 1984	No	No	No	
War Room	Robert S. Harris	Probe 2000	October 1983	No	No	No	
Wing War	Alan Smith	Imagic	November 1983	Yes	No	No	
The Wizard of Id's Wiz Math	Sydney	Sierra	1984	No	No	No	
Word Feud	Emag	Xonox	1984	No	No	No	
Zaxxon	4D Interactive Systems	Coleco	October 1982	Yes	Yes	Yes	
Zenji	Action Graphics	Activision	October 1984	No	No	Yes	

=== U.S. limited release ===
The following game received a very limited release in the US:

Title	Released	Genre	Developer	Publisher	Notes
The Cat Scheduled Oil Sampling Game	1983	Action, simulation	Nuvatec	Caterpillar Inc	Not sold commercially. Given to Caterpillar dealerships to support the S.O.S. program. The customers played it while waiting in the lobby.

=== Non-US ===
The following games were exclusively released in non-US markets:

Title	Released	Genre	Developer	Publisher	Notes
Cosmic Crisis	1983	Platform		Bit Corp.	Europe
Energy Quizz		Education	Sydney		Energy, Mines, and Resources Canada
Evolution	1983	Action	Sydney	Coleco of Canada	Canada
Meteoric Shower	1983	Fixed shooter		Bit Corp.	Europe
Super Action Football	1984	Sports		CBS Electronics	Not same as U.S. game with same name. This is a soccer simulation.
Strike It!	1983	Breakout clone		Bit Corp.	Europe
Tank Wars	1983	Maze, shooter		Bit Corp.	Europe

=== Dina / Telegames ===
Dina is a clone of both the ColecoVision and the Sega SG-1000 consoles, with one cartridge slot for each platform, and came bundled with the game Meteoric Shower, which was built into the system. It was later sold in the United States by Telegames as the Telegames Personal Arcade.

The following games were in the ColecoVision format:

Title	Released	Genre	Developer	Publisher	Notes
Alcazar: The Forgotten Fortress	1985	Action, adventure	Cheshire Engineering	Telegames	Developed by Tom Loughry for Activision. Exclusive to Telegames.
Amazing Bumpman	1986	Education, maze	VSS	Telegames	Exclusive to Telegames.
Boulder Dash	1984	Maze	Micro Lab	Telegames	Developed for Micro Fun. Exclusive to Telegames.
Cosmic Crisis	1986	Platform		Telegames	Same as foreign game by Bit Corp.
Kung Fu Superkicks		Side-scrolling combat	VSS	Telegames	Sames as Chuck Norris Superkicks by Xonox.
Rock 'N Bolt	1984	Action puzzle	Action Graphics	Telegames	Developed for Activision. Exclusive to Telegames.
Skiing	1986	Sports		Telegames	Exclusive to Telegames.
Strike It!	1986	Breakout clone		Telegames	Same as foreign game by Bit Corp.
Tank Wars	1986	Maze shooter		Telegames	Same as foreign game by Bit Corp.

== Unreleased prototypes ==
- Dig Dug (Atarisoft)
- PAC-MAN (Atarisoft)
- Joust (Atarisoft)
