= CBS Electronics =

Defunct video game division of CBS

- Corporate logo
- Type: Subsidiary
- Industry: Video games
- Founded: 1982; 44 years ago
- Defunct: 1983
- Successor: CBS Software
- Headquarters: Connecticut, United States
- Key people: Robert Hunter; Richard Baumbusch
- Products: Mountain King; Tunnel Runner; Wizard of Wor
- Owner: Gabriel Industries
- Number of employees: 25

CBS Electronics, initially named CBS Video Games, was a division of Gabriel Industries, the toy division of the American television network CBS. It was formed in 1982 to sell video games for the Atari 2600. It was later merged with CBS Software, initially a separate division of the company dedicated to home computer software. Many of the company's titles were licensed ports of arcade games by Bally Midway, who developed many of these ports internally with assistance from Roklan Software. The company also published titles from K-Byte, such as K-Razy Shoot-Out and Mountain King, and distributed the ColecoVision and its games in Europe. American football personality John Madden was signed on as a spokesperson for the division.

CBS Electronics was initially directed by Robert Hunter, a 28-year-old vice president who managed a small development team in Stafford, Connecticut. In addition to video games such as Gorf, Wizard of Wor, and Tunnel Runner, the team also developed hardware such as the RAM Plus chip that expanded the RAM capacity of the Atari 2600. The company was abruptly shuttered at the end of 1983 due to the video game crash of 1983. The remains were merged with CBS Software which continued to publish games up through 1985. CBS Software focused on educational and productivity software, in addition to games based on Sesame Street and Dr. Seuss.

== History ==
=== Creation ===
In 1982, a 28-year-old CBS employee named Robert Hunter was put in charge of a new video game division of Gabriel Industries, the toy division of CBS. Hunter was a graduate of MIT and had been an employee of CBS for eight years. According to CBS Electronics programmer, Stuart Ross, Hunter's claim to fame was signing the rock band Journey to Columbia Records, owned by CBS at the time. CBS Colombia Group president Thomas Kerwin pushed Hunter to try to "figure out ways for CBS to distribute its computer-based information." Kerwin helped Hunter establish this new division, named CBS Video Games, which began developing video games for the Atari 2600. Former American football coach John Madden became a spokesperson for the project.

By August 1982, CBS had announced the creation of this new division as well as a licensing agreement with the arcade manufacturer Bally Midway. CBS promised to publish ports of its arcade games including Gorf and Wizard of Wor which were planned for launch by Christmas. These games had previously been licensed to Astrocade, the company distributing Bally's original home console, who's license expired right before their own versions were released for that console.

=== Game development ===
According to Ross, the development group, which had previously developed electronic toys, was headed by Trevor Marshall and based out of Connecticut. At its peak it had 25 employees. Ross helped direct the development of CBS's initial ports, which were developed internally at Bally Midway with assistance from Roklan Software, according to then Midway programmer Bob Curtiss. On August 12th 1982, CBS also announced a distribution partnership with K-Byte, a software developer responsible for K-Razy Shoot-Out and later Mountain King.

At Winter CES 1983, CBS announced Blue Print, Solar Fox, and another game called Stomp It which never released. They also announced development on two internally developed games, Tunnel Runner and Wings. These two games were developed by CBS employees Dick Balaska and Stuart Ross respectively. They were based around a new cartridge design featuring the RAM Plus chip, which improved game visuals by providing 256 bytes of additional RAM for the Atari 2600 to use.

=== Name change ===
In mid 1983, CBS Video Games changed its name to CBS Electronics and announced it would be publishing for both consoles and home computers. CBS Software, which was already publishing computer games would instead focus exclusively on educational and non-game software. Robert Hunter was also replaced by Richard Baumbusch (a former marketing director at Mattel) as vice president, which CBS representatives claimed was not a demotion, claiming Hunter was a "start-up man...and his leaving is all according to plan."

CBS Electronics also published ports of their games for other platforms. CBS served as the international distributor for Coleco, distributing the ColecoVision and its games in Europe. In the United States, Gorf, Omega Race, and Wizard of Wor were published for the ColecoVision by Coleco themselves. In addition at Summer CES 1983, eight Intellivision games were announced as well as five Atari 5200 games. Their final Bally Midway title was Omega Race, which came with a joystick adapter called the Booster Grip which provides a second fire button.

=== Closure ===
Following Omega Race's release in December 1983 and facing losses due to the video game crash of 1983, CBS announced that it was "repositioning" the CBS Electronics staff and all new console game development would cease. CBS Electronics became a part of CBS Software which continued to publish software for a few more years. According to Stuart Ross, the entire team was laid off all at once and restrained in a room with security guards while their offices were locked to prevent sabotage.

== CBS Software ==
Initially created as a separate division from CBS Video Games, CBS Software was dedicated to home computer software. It was associated with the educational and professional publishing division of CBS. They initially published many titles by K-Byte and Bally Midway. They also panned to release titles in four other categories: Education, Enrichment, Entertainment, and Home Management. CBS Software published a number of educational games using Sesame Street and Dr. Seuss characters.

== Games ==
=== Released by CBS Electronics ===
Title	Developer	Release Date	Platforms	Ref.
Blue Print		July 1983	Atari 2600, Atari 5200	
Gorf	Bally Midway	December 1982	Atari 8-bit, Atari 2600, Atari 5200	
K-Razy Shoot-Out	K-Byte	October 1983 (Note: Atari 5200 release date. Computer version released in 1981.)	Atari 8-bit, Atari 5200	
Mountain King	K-Byte	June 1983	Atari 8-bit, Atari 2600, Atari 5200	
Omega Race		December 1983	Atari 2600	
Solar Fox	Bally Midway	July 1983	Atari 2600	
Tunnel Runner	CBS	December 1983	Atari 2600	
Wizard of Wor	Roklan	December 1982	Atari 2600, Atari 5200, Atari 8-bit	

=== Released by CBS Software ===
Title	Developer	Copyright	Platforms	Ref.
Adventure Master	Christopher Chance	1984	Apple II, Atari 8-bit, Commodore 64, MS-DOS	
America: Coast to Coast	Neosoft	1984	Apple II, Commodore 64	
The Argos Expedition	Children's Computer Workshop	1984	Commodore 64	
Astro-Grover	Children's Computer Workshop	1984	Atari 8-bit, Commodore 64	
Big Bird's Funhouse	Children's Computer Workshop	1984	Atari 8-bit, Commodore 64	
Big Bird's Special Delivery	Children's Computer Workshop	1983	Atari 8-bit	
The Body in Focus	Neosoft	1985	Apple II, Commodore 64, MS-DOS	
Boulders and Bombs	K-Byte	1983	Atari 8-bit	
Charles Goren: Learning Bridge Made Easy	Goren International	1983	Apple II, Commodore 64, MS-DOS	
Coco-Notes	The Dovetail Group	1984	Atari 8-bit, Commodore 64	
Dinosaur Dig	Neosoft	1984	Atari 8-bit, Commodore 64	
Dr. Seuss' Fix-Up the Mix-Up Puzzler	Coleco	1984	Apple II, Atari 8-bit, Commodore 64	
Ducks Ahoy!	Joyce Hakansson Associates	1984	Atari 8-bit, Commodore 64	
Ernie's Magic Shapes	Children's Computer Workshop	1984	Atari 8-bit, Commodore 64, MS-DOS	
Ernie's Big Splash	Children's Computer Workshop	1985	Commodore 64	
Fleet Feet	Children's Computer Workshop	1984	Commodore 64	
Grover's Animal Adventures	Children's Computer Workshop	1985	Commodore 64	
Halftime Battlin' Bands	The Dovetail Group	1984	Atari 8-bit, Commodore 64	
K-Razy Antiks	K-Byte	1982	Atari 8-bit, VIC-20	
K-Razy Kritters	K-Byte	1982	Atari 8-bit	
K-Star Patrol	K-Byte	1982	Atari 8-bit, VIC-20	
Light-Waves	Children's Computer Workshop	1984	Commodore 64	
Match Wits	David Cooper	1983	Apple II, Atari 8-bit, Commodore 64, MS-DOS	
Math Mileage	K-Byte	1984	Atari 8-bit	
Movie Musical Madness	The Dovetail Group	1984	Atari 8-bit, Commodore 64	
Mystery Master: Felony!	BrainBank	1984	Apple II, Commodore 64	
Mystery Master: Murder by the Dozen	BrainBank	1983	Apple II, Commodore 64, Macintosh, MS-DOS	
Pathwords	Eon Software	1984	Apple II, Commodore 64	
Peanut Butter Panic	Children's Computer Workshop	1983	Atari 8-bit, Commodore 64	
Quink	Ron Dubren and Associates	1985	Apple II, Commodore 64, MS-DOS	
The Railroad Works	The Connelley Group	1985	Apple II, Commodore 64	
Richard Scarry's Best Electronic Word Book Ever!	Coleco	1984	Apple II, Commodore 64	
Sea Horse Hide'n Seek	Joyce Hakansson Associates	1984	Atari 8-bit, Commodore 64	
The Sea Voyagers	Neosoft	1984	Apple II, Commodore 64, MS-DOS	
Sesame Street: Letter-Go-Round	Children's Computer Workshop	1984	Atari 8-bit, Commodore 64	
T.rex: The Dinosaur Survival Adventure	Keron Productions	1984	Apple II	
Timebound	Children's Computer Workshop	1983	Atari 8-bit, Commodore 64, MS-DOS	
Weather Tamers	Children's Computer Workshop	1984	Commodore 64	
Webster: The Word Game	Heuristic Software	1983	Apple II, Atari 8-bit, Commodore 64, MS-DOS	

=== Licensed by Coleco for foreign distribution ===
Title	Release Date	Platforms	Ref.
Cabbage Patch Kids: Adventures in the Park	1984	ColecoVision	
Carnival	Q2 1983	Colecovision, Atari 2600, Intellivision	
Cosmic Avenger	Q2 1983	ColecoVision	
Donkey Kong	Q2 1983	ColecoVision, Atari 2600, Intellivision	
Donkey Kong Junior	Q2 1983	ColecoVision	
Frenzy	1984	ColecoVision	
Gorf	Q4 1983	ColecoVision	
Lady Bug	Q2 1983	ColecoVision, Intellivision	
Looping	Q4 1983	ColecoVision	
Mouse Trap	Q2 1983	ColecoVision, Atari 2600, Intellivision	
Pepper II	Q4 1983	ColecoVision	
Smurf: Rescue in Gargamel's Castle	Q2 1983	ColecoVision, Atari 2600	
Space Fury	Q4 1983	ColecoVision	
Space Panic	Q4 1983	ColecoVision	
SubRoc	1984	ColecoVision	
Time Pilot	1984	ColecoVision	
Turbo	Q2 1983	ColecoVision	
Venture	Q2 1983	ColecoVision, Atari 2600, Intellivision	
Zaxxon	Q2 1983	ColecoVision, Intellivision	
Wizard of Wor	Q4 1983	ColecoVision	
