= Gorf =

1981 video game

- Arcade flyer
- Developer: Dave Nutting Associates
- Publishers: Midway Manufacturing: Atari 8-bit, 2600, 5200; CBS Video Games; ColecoVision; Coleco
- Designer: Jamie Fenton
- Platforms: Arcade, Atari 8-bit, Atari 2600, BBC Micro, ColecoVision, Atari 5200, Commodore 64, VIC-20
- Release: February 1981: Arcade; February 1981; Atari 2600; December 1982; ColecoVision; May 1983; Atari 5200; October 1983
- Genre: Fixed shooter
- Modes: Single-player, multiplayer

Gorf is a 1981 fixed shooter video game developed by Dave Nutting Associates and published by Midway Manufacturing for arcades. It features five distinct levels, the first of which is based on Space Invaders and another on Galaxian. The game makes use of synthesized speech for the Gorfian robot which taunts the player, powered by a speech chip. Gorf allows the player to buy two additional lives per quarter before starting the game, for a maximum of seven lives.

The home ports omit the Galaxians stage because Japanese developer Namco (now Bandai Namco Entertainment) owns the rights to the Galaxian franchise.

== Gameplay ==
Astro Battles, the game's first mission

Gorf is a fixed shooter in which the player takes control of an unnamed starship from the Interstellar Space Force with a mission to prevent the iron-fisted Empire of GORF from conquering Earth. The ship is capable of moving freely in all directions around the lower third of the screen under the control of a joystick. This was a departure from older vertically oriented linear shooters, including Space Invaders and Galaxian, which allowed only horizontal movement of the player's ship controlled by left and right buttons. At the time, the joystick input and two-dimensional movement were still unusual enough that contemporary video game guides noted them as distinctive features of Gorf.

Gameplay consists of five distinct missions; every mission presents its own unique playstyle, but the central goal of each is to destroy all enemies. Successfully completing all five missions loops the player back to the first mission and also increases the player's rank, which represents the current difficulty level of the game. Gameplay continues until the player loses all of their lives.

Before starting a new game, players can buy up to seven additional lives by purchasing more credits; an extra life is also granted after clearing the first five missions. Unlike similar games where the player can only shoot their weapon after an existing shot has disappeared from the screen, the ship is equipped with a laser cannon capable of firing a single vertical shot (called a "quark laser") at any time, although doing so causes the previous shot to disappear.

Players can advance through the ranks of Space Cadet, Space Captain, Space Colonel, Space General, Space Warrior and Space Avenger, which increases the speed and difficulty of the game and introduces more enemy patterns. Depending on the version, the player's current rank is displayed via a series of integrated lit panels on the cabinet.

=== Missions ===
1. Astro Battles: A clone of Space Invaders; it is the only mission that takes place on Earth instead of space. 24 enemies attack in the classic pattern set by the original game; however, the player is protected by a parabolic force field that switches off temporarily when the player's shots pass through it and is gradually worn away by enemy fire.
2. Laser Attack: The first mission set in space, where the player must battle two formations of five enemies. Each formation contains three yellow enemies that attempt to dive-bomb the player, a white gunner that fires a single laser beam, and a red miniature version of the Gorf robot.
3. Galaxians: As the name implies, this mission is a clone of Galaxian, with the key differences being the number of enemies and the way they fire at the player. Gameplay is otherwise similar to the original game.
4. Space Warp: This mission places the player in a sort of wormhole, where enemies fly outward from the center of the screen and attempt to either shoot down or collide with the player's ship. It is possible to destroy enemy shots in this level.
5. Flag Ship: The Flag Ship is protected by its own force field, similar to the one protecting the player in Mission 1, and it flies back and forth firing at the player. To defeat it, the player must break through the force field and destroy the ship's core. As with the alien ship in Phoenix, the bottom of the flag ship must be blasted away to expose the vulnerable core. If a different part of the ship is hit, the player receives bonus points, and the part breaks off and flies in a random direction, potentially posing a risk to the player's ship. When the player successfully hits the core, the Flag Ship explodes in a dramatic display, the player advances to the next rank, and play continues on Mission One (Astro Battles), with the difficulty increased. Later encounters with the Flag Ship on higher ranks include additional enemies during the mission.

== Development ==
=== Background and pre-production ===
Gorf was developed by Jamie Fenton of Dave Nutting Associates (DNA). DNA had become Research and development consultants for Midway Manufacturing at the beginning of the 1970s, and they had developed several arcade games such as Gun Fight (1975), a reworking of Taito's game Western Gun. Around this period, Nutting was working on a light gun-based game where the player would attempt to shoot a character he initially christened "Gorf". The game eventually developed into Desert Gun (1977).

Fenton had worked with DNA initially to work on pinball machines. She was a co-creator on some early arcade games such as The Amazing Maze Game (1976) and 280 ZZZAP (1977) and led the team who created an early video game console, the Bally Astrocade. Some of the custom integrated circuits for the system were manipulated and later re-used in Gorf. This included customized LSI Framebuffer chip sets. These chips allowed for Exclusive or writing of images which allowed objects on the screen to pass in front of or behind other objects and backgrounds.

Some chips allowed for digitized speech that taunted the player with phrases like "Long live Gorf!" and "Prepare for annihilation, Space Cadet!" The speech originated in chips designed for the Bally console. Fenton recalled that "Quite a few were on the blue end of the spectrum but they still had obscenity laws back then! They had to be clean but still annoying enough to serve their purpose. My favourite? "Your end is near". That gets a lot of double entendres."

Gorf began as a video game adaptation of the film Star Trek: The Motion Picture (1979). Fenton was initially excited on the idea of an adaptation, but abandoned the idea after reading the script for the film, and deciding that they could not draw a great idea for a video game from the script. She only used some leftover elements such as the boss flagship in Gorf resembling the USS Enterprise.

=== Level design ===
Fenton took over a year to develop the game with most of Gorf from home, to avoid interacting with her boss in the office. During this period in video games, most games levels required players just to do the same task but in faster time, less resources, or with more enemies. Influenced by director D.W. Griffith, Fenton felt that Gorf should be like "cutting from one scene to another" and desired to make a multi-episodic game.

She created three original levels, and two that borrowed from other arcade games. As Midway Manufacturing had arrangements with the Japanese companies Taito and Namco to distribute their games Space Invaders (1978) and Galaxian (1979) in the United States, they took creative license and used elements from each game as different-styled levels in Gorf. These scenes have slight variations on the gameplay in both games, such as the group of enemies from Galaxian swooping en masse towards the players space ship. The first level features a blue screen to represent Earth. It uses the Space Invaders elements is titled "Astro Battles". Fenton explained that the name change was done in order to "not promote that brand too much". The third level Galaxians with its extra s in its title attributed to being a misspelling on Fenton's part.

The boss fight with the Gorfian flagship was inspired by the trench run scene in Star Wars (1977). Fenton joked that "back then, people would shamelessly use other people's ideas."

The cabinet art was done by David Moore of Advertising Posters in Chicago.

== Release ==
Gorf field tested alongside Pac-Man (1980) in the United States. Gorf was published by Midway Manufacturing and distributed to arcades in the United States in February 1981.

George Gomez, who joined Midway after graduating in 1978, began work with other Midway engineers on controls and cabinets for the company, including the controller for Gorf. The game was released in three different sizes of Midway model arcade cabinets. The first was their standard model that featured graphics on the outside of the cabinet, the second being a smaller scaled model with a walnut finish made for saving space in an arcade, and the last being a cocktail table styled cabinet. At the time, the Gorf controller was unique as it had the fire button built into the pistol grip. Fenton stated that the controller was derived from a B-1 bomber design Dave Nutting’s team had previously produced for the defense industry.

=== Ports ===
Gorf was coded for the Commodore 64 by programmer Eric Cotton. In April 1982, Roklan Corporation announced it would release Gorf for various home computers. Roklan developed the port for the Atari 400 and 800 computers as well as the Atari 2600 port for CBS Video Games. For the port for the ColecoVision console, Gorf went through 39 changes before being accepted. Coleco's product evaluator, Jodi McIlroy, said that all these changes were relatively small as they were trying to make it just right before releasing it.

A version of Gorf for the Atari 2600 was written by Alex Leavens and released in December 1982. In 1983, Coleco published a version of Gorf for the ColecoVision in May while CBS published a version for the Atari 5200 in October.

In late 1982, CBS Video Games announced plans to release Gorf for the Intellivision in early 1983. The game was also ported to the BBC Micro, and VIC-20 by multiple developers between 1982 and 1983.

Fenton said that Galaxian was the first game Bally had lost rights to and suggested that this was the reason why ports of the game had not included the Galaxians level. The Commodore 64 port is the only one with synthesized speech—via the Magic Voice Speech module.

== Reception ==
In the September 1981 issue of Play Meter, which reflected sales from July 3, Gorf made number one on the arcade charts. In the immediately preceding and following polls, it was fifth and third, respectively. Gorf was described by Paul Drury in Retro Gamer as providing the distributor with its biggest arcade hit since Gun Fight. Fenton later described watching players smiling and continuously putting quarters into Gorf as "better than any drug I've ever taken".

Reviewing the original arcade game, Mark S. Murley of Hi-Res Magazine said that the arcade version of "Gorf is a powerful game, if for no other reason than the pace of the action. Many veterans of popular arcade games like Defender (1981) and Tempest quickly fall by the wayside when faced with "the intensity of the various attacking buguboos" in Gorf. In an overview of similar games that have followed the release of Space Invaders, The Winona Daily News stated that it has been surpassed by similar games such as Astro Invader (1979) and Galaxian (1979), while concluding that "the tops in the post-Invader generation may be Gorf".

Commenting on the arcade cabinet and device itself, Frank Seninsky of Play Meter considered the physical arcade and hardware as not being a well built arcade console, describing it as "slapped together". Seninsky reported that arcade operators had service problems with the machine due to the large joystick which could bang the cabinet forward back and into a wall. The reviewer in the magazine found the machine's art unattractive, finding the gray paint work on it was "one step better than using white" and the side decals arrived to arcades had chipped edges and bubbles underneath and were peeling off in a few days at an arcade location. In 1984, academic Thomas A. DeFanti of the University of Illinois Chicago described joystick in Gorf as "generally accepted as the best joystick" finding its unique shape had combated players receiving temporary indentations on them from the knobs featured on most joysticks of the period.

=== Ports ===
Reception

Review scores
Publication	Score		
Publication	Atari 2600	ColecoVision	VIC-20
Computer and Video Games		65%	3/10
Electronic Fun with Computers & Games	2/4	3.5/4	3/4
Home Computing Weekly			5/5
Video Games Player		B+	

Awards
Publication	Award
Video (1983)	Best Solitaire Video Game (2600)
Video (1984)	Best Computer Game Audio-Visual Effects (2600)

For the Atari 2600 port of the game, Hi Res Magazine found the game to be a "competent, de-frilled edition of Gorf", noting that it was missing elements of the arcade game, such as the scrolling message at the beginning of the game, the force field in the first level and removes a number of prompts and messages seen in the arcade game. A reviewer in The Video Game Update said that while it was not possible to port all the details from the arcade game, the developers had developed a game that played well and ultimately recommended the release. Video Games dismissed the release, noting weak challenge and graphics concluding that "this cartridge truly is a dog." Electronic Fun with Computers & Games said the game was not great and that its first level was a shameless rip-off of Space Invaders.

The ColecoVision version of the game, Electronic Games called it "perhaps the best home edition of Gorf to date" while finding its sound effects were not up to par with the arcade version. The Video Game Update also praised this port, specifically highlighting the graphics noting you could make out "smiles on the faces of some invaders".

For home computers, Charlene Komar of Electronic Games said many games for the VIC-20 were "not too original or exciting", while finding the VIC-20 port of Gorf to be one of the best games available for the computer noting its fast-paced gameplay. Electronic Fun with Computers & Games echoed this finding that "the only superiority on the part of the arcade game is that monstrous pistol-grip controller." Both the two previous reviewers and Ahoy! complimented the ports graphics. Mark S. Murley of Hi-Res Magazine said that the Atari 8-bit computer version of Gorf had "survived the passage from the arcade to your home computer" and that Roklan had done an exceptional job and that "the look and feel of the game is superb; it stands firmly on its own as a competent and entertaining piece of software." Neil Harris of Commodore Power/Play said that along with Wizard of Wor, Gorf was one of the best video games yet. Harris said he was hesitant that the speech capabilities in the Commodore 64 version would make the game "gimmicky", but said it enhanced the enjoyment of both games.

The Atari 2600 version of the game received a Certificate of Merit in the category of "Best Solitaire Video Game" at the 4th annual Arkie Awards, and received the "1984 Best Computer Game Audio-Visual Effects" award at the 5th Arkies the following year. At the 5th Arkies, the judges indicated that the Atari versions had out-polled both the ColecoVision and Commodore 64 versions of the game, and they suggested it is the game's "varied action" which "keeps players coming back again and again".

=== Retrospective ===
Reception

Review scores
Publication	Score		
Publication	Arcade	Atari 2600	C64
AllGame	4.5/5	2.5/5	2.5/5
Eurogamer	8/10		
The Video Games Guide	2/5		

Some retrospective reviews of the original arcade game complimented the innovations the game. Earl Green of the online game database AllGame wrote that the speech synthesis and colorful graphics as the highlights of Gorf, and that it was "historically important for being the first-ever multi-level arcade game". Spanner Spencer of Eurogamer praised the game for its varied gameplay, and "revolutionary concepts like digitized speech (that never shuts up, but does add to the sci-fi atmosphere superbly) and the option to buy extra lives as well as extra credits"

In his book The Video Game Guide (2013), author Matt Fox found the game too derivative of other similar arcade games of the era, specifically Space Invaders, Galaxian, as well as Tempest (1981) and Phoenix (1980).

Electronic Gaming Monthly (2006) included the game in their list of the Top 200 Best Games of All Time in 2006.

== Legacy ==
Along with Stratovox (1980), Taskete (1980), and Berzerk (1980), Gorf was one of the earliest video games with speech synthesis in arcade games.

Fenton's next game, The Adventures of Robby Roto! (1981) was not as successful financially in the arcades. This led to her to work on a sequel to Gorf. Fenton began developing a sequel titled Ms. Gorf that was coded in Forth. She used two Z80-based computers, with each handling the games code and animation respectively. The game was ultimately cancelled. Fenton described the unreleased game as "like a game you create as you play it", saying it featured levels where the ship was like a paintbrush, and could create obstacles on the playfield that would speed or slow the player down player. Fenton described the game had a few levels that "weren't well defined. It never really came together as a whole narrative the way Gorf did." The code for Ms. Gorf exists on 8" floppy disks labeled "RIP Ms. GORF 6/82 - 8/83". A pinball table of Gorf was planned that would be a hybrid of the video game version of Gorf as well as being a pinball game. Fenton said that the project only got as far as developing a breadboard for it before the game got "tied up in a patent battle" and was never completed.

In 2006, 3D Stooges Software Studios released an unlicensed port of Gorf for the Atari Jaguar CD titled Gorf Classic. This version of the game is the only home version of Gorf that contains all the levels that were in the original arcade game. The release was listed as being among the best titles for the Jaguar by Retro Gamer magazine in 2006 and Time Extension in 2023. Retro Gamer claimed the release of Gorf Classic spurred the interest in an independent development scene for the Jaguar.

== See also ==
- Golden age of arcade video games
