= Fraction Fever =

1983 video game

- Developer: Tom Snyder Productions
- Publisher: Spinnaker Software
- Designer: Tom Snyder
- Platforms: Atari 8-bit, ColecoVision, Commodore 64, TRS-80, ZX Spectrum
- Release: 1983
- Genre: Educational
- Mode: Single-player

Fraction Fever is an educational video game created by Tom Snyder Productions and published by Spinnaker Software in 1983. The TRS-80 version was sold through Radio Shack. The game involves moving a pogo stick laterally on a platform to find a fraction equivalent to the one shown on-screen.

== Reception ==
Ahoy! unfavorably reviewed the game, criticizing the graphics and "very annoying" sound and stating that "Other than the Chinese water torture, I'm hard pressed to think of a more frustrating or annoying experience for children than trying to play Spinnaker's Fraction Fever. Just ask my kids!" InfoWorld's Essential Guide to Atari Computers recommended the game among educational software for the Atari 8-bit.
