= Alcazar: The Forgotten Fortress =

1985 video game

- Developer: Activision
- Publisher: Activision
- Designer: Tom Loughry
- Platforms: Apple II, Coleco Adam, ColecoVision, Commodore 64, MSX
- Release: 1985
- Genre: Action-adventure
- Mode: Single-player

Alcazar: The Forgotten Fortress is a dungeon action-adventure game released in 1985 for the Coleco Adam computer along with a port for the ColecoVision. It was created by Tom Loughry from Activision, graphics by Keri (Janssen) Longaway. The game was also ported to the Commodore 64 later.

== Plot ==
The plot of Alcazar is to get to the main castle "Alcazar", by going through multiple enemy castles, to retrieve the stolen Crown.

== Gameplay ==
The game starts on a world map, which contains 22 castles. The player's main goal is to move the character through the various castles to ultimately arrive at the main castle fortress on the right side of the map. Each castle has multiple rooms, traps and floors. The map and routes change every time a new game is started. The game has four difficulty levels: beginner, intermediate, advanced, and expert. Various items may also be obtained in the game, such as a pistol used for attacking or a "hook" that can be used to cross gaps. You also have a map in the bottom left corner, that can help prevent you from being lost in the castle dungeons.

There are also many traps or enemies present for the player to either fight or evade. If the player incurs too much damage, they lose a life, and losing all lives ends the game, though extra lives may also be obtained as well. The game has no "continues", and only the "Adam" version of the game supports saving.

== Reception ==
Ahoy! praised Alcazar's "beautifully written theme song", but stated that its graphics were insufficiently detailed. The magazine concluded that the game was "an enticing blend of mental and physical stimulation ... an electronic passport to hours of entertainment".

== Legacy ==
The game, specifically the MSX port, would later serve as an inspiration for the PlayStation title Resident Evil, with its mechanics of limited ammo per room.
