= Brain Strainers =

1983 video game

- Developer: Carousel Software
- Publishers: Carousel Software; Coleco
- Platforms: Atari 8-bit, Commodore 64, ColecoVision, Coleco Adam
- Release: Atari, C64; 1983; ColecoVision: NA: 1 June 1984
- Genre: Music
- Modes: Single-player, Multiplayer

Brain Strainers is a music video game released for the Atari 8-bit computers and Commodore 64 in 1983 and ColecoVision in 1984. It contains two sub-games, one of which is a clone of the popular 1970s audio game, Simon. It is notable for being one of the earliest music video games to employ pitch-based gameplay in the Clef Climber portion of the game.

== Gameplay ==
Brain Strainers consists of two musically themed sub-games: "Follow The Leader," and "Clef Climber." The intention of the game was to provide an educational video game experience. Skills that were targeted were eidetic musical memory and tonal accuracy.

=== Follow The Leader ===
Follow the Leader section gameplay (Atari 8-bit)

"Follow The Leader" is an eidetic music game designed to test the player's memory. Here, a pattern of musical notes are played and four colored panels light up correspondingly. The player then has a few seconds to repeat the sequence back to the computer. If the sequence is repeated correctly then the computer generates a longer string of notes to perform.

As the game progresses, the speeds at which the tune is performed and at which the response by the player must be given are increased. Further enhancing the difficulty of the game, the four colored panels cease to light up in higher levels.

=== Clef Climber ===
"Clef Climber" is a pitch-based video game where the player is given a reference note and then a tone corresponding to a different musical note that must be matched shortly after being played. As the game progresses, the reference note ceases to be played and the player must rely on his or her intuitive sense of pitch. The player can choose whether or not to view the notes on the musical staff, however even if musical notes are selected for display, they disappear at higher levels of the game.

== Reception ==
The game was recognized by Antic magazine for excellence in educational software

Ahoy! unfavorably reviewed Brain Strainers for the Commodore 64, stating that it "is a strain all right, but more on patience and interest than gray matter". It praised Clef Climber's graphics but criticized the documentation, which "must have been translated directly from Japanese, and poorly at that! What is the point of Clef Climber? I'm not sure". The magazine liked Finder's Keepers despite the poor graphics and lack of music, but stated that Follow the Leader "left me absolutely speechless. (Other than "idiotic," "pointless," and "ridiculous" for starters.)". It concluded "Brain Strainers is not worth your money, and, most importantly, not worth your kids' time".
