= Mountain King =

Mountain King may refer to:

- "In the Hall of the Mountain King", a musical composition by Edvard Grieg
- "The Mountain King" (Mad Men), 2008
- Mountain King (video game), 1983
- Mountain King Studios, a video game developer
- King asleep in mountain, a character archetype in folklore and mythology

== See also ==
- King of the Mountains
