= Blue Print (video game) =

1982 video game

- Arcade flyer
- Developer: Zilec Electronics
- Publishers: Bally Midway; CBS Electronics
- Designers: Tim Stamper; Chris Stamper; John Lathbury
- Platforms: Arcade, Atari 2600, Atari 5200, Commodore 64
- Release: September 1982: Arcade; September 1982; 2600; July 1983; 5200; October 1983; C64; 1983
- Genre: Maze
- Modes: Single-player, multiplayer

Blue Print is a 1982 maze video game developed by Zilec Electronics and published by Bally Midway for arcades. It was one of the first games to be designed by the Stamper brothers, future founders of Rare. Ports of Blue Print were published by CBS Electronics for the Atari 2600, Atari 5200, and Commodore 64 in 1983.

== Gameplay ==
Gameplay of Blue Print

The player controls J.J., a man whose girlfriend Daisy Damsel is being chased by Ollie Ogre. To defeat Ollie before he catches Daisy, J.J. must find all the parts of a machine he has designed, assemble it, and use it to shoot Ollie. Controls consist of a joystick and a button.

The screen is divided into three sections. At the top is a ledge on which Ollie chases the girl, occasionally knocking down flowerpots that may hit J.J. The center portion is a maze of 10 houses. The bottom contains the machine's blueprint, a "start button", and a pit. Eight of the houses contain one machine part each, while the other two contain bombs; the contents of a house are only revealed when J.J. enters it. If a part is found, the player must move it into the proper position on the blueprint. If a bomb is found, the player must carry it to the pit before it explodes. The player will always find a bomb in any previously visited house, but these will be red and have a shorter fuse. Holding the button down allows faster movement, but speed can be used only for a limited time as shown by an on-screen gauge. The gauge is partially refilled when setting a newly found part on the blueprint.

Once the machine is assembled, J.J. must step on the start button and then climb aboard the machine. The player must now use the joystick to maneuver left and right as it shoots balls upward. If Ollie is hit, he falls down and the level is complete, with bonus points awarded for each flowerpot remaining on the ledge. A new level then begins, with the houses in a different configuration. The first three levels are unique, but the fourth level and beyond use the same level layout.

J.J. must avoid falling flowerpots, both when they are knocked down and as they bounce across the lower screen. He must also occasionally deal with a monster named Sneaky Pete (Weird Willie on the C64 version) who peeks out before jumping out of the bomb pit and wandering towards the start button. If J.J. does not intercept Pete before he reaches the button, Pete starts stomping on it, causing the parts of the machine to fall off of the blueprint. J.J. must then drag Pete back to the pit and reassemble the fallen parts on the blueprint. Starting with the second level, J.J. also has to deal with another monster, Fuzzy Wuzzy (Maze Monster on the C64 version) who patrols the maze. If J.J. takes too long to assemble the machine and defeat Ollie, Ollie eventually catches up to Daisy and kisses her, causing J.J.'s heart to break and lose a life.
