= Adventure Master =

1984 computer program

- Developer: CBS Software
- Publisher: CBS Software
- Platforms: Apple II+/IIe/IIc, Atari XL/XE, Commodore 64, IBM Personal and PC/PCjr computers

Adventure Master was a system for writing text adventures with graphics. It was written by Christopher Chance and published by CBS Software in 1984. It ran on Apple II+/IIe/IIc, Atari, Commodore 64 and IBM Personal and PC/PCjr computers. It came with a few test adventures such as Clever Catacombs (by Christopher Chance), Becca in Outlaw Cave, and Wild Trails (by the author Jean Craighead George).
