= Fortune Builder =

1984 video game

- Developers: Circuits and Systems
- Publisher: Coleco Industries
- Platforms: ColecoVision, Coleco Adam
- Release: 1983
- Genre: Simulation
- Mode: Single-player

Fortune Builder is a 1984 simulation video game developed by Circuits and Systems and published by Coleco Industries for the ColecoVision. One of the only simulation titles available for the ColecoVision at the time, the game is an economic simulation in which the player builds a property empire through acquiring, developing and selling real estate. Publications have identified Fortune Builder as an early iteration of a simulation video game similar to the later Maxis title SimCity.

== Gameplay ==
The gameplay design of Fortune Builder has been identified as a precursor to SimCity.

Fortune Builder is a simulation of a real estate business. Players acquire land to develop into valuable properties by constructing buildings, including accommodation, restaurants, and resorts, represented by icons on a two-dimensional map. The value of constructed properties is modified by the terrain buildings are constructed on, with effects differing across beachfront, lakefront, grass and snow-capped land. The player also builds utilities to service their properties, such as power stations to fuel industries, and roads and gas stations to maintain traffic. Players must consider several factors that modify business success, including proximity to undesirable buildings, the preferences of consumers, and seasonal patterns. The game features a yearly calendar, with information about financial performance displayed at the end of the year. The game's single-player mode lasts five calendar years. The game also features a split-screen two-player mode, which lasts until one player wins.

== Reception ==
Electronic Games praised the game as a "quality" title, noting its graphics were "colourful, well-drawn and easy to understand", with "pretty" music, although found the one-player mode to be "little more than a basic economics lesson". Computer Entertainer nominated the game as the 1984 'Program of the Year' for the ColecoVision. Retrospective reception of Fortune Builder has identified the game as an early precursor to the later Maxis simulation series Sim City. Retro Gamer listed the game as one of the "perfect" titles for the system, writing "predating SimCity by a good five years, Fortune Builder is an extremely polished sim", highlighting the game's "staggering range of items" and "insanely polished" two-player mode. Considering the game to have inspired SimCity, Digital Press described the title as "very advanced for its time", although noted that the game "isn't visually appealing and would probably impress only the diehard strategiests because of its lumbering pace".
