= The Dovetail Group =

American video game developer

The Dovetail Group, Inc. was one of the earliest video game developers to specialize in music video games. The Dovetail Group's products were designed for systems such as the Atari 8-bit computers and the Commodore 64. Notable games developed by The Dovetail Group include Halftime Battlin' Bands (1984), Coco-Notes (1984), and Movie Musical Madness (1984). These games represent some of the earliest examples of the music management subgenre of music video games.

== Games ==
=== Halftime Battlin' Bands ===
Published by CBS Software in 1984, Halftime Battlin' Bands is a multiplayer game that requires a player to compose a marching tune and then lead a rank of band members in complex formations to outmaneuver the opponent player (Single-play mode means that the opponent was the computer). In order to prevent the other band from accomplishing their goals, a bench of weapons are available for use against the other band. As the two opposing teams compete, The Jazz Scats (a beatnik jazz band) cheer for the team that is winning. The player is scored based on time it takes to complete a good routine and quality of the routine.

InfoWorld's Essential Guide to Atari Computers recommended the game among educational software for the Atari 8-bit.

=== Coco-Notes ===
In Coco-Notes (also published by CBS Software), the player is stranded on Coco-Note Isle where they must fish for musical notes in the form of coconuts and tunes in the form of fish. The player may then use these notes and tunes to create melodies in a free form manner. The game also features a quiz minigame where The Jazz Scats (a group of castaway hipsters) perform the first half of a jazz song and the player must then complete the song before Mr. Cool Clam (a square note-eating clam) eats the song.

InfoWorld's Essential Guide to Atari Computers recommended the game among educational software for the Atari 8-bit.

=== Movie Musical Madness ===
Movie Musical Madness is a 1-player music management game in which the player takes the role of a musical film director as he attempts to create an appropriate score for, select an appropriate plot for, and direct the actions of his group of actors, The Jazz Scats. The Jazz Scats (a group of bearded actors) can be set to perform in dozens of scenes ranging from city scenes to jungle scenes to outer-space scenes.
