= Donkey Kong Jr. =

1982 video game

- North American arcade flyer
- Developer: Nintendo R&D1 (Note: ColecoVision, Atari 2600, Intellivision, and Adam versions developed by Coleco; Atari 8-bit version developed by Atari, Inc.; Atari 7800 version developed by Atari Corporation.)
- Publishers: Nintendo: ColecoVision, 2600, Intellivision; NA: Coleco; EU: CBS Electronics Adam Coleco Atari 8-bit Atari, Inc. 7800 Atari Corporation
- Director: Shigeru Miyamoto
- Producer: Gunpei Yokoi
- Artists: Shigeru Miyamoto; Yoshio Sakamoto
- Composer: Yukio Kaneoka
- Series: Donkey Kong
- Platform: Arcade: ColecoVision, NES, Atari 2600, Intellivision, Atari 8-bit, Coleco Adam, Famicom Disk System, Atari 7800, Nintendo e-Reader
- Release: August 1982: Arcade; JP/NA: August 1982; EU: Late 1982 ColecoVision; February 1983 NES; JP: July 15, 1983; NA: June 1986; EU: June 15, 1987 2600; September 1983 Intellivision; October 1983 Atari 8-bit; March 1984 Adam; April 1984 Famicom Disk System; JP: July 19, 1988 7800; November 1988 e-Reader; NA: September 16, 2002
- Genre: Platform
- Modes: Single-player, multiplayer

Donkey Kong Jr. (Note: Japanese: ドンキーコングJR., Hepburn: Donkī Kongu Junia) is a 1982 platform game developed and published by Nintendo for arcades. It is the sequel to 1981's Donkey Kong, but with the roles reversed compared to its predecessor: Mario is now the villain and Donkey Kong Jr. is trying to save his kidnapped father. After its initial release in arcades, the game was ported to a variety of home consoles, including the Famicom/Nintendo Entertainment System (for which the game was released as a launch title in Japan). The game's title is written as Donkey Kong Junior in the North American arcade version and various conversions to non-Nintendo systems.

The game was principally designed by Shigeru Miyamoto and his co-worker, Nintendo chief engineer Gunpei Yokoi. Miyamoto also created the graphics for the game along with Yoshio Sakamoto. As with its predecessor, the music for the game was composed by Yukio Kaneoka.

A sequel, Donkey Kong 3, and a spin-off game, Donkey Kong Jr. Math, were released in 1983.

== Gameplay ==
Donkey Kong Jr. trying to rescue his father from the cage next to Mario

Like its predecessor, Donkey Kong Jr. is a platform game. There are a total of four stages, each with a unique theme. DK Jr. can run left and right, jump, and grab vines/chains/ropes to climb higher on the screen. He can slide down vines, or climb faster by holding two. Enemies include "Snapjaws", which resemble bear traps with eyes; bird-like creatures called "Nitpickers", some of which can attack by dropping eggs; and "Sparks" which roam across the wiring in one of Mario's hideouts. DK Jr. can jump over these enemies while on platforms, switch from one vine/chain/rope to another to dodge them, or knock down pieces of fruit that will destroy every enemy they touch before falling off the bottom of the screen.

To pass the first three stages, DK Jr. must reach the key hanging next to his father's cage, whereupon Mario flees while pushing the cage off the screen. In the fourth stage, DK Jr. must push six keys into locks on the topmost platform to free Donkey Kong. After a brief cutscene, the player is taken back to the first stage at an increased difficulty. A bonus timer runs throughout each stage, and any points remaining on it are added to the player's score upon completion.

DK Jr. loses a life when he touches any enemy or projectile, falls too great a distance, falls into water or off the bottom of the screen, or lets the bonus timer reach zero. The game ends when all lives are lost.

Donkey Kong Jr. has a kill screen at level 22.

== Plot ==
Donkey Kong has been defeated by Mario, who has put him in a cage in a forest. Donkey Kong's son, Donkey Kong Jr., follows Mario in an attempt to free his father. Mario transports Donkey Kong to his Hideout via helicopter, before Mario takes the keys to Donkey Kong's chains and places them around the building. Several enemies attack Donkey Kong Jr., but he escapes them and makes it to his father, releasing him from the chains as Mario falls to the ground. Donkey Kong Jr. saves Donkey Kong and the two set off together. Mario pursues the kongs, but flees after Donkey Kong knocks him back.

original Donkey Kong Jr. arcade cabinet

== Development ==
During Donkey Kong's development in 1981, Shigeru Miyamoto's team had come up with several ideas and complete levels that would not fit into the game. They eventually began fleshing out these concepts, and these designs evolved into something all their own. The process was so far along, with even entire stages conceived, that one of the team members suggested they start working on another game. The conversation happened around the same time that Nintendo wanted another Donkey Kong coin-op to capitalize on the original's popularity, giving Miyamoto the opportunity to explore his newly established series. Originally, Miyamoto wanted the new game to star Donkey Kong himself, but there were problems with the character's large size. They came up with the idea to make a smaller Donkey Kong who would be the son of Donkey Kong. Since they still wanted a big Donkey Kong on top of the screen, they came up with the plot of Mario capturing him after the events of the first game.

=== Kill screen ===
Due to the level counter only having one digit, the counter shows numbers 1 to 9 in levels 1 to 9, seven blanks in levels 10 to 16, and the letters A to F in the levels 17–22. The kill screen occurs the same way as in Donkey Kong, where an integer overflow occurs after too big a result is given after a multiplication problem in the computing. The timer counts as if there are 700 points, then kills Donkey Kong Jr. until all lives are gone.

== Ports ==
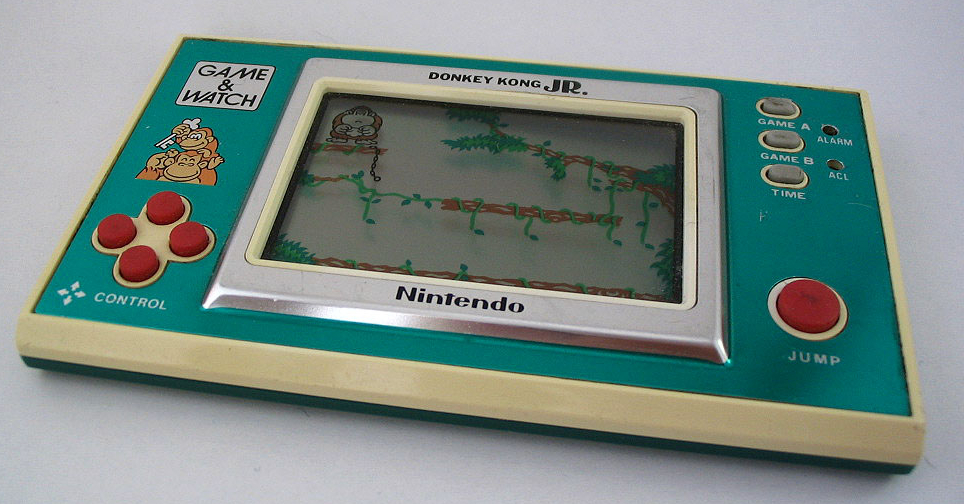
New Wide Screen Game & Watch Donkey Kong Jr.

The order of the levels is different in different territories. In the Japanese version, the four levels appear in 1-2-3-4 sequence and then repeat, just as with the Japanese release of Donkey Kong. In the US version, the order is 1–4. 1–2–4, 1–3–4, 1-2-3-4 and then 1-2-3-4 from then on.

Donkey Kong Jr. was ported to the NES, serving as one of three Japanese launch games on the Famicom. It was also ported to the Family Computer Disk System, which was released only in Japan. Atari released ports for the Atari 2600, Atari 7800, and Atari 8-bit computers, while Coleco released ports for the ColecoVision and Coleco Adam. CBS Electronics released a port for the Intellivision. A BBC Micro conversion was made but unreleased. Three Game & Watch versions of the game were also made. Two black-and-white versions for the New Wide Screen and Multi Screen handheld series (later under the model name Donkey Kong II), and a color version for the Tabletop and Panorama series. In 2002 the NES version was rereleased on the GBA add-on, the e-Reader.

== Reception ==
In Japan, the original arcade version was the eighth highest-grossing arcade game of 1982.

Raymond Dimetrosky of Video Games Player gave the ColecoVision version a positive review. He compared it favorably with another ColecoVision arcade conversion released at the same time, Sega's Space Fury, writing that Donkey Kong Jr. has better graphics and gameplay. Computer Games magazine in 1984 reviewed the Coleco Adam version, calling it a "supergame adaptation" and the best conversion of the game.

Donkey Kong Jr. received an award in the category of "1984 Best Videogame Audio-Visual Effects (16K or more ROM)" at the 5th annual Arkie Awards, where the judges described it as "great fun", and noted that the game was successful as a sequel–"extend[ing] the theme and present[ing] a radically different play-action" than its predecessor, Donkey Kong.

Donkey Kong Jr. is regarded as one of the Top 100 Video Games by the Killer List of Videogames. It was selected to be among five arcade games chosen for history's first official video game world championship, which was filmed at Twin Galaxies in Ottumwa, Iowa by ABC-TV's That's Incredible! over the weekend of January 8–9, 1983.

Allgame gave a review score of 4 out of 5 stars praising the graphics and sound being "exceptionally arcade-like" and the controls and play mechanics being faithful to the arcade version.

== Legacy ==
=== Re-releases ===
The NES version, along with its predecessor, was re-released in 1988 in an NES compilation titled Donkey Kong Classics. This version was later released on the Nintendo e-Reader and is available on the Virtual Console for the Wii. The NES version is also a playable game in Animal Crossing, though a special password is needed from an official website which is now no longer available. Donkey Kong Jr. was made available for the Nintendo 3DS from the Nintendo eShop on Virtual Console, released in Japan on April 18, 2012, in North America on June 14, and in Europe on August 23 and was given away free to the Ambassadors users before the full release. It was again released for the Wii U Virtual Console in 2014. The arcade version of Donkey Kong Jr., featuring both the Japanese and American versions, was released by Hamster Corporation for the Nintendo Switch as part of the company's Arcade Archives series in December 2018. The NES version was released on the Nintendo Classics service on May 15, 2019.

In 2004, Namco released an arcade cabinet containing Donkey Kong, Donkey Kong Jr., and Mario Bros.

=== Competitive play ===
On August 10, 2008, Icarus Hall of Port Angeles, Washington, scored 1,033,000 points playing Donkey Kong Jr.

On April 24, 2009, Steve Wiebe eclipsed Hall's score, finishing with 1,139,800 points. On September 3, at 1984 Arcade in Springfield, Missouri, Mark L. Kiehl of Enid, Oklahoma surpassed Wiebe's record with a score of 1,147,800. Steve Wiebe regained the record with a score of 1,190,400 on his home machine set on Tuesday, February 16, 2010. Mark Kiehl has since eclipsed the previous world record with a score of 1,307,500. In November 2016, Kiehl improved the record with a score of 1,412,200.

On July 3, 2023, Justin Elliott performed a score of 1,584,400 live on his Twitch channel to secure the World Record. The score was independently verified by the Donkey Kong Forum as well as Twin Galaxies.

=== In popular culture ===
The game spawned a cereal with fruit-flavored cereal pieces shaped like bananas and cherries.

The game was featured on numerous episodes of Starcade. Host Geoff Edwards noted that he had the arcade machine in his dressing room and found the game to be highly difficult.

Donkey Kong Jr. was featured in Saturday Supercade (a series that aired on Saturday mornings from 1983 to 1985) with the title character voiced by Frank Welker.

Donkey Kong Jr. is one of the eight playable characters in Super Mario Kart for the SNES. This version was released as a racer in Mario Kart Tour alongside Mario from the same game in 2020. He is also a playable character in Mario's Tennis on Virtual Boy and Mario Tennis on the Nintendo 64.

In the version of Super Mario Bros. 3 seen in Super Mario All-Stars, as well as the Game Boy Advance version, the king of World 4 was transformed into a young gorilla identical to Donkey Kong Jr.

Donkey Kong Jr. is among the characters in Super Mario Maker that players can transform into by use of Mystery Mushrooms.

== See also ==
- List of platformers
- List of video games featuring Mario
- 1982 in video games
