= Movie Musical Madness =

Cover art for The Dovetail Group's 3rd title, Movie Musical Madness.

Movie Musical Madness is a computer program that was published by The Dovetail Group.

== Features ==
Movie Musical Madness is a 1-player music management game in which the player takes the role of a musical film director as he attempts to create an appropriate score for, select an appropriate plot for, and direct the actions of his group of actors, The Jazz Scats. The Jazz Scats (a group of bearded actors) can be set to perform in dozens of scenes ranging from city scenes to jungle scenes to outer-space scenes.

== Reception ==
Joyce Worley from Electronic Games said that "Movie Musical Madness is a merry-madcap sort of program. Designed for kids from about age 6 and over, it will nonetheless charm older computerists just as well as they build sets, pick the music, then guide the stars through their paces. The "movies" may never win Academy Awards, but the fun is in the creating!

Tom Benford from Commodore Microcomputers said that "Movie Musical Madness is my personal choice for an Oscar. And what's more, it's a great program for kids of any age, including moms, dads and grandparents as well. It's wonderful fun that provides plenty of exercise for your creativity and imagination."

Braden E. Griffin M.D. from ANALOG Computing said that "All in all, Movie Musical Madness is fun, stimulating and enjoyable."

InfoWorld's Essential Guide to Atari Computers recommended the game among educational software for the Atari 8-bit.
