= Illusions (video game) =

- Publisher: Coleco
- Platform: ColecoVision
- Release: 1984
- Genre: Puzzle

Illusions (stylized as illusions) is a surreal puzzle video game published by Coleco for its ColecoVision console in 1984. The player maneuvers blobs around the screen, trying to get them to merge or, alternatively, split apart. At times, lizards may chase the blobs around. A water bucket, when spilled, can cause the lizard to turn into a fish. If the fish remains there too long, however, it turns into a bird.

The game was created by Nice Ideas, a division of Mattel that was located midway between Cannes and Nice.
