= The Railroad Works =

1985 video game

- Developer: CBS Software
- Publisher: CBS Software
- Platforms: Apple II, Commodore 64, MS-DOS
- Release: 1985

The Railroad Works is a video game allowing construction and simulation of model railroads. It was published by CBS Software in 1985.

== Gameplay ==
The Railroad Works is a game in which construction for model railroading is simulated.

== Reception ==
Mike Markowitz reviewed the game for Computer Gaming World, and stated that "TRW is not a complete simulation of railroading, or even of model railroading, but it is great fun."
