= Up'n Down =

1983 video game

- Developer: Sega
- Publishers: JP: Sega; NA: Bally Midway
- Platforms: Arcade, Apple II, Atari 2600, Atari 8-bit, ColecoVision, Commodore 64
- Release: Arcade: JP: September 1983; NA: March 1984; 2600: October 1984
- Genre: Maze
- Modes: Single-player, multiplayer

Up'n Down is an arcade video game developed by Sega and released in 1983. It was ported to the Atari 2600, ColecoVision, Atari 8-bit computers, and Commodore 64. In Up'n Down, the player drives a car forward and backward along a branching, vertically scrolling track, collecting flags and jumping on other cars to destroy them.

== Gameplay ==
Arcade original

Up'n Down is a vertically scrolling game which has a pseudo-3D perspective. The player controls a purple dune buggy that resembles a Volkswagen Beetle. The buggy moves forward along a single-lane path; pressing up or down on the joystick causes the buggy to speed up or slow down, pressing right or left causes the buggy to switch lanes at an intersection, and pressing the "Jump" button causes the buggy to jump in the air. Jumping is required to avoid other cars on the road; the player can either jump over them, or land on them for points.

To complete a round, the player must collect 10 colored flags by running over them with the buggy. If the player passes by a flag without picking it up, it will appear again later in the round. The roads feature inclines and descents that affect the buggy's speed, and bridges which must be jumped. A player loses a turn whenever the buggy either collides with another vehicle, or jumps off the road into the grass or water.

== Ports ==
Atari 2600 port

Sega released a port for the Atari 2600 in 1984 with jarring background music. According to Game Sound: An Introduction to the History, Theory, and Practice of Video Game Music and Sound Design by Karen Collins, the arcade version's "bluesy F-sharp minor groove" was transformed into "a very unsettling version based in C minor with a flattened melodic second" because of limitations of the 2600 sound hardware.

== Reception ==
In Japan, Game Machine listed Up'n Down as the second most successful new table arcade unit of October 1983.

== See also ==
- Bump 'n' Jump
