= Gust Buster =

- Developer: Sunrise Software
- Publisher: Sunrise Software
- Designer: Ed Salvo
- Platforms: ColecoVision, Commodore 64
- Release: 1983: ColecoVision; 1984: C64
- Genre: Action
- Mode: Single-player

Gust Buster is a video game written by Ed Salvo for the ColecoVision console and published by Sunrise Software in 1983. A Commodore 64 port followed in 1984. Salvo previously developed several Atari 2600 releases for Games by Apollo.

== Gameplay ==
In Gust Buster, the player must navigate through the skies of an amusement park by inflating or deflating balloons. Movement is achieved by catching currents that go in different directions depending on height. This game is one of the only ColecoVision titles not to use the joystick.

One gains points by landing in crowded areas and selling balloons, and one can restock his balloon supply by landing on a popcorn truck. The player must be careful not to overinflate the balloons or they will bust, in which case they must be replaced by drawing some from his pocket.
