= Victory (video game) =

1982 video game

- Arcade flyer
- Publisher: Exidy
- Designer: Howell Ivy
- Platforms: Arcade, ColecoVision
- Release: February 1982: Arcade; February 1982 ColecoVision; October 1983
- Genre: Multidirectional shooter
- Modes: Single-player, multiplayer

Victory is a 1982 arcade video game by Exidy. It was later ported to the ColecoVision. Victory was the only contemporary game on the ColecoVision along with Omega Race to natively support the Roller Controller, a trackball controller. To renew interest in the game, Exidy released a conversion kit for the arcade version that turned the game into Victory Banana, a new space game with identical gameplay and a modified, more humorous theme behind the graphics.

== Gameplay ==
Victory is a multidirectional shooter game where the player controls a spaceship called Battlestar. The ship's direction is controlled by a paddle. The longer the thrust button is held, the faster the ship goes. The player must pilot the BattleStar spaceship and fight a variety of enemy ships in space and on the planet. This game also features Speech synthesis which is played during gameplay, and when inserting a coin.

== Release and reception ==
ColecoVision Reception

Review scores
Publication	Score
Allgame	2.5/5
Videogaming and Computer Gaming Illustrated	A, A−

The arcade version of Victory was released in February 1982. A port was released for the ColecoVision video game console in October 1983.

Reviewing the ColecoVision port, one of the reviewers from Videogaming and Computer Gaming Illustrated gave the game a rating of A and said: "The best attributes of Odyssey's UFO and the arcade Defender make this a definitive cartridge." Another reviewer gave a rating of A− and wrote: "Victory and the roller controller are indeed impressive." Telematch said the game is not a masterpiece of programming but called it still an enjoyable game. The end music was noted as worth listening to multiple times. In a retrospective review, AllGame described it as a strange hybrid of Time Pilot and Defender.

== See also ==
- 1982 in video games
- Golden age of arcade video games
