= WarGames (video game) =

1984 video game

Wargames
- Flyer for the ColecoVision version
- Developer: Coleco
- Publisher: Coleco
- Platforms: Colecovision, Atari 8-bit, Commodore 64
- Release: May 1984
- Genre: Strategy

WarGames is a strategy video game developed by Coleco for the ColecoVision and published in 1984. It was ported to the Atari 8-bit computers and Commodore 64. The game's goal is to defend the United States against nuclear attack, much in the style of a less frantic Missile Command. The principal designer was Coleco staffer Joseph Angiolillo.

Joseph Angiolillo presented a one-hour seminar on the creation of WarGames at the August 2011 Board Game Players Convention in Lancaster, PA where he showed a DVD of his creation process and memos and lists from Coleco showing the designers of each Coleco product.

The game was directly inspired by MGM's 1983 film WarGames, but instead of depicting the film's events, it adapts its iconic NORAD scene into playable form.

== Gameplay ==
The initial DEFCON for each sector is 5.

As the game begins, the iconic line "Greetings Professor Falken:" appears on the screen, quickly followed by, in a box: "Select a Challenge Level from 1 to 8 for Global Thermonuclear War". After the skill level has been chosen, the main game screen appears.

The continental United States is divided into six sectors, each with its own bases and major cities. ICBMs and bombers rain over the North Pole, while submarines inch toward coasts. Defenses consist of ABMs, interceptor aircraft, submarines and an experimental particle beam satellite that trumps everything else but weaves in and out of sectors on a fixed orbit. US units are individually far superior, but vulnerable to the destruction of interceptor and missile bases. Events proceed in real time in all sectors as defenses gradually crumble.

Enemy presence and the destruction of bases and cities lower a sector's Defense Condition (DEFCON) status. The DEFCON level for each sector is factored into the total DEFCON status. If it stays at 1 for 60 successive seconds, or if at any time all cities and bases have been destroyed, an automated counterstrike triggers global thermonuclear war and the player loses the game. The game is won by preventing a counterstrike long enough for a cease-fire to be reached. With eight difficulty levels, one game takes approximately four to eight minutes.

The game is visually stark and technical by 1984 standards. As in the original movie, the manual hints that the attack is a hallucinated result of a computer glitch; the counterstrike is not.

== See also ==
- DEFCON
- WarGames: Defcon 1
