= Dr. Seuss' Fix-Up the Mix-Up Puzzler =

1984 video game

- Developer: Coleco
- Publisher: Coleco
- Platforms: ColecoVision, Atari 8-bit, Commodore 64, Apple II
- Release: NA: 1984
- Genre: Puzzle
- Mode: Single-player

Dr. Seuss' Fix-Up the Mix-Up Puzzler is a sliding puzzle video game developed by Coleco. It was first released for the ColecoVision in 1984 and was later ported to several home computers including Apple, Atari, and Commodore. The game features six Dr. Seuss characters: the Cat in the Hat, the Grinch, a Star-Bellied Sneetch, the Doorman, and the Woset and Clark. Designed for children ages 4–10, the objective of the game is to reassemble scrambled pictures, each of which is composed of three characters.

== Gameplay ==
There are five difficulty levels from which to choose. In the easiest level, players can mix and match the characters' heads, torsos and feet any way they like. In higher levels of play, there are more puzzle pieces, some of which are upside down, and characters must be assembled in their original left-to-right order. Puzzles range in size from 9 to 25 pieces. The fifth level has a time limit which, when beaten, will give the player bonus points.

The manual for Dr. Seuss' Fix-Up the Mix-Up Puzzler claims that the game promotes "problem-solving strategies, logic, pattern recognition, memory and a variety of other early learning skills."
