= Carnival (video game) =

1980 video game

- North American arcade flyer
- Developer: Gremlin Industries
- Publishers: Arcade: NA: Sega/Gremlin; JP: Sega; Atari 8-bit ANALOG Software; 2600, ColecoVision, Intellivision; Coleco
- Designer: Lane Hauck
- Programmers: 2600; Jessica Stevens (credited as Steve Kitchen); Atari 8-bit Phil Mork
- Platforms: Arcade, Atari 8-bit, Atari 2600, ColecoVision, Intellivision
- Release: Arcade: JP: June 1980; NA: August 1980; Atari 8-bit: 1981; ColecoVision, Intellivision: October 1982; 2600: November 1982
- Genre: Fixed shooter
- Modes: Single-player, multiplayer
- Arcade system: Dual

Carnival is a 1980 fixed shooter video game developed by Gremlin Industries and released by Sega for arcades. It was one of the first video games with a bonus round.

A version of Carnival was released for Atari 8-bit computers in 1981 by ANALOG Software, the commercial software label of ANALOG Computing magazine. Conversions for the Atari 2600, ColecoVision, and Intellivision were published in 1982 by Coleco.

== Gameplay ==
A duck flying toward the player's pistol (arcade)

The goal of the game is to shoot at targets while conserving a limited ammunition supply for as long as possible. There are buttons for firing and left/right movement. The cocktail version replaces the directional buttons with a two-way joystick.

Three rows of targets scroll across the screen in alternating directions; these include rabbits, ducks, owls, and extra-bullet targets, with higher rows awarding more points. If a duck reaches the bottom row without being shot, it will come to life and begin flying down toward the player. Any ducks that reach the bottom of the screen in this manner will eat some of the player's bullets. New ducks are added to the top row at intervals. A large pop-up target above the top row can either award or subtract bullets or points when hit. A spinning wheel with eight pipes also sits above the top row; the point value of the pipes decreases for every shot that does not hit one of them. In addition, a bonus counter increases by the value of every target shot in the three rows, and can be collected by shooting the letters of the word "BONUS" in order as they cycle through the rows. The bonus stops increasing as soon as any letter is shot.

A round ends when all targets and pipes have been shot. The player receives bonus points for all unused bullets, then plays a bonus round in which a large bear with a target walks across the screen. Each time the bear is shot, it rears up for a second, then begins walking more quickly in the other direction. The object is to shoot the bear as many times as possible until it escapes off the screen, using unlimited ammunition. Following the bonus round, the next wave begins. Each subsequent bonus round adds a bear to the screen, to a maximum of four.

Higher levels feature increased target point values, more ducks, fewer extra-bullet targets, faster-moving targets, and an increased rate at which new ducks appear. The game ends when the player's ammunition supply is exhausted through firing and/or being eaten by ducks.

== Development ==
Carnival is one of the few games that has two different PCBs, one for each version. Normally a game only has one PCB with a DIP switch that sets it to either upright or cocktail mode. The upright and cocktail cabinets each come in two varieties, one woodgrain and the other painted orange and white.

The tune that plays throughout the game is "Sobre las Olas" (Over the Waves) by Juventino Rosas, a tune commonly associated with carnivals and funfairs. The game's General Instrument AY-3-8910 chip allows for a relatively complex rendition of Rosas's waltz with overlaid sound effects.

ANALOG Software published a clone for Atari 8-bit computers called Shooting Gallery in 1981. They later obtained an official license from Sega Enterprises and re-released it as Carnival.

== Reception ==
Electronic Games called the ColecoVision port of Carnival "a letter-perfect recreation of the arcade original that's not to be missed."

In a retrospective discussion of the arcade game's music, video game scholar Andrew wrote, "as the track makes use of all three tone-channels—using two for the waltz's characteristic oom-pah-pah and one for its memorable melody—the resulting texture is rich enough to do the music justice. And the inclusion of numerous sound effects, including three different duck quacks and a bear's roar, makes for a veritable sonic feast."

== Legacy ==
Sega officially licensed the console rights to Carnival to Coleco, who ported it to the Atari VCS, Intellivision, and Colecovision platforms.

Acornsoft published a clone, initially called Carnival, for the BBC Micro in 1983 which was later renamed to Carousel.
