= Smurf: Rescue in Gargamel's Castle =

1982 video game

- Atari 2600 box art
- Developer: Coleco
- Publisher: Coleco
- Platforms: Atari 2600, ColecoVision
- Release: ColecoVision: NA: September 1982; 2600: NA: April 1983
- Genre: Platform
- Mode: Single-player

Smurf: Rescue in Gargamel's Castle is a 1982 platform game developed and published by Coleco for the ColecoVision and Atari 2600. The game is based on the television series The Smurfs. In the game, the player must brave a series of obstacles to rescue Smurfette from Gargamel's castle.

== Gameplay ==
Even stumbling over a few weeds can be fatal.

Gargamel has kidnapped Smurfette. As a Smurf, the player has to walk from the Smurf village through a forest and a cave on the way to Gargamel's castle, where Smurfette awaits rescue. The player has an energy bar that slowly depletes over time.

Each side-scrolling screen presents various obstacles that the player must precisely jump over (e.g. fences, stalagmites) or land upon (e.g. ledges). Failure to execute any jump results in instant death. Higher difficulty levels introduce crows, flying bats, and spiders that the player must also avoid.

The ColecoVision version of Smurf: Rescue in Gargamel's Castle contains Easter eggs: initials may appear onscreen when moving between screens, and the player will receive hundreds of thousands of points when moving between two forest screens.

Two of the background music tracks are "Simple Gifts" and the first movement of Ludwig van Beethoven's 6th Symphony, the "Pastoral".

== Reception ==
Creative Computing Video & Arcade Games said in 1983 that Smurf for ColecoVision was "truly good fun", approving of its graphics. The magazine stated that the game was suitable for very young children and older ones, reporting that neighborhood kids "loved it. I almost had to evict them from my house at night so I could get a game in before going to sleep". The ColecoVision version was reviewed in Video magazine in its "Arcade Alley" column where it was praised as utilizing "the best audiovisuals in the entire [ColecoVision] line". The visuals were described as "what amounts to the video-game equivalent of a Saturday-morning cartoon show", and the audio was described as "sophisticated" with nuanced sounds such as ominous organ music and the "muted echo" accompaniment to standard leaps. The reviewers also cautioned players to "prepare for frustration" until they learned how to accurately judge leaps.

Computer Entertainer gave the ColecoVision version of the game a perfect four stars in both gameplay and graphics and described it as "a must" for Smurfs fans. They would describe the Atari 2600 version as "somewhat less elegant" than the ColecoVision version but still an excellent conversion. Computer Entertainer complemented the game's graphics, especially the smurf player character, which they would describe as "nearly as well animated as the cartoons from which he is drawn". Though they do acknowledge the game would probably be unappealing to teenagers or adults.

The game was given the award for "Best Video Game Audiovisual Effects" at the 4th annual Arkie Awards.
