= Mountain King (video game) =

1983 video game

- Developer: K-Byte: Atari 2600 Video Software Specialists
- Publisher: CBS Electronics: Atari 8-bit, 2600, 5200 CBS Electronics ColecoVision Sunrise Software Commodore 64, VIC-20 Beyond Software
- Designers: E. F. Dreyer; Robert Matson
- Programmer: Robert Matson: Atari 8-bit, 5200 Robert Matson Atari 2600 Ed Salvo Commodore 64 Douglas Dragin
- Platforms: Atari 8-bit, Atari 2600, Atari 5200, ColecoVision, Coleco Adam, Commodore 64, VIC-20
- Release: June 1983: Atari 8-bit June 1983 Atari 5200 October 1983 Atari 2600 December 1983 Coleco Adam September 1984 ColecoVision October 1984
- Genre: Platform

Mountain King is a multidirectional scrolling platform game published by CBS Electronics in 1983. It was designed by E. F. Dreyer and Robert Matson, and programmed by Matson, for the Atari 8-bit computers. It was converted to the Atari 2600, Atari 5200, ColecoVision, Commodore 64, and VIC-20. Along with Tunnel Runner and Omega Race, the Atari 2600 cartridge includes 256 bytes of random access memory, a feature promoted as "RAM Plus".

== Gameplay ==
The player jumping in the mines

The player takes the role of an explorer searching a diamond mine and the temple of an ancient civilization. The object of the game is to discover and collect the Golden Crown and take it to the peak of the mountain.

The mountain environment is made up of platforms and ladders, with the Perpetual Flame located on the top of the summit. This is where the Golden Crown must be taken. To retrieve the Crown, the player must first collect one thousand points. Diamonds are worth 25 points each and treasure chests are worth 260 points. Diamonds are scattered throughout the level, and treasure chests can be located by using the explorer's flashlight to see in the darkness. While it is not necessary for the player to descend to the very bottom of the mountain, there are many treasure chests to find there, but these resources are not without peril: a giant spider lurks in the lowest level, and will give chase if the player spends more than a few seconds exploring the bottom. Once the player has the required score, they must locate the Flame Spirit by following the musical cues. The Flame Spirit is the key to the Temple Chamber, where the Crown is kept. If the player attempts to enter the Temple before they have the Flame Spirit, the Skull Spirit guarding the entrance will stop him. When the Temple Chamber is unlocked, the player can collect the Crown and take it to the Perpetual Flame - however, there will now be Cave Bats stalking the player. If they touch the crown, they will steal it, and the player will have to start collecting points again.

There are three ways to lose the game. The first and most probable conclusion to the game is the expiration of the timer. When time reaches zero, the game is over. The second, more unfortunate fate involves the giant spider. If the spider catches the player on the lowest level, the player is trapped in a web cocoon. The player can escape from this web by rapidly moving the joystick left and right. If the player does not escape by the time the spider returns, the game will end, ostensibly with the player having been eaten by the spider. The third, when the player touches any regular fires, they shall die and the game will end.

=== Hidden level ===
Mountain King has a hidden level which can be reached by jumping from the tip of a ledge located on the mountain peak at the top of the game screen. Timed correctly, the player will catch the very bottom rung of a higher ladder. The ladder leads into a hidden level of ladders and platforms. At the very top of this area are two strange ghost-like figures, but there is no reward or bonus for entering this level, and the level is extremely difficult to navigate (with falling from the various ladders a common occurrence).

== Soundtrack ==
The game prominently features Edvard Grieg's 1875 composition, In the Hall of the Mountain King from Peer Gynt, after collecting the Golden Crown.

== Reception ==
Softline stated that Mountain King is "a game worth playing" which "is also something more [than a game], something like a fantasy or adventure". Antic praised Mountain King for its gameplay and intelligent use of music and sound.
