= Cabbage Patch Kids: Adventures in the Park =

1984 video game

- Developer(s): Konami Corporation
- Publisher(s): Coleco Industries, Inc.
- Series: Cabbage Patch Kids Adventures
- Platform(s): ColecoVision
- Release: 1984
- Genre(s): Action

Cabbage Patch Kids: Adventures in the Park is a 1984 action/platform game based on the Cabbage Patch Kids franchise. It is the first and only game in the Cabbage Patch Kids Adventures series.

== Gameplay ==
MobyGames described the gameplay thus: "Your player is a Cabbage Patch kid with pigtails who is having a day at the park. A day that includes jumping onto vines and leaping over holes and bouncing onto correct platforms. A misplaced jump will lose a life and additionally there are a few creatures such as bees who end the player's turn when touched. There are several screens of challenge with different combinations of obstacles."

AtariProtos wrote "According to the ColecoVision version's manual, Anna Lee has decided to go out for some exercise in the local park and is soon caught up in a wild adventure (hence the subtitle Adventures in the Park). The game is separated into several different screens (referred to in the game as scenes), each with a different obstacle for your kid to overcome. Obstacles include bouncing balls, water filled pits, floating platforms, bees, and even fires. Each level consists of ten scenes which must all be overcome before the time limit runs out. Along the way Anna may also collect various objects hidden in the trees (using well placed trampolines) for points, but these objects are not necessary to win".

== History ==
In the wake of the video game crash of 1983, this game served as "Coleco's attempt to use one of their properties on the way up (Cabbage Patch Kids) to give a boost-through-association to one of their properties on the way down (the ColecoVision)". An unreleased Atari 2600 version was developed by Individeo. It "has now seen the light of day, thanks to a discovery by Alex Handy at a flea market in California" in 2008. The game was known to exist for some time thanks to an interview conducted with a former Coleco programmer, Ed English, many years prior.

== Ports ==
A re-skinned version of the game named Kiddy Park that did not use the Cabbage Patch Kids license was released in the mid-1980s for the short-lived NABU personal computer, which was a Z80-based network personal computer. Due to the NABU personal computer's proprietary network requirements, during its lifetime it was available only in the Ottawa, Canada market.

== Reception ==
AtariAge wrote of the Atari 2600 version: "As luck would have it, Cabbage Patch Kids: Adventures in the Park is an impressive game, comparable in quality to many modern homebrew games". AtariProtos said "While it may not be able to compare graphically to the Colecovision version, the Atari 2600 version of CPK is an amazing feat of programming. Not only was all the gameplay retained in this conversion, but it even included a cute little background tune which was a rarity in 2600 games. It appears that CPK was simply a victim of the collapsing game market, and by the time the final version was ready in September 1984, Coleco had stopped its 2600 operations."
