= Venture (video game) =

1981 video game

- Arcade flyer
- Developers: Exidy; CommaVid (2600)
- Publishers: Exidy; Coleco (ports)
- Platforms: Arcade, Atari 2600, ColecoVision, Intellivision
- Release: Arcade; August 1981; ColecoVision, 2600; 1982; Intellivision; 1983
- Genre: Action
- Mode: Single-player

Venture is a 1981 action video game developed and published by Exidy for arcades. As a round smiley-face named Winky, the goal is to collect the treasure in each of the rooms. Winky can shoot arrows at enemies which turn into slowly disintegrating corpses when hit. Corpses are deadly to the touch. Each room has a different layout, treasure, and enemies, and some rooms have special features, such as moving walls.

A port was released as a launch title for the ColecoVision in 1982, followed by versions for the Atari 2600 and Intellivision.

== Gameplay ==
Winky (lower right) has entered a room with three monsters and a treasure.

Winky is equipped with a bow and arrow and explores a dungeon with rooms and hallways. Each hallway consists of a playable, overhead map view. Upon entering one of the rooms shown on the map, the game zooms in until the room fills the screen. The hallways are patrolled by large, tentacled monsters named Hallmonsters, which cannot be killed, injured, or stopped in any way. Once in a room, Winky may kill monsters, avoid traps and gather treasures. If he stays in any room too long, a Hallmonster will enter the room, chase and kill him. In this way, the Hallmonsters serve the same role as "Evil Otto" in the arcade game Berzerk. The more quickly the player finishes each level, the higher their score.

The goal of each room is only to steal the room's treasure. In most rooms, it is possible (though difficult) to steal the treasure without defeating the monsters within. Some rooms have traps that are only sprung when the player picks up the treasure. For instance, in "The Two-Headed Room", two two-headed ettins appear the moment the player picks up the prize.

Winky dies if he touches a monster or Hallmonster. Dead monsters decay over time and their corpses may block room exits, delaying Winky and possibly allowing the Hallmonster to enter. Shooting a corpse causes it to regress to its initial death phase. The monsters themselves move in specific patterns but may deviate to chase the player, and the game's AI allows them to dodge the player's shots with varying degrees of "intelligence" (for example, the snakes of "The Serpent Room" are relatively slow to dodge arrows, the trolls of "The Troll Room" are quite adept at evasion).

The game consists of three different dungeon levels with different rooms. After clearing all the rooms in a level, the player advances to the next. After three levels the room pattern and monsters repeat, but at a higher speed and with a different set of treasures.

The different dungeons in each level are:

1. Wall Room, Serpent Room, Skeleton Room, Goblin Room
2. Two-Headed Room, Dragon Room, Spider Room, Troll Room
3. Genie Room, Demon Room, Cyclops Room, Bat Room

== Reception ==
The ColecoVision version of Venture was reviewed in Video magazine in its "Arcade Alley" column where its graphics and background music were praised. Reviewers predicted that the game's "complex play routine and strategies" which had made the game seem "out of place" in the arcade would guarantee the home release's popularity.

In June 1983, Electronic Games ranked the ColecoVision version of Venture as the #9 “Most Popular Videogame Cartridge” in its monthly reader poll. It would go on to receive a Certificate of Merit in the category of "Best Arcade-to-Home Video Game Translation" at the 4th annual Arkie Awards. Creative Computing Video & Arcade Games in 1983 complained of the repetition of the first three levels after completing them, but said that otherwise "ColecoVision Venture is just as enjoyable as the arcade version".

Jan Yarnot reviewed the ColecoVision version of Venture in The Space Gamer No. 58. Besides giving a praise to the game, Yarnot felt that credit should have been given to the designer of that game.

== High score ==
The highest score on the original game was set in 1982 by 15-year-old Randy Kuntz of Fairview, Alberta, Canada.

== See also ==
- Route-16
