= Omega Race =

1981 video game

- ColecoVision box art
- Developer: Midway Manufacturing
- Publishers: Midway Manufacturing; C64, VIC-20; Commodore; ColecoVision, 2600; CBS Electronics
- Designer: Ron Haliburton
- Platforms: Arcade, Commodore 64, VIC-20, ColecoVision, Atari 2600
- Release: August 1981: Arcade; NA: August 1981 C64, VIC-20; 1982 ColecoVision; October 1983 2600; December 1983
- Genre: Shoot 'em up
- Mode: Single-player

Omega Race is a 1981 shoot 'em up video game developed and published by Midway Manufacturing for arcades. It is Midway's only arcade game to utilize vector graphics.

Omega Race was ported to the Commodore 64 and VIC-20 and published by Commodore in 1982, followed by the ColecoVision and Atari 2600 by CBS Electronics in 1983. This game and Victory are the only two games on the ColecoVision to natively support the Roller Controller, a trackball controller.

== Gameplay ==
Omega Race gameplay

Set in the year 2003, the player controls an Omegan Fighter spaceship to destroy enemy droid ships in a rectangular "track". The player's ship is controlled with a spinner to rotate the ship, a button for thrusting, and a button for firing lasers. The enemies that the player must destroy or avoid are drone ships, commander ships, two types of space mines, and shooting star ships. The ship bounces off an invisible barrier on the edges of the screen that briefly appears when hit. By default, extra ships are awarded at 40,000 and 100,000 points.

== Ports ==
The Atari 2600 cartridge came bundled with a "booster grip" controller which converted the single-button Atari CX40 joystick to having separate buttons for thrust and shoot. Omega Race is one of a few CBS games for the Atari 2600 with an additional 256 bytes of RAM in each cartridge, a feature promoted by CBS as "RAM Plus."

== Reception ==
Consumer Guide's How to Win at Video Games stated in 1982 of Omega Race that "any unskilled player can pop a quarter into the machine and stay up there for up to 20,000 points." According to the book, more than 35,000 machines were created, with the average machine taking in $181.00 per week at the time of the book's publication. Frequently, it was one of the top ten money-making arcade machines in any given week in that time period. Michael Blanchet's 1982 book How to Beat the Video Games praised it as having a "deceiving appearance", saying that despite appearing easy it "develops a healthy level of frustration, which you'll find quite stimulating".

Compute! called Omega Race "a real winner for the VIC". BYTE stated that the VIC-20 version "is fast paced, has colorful graphics, and features good sound effects ... Omega Race is a fun game that retains all the best characteristics of the arcade version". Ahoy! called the VIC-20 version "fairly faithful to the arcade game, and very exciting". The VIC-20 version of Omega Race was awarded a Certificate of Merit in the category of "Best Solitaire Computer Game" at the 4th annual Arkie Awards.

== Legacy ==
Omega Race was cloned for the TRS-80 Color Computer as Space Race in 1982.

An update of the game for the Atari Jaguar was pitched to Atari Corporation by Temporary Sanity Designs, but never moved forward beyond the proposal phase; the document is in the hands of community member joekorali of AtariAge.
