= Commodore Power/Play =

US computer magazine

- February/March 1986 issue
- Frequency: Bi-monthly
- Publisher: Commodore Business Machines
- Founded: 1982
- Final issue Number: October/November 1986; Volume 5, Number 5 (Issue 23)
- Country: United States
- Based in: West Chester, Pennsylvania
- Language: English

Commodore Power/Play was one of a pair of computer magazines published by Commodore Business Machines in the United States in support of their 8-bit home computer lines of the 1980s. The other was called Commodore Interface, changed to just Commodore in 1981, Commodore Microcomputer in 1983, and finally to Commodore Microcomputers in 1984 and for the rest of its run. The two magazines were published on an alternating, bimonthly schedule.

== History and profile ==
Power/Play was started in 1982 as a quarterly publication. The magazine was targeted at the home computer user, emphasizing video games, educational and hobbyist uses of the Commodore 64/128 and VIC-20 models. Commodore Microcomputers initially served Commodore's business customers using the PET and CBM lines but as the business market segments standardized on CP/M and later MS-DOS, the coverage of the two magazines essentially overlapped, until the November 1986 issue, when both magazines were switched from a bi-monthly to a monthly schedule and retitled Commodore Magazine.
