= Ahoy! =

American computer magazine published from 1984 to 1989

- № 26, February 1986
- Frequency: Monthly
- Publisher: Ion International
- First issue: January 1984
- Final issue: January 1989
- Country: United States
- Based in: New York City
- ISSN: 8750-4383
- OCLC: 11395055

Ahoy! was a computer magazine published between January 1984 and January 1989 in the United States, covering all Commodore color computers, primarily Commodore 64 and Amiga.

== History ==
The first issue of Ahoy! was published in January 1984. The magazine was published monthly by Ion International and was headquartered in New York City. It published many games in BASIC and machine language, occasionally also printing assembly language source code. Ahoy! published a checksum program called Flankspeed for entering machine language listings.

Ahoy!'s AmigaUser was a related but separate publication dedicated to the Amiga. It was spun off from a series of columns in Ahoy! with the same title, and the first two issues were published instead of the parent magazine in May and August 1988.
