= ColecoVision =

Second-generation home video game console

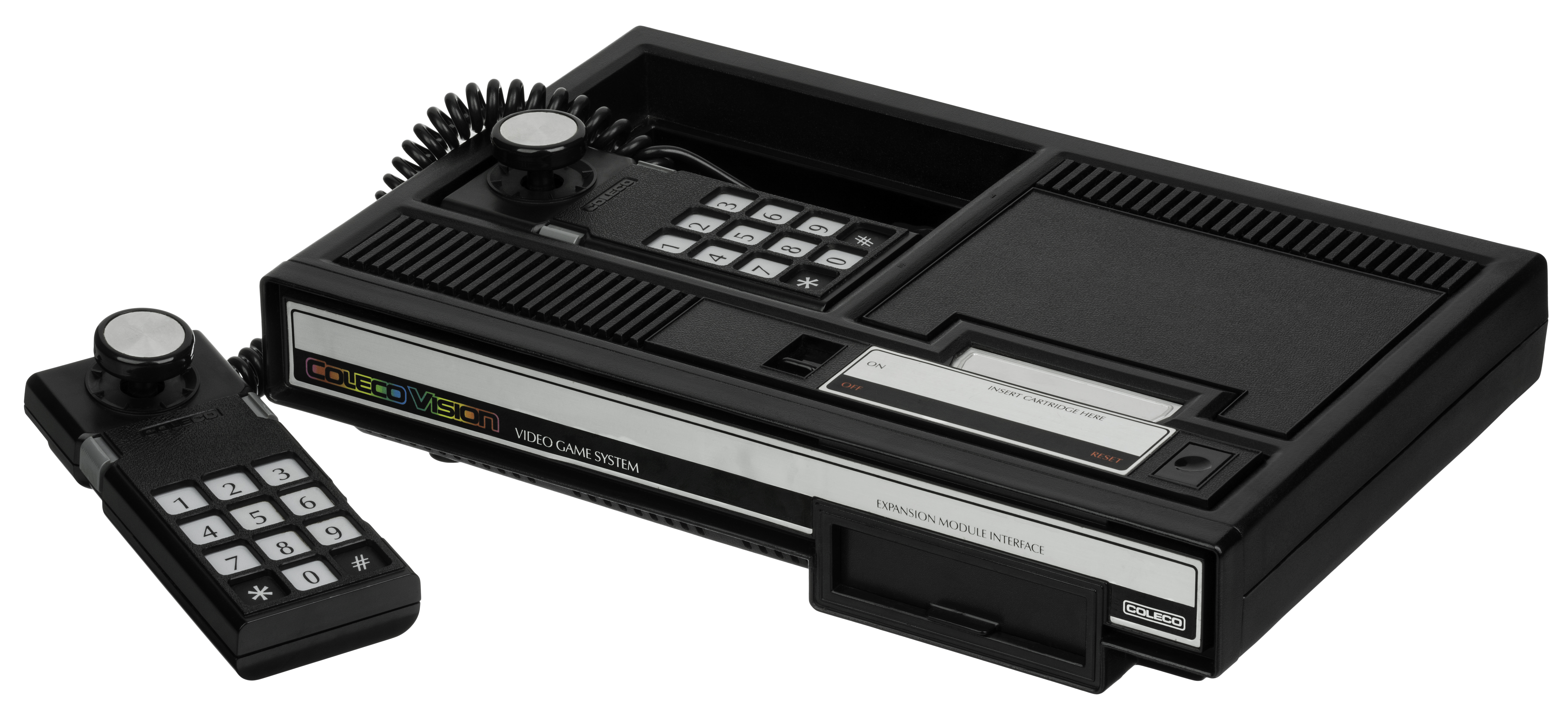
- Manufacturer: Coleco
- Type: Home video game console
- Generation: Second
- Released: NA: August 1982; 44 years ago; EU: July 1983; 43 years ago
- Discontinued: August 1985; 41 years ago
- Units sold: > 2 million (1982–83)
- Media: ROM cartridge
- CPU: Zilog Z80A @ 3.58 MHz
- Memory: 1 KB scratchpad RAM; 16 KB video RAM; 8 KB ROM
- Storage: 8/16/24/32 KB
- Graphics: TMS9928A (NTSC); TMS9929A (PAL)
- Sound: SN76489
- Controller input: Joystick + numeric keypad; Roller Controller; Driving Controller; Super Action Controller
- Best-selling game: Donkey Kong (pack-in)
- Predecessor: Coleco Telstar series (1978)

The ColecoVision is a second-generation home video game console developed by Coleco and launched in North America in August 1982. It was released later in July 1983 in Europe by CBS Electronics as the CBS ColecoVision.

The console offered a closer experience to more powerful arcade video games compared to competitors such as the Atari 2600 and Intellivision. The initial catalog of 12 games on ROM cartridge included the first home version of Nintendo's Donkey Kong as the pack-in game. Approximately 136 games were published for the ColecoVision between 1982 and 1984, including Sega's Zaxxon and some ports of lesser-known arcade games that found a larger audience on the console, such as Lady Bug, Cosmic Avenger, and Venture.

Coleco released a series of hardware add-ons and special controllers to expand the capabilities of the console. "Expansion Module #1" allowed the system to play Atari 2600 cartridges. "Expansion Module #3", released some time later, converted the system into the Adam home computer, using the ColecoVision hardware primarily as a display system and handling joysticks. The resulting system ran all ColecoVision games as well as new software for the Adam.

The ColecoVision was discontinued in 1985, when Coleco withdrew from the video game market. Coleco had already contemplated shifting focus to their successful Cabbage Patch Kids toy line after the costly failure of their Adam computer.

== Development ==
Coleco entered the video game market in 1976 during the dedicated-game home console period with their line of Telstar consoles. When that market became oversaturated over the next few years, the company nearly went bankrupt, but found a successful product through handheld electronic games, with products that beat out those of the current market leader, Mattel. The company also developed a line of miniaturized tabletop arcade video games with licensed rights from arcade game makers including Sega, Bally, Midway, and Nintendo. Coleco was able to survive on sales of their electronic games through to 1982, but that market itself began to wane, and Coleco president Arnold Greenberg was still interested in producing a home video game console.

According to Eric Bromley, who led the engineering for the ColecoVision, Greenberg had wanted to get into the programmable home console market with arcade-quality games, but the cost of components had been a limiting factor. As early as 1979, Bromley had drawn out specifications for a system using a Texas Instruments video and a General Instrument audio chip, but could not get the go-ahead due to the cost of RAM. Around 1981, Bromley saw an article in The Wall Street Journal that asserted the price of RAM had fallen and, after working the cost numbers, Bromley found the system cost fell within their cost margins. Within ten minutes of reporting this to Greenberg, they had established the working name "ColecoVision" for the console as they began a more thorough design—a name which the marketing department never was able to surpass.

Coleco recognized that licensed conversion of arcade games had worked for Atari in selling the Atari VCS, so they had approached Nintendo around 1981 for potential access to their arcade titles. Bromley described a tense set of meetings with Nintendo's president Hiroshi Yamauchi under typical Japanese customs where he sought to negotiate for game rights, though Yamauchi only offered seemingly obscure titles. After a meal with Yamauchi during one day, Bromley excused himself to the restroom and happened upon one of the first Donkey Kong cabinets, which had yet to be released to Western countries. Knowing this game would likely be a hit, Bromley arranged a meeting the following day with Yamauchi and requested the exclusive rights to Donkey Kong; Yamauchi offered them if only they could provide $200,000 upfront by that day and gave them $2 per unit sold. Greenberg agreed, though as in Japanese custom, Bromley did not have a formal contract from Nintendo on his return. By the time of that year's Consumer Electronics Show, which Yamauchi was attending, Bromley found out from Yamauchi's daughter and translator that he had apparently given the rights to Atari. With Yamauchi's daughter's help, Bromley was able to commit Yamauchi to sign a formal contract to affirm the rights to Coleco. Coleco's announcement that they would bundle Donkey Kong with the console was initially met with surprise and skepticism, with journalists and retailers questioning why they would give away their most anticipated home video game with the console.

== Release ==
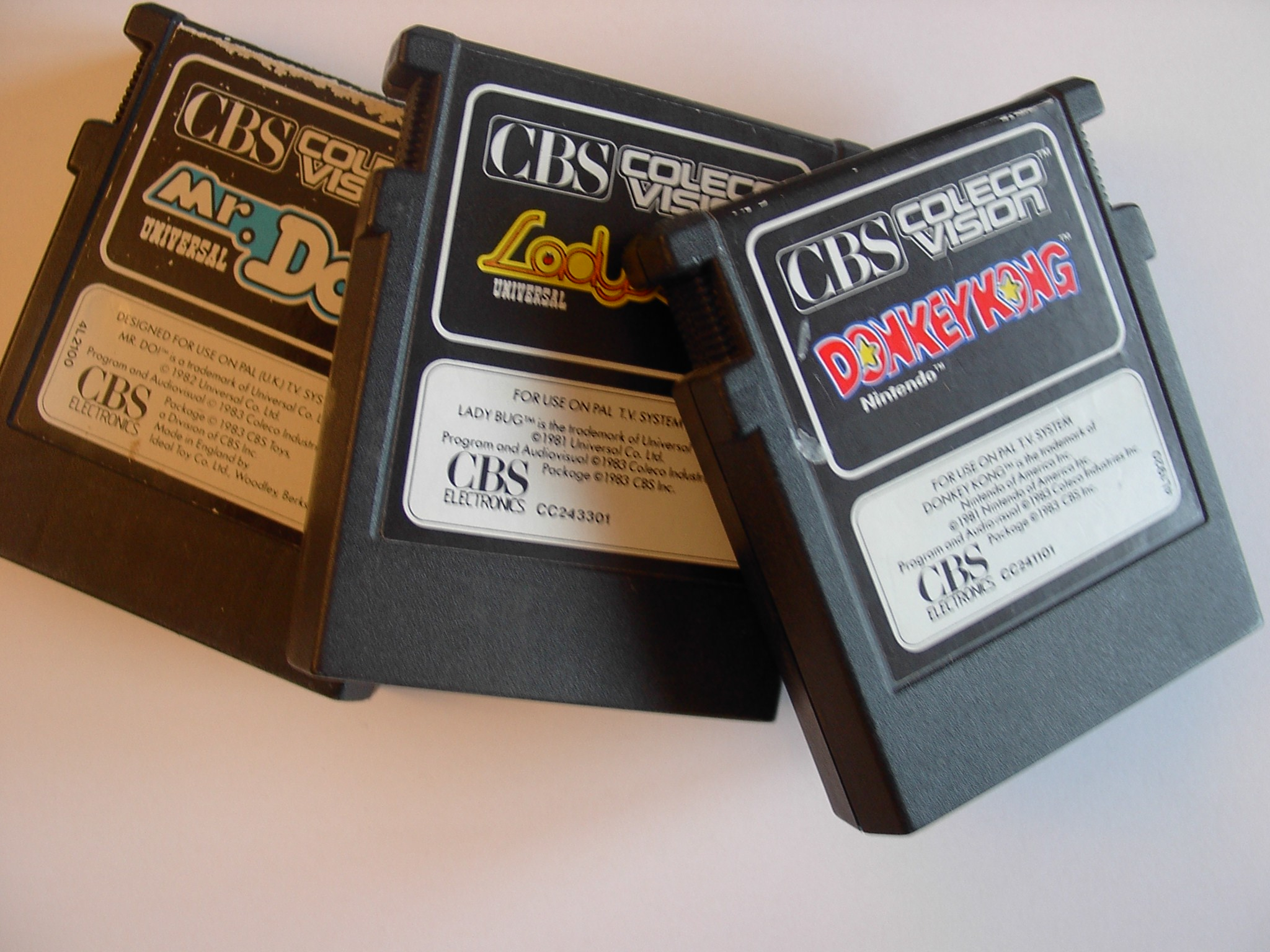
CBS ColecoVision cartridges

The ColecoVision was released in August 1982. By Christmas 1982, Coleco had sold more than 500,000 units, in part on the strength of Donkey Kong as the bundled game. ColecoVision's graphics were superior to the existing Atari 2600 and Mattel Intellivision systems, and its price was comparable to or lower than the others. Despite the company's inability to manufacture sufficient ColecoVisions that year, Coleco's 1982 sales of $500 million tripled the previous year's $178 million. ColecoVision's main competitor was the less commercially successful Atari 5200. Sales quickly passed 1 million in early 1983.

The ColecoVision was distributed by CBS Electronics outside of North America and was branded the CBS ColecoVision. In Europe, the console was released in July 1983, nearly one year after the North American release.

By the beginning of 1984, quarterly sales of the ColecoVision had dramatically decreased. In January 1985, Coleco discontinued the Adam, which was a home computer expansion for ColecoVision. By mid-1985, Coleco planned to withdraw from the video game market, and the ColecoVision was officially discontinued by October. Total sales are uncertain, but were ultimately in excess of 2 million consoles, with the console continuing to sell modestly up until its discontinuation.

In 1983, Spectravideo announced the SV-603 ColecoVision Video Game Adapter for its SV-318 computer. The company stated that the $70 product allowed users to "enjoy the entire library of exciting ColecoVision video-game cartridges".

== Hardware ==
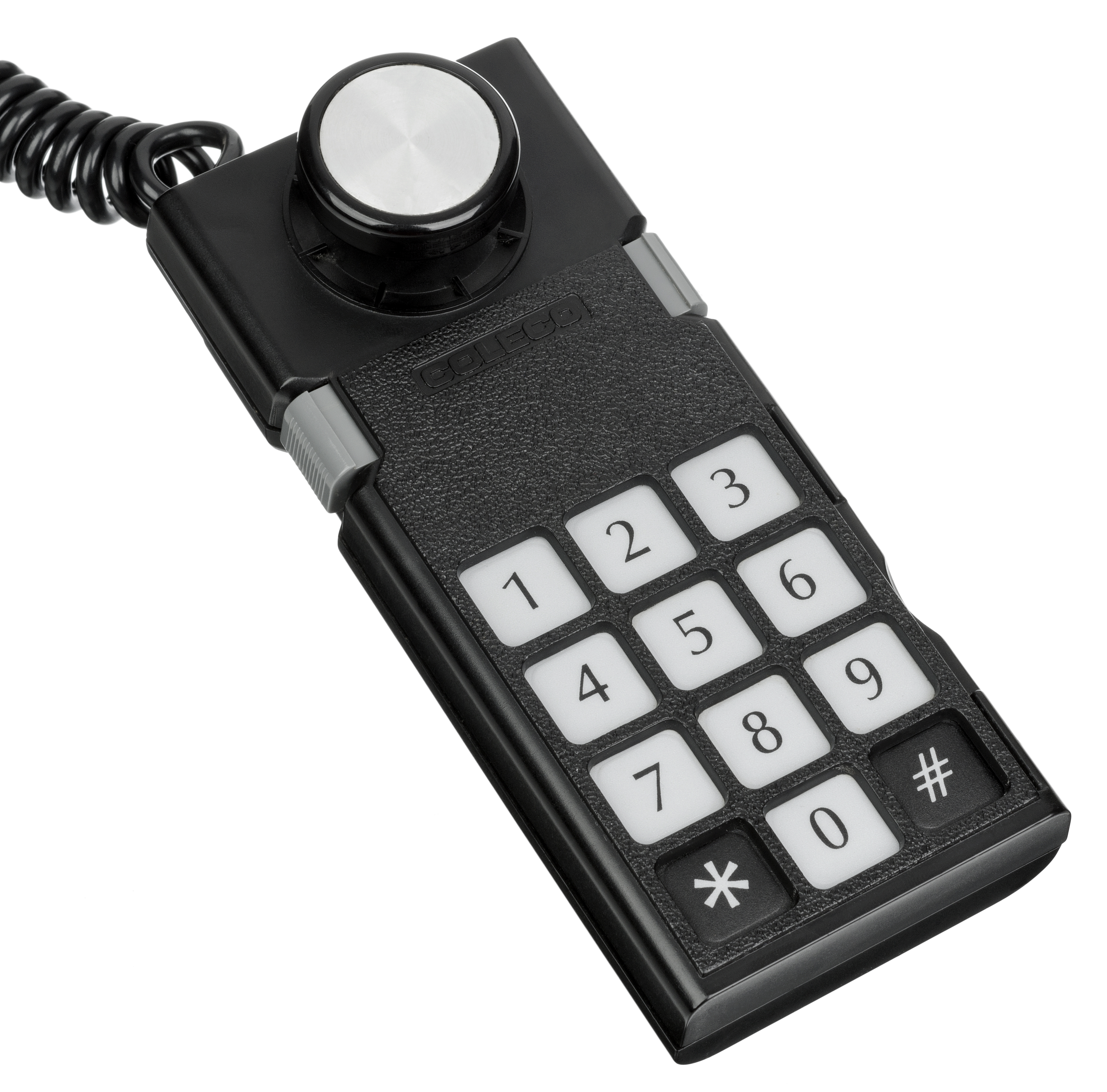
The ColecoVision Hand Controller has a number pad that can be fitted with overlays.

ColecoVision is based around the Zilog Z80 CPU and a variant of the Texas Instruments TMS9918 video chip that was introduced in 1979.

On NTSC ColecoVision consoles, all first-party cartridges and most third-party software titles feature a 12.7 second pause before presenting the game select screen. CBS Electronics reduced this pause in the BIOS to 3.3 seconds for their PAL and SECAM ColecoVision consoles.

=== Expansion Modules and accessories ===
From its introduction, Coleco highlighted the ColecoVision's hardware expandability by featuring the Expansion Module Interface on the front of the unit. These hardware expansion modules and accessories were sold separately.

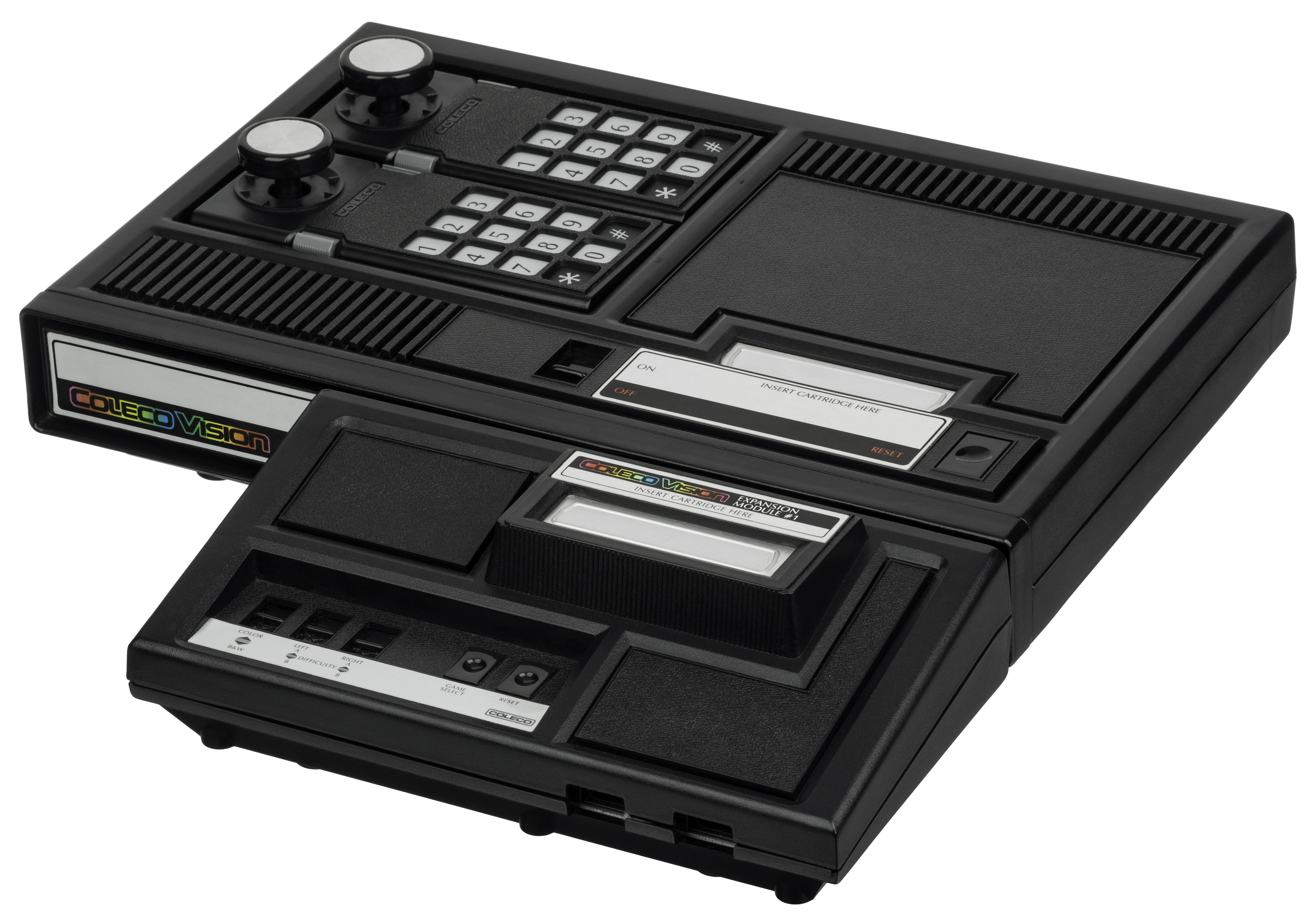
Expansion Module #1 allows the ColecoVision to play any Atari 2600 game.

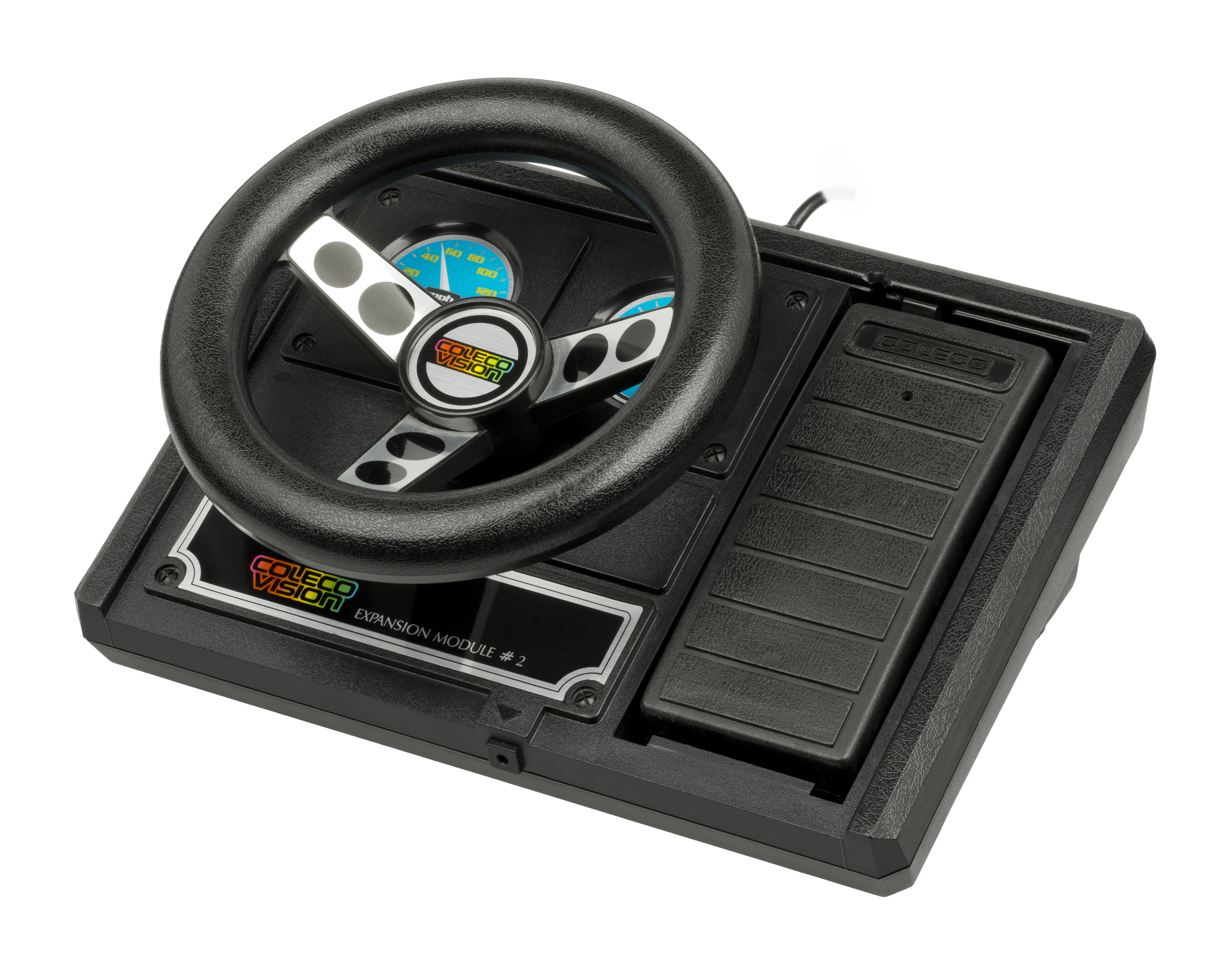
Expansion Module #2 is a steering wheel for racing games.

==== Atari 2600 expansion ====
Expansion Module #1 made the ColecoVision compatible with Atari 2600 cartridges and controllers. It leveraged the fact that the 2600 used largely off-the-shelf components and was effectively a complete set of 2600 electronics, including a reverse-engineered equivalent of the 2600's sole custom chip, the TIA. The ColecoVision console did not translate or process the game code on the 2600 cartridges; it only provided power and clock input to, and audio/video output from, the expansion module, which was otherwise entirely self-contained and could be considered the first Atari 2600 clone console. This gave the ColecoVision the largest software library of any console of its day. The expansion module prompted legal action from Atari. Coleco and Atari settled out of court, with Coleco becoming licensed under Atari's patents. The royalty-based license also applied to Coleco's Gemini game system, a stand-alone clone of the 2600.

==== Driving controller ====
Expansion Module #2 is a driving controller (steering wheel / gas pedal) that comes packaged with the cartridge Turbo. The gas pedal is a simple on/off switch. Although Coleco called the driving controller an expansion module, it actually plugs into the controller port, not the Expansion Module Interface. The driving controller is also compatible with the cartridges Destructor, Bump 'n' Jump, Pitstop, and The Dukes of Hazzard.

==== Adam computer expansion ====
Expansion Module #3 converts the ColecoVision into the Adam computer, complete with keyboard, digital data pack (DDP) cassette drive, 64 KB RAM, and printer.

==== Roller Controller ====
The Roller Controller is a trackball that comes packaged with the cartridge Slither, a conversion of the arcade game. The roller controller uses a special power connector that is not compatible with Expansion Module #3 (the Adam computer). Coleco mailed an adapter to owners of both units who complained. The other cartridge programmed to use the roller controller is Victory. A joystick mode switch on the roller controller allows it to be used with all cartridges, including WarGames, Omega Race, and Atarisoft's Centipede.

==== Super Action Controller ====
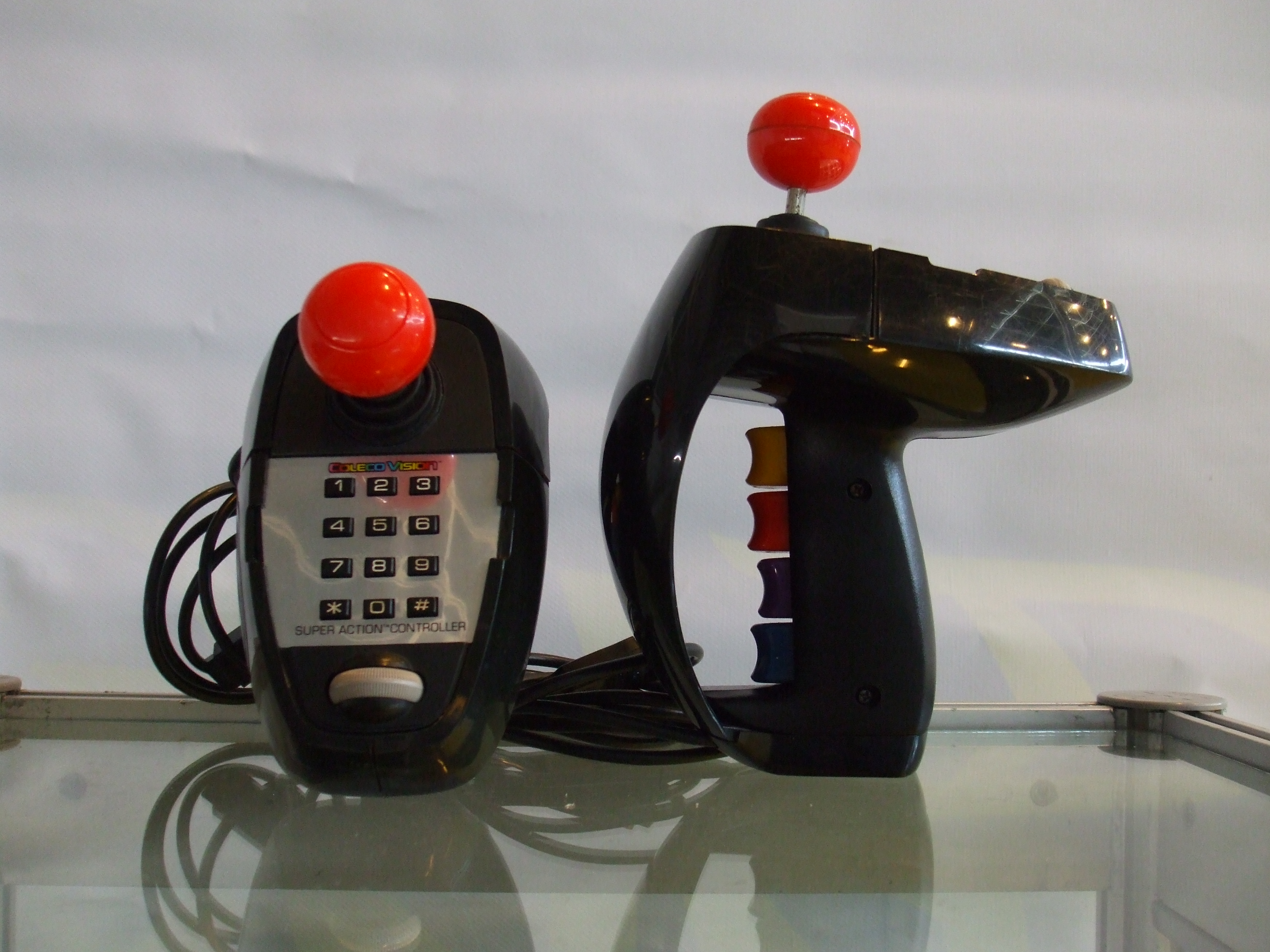
Super Action Controller

The Super Action Controller Set, available in September 1983, is a set of two handheld joystick controllers packaged with the cartridge Super Action Baseball. Each controller has a ball-top joystick, four finger-triggered action buttons, a 12-button numeric keypad, and a "speed roller". The cartridges Super Action Football, Rocky, Super Action Boxing, and a conversion of the arcade game Front Line are also designed to be used with the Super Action Controller.

==== Unreleased ====
Expansion Module #3 was originally planned to be the Super Game Module. It was advertised for an August 1983 release but was ultimately cancelled and replaced with the Adam computer expansion. The Super Game Module added a tape drive known as the Exatron Stringy Floppy with 128 KB capacity, and additional RAM, said to be 30 KB, to load and execute programs from tape. Games could be distributed on tiny tapes, called wafers, and be much larger than the 16 KB or 32 KB ROM cartridges of the day. Super Donkey Kong, with all screens and animations, Super Donkey Kong Jr, and Super Smurf Rescue were demonstrated with the Super Game Module. The Adam computer expansion with its 256 KB tape drive and 64 KB RAM fulfilled the specifications promised by the Super Game Module.

== Legacy ==
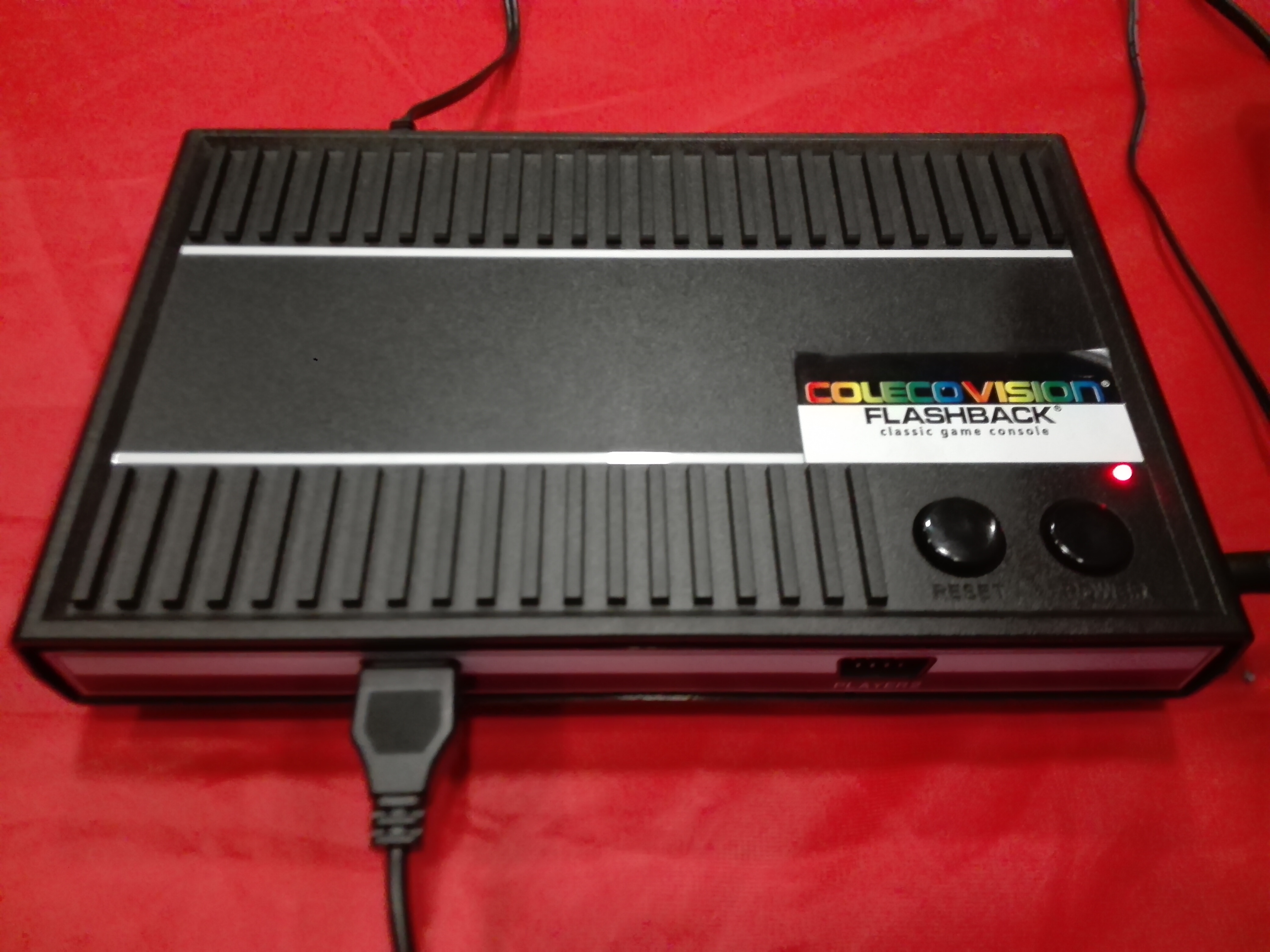
ColecoVision Flashback

Masayuki Uemura, head of Famicom development, stated that the ColecoVision set the bar that influenced how he approached the creation of the Famicom. During the creation of the Nintendo Entertainment System, Takao Sawano, chief manager of the project, brought a ColecoVision home to his family, who were impressed by the system's capability to produce smooth graphics, which contrasted with the flickering commonly seen on Atari 2600 games.

In 1986, Bit Corporation produced a ColecoVision clone called the Dina, which was sold in the United States by Telegames as the Telegames Personal Arcade.

IGN named the ColecoVision their 12th-best video-game console out of their list of 25, citing "its incredible accuracy in bringing current-generation arcade hits home".

In 1996, the first homebrew ColecoVision game was released: a Tetris clone titled Kevtris.

In 1997, Telegames released Personal Arcade Vol. 1, a collection of ColecoVision games for Microsoft Windows, and a 1998 follow-up, Colecovision Hits Volume One.

In 2012, Opcode Games released their own Super Game Module expansion, which increases RAM from 1 KB to 32 KB and adds four additional sound channels. This expansion brings the ColecoVision close to the MSX architecture standard, allowing MSX software to be more easily ported.

In 2014, AtGames began producing the ColecoVision Flashback console that includes 60 games, but not the original pack-in game, Donkey Kong.
