= 1981 in video games =

Fueled by the previous year's release of the colorful and appealing Pac-Man, the audience for arcade video games in 1981 became much wider. Pac-Man influenced maze games began appearing in arcades and on home systems. Pac-Man was the highest grossing video game for the second year in a row. Nintendo's Donkey Kong defined the platform game genre, while Konami's Scramble established scrolling shooters. The lesser known Jump Bug combined the two concepts into both the first scrolling platform game and the first platform shooter. Other arcade hits released in 1981 include Defender, Frogger, and the Galaxian sequel Galaga.

On the Apple II, Ultima I and Wizardry: Proving Grounds of the Mad Overlord each kicked off a long running role-playing game series. Atari's VCS port of Asteroids was a major hit with the console. The best selling home system around the globe was Nintendo's Game & Watch for the second year in a row.

== Financial performance ==
- The arcade video game market in the US generates $4.8 billion in revenue.
- The home video game market in the US generates $1 billion in sales revenue, with Atari remaining the market leader.
- The home video game market in Europe is worth $200 million.

=== Highest-grossing arcade games ===
The year's highest-grossing video game was Pac-Man with $1.2 billion in arcade game revenue, three times the box office revenue of the highest-grossing film Star Wars (1977) in five years.

==== Japan ====
In Japan, the following titles were the highest-grossing arcade video games of 1981, according to the annual Game Machine chart.

Rank	Title	Manufacturer	Genre
1	Donkey Kong	Nintendo	Platform
2	Janputer	Sanritsu	Mahjong
3	Pro Golf	Data East	Sports
4	Pac-Man	Namco	Maze
5	Qix	Taito	Puzzle
6	Galaga	Namco	Shoot 'em up
7	Bosconian	Namco	Shoot 'em up
8	Crazy Climber	Nichibutsu	Climbing
9	Crush Roller	Kural	Maze
10	Grand Champion	Taito	Racing

==== United States ====
In the United States, the following titles were the top three highest-grossing arcade games of 1981, according to the annual Cash Box and RePlay arcade charts.

Rank	Play Meter	Cash Box	RePlay	Revenue	Genre
1	Pac-Man			$1,000,000,000	Maze
2	Defender			Unknown	Shoot 'em up
3	Unknown	Asteroids		Unknown	Shoot 'em up

The following titles were the top-grossing arcade games of each month in 1981, according to the Play Meter and RePlay arcade charts.

Month	Play Meter	RePlay	Ref
January	Pac-Man	Asteroids	
February	Pac-Man	Asteroids	
March	Pac-Man	Asteroids	
April	Pac-Man	Defender	
May	Pac-Man	Defender	
June	Pac-Man	Scramble	
July	Unknown	Pac-Man	
August	Defender	Defender	
September	Gorf	Defender	
October	Donkey Kong	Defender	
November	Unknown	Defender	
December	Vanguard	Pac-Man	
1981	Pac-Man		

=== Best-selling home video games ===
The following titles were the best-selling home video games in 1981.

Rank	Title	Platform	Developer	Publisher	Release year	Genre	Sales
1	Space Invaders	Atari VCS	Taito	Atari, Inc.	1980	Shoot 'em up	2,964,137
2	Warlords	Atari VCS	Atari, Inc.		1981	Action	936,861
3	Breakout	Atari VCS	Atari, Inc.		1978	Action	838,635
4	Night Driver	Atari VCS	Atari, Inc.		1980	Racing	779,547
5	Asteroids	Atari VCS	Atari, Inc.		1981	Shoot 'em up	407,090
5	Football	Atari VCS	Atari, Inc.		1979	Sports (American football)	Unknown

=== Best-selling home systems ===
Rank	System(s)	Manufacturer(s)	Type	Generation	Sales	Ref
1	Game & Watch	Nintendo	Handheld	—N/a	4,000,000+	
2	Atari Video Computer System (VCS)	Atari, Inc.	Console	Second	3,600,000	
3	Intellivision	Mattel	Console	Second	1,000,000+	
4	Atari 400/800	Atari, Inc.	Computer	8-bit	300,000	
5	ZX81	Sinclair Research	Computer	8-bit	250,000+	
6	TRS-80	Tandy Corporation	Computer	8-bit	250,000	
7	Apple II	Apple Inc.	Computer	8-bit	210,000	
8	PET	Commodore	Computer	8-bit	40,000	
9	IBM PC	IBM	Computer	8-bit / 16-bit	35,000	

== Events ==
=== Magazines ===
- January – Atari computer magazine ANALOG Computing begins 9 years of publication. Most issues include at least one BASIC game and one machine language game.
- November – The British video game magazine Computer and Video Games (C&VG) starts.
- Winter – Arnie Katz and Bill Kunkel found Electronic Games, the first magazine on video games and generally recognized as the beginning of video game journalism.

=== Business ===
- New companies: DK'Tronics, Games by Apollo, Gebelli Software, Imagic, Spectravision, Starpath, Synapse Software
- Defunct: APF Electronics

== Births ==
=== May ===
- May 6 – David 'mamehaze' Haywood: Legendary MAME programmer

== Notable releases ==
=== Games ===
Arcade

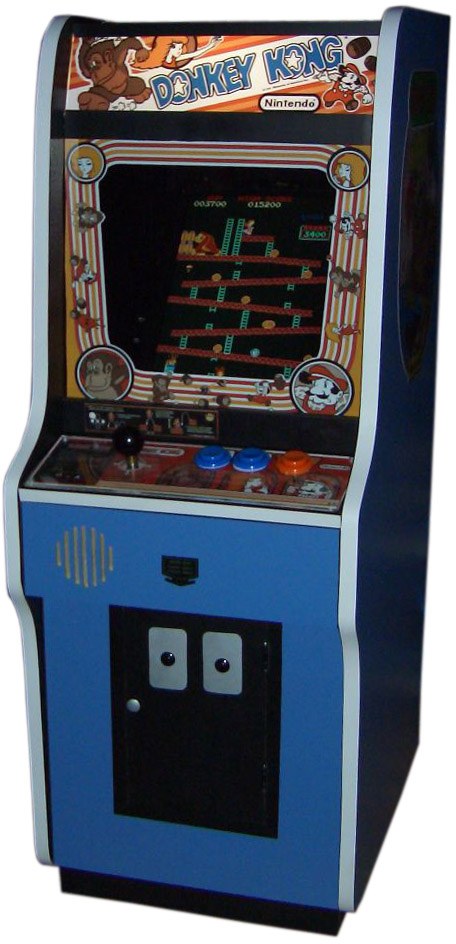
Donkey Kong

- February – Konami releases Scramble, the first side-scrolling shooter with forced scrolling and multiple distinct levels.
- February – Williams Electronics releases influential scrolling shooter Defender.
- July 9 – Nintendo releases Donkey Kong, which introduces the characters of Donkey Kong and Mario, and sets the template for the platform game genre. It is also one of the first video games with an integral storyline.
- August – Konami releases Frogger.
- September – Namco releases Galaga, the sequel to Galaxian which becomes more popular than the original.
- October – Frogger is distributed in North America by Sega-Gremlin.
- October 18 – Sega releases Turbo, a racing game with a third-person rear-view perspective.
- October 21 – Williams Electronics releases Stargate, the sequel to Defender.
- October – Rock-Ola's Fantasy is the first game with a continue feature.
- October – Atari, Inc. releases Tempest, one of the first games to use Atari's Color-QuadraScan vector display technology. It was also the first game to allow the player to choose their starting level (a system Atari dubbed "SkillStep").
- November – Namco releases Bosconian, a multidirectional shooter with voice.
- December – Jump Bug, the first scrolling platform game, developed by Hoei/Coreland and Alpha Denshi, is distributed in North America by Rock-Ola under license from Sega.
- Midway releases fixed-shooter Gorf with multiple distinct stages.
- Taito releases abstract, twin-stick shooter Space Dungeon.
- Data East releases the vertically-scrolling isometric maze game Treasure Island.

Console

- Atari, Inc.'s port of Asteroids is a major release for the Atari VCS, and is the first game for the system to use bank-switching.
- Mattel releases Utopia for Intellivision, one of the first city construction games and possibly the first sim game for a console.

Computer

- June – Ultima is released, beginning a successful computer role-playing game series.
- September – Wizardry: Proving Grounds of the Mad Overlord for the Apple II is the first in a computer role-playing franchise that eventually spans eight games.
- IBM and Microsoft include the game DONKEY.BAS with the IBM PC, arguably the first IBM PC compatible game.
- Muse Software releases the stealth action adventure Castle Wolfenstein for the Apple II.
- The Atari Program Exchange publishes Caverns of Mars, a vertically scrolling shooter, and wargame Eastern Front (1941), both for the Atari 8-bit computers. APX also sells the source code to Eastern Front.
- Epyx releases turn-based monster game Crush, Crumble and Chomp!.
- BudgeCo's Raster Blaster sparks interest in more realistic Apple II pinball simulations and is the precursor to Pinball Construction Set.
- Infocom releases Zork II: The Wizard of Frobozz.

=== Hardware ===
Arcade

- July – the Namco Warp & Warp arcade system board is released.
- October – the VCO Object, the first arcade system board dedicated to pseudo-3D, sprite-scaling graphics, debuts with the release of Turbo.

Computer

- March 5 – Timex releases the Sinclair Research ZX81 in the UK, which is significantly less expensive than other computers on the market.
- June – Texas Instruments releases the TI-99/4A, an update to 1979's TI-99/4.
- August 12 – the IBM Personal Computer is released for US$1,565, with 16K RAM, no disk drives, and 4-color CGA graphics.
- Astrovision distributes the Bally Computer System after buying the rights from Bally/Midway.
- Acorn Computers Ltd releases the BBC Micro home computer.
- Commodore Business Machines releases the VIC-20 home computer.
- NEC releases the PC-8801 home computer in Japan.

Handheld

- November – Nintendo's Game & Watch is released in Sweden.
- Microvision is discontinued.

== See also ==
- 1981 in games
