= Zaccaria (company) =

Arcade game companies

- Industry: Interactive entertainment
- Founded: 1974
- Defunct: 1990
- Fate: Bankruptcy
- Headquarters: Bologna, Italy
- Products: Pinball and arcade machines
- Owner: Marino, Franco and Natale Zaccaria
- Website: tecnoplay.com/eng/home.php

Zaccaria (later briefly operating as Mr. Game before ending production) was an Italian manufacturer of pinball and arcade machines that operated in Bologna from 1974 until 1990. The factory was sold to tecnoplay.

== History ==
The company was founded as a manufacturer of pinball arcade games in Bologna by the three brothers Marino, Franco and Natale Zaccaria. The logo consists of their initials. Zaccaria was led by Marino Zaccaria, a former manager of a bar near Bologna.

In 1975 it began exporting to other European countries, followed by the rest of the world including Japan, Australia, and America. At their peak, Zaccaria was the third largest manufacturer of pinball machines in the world after Bally and Williams. The company also entered into the video arcade game sector in the late 1970s. They both licensed games and developed games of their own design.

Zaccaria was briefly reorganized under the label Mr. Game before ending production. The company Mr. Game produced pinball machines from 1988 until 1990. Under the Mr. Game label, the company introduced a radical redesign of the traditional pinball cabinet. The commonly known rectangular cabinet containing the 'playfield' was updated into a more modern look with a different shaped box, and trigger buttons for flipper control. The legs were also more angular in support compared to the mostly vertical legs used by other manufacturers. Additionally, the 'backbox' eliminated the traditional numeric or alpha-numeric score and status displays in favor of a small color TV screen, sometimes containing video game elements.

After bankruptcy, the factory in Bologna of Zaccaria was sold to tecnoplay in San Marino, that produced pinball machines from 1987 - 1989 and is still in business as an importer, reseller and maintainer of pinball machines, spare parts, arcade and vending machines and other amusement games. The Zaccaria family retained a substantial share of technoplay. Tecnoplay is managed by Mauro Zaccaria, the son of Marino Zaccaria, one of the founders of the company Zaccaria.

There are at least 47 different Zaccaria pinball machines known to exist although some are just variations of the same game.

== Pinball machines ==
The artwork for most pinball machines was hand-drawn by Lorenzo Rimondini, and while his artwork was never signed, some such as Aerobatics include his initials. Star's Phoenix, and New Star's Phoenix are the only machines to include multiball.

=== Zaccaria ===
- Tropical (1974)
- Cine Star (1974)
- Top Hand (1974)
- Granada (1974)
- Strike (1974)
- Red Show (1975)
- Lucky Fruit (1975)
- Ten Stars (1976)
- Moon Flight (1976)
- Wood's Queen (1976)
- Aerobatics (1977)
- Circus (1977)
- Combat (1977)
- Nautilus (1977)
- Universe (1977, 4 player version of Ten Stars)
- Supersonic (1977)
- Queen's Castle (1978)
- Winter Sports (1978, uses the same layout as Ski Jump)
- House of Diamonds (1978, solid-state version of Queens' Castle)
- Strike (1978, solid-state version of 1974 Strike)
- Future World (1978)
- Ski Jump (1978)
- Shooting the Rapids (1979)
- Hot Wheels (1979)
- Space City (1979, one player version of Future World)
- Fire Mountain (1980)
- Star God (1980)
- Space Shuttle (1980)
- Earth Wind Fire (1981)
- Locomotion (1981)
- Soccer Kings (1982, released in the US by Bhuzac)
- Pinball Champ '82 (1982)
- Pinball Champ (1983, released in the US by Bhuzac) (re-release of Pinball Champ '82 with modified artwork)
- Time Machine (1983)
- Farfalla (1983, released in the US by Bhuzac)
- Devil Riders (1984, released in the US by Bhuzac)
- Magic Castle (1984, released in the US by Bhuzac)
- Robot (1985)
- Clown (1985)
- Pool Champion (1985)
- Mystic Star (1986)
- Blackbelt (1986)
- Mexico ’86 (1986)
- Zankor (1986)
- Spooky (1987)
- Star's Phoenix (1987)
- New Star's Phoenix (1987)

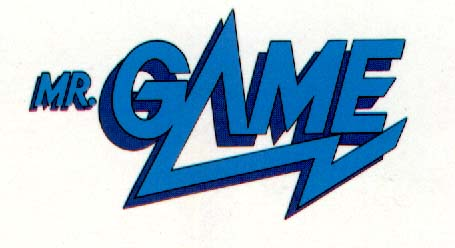
The Mr. Game logo

=== Mr. Game ===
- Dakar (1988)
- Fast Track
- Mac Attack (1989)
- Motor Show (1989, released in the US by United Artists Theatre Amusements)
- Sofficini Dakar
- World Cup '90 (1990)

=== Tecnoplay ===
- Devil King (1987)
- Scramble (1987)
- X-Force (1987)
- Space Team (1989)
- Hi-Ball (1989)

== Zaccaria arcade machines ==
- TV-Joker (1974), PONG clone
- Circus (1977), licensed Exidy Circus
- The Invaders (1978), Space Invaders clone
- Astro Wars (1979), port of Data East Astro Fighter
- Dodgem (1979), port of Sega Head On
- Galaxia (1979), port of Namco Galaxian
- Quasar (1980), Zaccaria Original, distributed in US by US Billiards
- Moon Crest (1980), Quasar machine with a space fortress side art
- Firebird (1980), licensed Amstar Phoenix
- Space Pirate (1980), copy of Cinematronics' Rip Off
- Puckman (1980), copy of Namco Pac-Man
- Scramble (1980), licensed Konami Scramble
- Buck Rogers (1981), licensed Sega Buck Rogers
- Vanguard (1981), licensed SNK Vanguard
- Super Cobra (1981), licensed Konami Super Cobra
- Frogger (1981), licensed Konami Frogger
- Crazy Kong (1981), licensed Falcon Crazy Kong
- Pac and Paint (1981), port of Kural Crush Roller
- Zaxxon (1981), port of Sega Zaxxon
- Hustler (1981), licensed Video Hustler
- Comidar (1981), licensed Konami Amidar
- Fitter (1981), licensed Round Up
- Laser Battle (1981), Zaccaria Original, distributed in US by Midway by the title Lazarian
- Scorpion (1982), ?
- Sea Battle (1982), ?
- Dribbling (1982), port of Dribbling by Model Racing
- Jump Bug (1982), port Rock-Ola Jump Bug
- Fantasy (1982), port Rock-Ola Fantasy
- Cat and Mouse (1982), Zaccaria Original
- Eyes (1982), licensed Techstar Eyes
- Mr. Do! (1982), licensed Universal Mr. Do!
- Eggor (1983), Telko Eggor
- Money Money (1983, released in the US by Bhuzac), Zaccaria Original
- Hyper Sports (1983), licensed Konami Hyper Sports
- Hyper Olympics (1983), licensed Konami Hyper Olympics
- Shooting Gallery (1984, released in the US by Bhuzac), developed by Seatongrove
- Jack Rabbit (1984, released in the US by Bhuzac), Zaccaria Original

== Digital recreations ==
Magic Pixel Kft. released Zaccaria Pinball for Android and iOS as well as Windows on Steam which provides digital recreations of classic Zaccaria pinball machines. Versions for OS X as well as Linux were released on August 31, 2017. In July 2018, it was released for Nintendo Switch, April 2019 for Xbox One, and August 2020 for PlayStation 4. The game offers 42 of the original Zaccaria pinball machines, excluding New Star's Phoenix, Queen's Castle, Ski Jump, Space City, Ten Stars, and Ten Up. It also includes original digital tables themed after the physical machines, imagining them in more modern styles, as well as in the 1940s Retro styles.

== See also ==
- Playmatic, a former Spanish company of pinball machines
- Inder, another former Spanish company of pinball and arcade machines
- Taito of Brazil, a former Brazilian company of pinball and arcade machines
- Maresa, a former Spanish company of pinball machines
- Sega, S.A. SONIC, a former Spanish company of pinball and arcade machines
