= Taito of Brazil =

Pinball and arcade game manufacturer

Taito Do Brasil
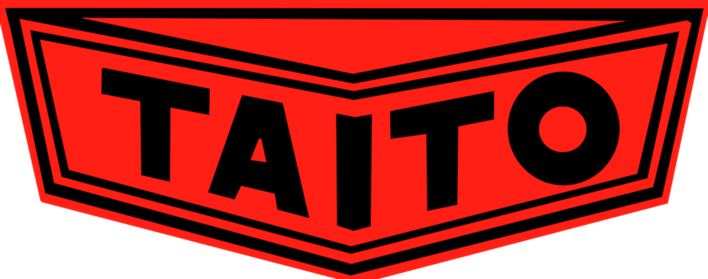
- Industry: Pinball and arcade video games
- Founded: São Paulo, Brazil (1968)
- Founder: Abraham Kogan
- Defunct: 1985
- Parent: Taito

Taito of Brazil (Portuguese: Taito do Brasil) was a pinball and arcade manufacturer located in São Paulo, Brazil.

== History ==
The company originally started as Clover Electronic Amusement in 1968 and was renamed Taito of Brazil in 1972 by Abraham "Abba" Kogan, the son of the founder of the parent company Taito in Japan. This subsidiary was originally an importer of existing U.S. and Japanese machine components to be assembled within the country. However, the taxation on imports had been growing steadily, and the government's belief that pinball is a game of chance and considered a gambling machine, led to strict import rules. By 1976, within rules created by the Electronic Processing Activities Coordinating Committee (CAPRE), it became illegal to import pinball machines. This created a problem, since the popularity of arcade games in Brazil had been growing exponentially for many years.

In 1978, with an influx of cash from the parent company, Taito of Brazil was able to build new facilities to accommodate the new standard of electronic solid state games being produced by other manufacturers. Because of the import changes, companies in Brazil needed to become innovative, and began creating imitations, or close representations of already existing products that could no longer be acquired. This included pinball and arcade games. Taito of Brazil began creating games by copying existing designs of successful pinball machines made elsewhere. Where some games were nearly identical in a physical sense, others had greatly altered artwork. In most cases of games created to look like their counterparts made by other manufacturers, the machine name was changed, sound effects altered, and often went through a modification of game rules. Such was the case with a Taito-made game called, Oba Oba. The playfield layout was a copy of Bally Playboy but with altered artwork, and now based on a playhouse located in Rio de Janeiro. Where others were much closer to the original games, such as the case with Drakor, which is nearly identical to Gorgar from Williams Electronics.

Taito of Brazil's most commercially successful pinball machine was Cosmic, a clone of Stern Electronics Galaxy.

Additionally, starting in the late 1970s, Taito of Brazil began creating arcade game clones known as bootlegs as well. The only hardware available to them was an arcade board originally created by Japanese company, Nichibutsu for a game called, Moon Cresta (1980). Bootleg versions of existing games were altered to run on this hardware. Other minor changes were implemented to the software code including text, and sound effects. In total, 21 different adaptations had been produced, including popular games such as, Zig Zag, a redeployment of Dig Dug from Namco, and Missile X, a clone of Missile Command from Atari.

Taito of Brazil closed its doors in 1985 after a series of unfortunate events. Michael Kogan, the founder of the parent company, Taito Corporation had died on a business trip to the U.S. in early 1984. This left much of the control of the Japanese Taito Corporation to the company employees, who were less enthusiastic about its subsidiaries. This added to a sharp decrease in the popularity of pinball worldwide as the result of the popularity of arcade video games prompted the decision to close down Taito of Brazil in 1985. The company was liquidated and all its debts honored without the need for bankruptcy.

Kyocera purchased what remained of Taito Corporation in 1986.

== Taito of Brazil pinball machines ==
Most manufacture dates are unknown

=== Electro-mechanical ===
- Check Mate
- Crown Soccer Special (1967)
- Lucky Strike

=== Solid state electronics ===
Shown in parentheses is the original machine it is based on

- Apache (Playfield layout the same as Fast Draw (Gottlieb, 1975))
- Black Hole (similar to Black Hole (Gottlieb, 1981))
- Cavaleiro Negro (similar to Black Knight (Williams Electronics, 1980))
- Cosmic (Nearly identical to Galaxy (Stern Electronics, 1980))
- Drakor (Nearly identical to Gorgar (Williams Electronics, 1979))
- Fire Action (Similar to Firepower (Williams Electronics, 1980))
- Fire Action Deluxe (playfield layout is the same as Firepower II (Williams Electronics, 1983) but contains the artwork of the original Firepower)
- Football (similar to World Cup (Williams Electronics, 1978))
- Gemini 2000 (similar to Flight 2000 (Stern Electronics, 1980) in concept, however playfield layout is that of Centaur (Bally, 1981))
- Gork (Similar to Sky Jump (Gottlieb, 1974))
- Hawkman (Similar playfield layout as Fathom (Bally, 1981) but with different artwork and rules)
- Hot Ball (Similar to Eight Ball (Bally, 1977))
- Lady Luck (Featuring similar artwork as Mata Hari (Bally, 1978))
- Lucky Strike (bowling theme)
- Lunelle (Playfield layout is that of Alien Poker (Williams Electronics, 1980) but with different artwork)
- Meteor (nearly identical to Meteor (Stern Electronics, 1979))
- Mr. Black (playfield layout is similar to Defender (Williams Electronics, 1982) but with a different theme)
- Oba Oba (Playfield layout is the same as Playboy (Bally, 1978) but is themed after a club in Rio de Janeiro)
- Polar Explorer (similar to Pinball Champ (Zaccaria, 1983))
- Rally (similar to Skateball (Bally, 1980) but missing a flipper)
- Roman Victory (Roman themed game)
- Shark (Nautical theme)
- Shock (nearly identical to Flash (Williams Electronics, 1979))
- Snake Machine (some game elements taken from Viper (Stern Electronics, 1981))
- Space Shuttle (nearly identical to Space Shuttle (Williams Electronics, 1984) made under the label 'Mecatronics')
- Speed Test (playfield layout of Vector (Bally, 1982) but with different artwork)
- Sultan (nearly identical to Sinbad (Gottlieb, 1978))
- Sure Shot (similar to Eight Ball Deluxe (Bally, 1981))
- Titan (similar to Barracora (Williams Electronics, 1981))
- Vegas (Nearly identical to another Taito game, Lady Luck, but with alterations)
- Volcano (similar to Volcano (Gottlieb, 1981))
- Volley (Volleyball themed game)
- Zarza (similar to Xenon (Bally, 1980) but with different sound effects)

== Arcade games produced ==
Shown in parentheses is the original game it is based on.

- Sandwich/X-salada (BurgerTime)
- Zig Zag (Dig Dug)
- Kong (adapted from Crazy Kong, another Donkey Kong clone)
- Big Flyer (Fly Boy)
- Jump (Frogger)
- Fantastic (Galaga)
- Batalha Galactica (Galaxian)
- Super Fantastic (Gaplus)
- Star Crest (Moon Cresta)
- Stock Car (New Rally-X)
- Condor (Phoenix)
- Piranha (Phunky Fish)
- Polaris II (Polaris)
- Commander (Scramble)
- Fighting (Super Cobra)
- Time Fighter (Time Pilot)
- Olympics (Track & Field)
- Caçapa (Video Hustler)
- Columbia (Xevious)

== See also ==
- Sega, S.A. SONIC, a former subsidiary of SEGA in Spain
- Playmatic, a former Spanish company of pinball machines
- Inder, another former Spanish company of pinball and arcade machines
- Zaccaria (company), a former Italian company of pinball and arcade machines
- Maresa, a former Spanish company of pinball machines
