= DECO Cassette System =

Arcade system by Data East

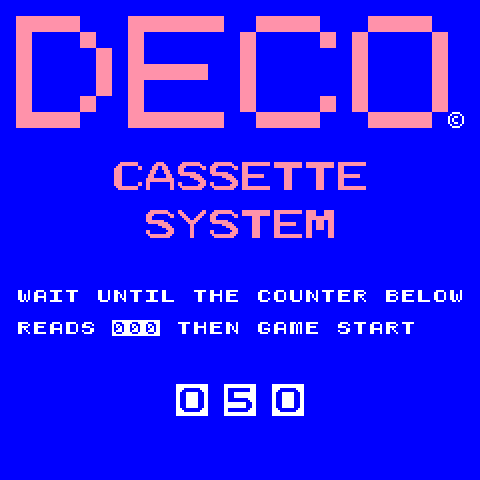
DECO Cassette System loading screen

The DECO Cassette System is an arcade system that was introduced by Data East in October 1980. It was the first standardised arcade system that allowed arcade owners to change games. Developed in 1979, it was released in Japan in 1980 and then North America in 1981.

The arcade owner would buy a base cabinet, while the games were stored on standard Microcassette tapes. The arcade owner would insert the cassette and a key module (Note: This was an early form of copy protection, to ensure that the tapes would not be illegally copied by unscrupulous arcade owners. Some titles had to be digitally signed by Data East; others were encrypted.) into the cabinet. When the machine was powered on, the program from the tape would be copied into the cabinet's RAM chips; this process took about two to three minutes. Afterwards, the game could be played freely until the machine was powered off.

The machine contained three processors. The main central processing unit (CPU) was the DECO 222, a modified version of the MOS 6502 running at 750 kHz. This was largely identical to the normal 6502 but included hardware encryption that worked with the cassettes. A second unmodified 6502 running at 500 kHz was used to program the sound, which was produced by two General Instrument AY-3-8910 sound chips running at 1.5 MHz. Finally, an Intel 8041 running at 6 MHz, sometimes known as a I8X41, was used to control the cassette subsystem.

== Game list ==
In bold characters are the video games that were also released in dedicated arcade cabinets. †=unreleased

- 01: **Highway Chase** (also known as Mad Alien)
- 02: Sengoku Ninja Tai (also known as Ninja)
- 03: Manhattan
- 04: **Terranean**
- 05: Missile Sprinter †
- 06: Nebula
- 07: Astro Fantasia
- 08: The Tower
- 09: Super Astro Fighter
- 10: Ocean to Ocean
- 11: **Lock 'n' Chase**
- 12: The DECO Kid (also known as Flash Boy)
- 13: **Tournament Pro Golf** (also known as Pro Golf or 18 Hole Pro Golf)
- 14: DS Telejan
- 15: Lucky Poker
- 16: **Treasure Island**
- 17: Bobitt †
- 18: Explorer
- 19: **Disco No. 1** (also known as Sweet Heart)
- 20: Tornado
- 21: **Mission-X**
- 22: **Pro Tennis**
- 23: Bramzon
- 24: Tsumego Kaishō
- 25: Angler Dangler (also known as Fishing)
- 26: **BurgerTime** (also known as Hamburger)
- 27: **Bump 'n' Jump** (also known as Burnin' Rubber)
- 28: Cluster Buster (also known as Graplop)
- 29: **Rootin' Tootin'** (also known as La-Pa-Pa)
- 30: Skater
- 31: **Pro Bowling**
- 32: Night Star
- 33: **Pro Soccer**
- 34: **Super Doubles Tennis**
- 35: Flying Ball (also known as Bumpoline)
- 36: Boomer Rang'r (also known as Genesis)
- 37: Zeroize
- 38: Scrum Try
- 39: Peter Pepper's Ice Cream Factory
- 40: Fighting Ice Hockey
- 41: Ōzumō - The Grand Sumo
- 42: Hello Gateball
- 43: Yellow Cab
- 44: Boulder Dash
- UX-7: **Tokyo Mie Shinryōjo** (Tokyo MIE Clinic)
- UX-9: Geinōjin Shikaku Shiken

== Reception ==
In Japan, the Game Machine list of highest-grossing arcade video games of 1981 listed Pro Golf at number three and Tele-Jan at number thirteen. On the list of highest-grossing arcade video games of 1982, Burnin' Rubber (Bump 'n' Jump) was number nine, BurgerTime (Hamburger) was number eleven, and Pro Tennis was number fifteen. Game Machine later listed Pro Soccer as the top-grossing new table arcade cabinet in September 1983, and Scrum Try topped the table arcade game chart in April 1984.

== Legacy ==
It was the first interchangeable arcade system board, developed in 1979 before it was released in 1980. It inspired Sega's Convert-a-Game system, which released in 1981. Later interchangeable arcade systems followed from other companies, such as the Nintendo VS. System in 1984.

The DECO Cassette System was revolutionary for its time, but Data East discontinued it in 1985 due to arcade owners' complaints about the potential unreliability of both the tapes (which could be demagnetized easily) and key modules (which EPROMs went bad after a time), as well as the poor quality of most of its games (Note: And to make things worse, a few of its games which proved popular were also released in dedicated machines with conventional ROM-based boards, which in turn gave arcade owners even less of a reason to invest into the DECO Cassette System.) and the medium's long loading times. Despite its bad qualities, the DECO Cassette System was better received in Japan where many more games were released for it.

John Szczepaniak of Hardcore Gaming 101 considers the DECO scrolling action game Flash Boy (1981), based on the manga and anime series Astro Boy (1952–1968), to be sophisticated for its time. It had an energy bar that gradually depletes over time, and some of which can be sacrificed for temporary invincibility. It had punch attacks rather than shooting and a type of combo mechanic where, when an enemy explodes, debris can destroy other enemies. There is also a boss battle at the end of each level as well as bi-directional side-scrolling similar to Defender. Data East released two versions of the game, a side-scrolling one and a vertical scrolling one.

== See also ==
- Arcade conversion
- Neo Geo
- Nintendo VS. System
- Nintendo Super System
- PlayChoice-10
