= Centaur (pinball) =

1981 pinball machine

- Manufacturer: Bally
- Release date: October 1981
- System: Bally MPU AS-2518-35
- Design: Jim Patla
- Artwork: Paul Faris
- Mechanics: Irv Grabel
- Production run: 3,700 units (Centaur); 1,550 units (Centaur II)

Centaur is a pinball machine released by Bally, and the last pinball machine designed solely by Jim Patla. The game was inspired by the classic Bally's 1956 Balls-A-Poppin, the first flipper pinball machine with multiball. Because of its success, the pinball machine was re-released in 1983 as Centaur II. The re-release has only a different backbox and was otherwise unchanged.

== Design ==
In early stages of the design process the game was called "Video Classic". The idea to make the playfield black and white came from the artist Paul Faris, along with the fantasy theme of the centaur. The designer Jim Patla then worked out dialogue and features to fit the theme. The game released after video game successes such as Pac-Man and Defender, and aspects of the design were influenced by video games. Similar to attract modes in contemporary video games Centaur implements an attract mode demonstrating its features when a flipper button is pushed; balls are launched to show it is a multiball game, and the game demonstrates its main features.

The production of the artwork began with a sketch of the backglass which defined the look of the game. The artwork for the cabinet and backbox was then produced, followed by the playfield, and finally the completed design for the backglass. This backglass design shows the centaur, a half man and half horse creature astride a motor bike, with a lady in a lace-up leather suit. The only coloured elements on the playfield are red pop bumpers and lights.

Centaur II uses surplus cabinets from an earlier game, Rapid Fire.

Centaur pinball machine, with backglass

== Gameplay and layout ==
The game has five main features, and has adjustments for most of these features to change the difficulty of the game.

The orb feature uses a set of drop targets located below the pop bumpers labelled O-R-B-S. A player hitting all of these targets out of order lights a captured orb light above the flippers. Completing them in order can then launch an additional ball into play. The guardian feature launches an additional ball into play if a captured orb light is lit and the lower inlane/outlane lights are completed. Two targets on the playfield releases all accumulated balls for a maximum of five ball multiball. Balls lit by one player are not passed on to the next player.

The "Queen's Chamber" is located at the top left of the machine and consists of a captive ball with four in-line drop-targets followed by a spot-target behind it. This spot-target is one of the targets that starts multiball.

The sequence feature uses four drop targets on the right of the machine. These are labelled 1-2-3-4 and when completed in sequence light a target at the top right of the playfield which can be hit to start multiball. These targets are also used to advance the bonus multiplier.

The bonus feature is a score up to 79,000 points multiplied by a bonus multiplier up to 5x and is collected when a ball is lost.

A 1984 issue of Pinball Player gave tips and strategies of how to play the game.

== Reception ==
Pinball Player said in 1997 that its not only a brilliant game, but a classic design.

== Digital versions ==
Centaur released as a licensed table of The Pinball Arcade on several platforms in 2013, and removed from all digital stores on June 30, 2018, when the license with WMS expired.

== Remake ==
Haggis Pinball announced a limited edition remake of Centaur in 2023, but the company went bankrupt in 2024 after only manufacturing some of these.

== Similar games ==
Bell Games in Italy created a conversion kit to convert Centaur into a differently themed game called Fantasy. Taito of Brazil copied the layout of Centaur, and used artwork very similar to Stern Electronics Flight 2000 to create Gemini 2000.
