= Zaccaria Pinball =

2025 video game

- Developer: Magic Pixel
- Publisher: Magic Pixel
- Platform: Linux; macOS; Microsoft Windows
- Release: October 16, 2025
- Genre: Pinball
- Modes: Single-player, Multiplayer

Zaccaria Pinball is a pinball video game developed and published by Magic Pixel. It released into early access for Windows in June 2016, with full release in October 2025 by which time the game had over 140 tables; further tables were subsequently released. iOS, Android, Nintendo Switch, Xbox One, and PlayStation 4 (North America region only) had smaller releases with a limited number of tables.

== Gameplay ==
Each table can be played in several different modes. Some tables can be unlocked by collecting achievements. The game includes a story and campaign mode.

== Development ==
A version of the game was initially released for iOS and Android, and a PC version was first announced in 2015. In January 2016 the developer listed the game on Steam Greenlight. and launched into early access on Steam on June 17, 2016 with 38 tables based on physical Zaccaria tables, including Time Machine as a free to play table.

A VR mode was released as a single DLC in October 2016.

In 2016, a series of Remake tables began to be released. Some of these were based on the themes and features of the original Zaccaria tables, but with new layouts; others were more loosely based on the original. In August 2017, support for Mac and Linux (Steam OS) was added. Additional tables based on earlier pinball games by Magic Pixel were released as Award tables, unlocked by gaining achievements or table tasks in the game, or unlocked by buying DLC. These are table designs previously used in the Age of Pinballs game.

By 2021 a series of "demake" Retro tables, and a series of Deluxe tables had been released. Like the Remake tables before, these were themed after the original Zaccaria tables, but with new layouts.

The first licensed tables were based on Postal Redux; a pack of four tables was released, one each of Retro, Solid State, Remake, and Deluxe. Further tables based on Postal 2 were released in 2022.

playfield and in-game UI of Time Machine pinball table

After a gap in releases for over two years, further Deluxe tables began to be released in January 2025, starting with Blackbelt Deluxe. By this time, the game included tables based on 40 physical Zaccaria tables. At the same time, the art on the older Deluxe tables, as well as on the Remakes, was overhauled, in some cases completely replacing the older placeholder artwork with AI-generated visuals. New Retro tables also were released, completing the roster so that each original table had a corresponding Retro.

Tables based on Primal Carnage were announced in 2024, but released on October 16, 2025.

After almost ten years as an early access game, the full release was on October 16, 2025. The total number of tables exceeded 140, including electro-mechanical and solid state Zaccaria designed tables, Retro tables using pre-1970 type designs, Remake tables based on 1980s solid state technology, and Deluxe tables using fully digital designs.

Four tables based on Blood West were released in December 2025. Tables in the EM+ (electro-mechanical+) category began to be released. Additional licensed tables based on Fallen Aces and Postal: Brain Damaged were also released. In March 2026, four tables based on Chernobylite were released, as well as further EM+ tables.

=== Other platforms ===
Versions were released for consoles with a limited number of tables. The Nintendo Switch version launched in July 2018, the Xbox One version launched in April 2019, and the PlayStation 4 version (North America region only) launched in August 2020.

== Reception ==
Reception

Review scores
Publication	Score
Digitally Downloaded	NS: 2.5/5
Switch Player	NS: 3/5
The VR Grid	PC(VR): 8/10

In 2018, Digitally Downloaded found it to have a huge range of customization options, more than competing games such as The Pinball Arcade and Pinball FX3. The physics were found to be accurate, but were disappointed that the game replicated "inferior" tables, none of which were based on licensed tables. The individual table prices were criticized. Switch Player appreciated the variety of ways each table could be played. The feature of showing the players real-time position on the global leaderboards while playing was praised. It was recommended to try the free tables first, as buying all tables in the game was found to be costly.

In 2019, a review of the VR capabilities of the Steam version by The VRGrid found the detail of the graphics to be "astonishing" and the physics caused the ball to behave naturally. The option for 3D spatial sound was appreciated. The reviewer would have preferred seeing in-game hands rather than seeing the controllers, and found the UI menu to be difficult to navigate.

For the full PC 1.0 release in 2025, James Cunningham found the various packs and pricing structures to make the over 140 tables in the collection manageable. That all tables are playable in VR was praised, but the use of AI tools to assist the game artists on some tables was criticized. The game was found to be an "incredible achievement" with numerous tables from various eras of pinball.

== AtGames ==
Some tables from Zaccaria Pinball were released for physical AtGames digital pinball machines beginning in 2021; these were sold in various packs.
