= Barracora =

1981 pinball machine

- rear of advertising flyer
- Manufacturer: Williams
- Release date: September 1981
- System: Williams System 7
- Model #: 510
- Players: 1-4
- Design: Roger Sharpe, Steve Epstein, Barry Oursler
- Programming: Ed Suchocki
- Artwork: Doug Watson
- Production run: 2,350

Barracora is a 1981 pinball machine released by Williams Electronics. It is based on the Williams System 7 design which debuted with the Black Knight game.

== Design ==
Barracora's backglass art was inspired by the artist H. R. Giger's 1974 painting Li I. Giger is known for his design in the science fiction horror movie Alien (1979). The face was derived from a young Brooke Shields. The image was created by Doug Watson with thirteen hand-drawn stippled layers created using a "double zero" rapidograph technical pen.

The figure of Barracora is shown on the playfield, along with more barracudas.

The game was designed by Roger Sharpe and Steve Epstein, with Barry Oursler creating the whitewood for the game. The game uses a single level playfield. The development process took over two years, during which time the first in a series of Williams double level games, Black Knight and Jungle Lord had been released. The success of a competing Bally game, Eight Ball Deluxe triggered the timing of the release of this game.

The game uses "intelligent target banks" with one coil lowering the whole target bank, and a reset coil for each individual target. The same technology is used in a few earlier Williams games such as Jungle Lord.

== Layout ==
Among the games elements are two banks of drop targets, including a three-target set (B, A, and RR) and a five-target set (A, C, O, R, A). The playfield is on a single level with no ramps, and was in development for two years. At the top of the machine are three rollovers labelled both 1-2-3 and 4-5-6. A lane on the left leads back to these rollovers. Towards the top of each side of the playfield is a kick-out saucer.

== Origin of the name ==
In an early role at Williams, pinball designer Larry DeMar assisted with this machine which was originally called "Las Vegas" with a roulette wheel, before it was rethemed as "Jet Orbit", then rethemed a second time to be released as Barracora.

The drawing for the backglass was called Barracuda, inspired by the song by Heart; and named for the two Barracuda heads. Williams executives disliked the name Barracuda, saying it had "negative connotations"; this may have been because the first two Jaws films had released relatively recently in 1975 and 1978. Doug Watson said he suggested the name Barracora. According to himself, Steve Kordek suggested the name when arguing over the name Barracuda.

Changing from 3+5 letters in the original names to nine letters in Barracora caused two 'R's to be placed on a single drop target.

Taito of Brazil copied the layout but used different artwork for Titan, a pinball machine released in 1982 or 1983.

== Gameplay ==
The right flipper changes the 1-2-3 rollover lights and at the same time the left flipper changes the 4-5-6 lights on the same rollovers but in the opposite direction. Completing each group of three lights advances scoring and can award the player an extra ball. Two targets advance a score value and its multiplier respectively with the value and multiplier shown with series of lights in the middle of the playfield, and collected by hitting the right saucer after lighting it by collecting all 1-6 rollover lights. Completing the drop targets each advance a bonus multiplier, and both of these multipliers are multiplied themselves for a maximum of 25X, and is the first Williams game with a "super bonus multiplier".

The game has a multiball which is started when a ball is locked into the left saucer; if the player locks a ball in the right saucer first then this is a three rather than two ball multiball.

For multiplayer games on factory settings the player with the highest score gets a bonus ball for 30 seconds, with a setting to allow operators to change the time awarded or disable the feature entirely.

== Reception ==
In a review for Play Meter, the name was confusing, but the backglass appreciated, awarding it 3/4.

Pinball Player found it to be a complicated and challenging game, suitable for skilled players.
