= Astro Invader =

Arcade shooter by Konami

- Arcade flyer
- Developer: Konami
- Publishers: JP: Leijac; NA: Stern Electronics
- Platforms: Arcade, Arcadia 2001
- Release: JP: 1979; NA: June 1980
- Genre: Fixed shooter
- Modes: Single-player, multiplayer

Astro Invader, originally released in Japan as Kamikaze (カミカゼ, Kamikaze) lit. Divine Wind, is a fixed shooter developed by Konami, and the first arcade video game published by Stern Electronics. A conversion of Astro Invader for the Emerson Arcadia 2001 was released in 1982.

== Gameplay ==
Screenshot

The player controls a small spaceship at the bottom of the screen. Like most Space Invaders-type games of the period, the ship can move left and right (but not up or down), and can fire one bullet at a time. The ship may not fire again until its previous shot has hit by alien or small flying saucer or on top portion of wide column or playfield.

The playfield above the player's ship contains 13 (in the Japanese version, 15) columns. Three of them, on the far left, far right, and in the center, are wide columns (in the Japanese version, one in the center is a wide column). The other 10 (in the Japanese version, 14), five (in the Japanese version, seven) on either side of the center, are much narrower. At the beginning of each wave, a large flying saucer enters at the top of the screen and begins dropping small aliens into the ten (in the Japanese version, fourteen) narrow columns. The columns are open on the bottom, allowing the player to shoot the aliens as they descend. Each narrow column (in the Japanese version, excluding the leftmost and rightmost columns) holds a maximum of four aliens. If a column is full, the next alien dropped into it will release the bottommost alien, which falls straight down. In the Japanese version, aliens fall straight down immediately on the leftmost and rightmost columns. If the alien reaches the bottom of the screen without being shot by the player, it explodes - the explosion extends slightly to each side of the alien. Collision with a falling alien or its explosion destroys the player's ship. The small aliens are worth 20 points when moving (falling into or out of a column), and 10 points at rest. Aliens remain in their columns until shot or released; any aliens at rest in a column, either at the end of a wave or when the player's ship is destroyed, are still there when play resumes.

At regular intervals, a small flying saucer descends from one of the three wide columns (in the Japanese version, from the wide column only). Unlike the small aliens, the small flying saucer must be completely killed. If it is allowed to reach the bottom of the screen, the player's ship is immediately destroyed. Small flying saucers are worth anywhere from 100 to 400 (in the Japanese version, 800) points.

A counter on the large flying saucer tells the player how many aliens it has left to drop for that wave. The large flying saucer carries 200 (in the Japanese version, 100) aliens. When its counter reaches 000, the wave is over and player's ship and its bullets and all aliens and the descending small flying saucer pause at that point, and the large flying saucer flies away. A new large flying saucer carrying next set of aliens then flies in to take its place and begins the next wave. When the new large flying saucer reaches the top-center, the game unpauses and everything resumes exactly as it was before its gameplay was paused, with the new large flying saucer continuing the job of dropping aliens.

== Development ==
Stern Electronics bought the worldwide (excluding Japan) license for Astro Invader. Logic boards were procured from Japan, with the remainder of the machine produced at Stern's factory in Chicago. The first sample machine was completed five weeks after the contract was signed. As the first arcade video game produced by Stern, it used some components already in use in pinball machines.
