= Sengoku Ninja Tai =

1980 video game

- Developer: Data East
- Publisher: Data East
- Platform: Arcade
- Release: December 1980
- Genre: Action
- Mode: Two players alternating turns
- Arcade system: DECO Cassette System

Sengoku Ninja Tai (戦国忍者隊, Japanese: The Sengoku's Greatest Ninja) is an arcade video game released by Data East in December 1980. Also known as Ninja, Sengoku Ninja Tai was the second game released for the DECO Cassette System, following Highway Chase, also released in December 1980. The objective of the game is to shoot ninjas before they reach the top of a castle.
