= Mata Hari (pinball) =

1978 pinball machine

- Manufacturer: Bally Manufacturing
- Release date: April 1978
- Model #: 1104
- Players: 4
- Design: Jim Patla
- Artwork: Dave Christensen
- Production run: 16,260 (solid-state) 170 (EM)

Mata Hari is a pinball machine created by Bally Manufacturing in 1977 and released in 1978. The theme of the game is based on Dutch exotic dancer, Mata Hari. It was mainly produced using solid-state electronics but also 170 electro-mechanical versions were released. It was the last model manufactured by Bally in two such versions. Approximately 20 sample games were produced with a plastic playfield, instead of the traditional wooden playfield.

== Design ==
The artwork was designed by Dave Christensen, with Bally's sales manager calling the playfield glamorous. The design noticeably consists of mainly dark, red and gold color artwork and a prominent image of a dagger running up the middle. A dagger is also depicted on the backglass in the hand of Mata Hari. One version is blank and one shows an inscription with the motto of the Nazi German SS "Meine Ehre heißt Treue" (German, "My honor is loyalty"). Mata Hari died during World War I therefore the inscription is an anachronism. Approximately 4,500 machines were produced with the inscription, including the 170 EM machines. A portrait of the girlfriend of the artist was used to create the depiction of Mata Hari on the backglass. She is shown holding a map of the Battle of Caporetto.

The game has chimes as it was designed before electronic sounds were used. The table features two flippers, four pop bumpers, two slingshots, two four-bank drop targets and one kick-out hole. The machines makes use of a MPU 2518-17 circuit and an AS2518-18 power supply.

The game was initially called Bank Shot during development, due to the player being able to hit a drop target on each of the target banks with a single shot.

== Gameplay ==
The game allows up to four players. The table has a completely symmetric playfield layout. The machine has a simple straight-forward rule set that offers a challenge to beginners and advanced players with three goals to accomplish: knock down the drop targets, complete the A-B combination a certain number of times and land in the kickout hole multiple times. The rules in detail are the following: Making ‘A’ and ‘B’ top rollover lanes or left and right ‘A’ and ‘B’ orbits scores and advances ‘A-B’ lit value which is displayed in the centre of the playfield. Landing the ball in the top kickout hole first time scores 3K points, advances bonus value 3 places, lights 2x bonus multiplier and lights left outlane for 50K points. Second time lights right outlane for 50K points and 3x bonus multiplier. Third time lights 5x bonus multiplier. Knocking down all drop targets scores 50K points and lights target special light. A replay is available for making ‘A’ and ‘B’ when lit for special and another +50K for all target down when lit for special.

== Reception ==
In a review for Play Meter Roger Sharpe awarded the game 3.5/4 calling the graphics outstanding and "another milestone in pinball art".

== Similar games ==
Taito of Brazil copied Mata Hari to create two very similar games, Lady Luck, and Vegas. Lady Luck uses a similar colour palette to the original, with the backglass of Vegas using a brighter palette.
