= Disco No. 1 =

1982 video game

- Arcade flyer
- Developer: Data East
- Publisher: Data East
- Platform: Arcade
- Release: NA: 1982
- Genre: Action
- Modes: Single-player, multiplayer

Disco No. 1 (also released as Sweet Heart) is an arcade video game released in 1982 by Data East. The game was available on DECO Cassette System and conventional versions.

== Plot ==
The player plays as a 90-pound weakling kid in a roller rink who has to skate around the bad guys in order to win the attention of pretty girls. Earn points by completely encircling one or more tough guys and picking up various bonus items that float across the rink.

== Legacy ==
Disco No. 1 was cloned as Thin Ice for the Intellivision console.
