= Video game conversion =

Changing a game to run on a different device

In video gaming parlance, a conversion is the production of a game on one computer or console that was originally written for another system. The general software term for this is porting. Over the years, video game conversion has taken form in a number of different ways, both in their style and the method in which they were converted.

In the arcade video game industry, the term conversion has a different meaning, referring to game conversion kits for arcade cabinets.

== Types of conversions ==
=== Direct conversions ===
Direct conversions, also referred to as "straight conversions", are conversions in which the source code of the original game is used with relatively few modifications. Direct conversions were fairly rare until the second half of the 1990s. In the case of arcade conversions, this was because arcade systems were usually much more advanced than their contemporary home-based systems, which thus could not accurately recreate the speed, graphics, audio, and in some cases even the gameplay algorithms of arcade games. In the case of personal computer conversions, most games pre-1995 were produced in assembly language, and source-based conversions could not be reproduced on systems with other processors, rendering the original source code useless. Also, while most third-party developers had access to the original graphics and audio, they could not be faithfully reproduced on older home computers such as the ZX Spectrum and developers were forced to recreate the graphics and audio from scratch.

In the early 2000s, source-based conversions of games became more feasible and one-to-one pixel perfect conversions became commonplace.

=== Imitations/clones ===
Imitations of popular arcade games were common, particularly in the early days of video gaming when copyright violations were treated less severely. While the game was fundamentally the same, the title, names, graphics and audio were usually changed to avoid legal challenges.

Developers have created "clones" of their own games. Escape (later known as Westone) produced a clone of Wonder Boy for the NES by the name of Adventure Island to circumnavigate a number of legal issues surrounding the Wonder Boy name and character.

=== Remakes ===
Developers have remade older video games with modern technology. This was a particular phenomenon during the late 1990s with numerous 3D updates of games such as Frogger, Missile Command, Asteroids and Space Invaders.

=== Retro/emulation ===
Advances in technology and a rising interest in retro gaming have incited a trend whereby collections of "classic" games, usually arcade games, are re-released on modern gaming systems in their original forms. This is usually carried out by means of custom emulators, which reproduce the activity of the original arcade ROMs. In other words, instead of rewriting the code for the game itself onto the new hardware system, the programmers write code which imitates the original hardware system and transfer the game code without alteration.

Nintendo's Game Boy Advance has had hundreds of conversions of older games, including games originally written for the SNES, whose hardware bears some similarities to the Game Boy Advance.

== Conversion kit ==
A conversion kit, also known as a software kit, is special equipment that can be installed into an arcade cabinet that changes the current arcade video game it plays into another one. For example, a conversion kit can be used to reconfigure an arcade machine designed to play one game so that it would play its sequel or update instead, such as from Street Fighter II: Champion Edition to Street Fighter II Turbo.

A conversion kit can be sold in the form of a printed circuit board (PCB) for a compatible arcade system (such as the Sega Model systems), or a ROM cartridge for a multi-game arcade system (such as the Neo Geo).

== History ==
The earliest video game conversions were almost exclusively home versions of popular arcade games. The first examples were conversions of Atari's Pong in the form of consoles with this one game built-in, as well as consoles that included a number of variations on the game. Atari produced their own "official" conversion of the game for home use, but a number of other imitators such as Sears' Telegames Pong IV were also on the market.

With the beginning of the video game era, Atari released their Atari 2600 console for which they licensed and produced a number of home conversions of popular arcade titles, including Pac-Man by Namco, Space Invaders and Defender. Later, other third-party developers and publishers such as Activision and Coleco produced games like Donkey Kong for the Atari 2600.

Data East introduced the concept of a convertible arcade system board, or arcade conversion system, with the DECO Cassette System. It was the first interchangeable arcade system, developed in 1979 before it was released in 1980. It inspired Sega's Convert-a-Game system, which was released in 1981. Mr. Do! (1982) by Universal was the first hit arcade game sold as a conversion kit. After the golden age of arcade video games came to an end circa 1983, the arcade video game industry began recovering circa 1985 with the arrival of software conversion kit systems, such as Sega's Convert-a-Game system, the Atari System 1, and the Nintendo VS. System, the latter being the Western world's introduction to the Nintendo Entertainment System (NES) hardware in 1984, prior to the official release of the NES console; the success of the VS. System in arcades was instrumental to the release and success of the NES in North America.
