= Astro Fantasia =

1981 video game

- Flyer
- Developer: Data East
- Publisher: Data East
- Platform: Arcade
- Release: NA: March 1981
- Genre: Fixed shooter
- Modes: Single-player, multiplayer
- Arcade system: DECO Cassette System (32K)

Astro Fantasia is a fixed shooter arcade video game released by Data East in 1981.

== Gameplay ==
The player pilots a single spaceship against an armada of enemies.

There are two different screens that alternate:

Wave 1 uses pseudo 3D graphics and has a large red bit of what appears to be part of a very large spaceship as background on the bottom half of the screen. Players can move their ship around anywhere on the red background, but the black area beyond is off limits. The game opens with a large mothership craft visible at the top of the screen, but shots cannot reach it at this point. Red aliens quickly begin attacking, swooping in line formations from the top area of the screen. They scale in size as they get closer. After the armada is gone, the mothership begins spewing out groups of red aliens, and a new green ship that fires at the player. Eventually the mothership will stop spewing fighters and the entire screen will scroll up, and the game will begin the second wave.

Wave 2 pits the player against the mothership directly. Multi shot is gone, and players can only have one shot on the screen at a time. The mothership has three areas that must be blasted away.
