= Super Doubles Tennis =

1983 video game

- Super Doubles Tennis screenshot
- Developer(s): Data East
- Publisher(s): Data East
- Platform(s): Arcade
- Release: 1983
- Genre(s): Sports
- Mode(s): Multiplayer

Super Doubles Tennis is an arcade game released by Data East in 1983.

== Gameplay ==
The game puts four players on a tennis match - two humans and two computer -controlled players. If one player decides to play without company, the computer takes the role of the player's partner.

== Reception ==
In Japan, Game Machine listed Super Doubles Tennis on their November 1, 1983 issue as being the fourth most-successful new table arcade unit of the month.
