= Treasure Island (1981 video game) =

1981 video game

- Arcade flyer
- Publishers: Data East; Texas Instruments (TI-99)
- Platforms: Arcade, TI-99/4A
- Release: Arcade: JP: September 30, 1981; NA: June 1982; TI-99/4A; 1984
- Genres: Maze
- Modes: Single-player, multiplayer
- Arcade system: DECO Cassette System

Treasure Island is an arcade video game released by Data East in Japan in 1981, then North America in 1982. It was available for the DECO Cassette System as well as a standalone cabinet. Treasure Island is a vertically scrolling game with isometric graphics. The goal is to climb a sinking island while gathering treasure.

A port for the TI-99/4A was published by Texas Instruments in 1984.

== See also ==
- Zaxxon
- Congo Bongo
