= Eyes (video game) =

1982 video game

- Developer: Digitrex Techstar
- Publishers: Rock-Ola; Zaccaria (Europe)
- Designer: Luis Sanchez
- Platform: Arcade
- Release: 1982
- Genre: Maze
- Modes: Single-player, multiplayer
- Arcade system: Namco Pac-Man

Eyes is a maze shooter arcade video game created by Miami-based developer Digitrex Techstar and published in 1982 by Rock-Ola. It was licensed for the European market by Zaccaria with different cabinet art.

== Gameplay ==
The start of a new game. The eyeball closest to the top of the screen is the player's.

The player controls an eyeball in a maze. As in Pac-Man the goal is to collect all of the dots to advance to next level, but in Eyes the player shoots the dots rather than eating them. Computer-controlled eyes chase and shoot at the player. Shooting a computer eye gives points and removes it from the level, but it will reappear a short time later. Being shot by a computer eye is fatal.

As the game progresses, more computer eyes are added to levels and they take less time to shoot at the player. They also move faster. There are eight different mazes.

== See also ==
- Nibbler, a Rock-Ola game with similar visual elements
