= Arcadia 2001 =

1982 home video game console

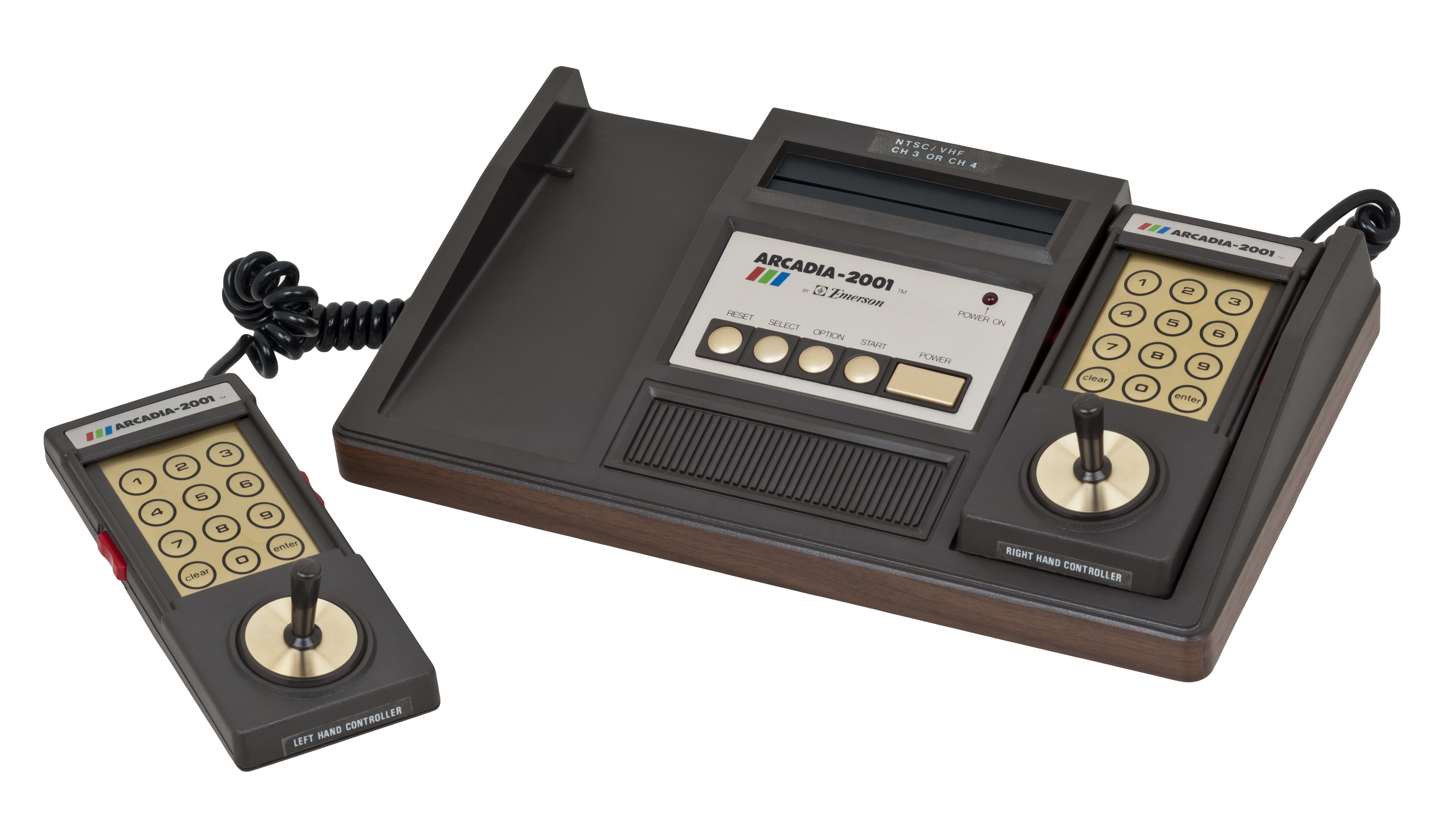
- An Arcadia 2001
- Also known as: MPT-03/Video Computer Game
- Manufacturer: Emerson Radio
- Type: Home video game console
- Generation: Second generation
- Released: May 1982; 44 years ago
- Lifespan: 18 months
- Introductory price: US$99 (equivalent to $341.24 in March 2026)
- Discontinued: 1984
- Units sold: 20,000-30,000 (est.)
- Media: ROM cartridge
- CPU: Signetics 2650
- Memory: 1 KB RAM
- Display: TV; 128 × 208 / 128 × 104, 8 Colours
- Graphics: Signetics 2637 UVI
- Sound: 2 channels (Beeper and Noise)
- Input: Controllers
- Controller input: 2 x Intellivision-style controller (12 button keypad and 'fire' buttons on the sides)
- Power: 12 volt
- Best-selling game: Unknown
- Predecessor: None
- Successor: None

The Arcadia 2001 is a second-generation 8-bit home video game console released by Emerson Radio in May 1982 for a price of US$99, several months before the release of ColecoVision. It was discontinued only 18 months later, with a total of 35 games having been released. Emerson licensed the Arcadia 2001 to Bandai, which released it in Japan. Over 30 Arcadia 2001 clones exist despite the system being a commercial failure.

== Description ==
The Arcadia is much smaller than its contemporary competitors and is powered by a standard 12 volt power supply so it can be used in a boat or a vehicle. It has two headphone jacks on the far left and right sides of the back.

The system came with two Intellivision-style controllers with a 12-button keypad and "fire" buttons on the sides. The direction pads have a removable joystick attachment. Most games came with BoPET overlays that can be applied to the controller's keypads. The console itself has five buttons: Power, Start, Reset, Option, and Select.

There are at least three different cartridge case styles and artwork, with variations on each. Emerson-family cartridges come in two different lengths (short and long) of black plastic cases.

== Technical specifications ==
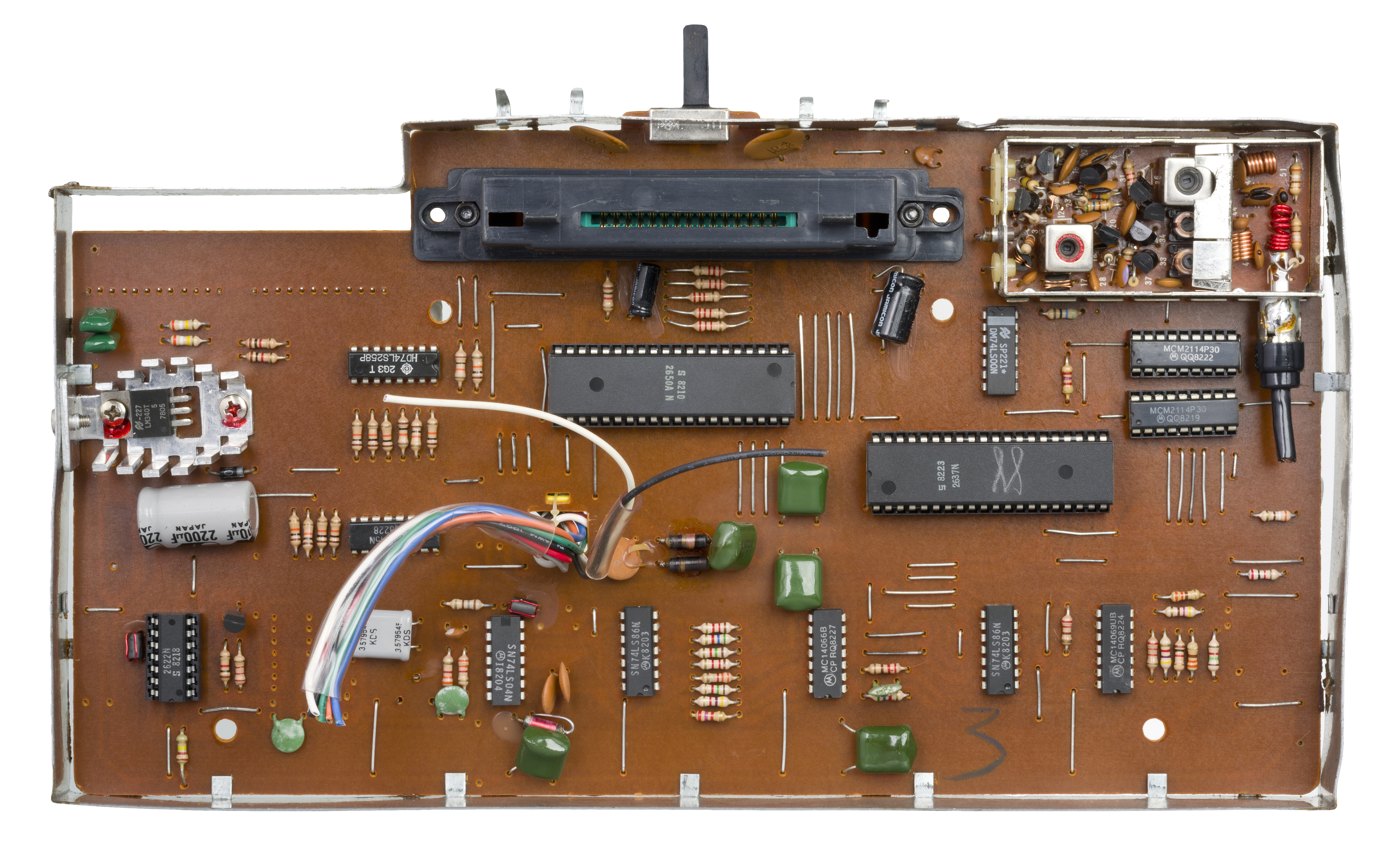
Arcadia 2001 motherboard

- Main Processor: Signetics 2650 CPU (some variants run a Signetics 2650A)
- RAM: 1 KB
- ROM: None
- Video display: 128 × 208 / 128 × 104, 8 Colours
- Video display controller: Signetics 2637 UVI @ 3.58 MHz (NTSC), 3.55 MHz (PAL)
- Sound: Single Channel "Beeper" + Single Channel "Noise"
- Hardware Sprites: 4 independent, single color
- Controllers: 2 × 2 way
- Keypads: 2 × 12 button (more buttons on some variants)

== Console variants and clones ==
Many variants and clones of the Arcadia 2001 have been released by various companies in different countries. These systems are mostly compatible with each other. In 1982, the Bandai Arcadia was released only in Japan, and licensed by Emerson. Four exclusive games were released for the system.

Name	Manufacturer	Country	Compatibility family	Image
Advision Home Arcade	Advision	(France)	Emerson console	
2001 ALTOS Home Video Centre	Altos India Limited	(India)	Emerson console	2001 ALTOS
Arcadia	Bandai	(Japan)	Emerson console	Bandai Arcadia 2001
Arcadia 2001	Emerson	(United States)	Emerson console	
Cosmos	Tele-Computer	(Spain)	Emerson console	
Dynavision	Morning-Sun Commerce	(Japan)	MPT-03 console	
Educat	unknown	(Israel)	MPT-03 console	
Ekusera	P.I.C.	(Japan)	MPT-03 console	
Hanimex MPT-03	Hanimex	(France)	MPT-03 console	
HMG-2650	Hanimex	(Germany) (Canada) (Australia)	Emerson console	
Home Arcade Centre	Hanimex	(United Kingdom)	Emerson console	
Intelligent Game MPT-03	Intelligent Game	(United States) (Canada)	MPT-03 console	
Intercord XL 2000 System	Intercord	(Germany)	Emerson console	
Intervision 2001	Intervision	(Switzerland) (Finland)	Ormatu console	
ITMC MPT-03	ITMC	(France)	MPT-03 console	
Leisure Vision	Leisure-Dynamics	(Canada)	Emerson console	
Leonardo	GiG Electronics	(Italy)	Emerson console	
Home Entertainment Centre Ch-50	Inno-Hit	(Italy)	Ormatu console	
Ormatu 2001	Ormatu Electronics BV	(Netherlands)	Ormatu console	
Palladium Video-Computer-Game	Neckermann	(Germany)	Palladium console	
Polybrain Video Computer Game	Polybrain	(Germany)	Palladium console	
Poppy MPT-03 Tele Computer Spiel	Poppy	(Germany)	MPT-03 console	
Prestige Video Computer Game MPT-03	Prestige	(France)	MPT-03 console	
Robdajet MPT-03	Robdajet	(Switzerland)	MPT-03 console	
Rowtron 2000	Rowtron	(United Kingdom)	MPT-03 console	
Schmid TVG-2000	Schmid	(Germany)	Emerson console	
Sheen Home Video Centre 2001	Sheen	(Australia)	Ormatu console	
Soundic MPT-03	Soundic	(Finland) (Singapore)	MPT-03 console	
Tedelex Home Arcade	Tedelex	(South Africa)	Emerson console	
Mr. Altus Das Tele-Gehirn Color (German for tele brain)	HGS Electronic	(Germany)	Palladium console	
Tele-Fever	Tchibo	(Germany)	Emerson console	
Tempest MPT-03	Tempest	(Australia)	MPT-03 console	
Tobby MPT-03	Tobby	?	MPT-03 console	
Trakton Computer Video Game	Trakton	(Australia)	Palladium console	
Tryom Video Game Center	Tryom	(United States)	MPT-03 console	
Tunix Home Arcade	Monaco Leisure	(New Zealand)	Emerson console	
UVI Compu-Game	Orbit Electronics	(New Zealand)	Orbit console	
Video Master	Grandstand	(New Zealand)	Orbit console	

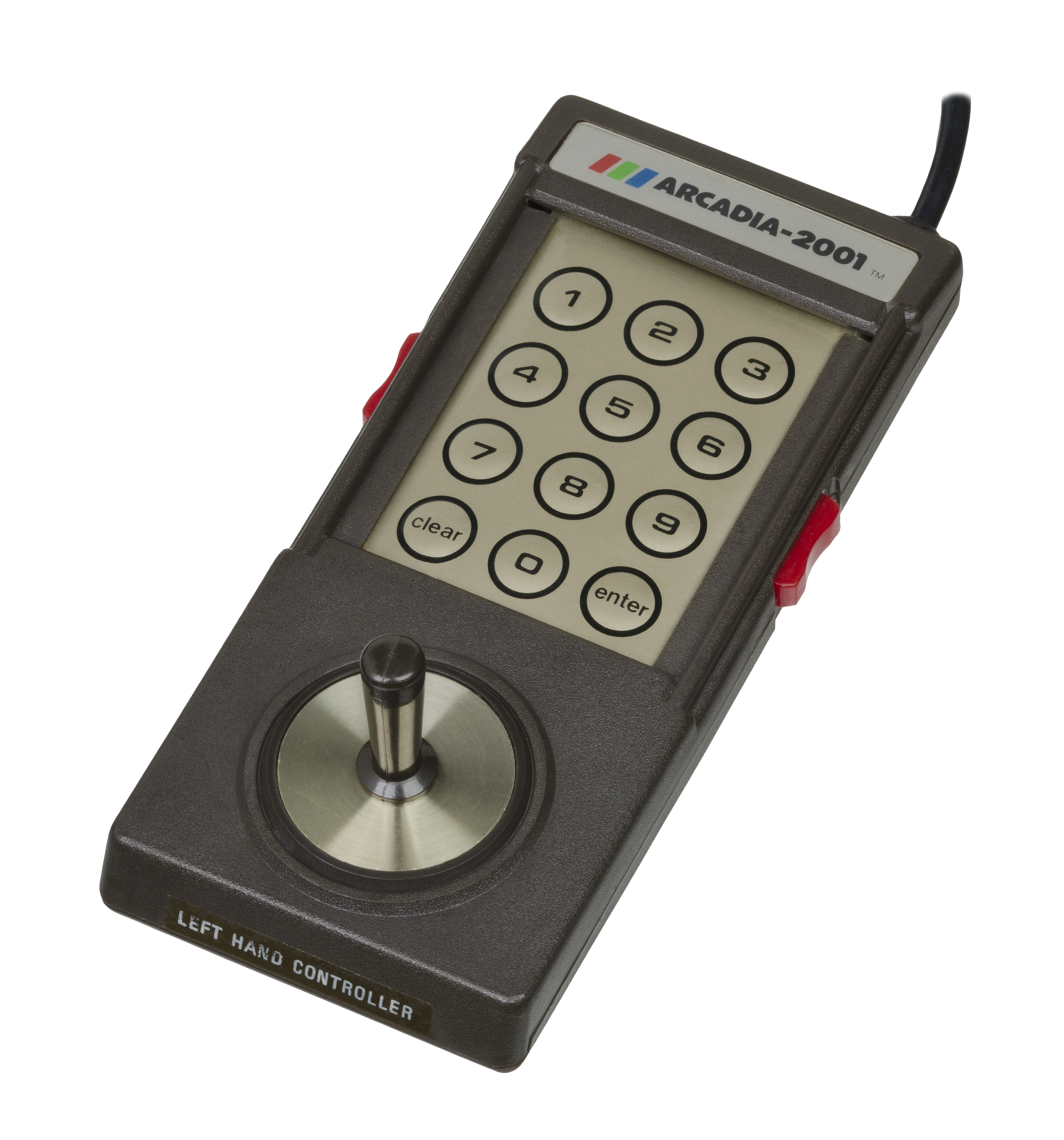
The Arcadia 2001's bundled controller, a pad {hole in the center to screw a joystick} and a keypad of 12 buttons

=== Bandai Arcadia ===
Arcadia 2001
- Manufacturer: Bandai
- Type: Video game console
- Generation: Second generation
- Released: 1982
- Media: ROM cartridge
- CPU: Signetics 2650 @ 3.58 MHz
- Predecessor: Bandai Super Vision 8000
- Successor: Bandai RX-78

In 1982, the Bandai Arcadia, a variant of the Emerson Arcadia 2001, was licensed and distributed to Japan by Bandai for a price of 19,800 yen.

== Reception ==
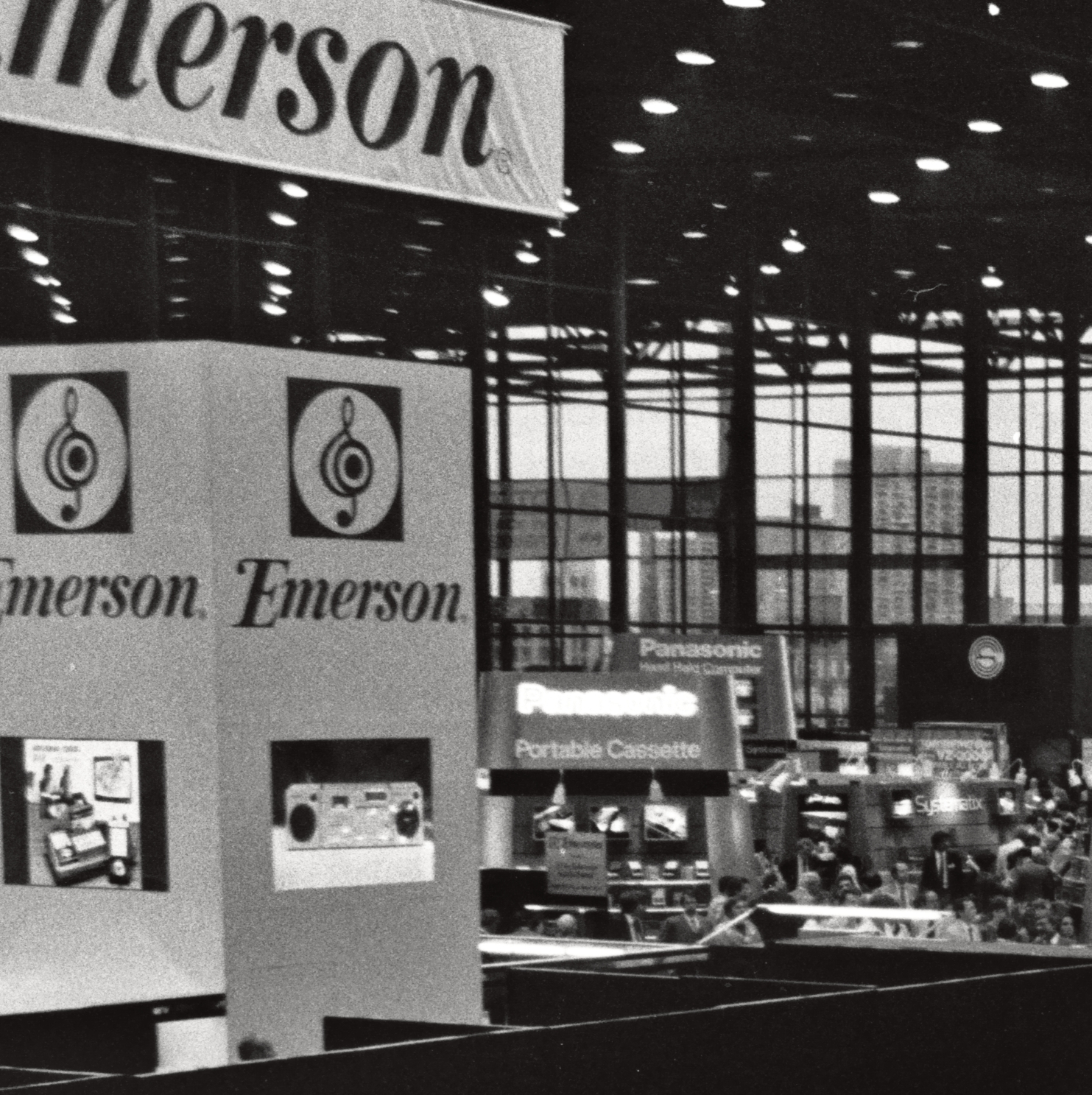
The Emerson Booth at CES 1982, featuring their Arcadia 2001 system

After seeing the Arcadia 2001 at the summer 1982 Consumer Electronics Show, Danny Goodman of Creative Computing Video & Arcade Games reported that its graphics were similar to the Atari 2600's, and that "our overall impression of the game play was favorable for a system in this price range, though no cartridge stands out as being an exciting original creation". He called the controller offering both Intellivision-like disc and joystick functionality "A great idea".

== Games ==
Emerson planned to launch the console with 19 games. Some Arcadia 2001 games are ports of lesser-known arcade games such as Route 16, Jungler, and Jump Bug, which were not available on other home systems.

Emerson actually created many popular arcade titles including Pac-Man, Galaxian and Defender for the Arcadia, but never had them manufactured as Atari started to sue its competitor companies for releasing games to which it had exclusive-rights agreements. Early marketing showed popular arcade games, but they were later released as clones. For instance, the Arcadia 2001 game Space Raiders is a clone of Defender, and Breakaway is a clone of Breakout.

=== Released games ===
There are 55 games known to have been released for the Arcadia 2001 and its clones during the system's lifetime.

1. 3D Attack – a Zaxxon clone
2. 3D Bowling (1982)
3. 3D Soccer (1982)
4. Alien Invaders (1982)
5. American Football
6. Astro Invader
7. Auto Race
8. Baseball
9. Basketball
10. Battle
11. Blackjack/Poker
12. Boxing
13. Brain Quiz – AKA Math/Logic
14. Breakaway
15. Capture – a clone of the board game Othello
16. Cat Trax
17. Circus – also known as Clowns on some systems, clone of Exidy's Circus
18. Combat
19. Crazy Climber
20. Crazy Gobbler
21. Dictionary – English/German
22. Doraemon (Japan only)
23. Dr. Slump (Japan only)
24. Escape
25. Funky Fish
26. Golf
27. Grand Slam Tennis
28. Hobo
29. Horse Racing (plays similar to the Intellivision game)
30. Jump Bug
31. Jungler
32. Missile War
33. Mobile Suit Gundam (Japan only)
34. Monaco Grand Prix – AKA 3D Raceway
35. Nibblemen – AKA Super Gobbler and Devilman the Dot Muncher
36. Ocean Battle – AKA Sea Battle
37. Parashooter
38. Pleiades
39. R2D Tank
40. Red Clash
41. Robot Killer (clone of Berzerk)
42. Route-16
43. Soccer
44. Space Attack
45. Space Mission
46. Space Raiders
47. Space Squadron
48. Space Vultures
49. Spiders
50. Star Chess – AKA Video Chess
51. Super Dimension Fortress Macross (Japan only)
52. Super Bug
53. Tanks A Lot
54. The End
55. Turtles/Turpin

=== Homebrew games ===
Three hobbyist-developed games are known to have been made for the system:

- Frogger
- JTron
- Tetris
