= Fantasy (video game) =

1981 video game

- Title screen
- Developer: SNK
- Publishers: JP/EU: SNK; NA: Rock-Ola
- Platform: Arcade
- Release: JP: October 1981; EU: 1981; NA: February 1982
- Genre: Action
- Mode: Single-player
- Arcade system: SNK 6502 / SNK Rockola

Fantasy is an action game developed by SNK and released for arcades in October 1981. It was licensed to Rock-Ola for North American release in February 1982. The game is controlled with a single joystick. One level plays the melody from the song "Funkytown". According to the book Gamers: Writers, Artists & Programmers on the Pleasures of Pixels, this is the first arcade video game to have a continue feature.

The game runs on the SNK 6502 arcade system board, also known as the SNK Rockola hardware. Other games that run on the same hardware are Sasuke vs. Commander (1980), Zarzon (1981) and Vanguard (1981).
