= Jump Bug =

1981 video games

- North American arcade flyer
- Developers: Hoei Corporation; Alpha Denshi
- Publishers: JP/EU: Sega; NA: Rock-Ola
- Platforms: Arcade, Arcadia 2001, PC-98
- Release: WW: December 1981
- Genres: Scrolling shooter, platform
- Modes: Single-player, multiplayer
- Arcade system: Namco Galaxian

Jump Bug (Note: Japanese: ジャンプバグ, Hepburn: Janpu Bagu) is a 1981 scrolling shooter platform game developed by Alpha Denshi under contract for Hoei Corporation. It was distributed in arcades by Sega in Japan and Europe, and by Rock-Ola in North America. The player controls a bouncing car (or "bug") in a forced scrolling world. The car can eliminate enemies by shooting them and collect money bags by landing on them. The world is divided into several themed areas that are seamlessly connected. Jump Bug was ported to the Arcadia 2001, Leisure Vision, and PC-98 home systems.

Jump Bug is one of the first forced scrolling horizontal shooters, following the chain of games just like Scramble and Super Cobra from earlier in 1981. It is the first game in the nascent platformer genre to include horizontal and, in one segment, vertical scrolling. It uses a limited form of parallax scrolling, with the main scene scrolling while starry night sky is fixed and clouds move slowly, adding depth to the scenery. This was a year before Moon Patrol (1982), with its three moving layers.

== Gameplay ==
The player controls a constantly bouncing car resembling a Volkswagen Beetle (which acquired the nickname "bug"). It drives through a city, mountains, a large pyramid, and a body of water with islands where the car is mostly underwater and moves more slowly. The height of a jump and speed of a fall are controlled with the joystick. The player can shoot various enemies that appear. Points are gained by collecting treasure, killing enemies, and jumping on clouds. Each treasure adds to a meter, which grants an extra life the first time it is filled.

The game smoothly scrolls as the player's car moves to the right, but in the pyramid segment the game also scrolls vertically in a coarser manner. Here the player is able to move in any direction, including to the left, while looking for the exit.

== Reception ==
In Japan, Jump Bug was tied with Scramble and Space Panic as the 14th highest-grossing 1981 game.
