= Flight 2000 (pinball) =

1980 pinball machine

- Manufacturer: Stern
- Release date: October 1980
- Design: Harry Williams
- Programming: Bill Pfutzenreuter
- Artwork: Gerry Simkus, Doug Watson
- Production run: 6,300

Flight 2000 is a 1980 Stern widebody pinball machine. It was the first table by Stern with speech. The theme of the game revolves around futuristic space flight.

== Description ==
The game has 3-ball multiball where each ball is launched through three separate 'Lift-Off' stages. This is placed at the upper left of the playfield inside a maze-like ball lock mechanism.

The playfield contains a ball capture feature in the upper left and a spinner and drop targets in the middle. Space ships heading to the stars are depicted on the backbox.

Flight 2000 has a robotic synthesized speech sound that fits well to its space travel theme; the voice is the same one that was used in Stern's own Berzerk. Pinball machines with speech were still uncommon in 1980. Xenon was not released by Bally until a couple of months later.

The pinball machine was well received for its combination of attractive art and Harry Williams design work. Flight 2000 sold well and has a cult following among Stern fans. In Japan, Game Machine listed Flight 2000 on their June 1, 1983 issue as being the third most-successful flipper unit of the month.

== Digital versions ==
Flight 2000 was the winner of a fan poll as the classic Stern table and released as a licensed table on The Pinball Arcade on several platforms.
