= Crazy Kong =

1981 video game

- Developer: Falcon
- Publisher: Falcon
- Series: Donkey Kong (unofficially)
- Platform: Arcade
- Release: 1981
- Genre: Platform
- Modes: Up to 2 players, alternating turns

Crazy Kong (クレイジーコング, Kureijī Kongu) is an arcade video game developed by Falcon, released in 1981 and similar to Nintendo's Donkey Kong. Although commonly believed to be a bootleg version, it was officially licensed for operation only in Japan when Nintendo could not keep up with domestic demand (even though Donkey Kong was still released there), and is based on different hardware. It retains all the gameplay elements of Donkey Kong, but its graphics were redrawn and re-colorized. Falcon breached their contract by exporting the cabinets overseas, leading Nintendo to revoke the license in January 1982. Like the original game, Crazy Kong had bootleg versions under such titles as Congorilla, Big Kong, Donkey King and Monkey Donkey.

There are two versions of the original: Crazy Kong and Crazy Kong Part II. The differences between them are in minor cinematic artifacts and bugs, color palette choices and minor gameplay differences; the first part then shows no copyright or company name on the title screen. Crazy Kong Part II also features an opening scene produced by Falcon where Donkey Kong breaks out of a cage. This notably impressed Shigeru Miyamoto at the time. Both run on modified Crazy Climber hardware; there are other versions that run on Scramble, Jeutel, Orca, and Alca hardware. The official Crazy Kong came in two stand-up cabinets featuring a large and angry (rather than comic) ape; they were manufactured by Zaccaria (also Italian distributor of the game).

As Nintendo released Donkey Kong Jr. (a Donkey Kong sequel), Falcon developed and published a cloned-sequel as well entitled Crazy Kong Jr, also known as Crazy Junior, but unlike the previous one, it was unlicensed by both Nintendo and Nintendo of America.
