= Bandai Super Vision 8000 =

1979 video game console

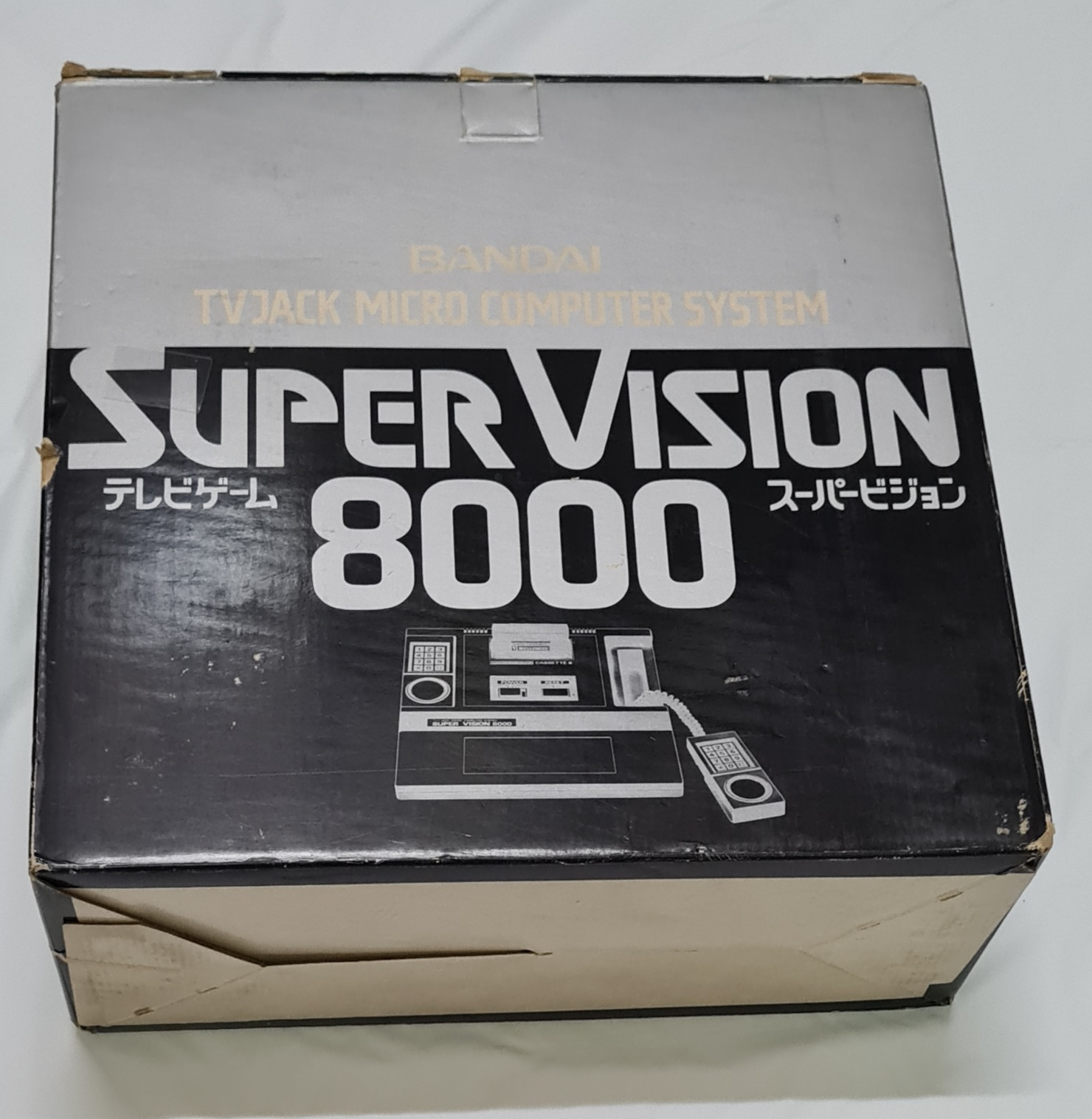
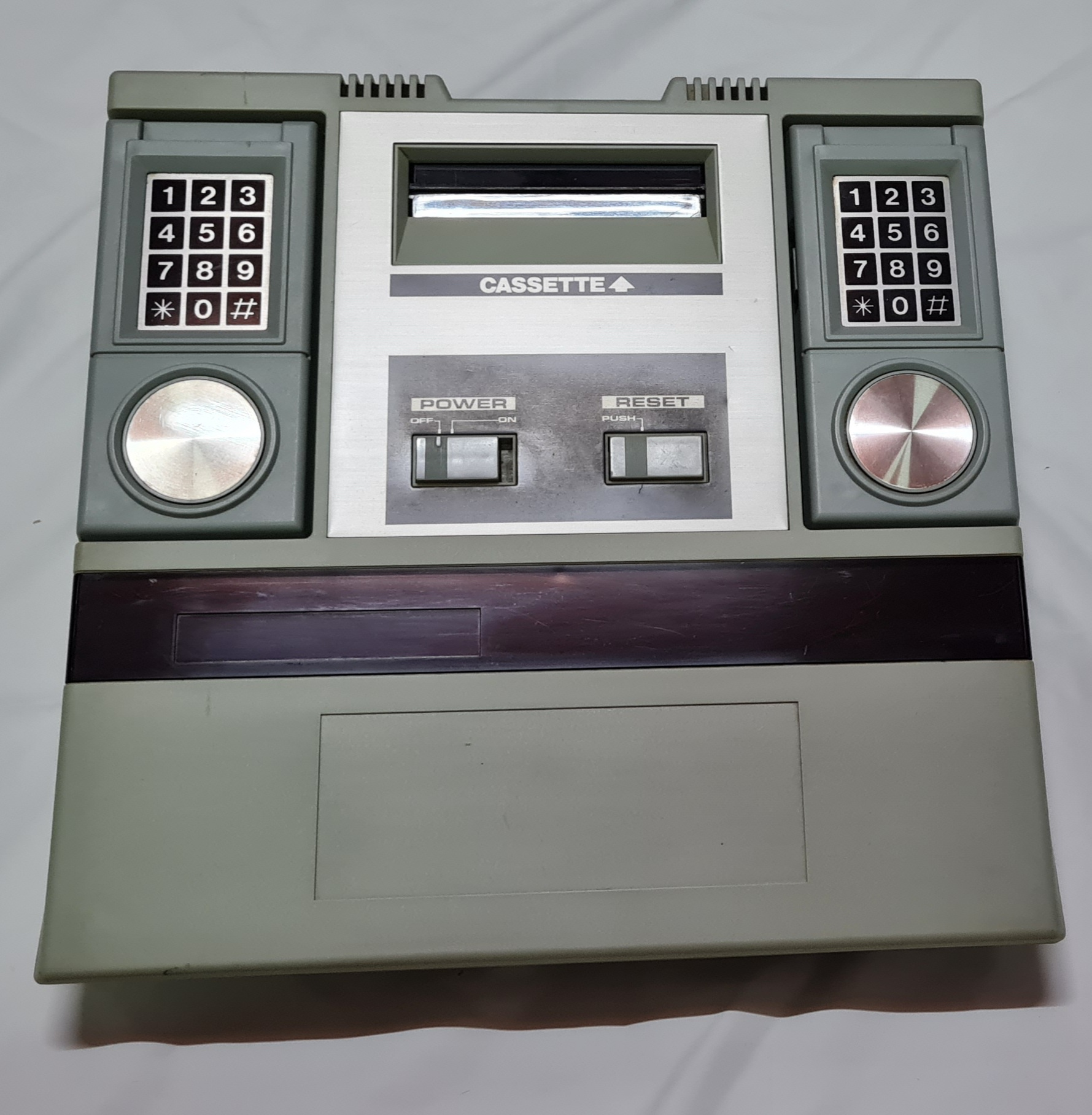
- Manufacturer: Bandai
- Type: Home video game console
- Generation: Second generation
- Released: December 1979; 46 years ago
- Introductory price: 59,800 Yen (Japan)
- Discontinued: 1982
- Media: ROM cartridge
- CPU: NEC D780C-1 @ 3.58 MHz
- Display: TV, 256x192
- Graphics: Ami S68047 (Motorola 6847 clone)
- Sound: AY-3-8910
- Predecessor: Bandai TV Jack 5000
- Successor: Bandai Arcadia

The Bandai Super Vision 8000, also known as the TV Jack 8000, is a home video game console released by Bandai in 1979 belonging to the second generation. The console can be directly connected to a TV.

This console was the last of the Bandai TV Jack console series but was completely different from the other consoles of the series. The Super Vision 8000 had a central CPU. The other consoles belonged to the first generation: they did not feature a microprocessor, and were based on custom codeless state machine computers consisting of discrete logic circuits comprising each element of the game itself (Pong-style console).

== Technical specifications ==
- CPU: 8-bit NEC D780C-1 (Z80 clone), running at 3.58 MHz
- Resolution: 256 pixel x 192 with 2 Colors (32 x 16 character mode using built-in 8x12 font), 128 x 192 Bitmap Mode with 2 Colors, 128 x 96 Bitmap Mode with 4 Colors
- Memory: 1 KB RAM, 3 KB VRAM
- VDG: Ami S68047 (Motorola 6847 clone)
- Audio: General Instrument AY-3-8910, three channel sound, with one noise generator
- Introductory price: 59,800 yen (Japan)

== Games ==
All seven games released for the console were developed by Bandai Electronics and released in 1979.

=== List of games ===
- Missile Vader
- Space Fire
- Othello
- Gun Professional
- PacPacBird
- Submarine
- Beam Galaxian
