= Rock-Ola =

American manufacturer of coin-operated machines such as jukeboxes

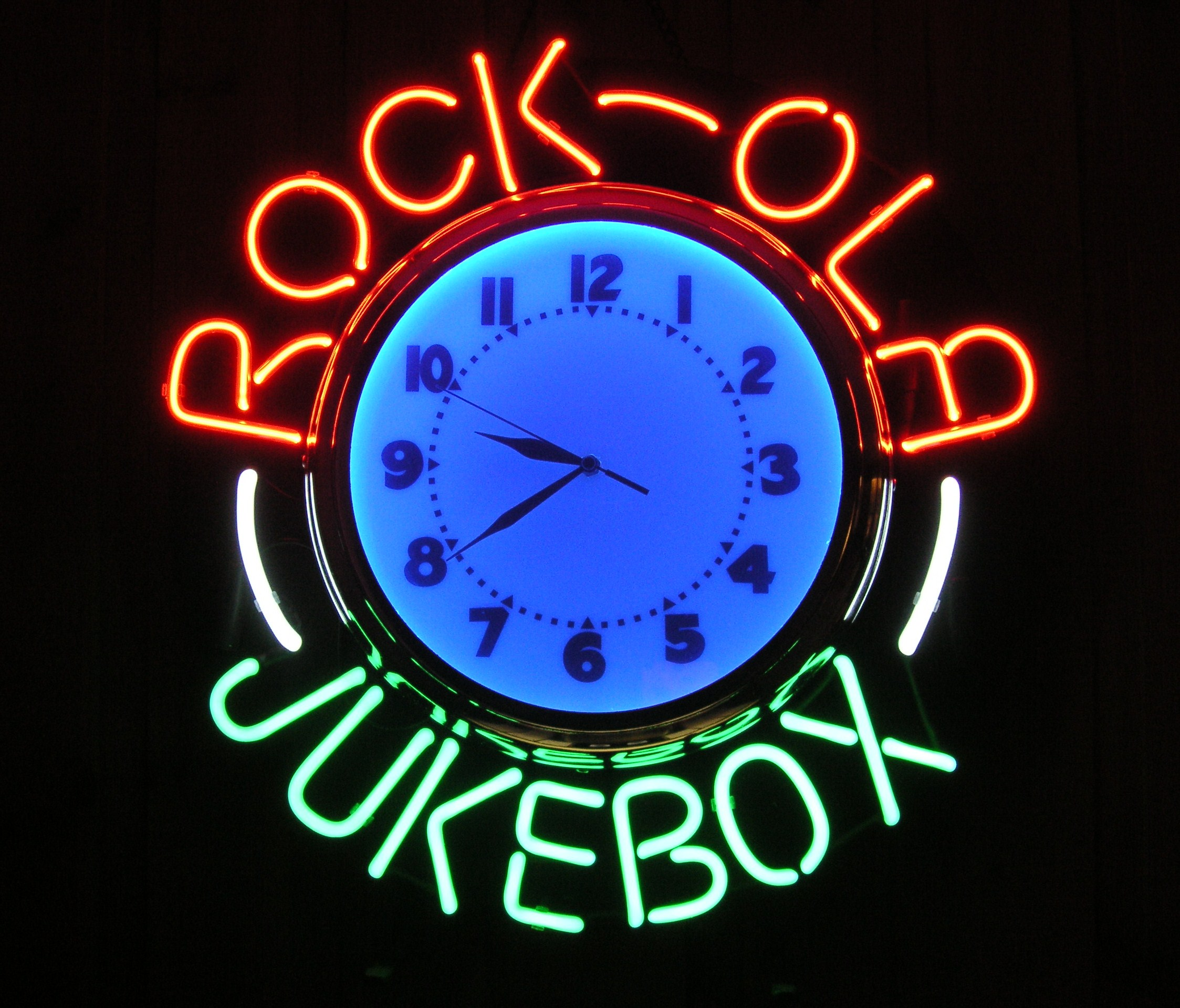
Rock-Ola neon sign

The Rock-Ola Manufacturing Corporation is an American developer and manufacturer of juke-boxes and related machinery. It was founded in 1927 by a pioneer of coin-operated machines, David Cullen Rockola, to manufacture gambling slot machines, weighing scales, and pinball machines. The firm later also produced parking meters, furniture, arcade video games, and firearms, but became best known for its jukeboxes. Rockola was changed to 'Rock-Ola', to modify the pronunciation.

== History ==
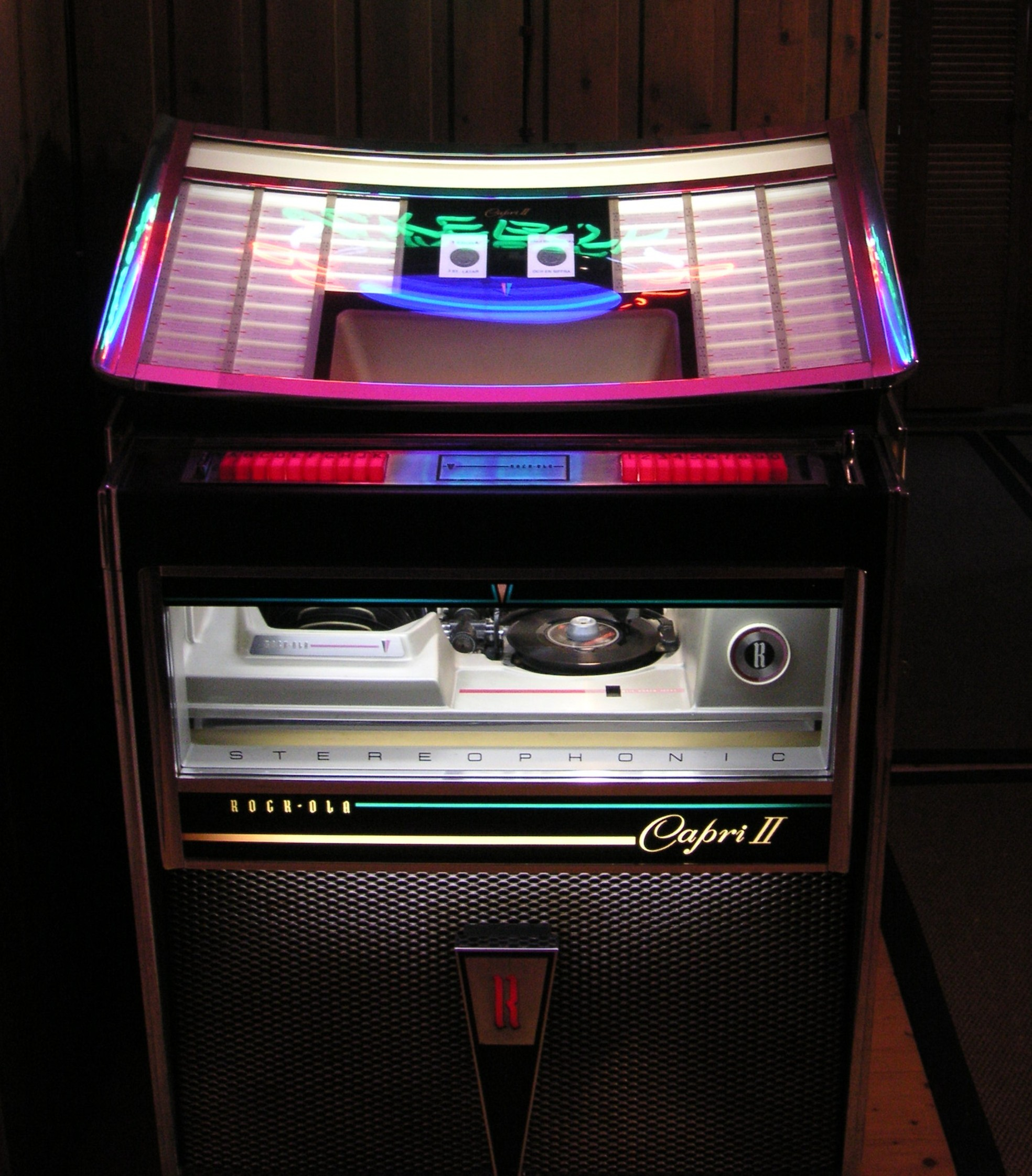
Rock-Ola Capri II from 1965

Rock-Ola Capri II in action

The Rock-Ola Scale Company was founded in 1927 by David Cullen Rockola to manufacture coin-operated entertainment machines. During the 1920s, Rockola was linked with Chicago organized crime and escaped a jail sentence by turning State's Evidence. Mr. Rockola added the hyphen because people often mispronounced his name. The name was changed to Rock-Ola Manufacturing Corporation in 1932. The company successfully expanded its production line through the Great Depression to include furniture. Starting in 1935, Rock-Ola sold more than 400,000 jukeboxes under the Rock-Ola brand name, which predated the rock and roll era by two decades, and is thought to have inspired the term.

Rock-Ola became a prime contractor for production of the M1 carbine for the US Military during World War II. Rock-Ola machined receivers, barrels, bolts, firing pins, extractors, triggers, trigger housings, sears, operating slides, gas cylinders, and recoil plates. Rock-Ola used its furniture machinery to manufacture stocks and handguards for its own production and for other prime contractors, and subcontracted production of other machined parts. Rock-Ola delivered 228,500 military carbines at $58 each before contracts were cancelled on May 31, 1944. Rock-Ola also produced approximately sixty "presentation" carbines as gifts to company executives and other officials. Presentation carbines were finished in polished blue rather than the dull Parkerizing used on military weapons, and were accompanied by a custom-made wooden case including the name of the recipient engraved on a brass plate. Some of the presentation carbines had no serial numbers, while others were numbered in a special sequence preceded by "EX". Military production carbines had serial numbers in the following range:

- 1,662,250 - 1,762,519
- 4,532,100 - 4,632,099
- 6,071,189 - 6,099,688
- 6,199,684 - 6,219,688

Rock-Ola's production total was the lowest of any successful carbine prime contractor, amounting to 3.7% of the 6,221,220 made. The relative rarity and the distinctive name increase the value of Rock-Ola carbines; and the presentation carbines are highly prized among collectors.

In 1952, a Rock-Ola M1 carbine was the murder weapon used in the killing of a prominent British scientist and his family who were holidaying in France.

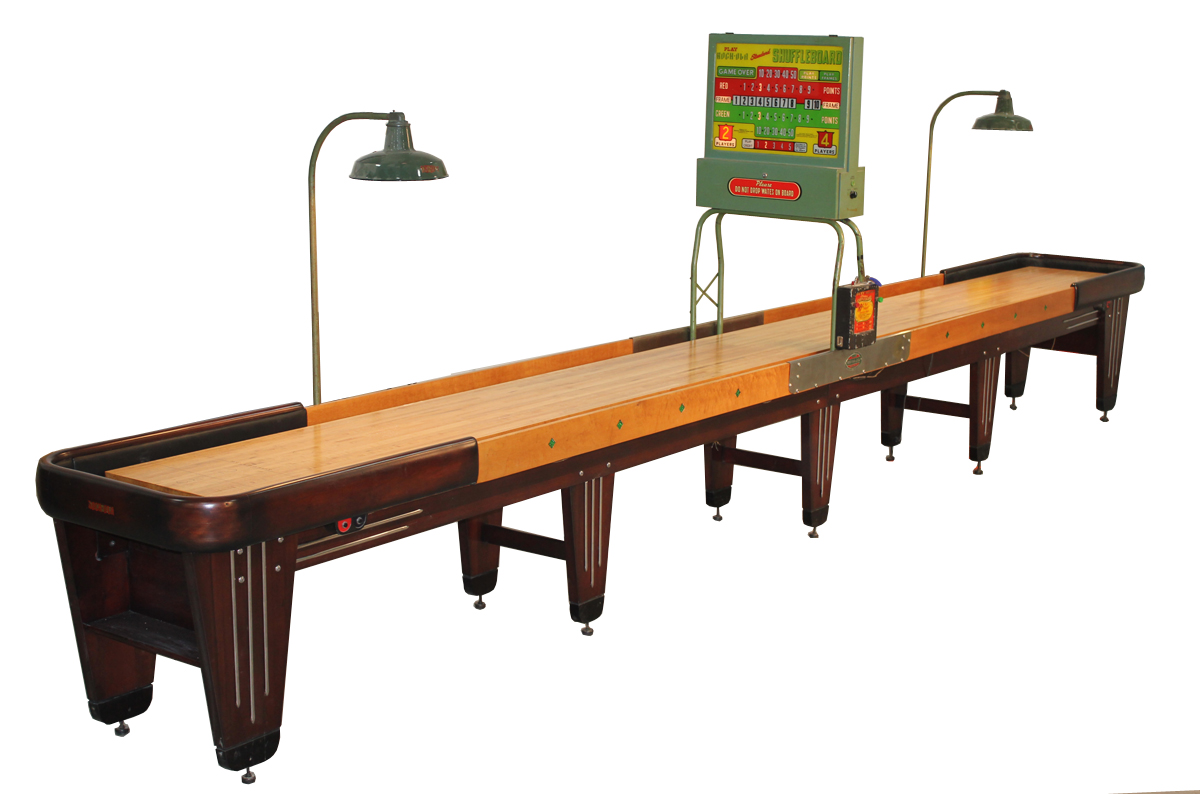
Fully Restored Rock Ola Antique Shuffleboard

Rock-Ola was also the maker of shuffleboard tables from 1948 to 1950. Considered by collectors the Cadillac of shuffleboards due to their Art Deco styling with curving woodwork and much chrome, they are highly sought after by players.

In the early 1980s, Rock-Ola produced video arcade machines, including Fantasy, (1981), Jump Bug (1981), and Eyes (1982). The most successful Rock-Ola arcade game was Nibbler.

=== Jukebox production ===
David Rockola saw the repeal of prohibition in the USA in 1932 as an opportunity to expand his amusement business into coin operated phonographs, to be placed in the now legal bars and nightclubs.

The new jukeboxes would use the brand name “Rock-Ola” and the first model – the model A – was introduced in 1935. This was a 12 selection jukebox which was replaced by 20 selection jukeboxes by 1937, the first being the model IMP-20. Many people erroneously assume the name "Rock-Ola" was a take on the famous "Victrola" brand of phonographs manufactured by RCA Victor.

Rock-Ola continued to produce a new model every year up until 1942 when the constraints of World War II had an impact. After the war, they produced what some consider as their most attractive 78 rpm player, the model 1428.

In the early 1950s, the arrival of the 45 rpm seven inch record brought major changes to jukebox designs for all manufacturers. The first 45 rpm player from Rock-Ola was the model 1434 which held 25 records, and thus 50 selections.

In 1954, the jukebox manufacturer Seeburg Corporation brought out their model HF100R. This had a major influence on Rock-Ola who then brought to market a series of models very similar in appearance to the Seeburg, these being the model 1448 in 1955, through to the model 1465 in 1958.

The late 1950s to the early 1960s saw Rock-Ola manufacture a variety of popular jukebox models, the best-sellers being the Tempo, Regis, Princess, and Empress models.

Visible playing mechanisms eventually disappeared from Rock-Ola and all other manufacturers by the mid 1960s.

Rock-Ola continued to manufacture jukeboxes into the 1970s and beyond, although the units themselves eventually became less conspicuous in the bars and clubs where they were located, ultimately most being placed out of sight.

Rock-Ola eventually sold out to Antique Apparatus in 1992, and they continue to manufacture several models of jukeboxes under the Rock-Ola name today.

=== Modern production ===
In 1977, Glenn Streeter's Antique Apparatus Company engineered, refined and manufactured the first "Nostalgic" Jukeboxes with a modern Rowe mechanism 45 rpm and later with a Philips CD-Player. Antique Apparatus acquired the Rock-Ola Corporation and name in 1992. The company currently operates in Torrance, California manufacturing a variety of jukeboxes for both commercial and home entertainment. Commercial jukeboxes feature touch screens, Peavey power amps and digital downloading of music and ad content, delivered by the AMI Network. Rock-Ola continues to manufacture Nostalgic style CD-jukeboxes and has also added state-of-the-art digital touch screen technology for the home market. The Rock-Ola line of Nostalgic Music Centers was introduced in 2006. Two new music center models, the "Mystic" and the "Q", were introduced in 2008. Rock-Ola models include: Harley-Davidson, Jack-Daniel's, Peacock, Gazelle, American - Beauties, President, Commando, Spectravox, and the new Bubblers 100 CD and its version Music - Center with a 1-terabyte hard disk drive (equivalent to 15,000 compact discs).

In 2019, a British company purchased Torrance-based Rock-Ola Manufacturing LLC; Alexander Walder-Smith, the CEO of The Games Room Company, a high-end retailer of luxury entertainment products and longtime Rock-Ola distributor, purchased the privately held company from Rancho Palos Verdes resident Glenn Streeter, who acquired the Chicago company in 1992 and moved it to Torrance. Walder-Smith will keep the production in Torrance and as well as expand operations will launch a brand new vinyl 45 Jukebox in early 2020.

Images: Rock-Ola model 404 "Capri II"

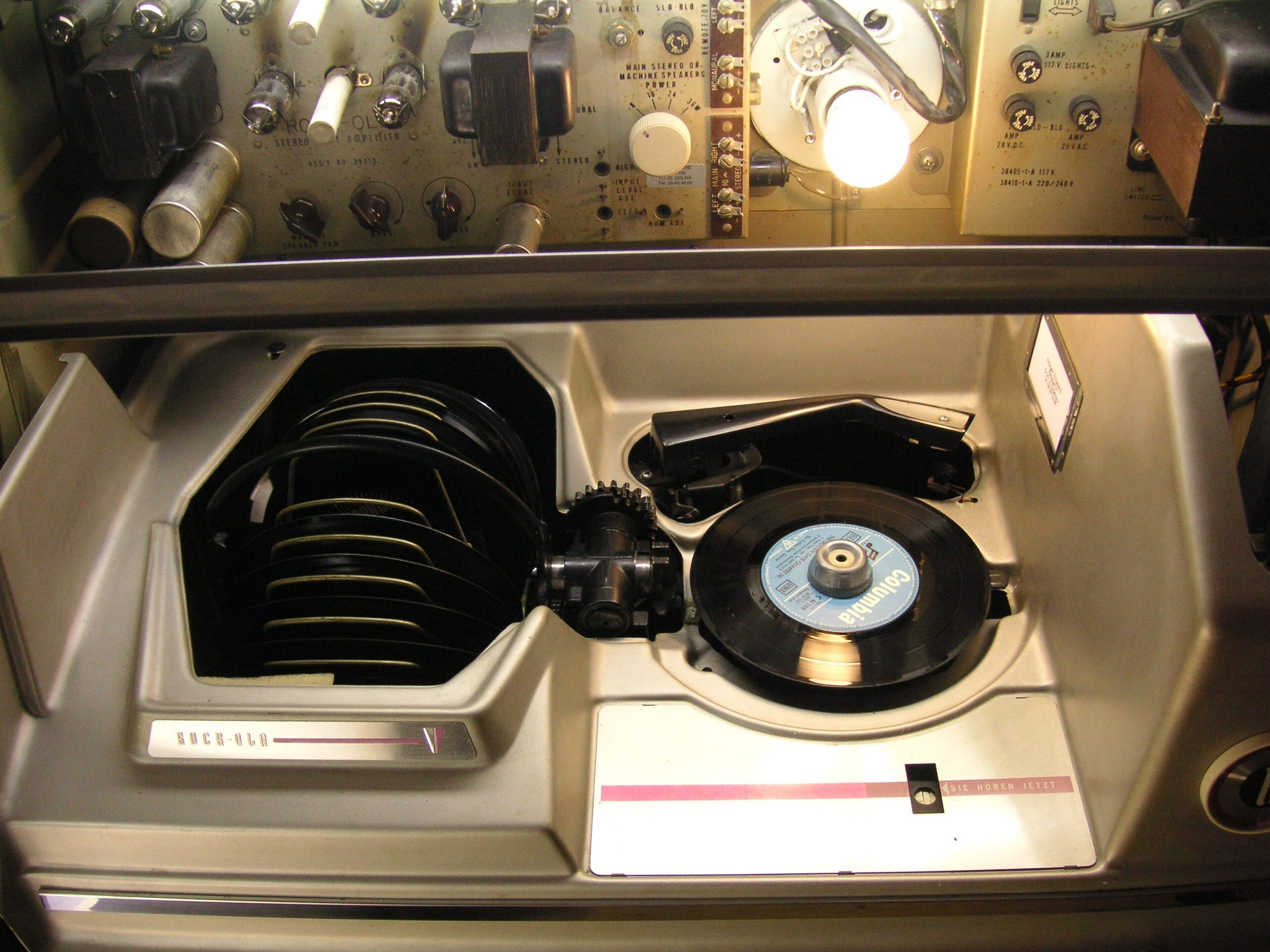

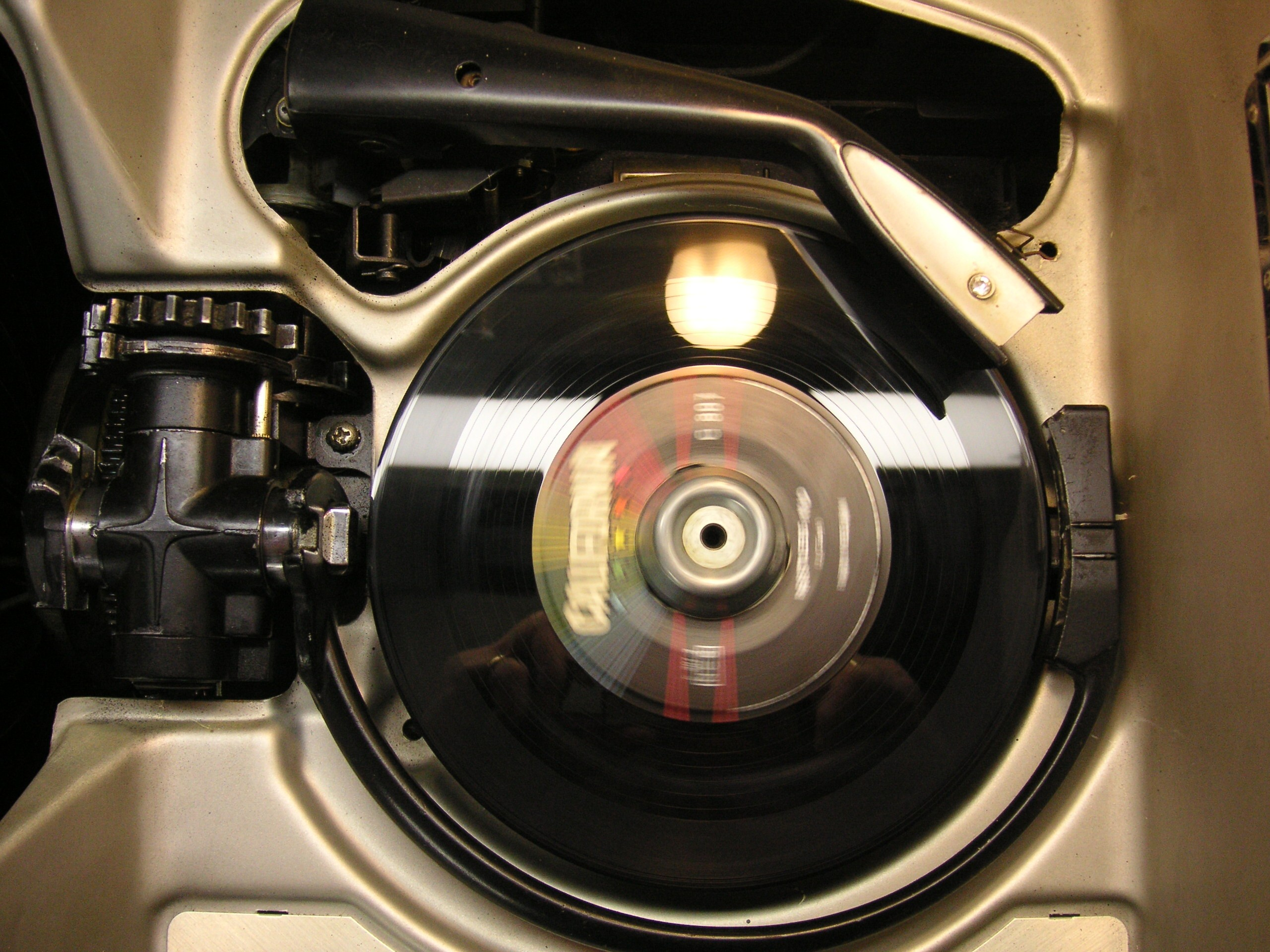

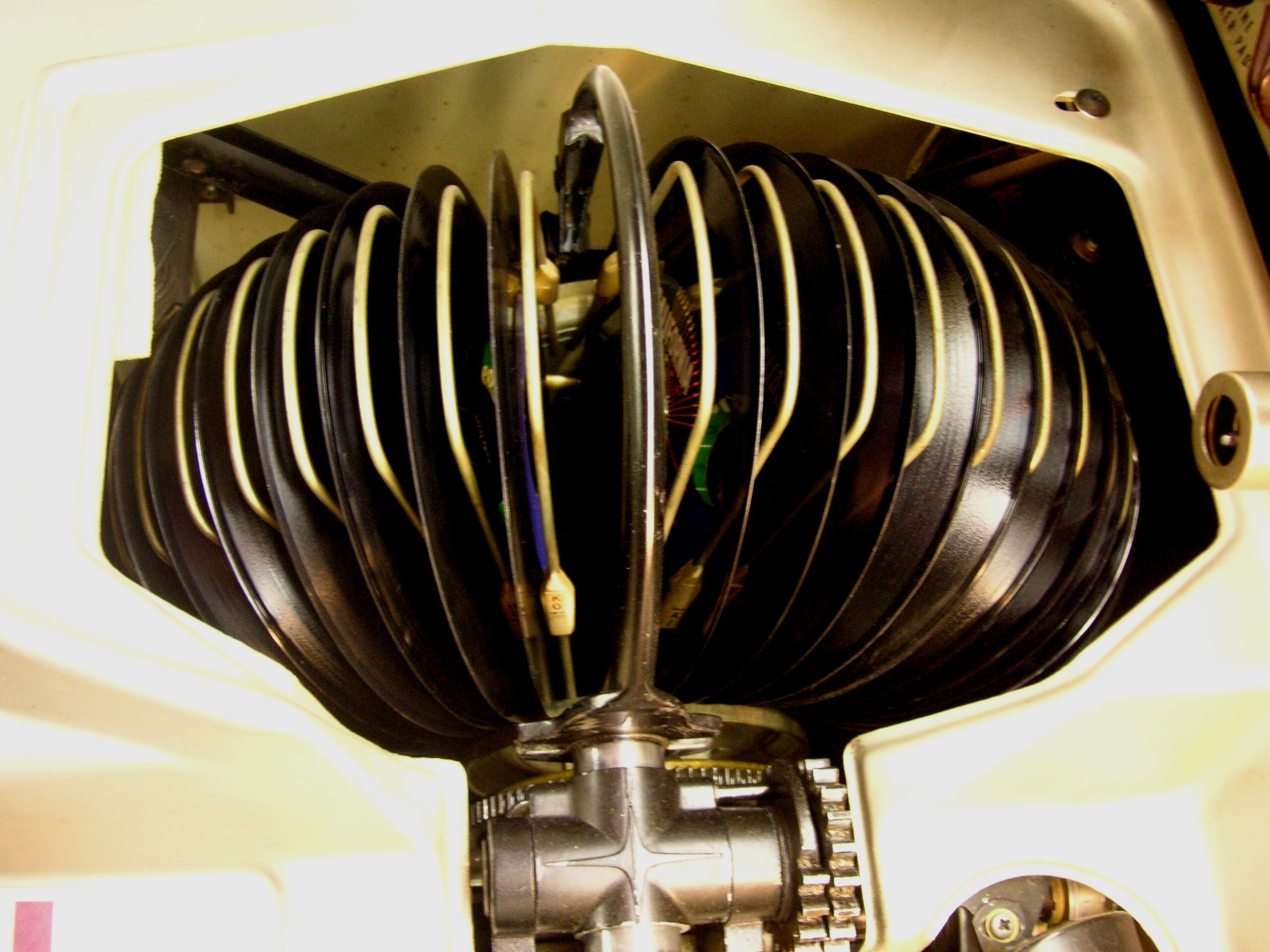

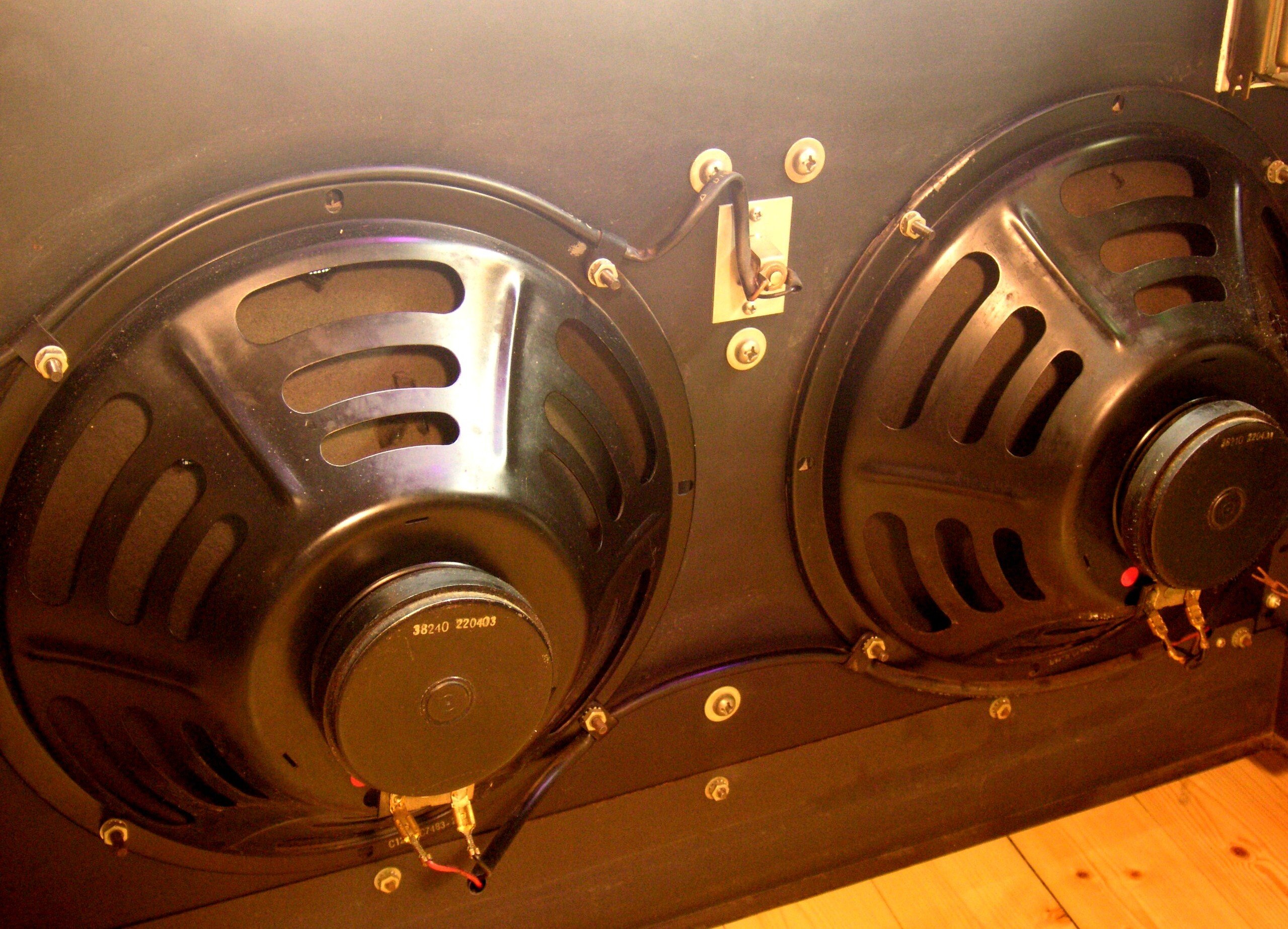

== List of video games ==
=== Developed in-house ===
- Demon (1982)
- Levers (1983)
- Nibbler (1982)
- Survival (1982)

==== Prototypes ====
- QB-3
- Rocket Racer

=== Published ===
- Eyes (Digitrex TechStar, 1982)

==== Licensed ====
- Armor Attack (Cinematronics, 1981)
- Fantasy (SNK, 1981)
- Jump Bug (Alpha Denshi, 1981)
- Mermaid (Sanritsu, 1982)
- Pioneer Balloon (SNK, 1982)
- Star Castle (Cinematronics, 1980)
- Warp Warp (Namco, 1981)
