= Leisure Vision =

Second-generation home video game console

- Developer: Leisure Dynamics
- Manufacturer: Leisure Dynamics
- Product family: Arcadia 2001
- Type: Home video game console
- Generation: Second generation
- Released: Canada: 1982
- Introductory price: US$45
- Discontinued: 1984

The Leisure Vision is a second-generation home video game console released in 1982 by now defunct Leisure Dynamics only in Canada for a price of US$45. It was one of many legally licensed releases of the Arcadia 2001 home video game console and was trademarked on March 29, 1982. The production discontinued in 1984. The console looks exactly like the 2001 except for the label on the housing and packaging of the console. It was also released in a white version which is more rare. The system is not to be confused with a clone of the Intellivision which was released under the name "Leisurevision".

It is also a version of the Tunix, a console released in New Zealand. According to Canadian video game console collector CongoBongo, the Leisure Vision should not be called a clone but a licensed version.

The Leisure Vision games library is about 25% larger than the library of the Arcadia 2001.
