= Zarzon =

1981 video game

- North American arcade flyer
- Developer: SNK
- Publishers: JP: SNK; NA: Taito
- Platform: Arcade
- Release: JP: March 1981; NA: May 1981
- Genre: Fixed shooter
- Modes: Single-player, multiplayer

Zarzon, released in Japan as Satan of Saturn (Note: Japanese: サタンオブサターン, Hepburn: Satan obu Satān), is a 1981 fixed shooter video game developed and published by SNK for arcades. The game was released in North America by Taito. The gameplay is a variation of Space Invaders.

Hamster Corporation released the game as part of their Arcade Archives series for the Nintendo Switch and PlayStation 4, as well as their Arcade Archives 2 series for the Nintendo Switch 2, PlayStation 5 and Xbox Series X/S in August 2026.

== Gameplay ==
Gameplay screenshot

The goal is to fly a spaceship to Saturn, then destroy as many Satans as possible. Additional bonus points can be accumulated by destroying the comet or attacking dragonflies. An additional spaceship is rewarded if the players score reaches 5,000 or 10,000 points. If the attacking UFOs or enemy rockets are destroyed points will be scored. The game progresses through 4 different screens.

The arcade cabinet has one joystick to move the spaceship left to right and guide the missiles.

== Legacy ==
The Zarzon upright arcade cabinet appeared in the 1983 film Joysticks.
