= Xenon (pinball) =

1980 pinball machine

- Manufacturer: Bally Manufacturing
- Release date: November 1980
- System: Bally AS-2518-35
- Model #: 1196-E
- Players: 4
- Design: Greg Kmiec
- Artwork: Paul Faris
- Music: Suzanne Ciani
- Sound: Suzanne Ciani
- Voices: Suzanne Ciani
- Production run: 11,000

Xenon is a 1980 pinball machine designed by Greg Kmiec and released by Bally. The game was not only the first talking pinball table by Bally, but also the first with a female voice.

== Design ==
The voice for the female robot theme was provided by Suzanne Ciani who also composed the music of the game. The seductive voice is for example saying "Try Xeeeeenon" in attraction mode or responds to bumper hits with some "Oooh" and "Aaah" moaning sound effects.

Xenon consists of dominant blue artwork e.g. blue bumper caps, plastic posts and bluish light that gives the game a futuristic xenon theme. A red post is used as a signature design element by Greg Kmiec.

The tube shot is the most prominent playfield feature and transports the ball from the upper-right side of the playfield to the middle-left side of the playfield. It consists of a clear acrylic tube with a string of small lights. This mechanism is protected by a patent.

An episode of Omni: The New Frontier has a segment that talks about the creation of the game's audio.

The game was initially designed as a single ball game, with the second ball introduced by Bally's research & development lab supervisor.

== Reception ==
In a retro review, Pinball Mag called the artwork legendary.

== Digital versions ==
Xenon was one of twelve titles included in the 2006 digital arcade game cabinet UltraPin.

The table was released for The Pinball Arcade in May 2015, and was available for purchase on several platforms until the developer's license to include Williams and Bally tables expired in July 2018.

== See also ==
- The Machine: Bride of Pin•Bot
