= Dialed In! (pinball) =

2017 pinball machine

- Dialed In! (LE) pinball flyer
- Manufacturer: Jersey Jack Pinball
- Release date: July 2017
- Players: 4
- Design: Pat Lawlor
- Programming: Joe Katz; Ted Estes
- Artwork: John Youssi
- Mechanics: Eric Meunier
- Music: David Thiel
- Sound: David Thiel
- Animation: Jean-Paul de Win; J Zielinski

Dialed In! is a 2017 pinball machine manufactured by Jersey Jack Pinball. It was the third machine released, after The Wizard of Oz and The Hobbit. Unlike its predecessors it is not based on a third-party license, and is in a standard size cabinet. It innovatively blends special effects using an illusion, and a smartphone screen to create a disaster-themed pinball table with links to many of Pat Lawlor's previous tables.

== Overview ==
Dialed In! is the first game designed by Pat Lawlor for Jersey Jack Pinball, nearly 10 years after his previous pinball machine, Shrek (for Stern). It was initially unveiled at the 32nd annual Pinball Expo in Chicago. Jack Guarnieri, the founder of the company, stated at the time "This machine embodies our company-wide mission to bring premium, no-compromise games to our fans, with features that have never been seen before in a pinball game."

Before full release a prototype was shown at several locations, with its European launch in Germany in February 2017. This is the first game to use a swinging mount for the 27" 1080p LCD screen in the backbox to allow access to the electronics behind it. Unlike earlier games this is where the computer controlling the game is located. The game is the first production pinball machine to include a digital camera, which is located at the bottom of the backbox. This employs face recognition technology to capture portraits of the player for the high score leaderboard, and an innovative ‘selfie mode’ also showcases the game camera. It is also the first pinball machine to feature bluetooth connectivity, which enabled control of the game using a mobile phone app, but support for this app was removed from game code version 1.75 onwards in 2021. It is also the first pinball machine to use three screens.

The idea of putting a camera on a pinball machine was first conceived by Jack Guarnieri when working as an operator in 1977. He wanted to put a Polaroid camera on a game to take the player's picture for a high score as a keepsake of a great game.

RGB-LED playfield lightning is used which change colour to indicate various shots and modes as the game is played. There is a five speaker 2.1 stereo surround sound system.

Three versions were released: a standard version, a limited version with a maximum of 2,500 units, and a time limited collector's version.

The original working title for this machine was "killer app"; another employee at Jersey Jack, Keith Johnson, thought of the name "Dialed In".

== Animation ==
display

During the earlier part of development ideas for the theme of the machine had evolved to 1950s disaster movies including attacks by aliens and giant spiders. John Youssi had created some early artwork of a city in mayhem.

Jean-Paul de Win, animator for this game, suggested displaying the city on the LCD with a fish-eye perspective with the idea to zoom into everything in 3D. This proved too taxing to process in real time on the machines hardware so a high-resolution pre-rendered 3D version of the city was created with various overlays. The basis of the design of Quantum City is a sketch drawn by John Youssi. A colleague of Jean-Paul de Win then created 3D models of over 20 buildings and the train which de Win then arranged, textured, and lit to form the main image of the city. Many animations are overlaid onto the view of the city, including traffic in the streets.

Part of the user interface is designed like a television news broadcast reporting on events happening in the city. This includes scrolling news on the bottom line of the main display. The news channel was initially named JJP3 because this is Jersey Jack Pinball's third game, but the name JJP8 was settled on because in the US news channels were frequently found on channel 7 or 8, with the more sensational headlines on channel 8. The iconography of the logo used resembles that used by Dutch TV station SBS6 in 2016 which was also designed by Jean-Paul de Win.

== Layout ==
playfield

The game has three flippers, including mid-field flipper on the right. It has a double inlane on the left side and a single inlane on the right side. Low on the left side are B-O-B standup targets, and a little above these is a trap-door. In an elevated position is a physical ball-lock mechanism based on a train station; this can be reached with a shot from the upper flipper. The left outlane has a kickback.

The crossed hashlines extending from the flippers up most of the playfield were first conceived for the prototype of Wizard Blocks, the cancelled Williams Pinball 2000 game. Above where these cross in the middle of the playfield is a moving QED character target. There are 3 magnets underneath the playfield in this area which are used in some modes; in earlier design iterations of the machine there was a lightning bolt insert to indicate when these were on, but was removed due to lack of space underneath the playfield in this area.

quantum reality theatre, and "smartphone"

The Quantum reality theatre is in the centre of the game, towards the back of the playfield. The ball can either be held by a magnet, or continue through. This theatre is an assembly containing a 4.3" LCD hidden at the top which reflects an image off a mirror reflector. Using Pepper's ghost illusion technique in an innovative way this makes various objects appear in the path of the ball. In combination with the magnet, virtual drop-targets are used in one mode.

There is an illuminated cityscape back panel, near this at the back right are three pop bumpers. Above these is a Betty mechanic sculpture assembly which is used as a diverter by blocking the ball on an adjacent wireform. The design of Betty was inspired by one of the Uniroyal gals which held a tire, similar to the one in Blackwood. Betty is also shown in the city on the main display.

Towards the right is a "smartphone", with a scoop just below it. The smartphone is made from a 4.3" LCD screen with a driver board and RGB LED board contained in a housing resembling a smartphone. Its operation is controlled by the games computer.

Across from the upper flipper is the SIM card scoop.

Lower down on the right are three drones, each with four propellers that can spin. These have no affect on gameplay, which instead uses a magnet and a red stand-up target underneath them.

== Variations in editions ==
All versions have the same cabinet and backbox artwork; all versions include a shaker motor.

The limited edition has Quantum mist blue clear coat body armor, invisiglass, 3D etched emblem on the quantum reality theatre, headphone jack, lights on the left ramp, and a numbered plaque. The collector's version also has Quantum haze blue clear coat body armor, laser cut side armour, a topper, mirrored back panel, radcals on the cabinet, and is signed by Pat Lawlor, Jack Guarnieri, and John Youssi. The collector's edition also has a special attract mode.

== Gameplay ==
Gameplay is the same between all versions of the table. The game is set in Quantum City which is shown on the main monitor in the backbox. There is a SimCity vibe, with a range of disasters hitting it. The in-game phone receives calls from residents of the city when a disaster strikes. A comic was released which shows as a prelude to the game the player buying a phone from Crazy Bob that is revealed to be a prototype from Dialed In Electronics, and that the phone is capable of generating disasters.

The game begins with a skill shot that can give one of six awards, and a super skill shot or super duper skill shot can then be attempted.

There are three crazy Bob modes, including a novel mode called "crazy lottery frenzy" which involves hitting a shot and then waving at the camera to rub off a lottery ticket. There are also three quick multiball modes - one each based on the drones, QED target, and Betty mechanic. There are two main multiballs; under attack multiball where the flippers come under attack and can be briefly disabled, and quantum theatre multiball.

There are 11 main modes, called disaster modes. These can all be started at the phone after charging it by hitting the QED target, and scoring in these modes depends on the level of the phones charge. The modes are alien invasion, eruption, tidal wave, whirl wind, EMP strike, flash fires, sinkholes, meteor storm, earth shaker, acid rain, and singularity. A mini-wizard mode, Chaos in Quantum City can be played after six disaster modes have been played, and Armageddon can be played after all 11 main disaster modes have been played.

As the game is played, SIM cards can be collected which upgrade the phone for higher scores. After eight cards have been collected for D-I-A-L-E-D-I-N the wizard mode called showdown can be started, which involves a multiball with unlimited ballsaves until either the player or their opponent, the head of Dialed In Electronics (D.I.E.), is defeated.

At the end of a game, a QR code was shown to tweet the score, but this feature was deprecated in a 2025 update to the code.

== Reception ==
The game had generally positive reviews, despite the Collector's Edition retailing for $12,500.

== Heritage ==
There are numerous references to Pat Lawlor's previous games designed at Williams. Also Crazy Bob features prominently and was in several other Williams games. In this game the voicework for Crazy Bob was done by Joe Katz.

Whirl Wind disaster mode is named after Whirlwind. After winning the mode "all clear, return to your home" audio from that game is played. Earth Shaker disaster mode is named after Earthshaker!

The phone call for the Sink Holes disaster mode is made by Ted, from Red & Ted's Road Show. In the same mode is the phrase "You think it was gophers?" which refers to No Good Gofers.

During drone multiball Fester's chair from The Addams Family and the gumball machine from Twilight Zone are shown. The inverted triangle with an eye used as the logo of D.I.E. between the flippers and on the phone has similarities to the pyramid with an eye used on the Powerfield in Twilight Zone.

The voice actress for MANDI (machine assistant) in this game is the same as for CANDY in Safe Cracker. Two callouts from FunHouse are in the game.

The crossed hashlines extending from the flippers were first conceived for the prototype of Wizard Blocks.
