= Digital Compression System =

Digital Compression System, or DCS, is a sound system developed by Williams Electronics. This advanced sound board was used in Williams and Bally pinball games, coin-op arcade video games by Midway Manufacturing, and mechanical and video slot machines by Williams Gaming. This sound system became the standard for these game platforms.

The DCS Sound system was created by Williams sound engineers Matt Booty and Ed Keenan, and further developed by Andrew Eloff. The system uses four channels of 16-bit digital audio, usually with one channel used for music, and three for sound effects. DCS was designed to improve sound quality, and streamline sound development.

== Versions of DCS ==
- DCS ROM-based mono: The first version of DCS used an Analog Devices ADSP2105 DSP (clocked at 10MHz) and a DMA-driven DAC, outputting in mono. This was used for the majority of Williams and Midway's pinball games (starting with 1993's Indiana Jones: The Pinball Adventure), as well as Midway's video games, up until the late 1990s. The pinball game, The Twilight Zone, was originally supposed to use the DCS System, but because the DCS board was still in development at the time, all of the music and sounds for this game were reprogrammed for the Yamaha YM2151 / Harris CVSD sound board.
  - DCS-95: This was a revised version of the original DCS System (allowing for 16MB of data instead of 8MB to be addressed), used for Williams and Midway's WPC-95 pinball system.
- DCS2 ROM-based stereo: This version used the ADSP2104 DSP and two DMA-driven DACs, outputting in stereo. This was used in Midway's Zeus-based hardware, and in the short-lived Pinball 2000 platform.
- DCS2 RAM-based stereo: This version used the ADSP2115 DSP and two DMA-driven DACs, outputting in stereo. This was used in Midway's 3DFX-based hardware (NFL Blitz, etc.). This system would be adopted by Atari Games, following their acquisition by WMS Industries.
- DCS2 RAM-based multi-channel: This version used the ADSP2181 DSP and up to six DMA-driven DACs, outputting in multichannel sound.

== Pinball games using DCS ==
- Indiana Jones: The Pinball Adventure (1993)
- Judge Dredd (1993)
- Star Trek: The Next Generation (1993)
- Demolition Man (1994)
- Popeye Saves the Earth (1994)
- World Cup Soccer (1994)
- The Flintstones (1994)
- Corvette (1994)
- Red & Ted's Road Show (1994)
- The Shadow (1994)
- Dirty Harry (1995)
- Theatre of Magic (1995)
- No Fear: Dangerous Sports (1995)
- Indianapolis 500 (1995)
- Johnny Mnemonic (1995)
- Who Dunnit (1995)
- Jack*Bot (1995)
- Congo (1995) (DCS95)
- Attack From Mars (1995) (DCS95)
- Safe Cracker (1996) (DCS95)
- Tales of the Arabian Nights (1996) (DCS95)
- Scared Stiff (1996) (DCS95)
- Junk Yard (1996) (DCS95)
- NBA Fastbreak (1997) (DCS95)
- Cirqus Voltaire (1997) (DCS95)
- Medieval Madness (1997) (DCS95)
- No Good Gofers (1997) (DCS95)
- The Champion Pub (1998) (DCS95)
- Monster Bash (1998) (DCS95)
- Cactus Canyon (1998) (DCS95)
- Revenge From Mars (1999) (DCS2 ROM-based)
- Star Wars Episode I (1999) (DCS2 ROM-based)

== Arcade games using DCS ==
- Mortal Kombat II (1993)
- Cruis'n USA (1994)
- Killer Instinct (1994)
- Revolution X (1994)
- NHL Open Ice (1995)
- Killer Instinct 2 (1995)
- Mortal Kombat 3 (1995)
- Ultimate Mortal Kombat 3 (1995)
- War Gods (1995) (DCS2 RAM-based)
- WWF WrestleMania: The Arcade Game (1995)
- Cruis'n World (1996)
- Mace: The Dark Age (1996) (DCS2 RAM-based)
- NBA Hangtime (1996)
- NBA Maximum Hangtime (1996)
- Wayne Gretzky's 3D Hockey (1996) (DCS2 RAM-based)
- Invasion (1997) (DCS2 ROM-based)
- Mortal Kombat 4 (1997) (DCS2 ROM-based)
- NFL Blitz (1997) (DCS2 RAM-based)
- Offroad Challenge (1997)
- Rampage World Tour (1997)
- California Speed (1998) (DCS2 RAM-based)
- CarnEvil (1998) (DCS2 RAM-based)
- Gauntlet Legends (1998) (DCS2 RAM-based)
- Hyperdrive (1998) (DCS2 RAM-based)
- NBA Showtime (1998) (DCS2 RAM-based)
- NFL Blitz '99 (1998) (DCS2 RAM-based)
- Cruis'n Exotica (1999) (DCS2 ROM-based)
- San Francisco Rush 2049 (1999) (DCS2 RAM-based multichannel)
- Vapor TRX (1998) (DCS2 RAM-based)
- Gauntlet Dark Legacy (1999) (DCS2 RAM-based)
- NFL Blitz 2000 (1999) (DCS2 RAM-based)
- Road Burners (1999) (DCS2 RAM-based multichannel)
- War The Final Assault (1999) (DCS2 RAM-based)
- CART Fury (2000) (DCS2 RAM-based)
- The Grid (arcade game) (2001) (DCS2 ROM-based)
