= SuperPin =

Pinball game name

SuperPin is the name given to any of the widebody pinball games released by Williams and Midway (under the Bally name) between 1993 and late-1994.

The playfield (being almost as wide as the backbox of the machine) is approximately one shooter lane width wider (approximately 2.75") than a standard body machine. They fit in the same size box for distribution, and can fit in the same floor space but are heavier than a typical machine. Earlier widebodies had a reputation for playing "floaty", in that the ball generally moved more slowly than standard machines, and the most recent Bally/Williams widebody release had been Embryon in 1981. After the success of The Addams Family in 1992, Pat Lawlor was given full creative control for The Twilight Zone and pushed for it to be a widebody due to the stronger flippers that had become available in recent years.

These games often included extra gimmicks and toys which added to the gameplay (e.g., the gumball machine in Twilight Zone, the dual phasers cannons in Star Trek: The Next Generation or the alternate "SUPERGAME" ruleset of Judge Dredd). All of the SuperPins used the DCS Sound System, except for Twilight Zone.

The games were considered to be commercially successful with 3 of the 7 selling over 10,000 units, and only Popeye Saves the Earth failing to sell 5,000 units.

== Games ==
There were seven games released under the SuperPin label:

- The Twilight Zone (Midway; designed by Pat Lawlor, released April 1993)
- Indiana Jones: The Pinball Adventure (Williams; designed by Mark Ritchie, released August 1993)
- Judge Dredd (Midway; designed by John Trudeau, released September 1993)
- Star Trek: The Next Generation (Williams; designed by Steve Ritchie, released November 1993)
- Popeye Saves the Earth (Midway; designed by Python Anghelo and Barry Oursler, released January 1994)
- Demolition Man (Williams; designed by Dennis Nordman, released April 1994)
- Red & Ted's Road Show (Williams; designed by Pat Lawlor, released October 1994)
