= Twilight Zone (pinball) =

1993 pinball machine

- Manufacturer: Midway
- Release date: April 1993
- System: Midway WPC (Fliptronics II)
- Model #: 50020
- Players: 1-4
- Design: Pat Lawlor, Larry DeMar, Ted Estes
- Programming: Larry DeMar, Ted Estes
- Artwork: John Youssi
- Mechanics: John Krutsch
- Music: Chris Granner
- Sound: Chris Granner, Rich Karstens
- Voices: Tim Kitzrow (Rod Serling)
- Production run: 15,235

Twilight Zone is a widebody pinball machine, designed by Pat Lawlor and based on the TV series of the same name. It was first released in 1993 by Midway (under the Bally label). This game is the first of WMS' SuperPin line of widebody games; Star Trek: The Next Generation and Indiana Jones: The Pinball Adventure released later in 1993.

== Design ==
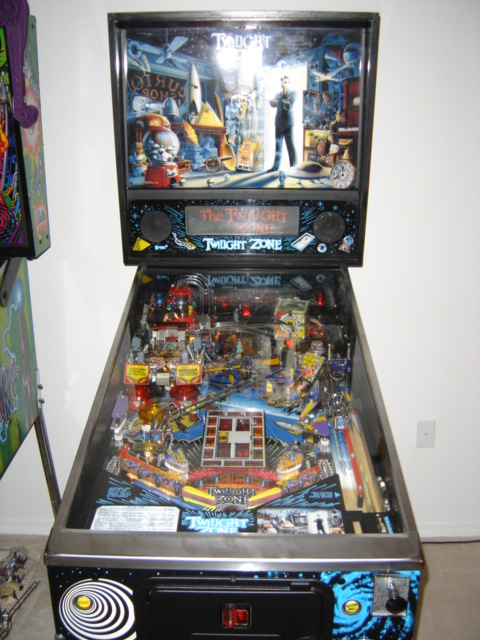

Following the huge success of The Addams Family pinball game, Midway gave Lawlor full creative control over the design of his next game, and the result is an unusually complex machine. The game took 16 months to design. Lawlor described the game as having "flippers that aren’t flippers, pinballs that aren’t pinballs, and a clock that’s not a clock". It included more features and patents than any prior pinball game.

Special features of the game include:

- A working gumball machine that holds three balls and can dispense them or receive others during play
- A working, 12-hour analog clock that acts as a timer during certain modes and can also display the current time
- The Powerball, a white ceramic ball that is unaffected by magnets and 20% lighter than the other steel balls in the machine
- The Powerfield, a triangular mini-playfield with magnets under its lower corners that can propel the ball

The Powerball can enter play by being served to the plunger, ejected from the Lock, or dispensed from the Gumball Machine; while it is on the field, certain scoring rules are changed. Different colors for the balls were considered during the design stage, but only blue and white ceramic ones were available when the decision was made to use that material. Tests with the blue ball in a White Water prototype machine revealed that it would be difficult to see against the playfield art, so the white one was used instead. With early test units, players had difficulty seeing that the shot to load the Gumball Machine was on the right side of the playfield, despite the machine itself being in the upper left corner. Lamps and signs were added to delineate the shot more clearly before production began.

In addition to adapting the theme music from the original TV show, the game's main background music is an interpretation of the 1982 song "Twilight Zone", by Golden Earring. George Kooymans, the writer of the song, accepted a Twilight Zone machine in exchange for the right to use this music. Tim Kitzrow provided the voice of Rod Serling.

This game was originally supposed to mark the debut of Williams / Midway's DCS Sound System. However, because the DCS board was still in development when the game was released, it instead used the Yamaha YM2151 / Harris CVSD soundboard.

Chris Granner later released some tracks composed for the DCS, but never used on the production machine.

== Gameplay ==
In the center of the Twilight Zone playfield artwork is a door similar to the one shown in one of the TV show's opening sequences. The outside edge consists of 14 panels indicating various awards that are available for the player to collect. Some of the panels start timed modes that can be "stacked" (made to run concurrently), while other panels simply light shots or award points. The ultimate goal of the game is to light all 14 panels and start "Lost in the Zone", the game's "wizard mode", represented by the doorknob. The lights on the central portion of the door indicate the player's progress toward earning locks to start multi-ball play.

The game provides several ways to light door panels: Shoot the Slot Machine when lit, shoot the Player Piano when lit, or defeat the Power in the mini-playfield. Shooting the Slot Machine awards a random unlit panel, while the other two methods award the panel that is currently flashing (rotated by the pop bumpers). The Slot Machine follows two rules in choosing the door panel to be awarded:

1. The flashing panel will not be given unless it is the only one the player has yet to collect.
2. "Lite Extra Ball" (see below) will not be given unless it is either the last panel remaining or the one not flashing if the player is two panels away from completing the set.

Shooting the Player Piano when it is unlit awards Odd Change, a random number of points between 10 and 10 million.

Hits to the three pop bumpers add to the Town Square value, which can be collected by shooting through them to the Dead End lane. Shooting the lane when lit scores double points and advances the player toward various awards. Bumper values can be increased by making a Skill Shot or by shooting the Camera when unlit; the latter shot can be accessed by raising the upper left flipper to shoot the ball into a sinkhole behind it.

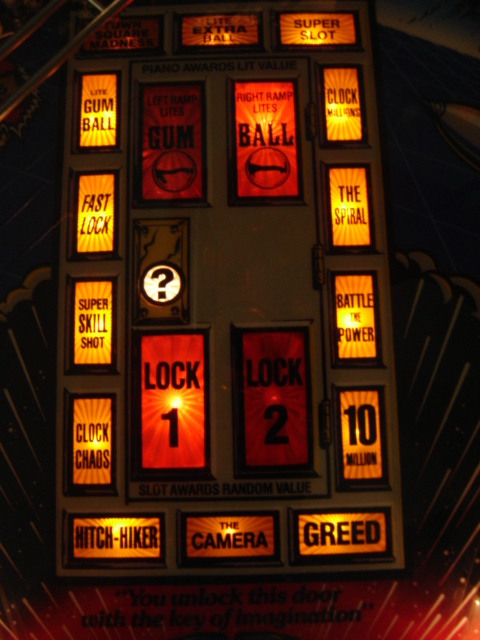
Door panels in attract mode

The door panels are as follows:

- 10 Million – Awards 10 million points. Making a yellow Skill Shot automatically spots this panel.
- Lite Gumball – Lights the Gumball Machine; a shot to the right orbit will load the current ball into it and dispense the next one in line.
- Town Square Madness – Starts a timed mode in which all targets on the playfield increase a point total by a set amount, while the pop bumpers increase the value for each target and cause townspeople to panic.
- Fast Lock – An AM radio plays clips from Pat Lawlor's previous pinball games in reverse chronological order as a hurry-up countdown begins. Shooting the Lock awards the remaining points and starts a three-ball multi-ball in which each shot to the Lock awards the value again. The background music during this multi-ball is the main multi-ball music from the game in whose section of the radio dial the player collects the hurry-up. The games referenced are, in order, The Addams Family, FunHouse, Whirlwind, Earthshaker!, and Banzai Run which is the reverse order of release.
- Super Skill Shot – Lights the Super Skill Shot on the left ramp. A successful shot will return the ball to the plunger, allowing the player to attempt a skill shot for one of three special bonuses: Red lights "Battle the Power", orange lights the outlines ("Extra Ball" on the left, "Special" on the right), and yellow lights "Extra Ball". Attempting the shot awards 10 million points, whether the player earns an award or not.
- Super Slot – Timed mode. Each shot to the Slot Machine awards a random point value (10-20 million) and gives a random door panel if lit as normal.
- Lite Extra Ball – Lights "Extra Ball," which must be collected by shooting the Lock. Under the default settings, receiving an extra ball by any means before earning this panel will automatically spot it.
- The Camera – Lights the Camera twice. Shooting it yields one of eight awards: "20 Million Points", "Lite Outlanes", "Clock 10 Millions", "Collect Bonus", "3X Town Square", "Hold Town Square", "10 Hitchhikers", and "Greed Targets". In normal play, the offered award remains the same from player to player, and from game to game, until it is collected. The Camera must go through all eight awards before it can offer any of them again; when the last award of the eight is collected, the Camera will not immediately offer it again.
- The Spiral – Timed mode. Shooting the orbits causes the ball to stop on the Spiral magnets for the first three shots (10/10/15 million), then awards 15 million "Breakthrough" points for each subsequent shot as the ball goes through the loop. Spiral Awards and shots to the Gumball Machine can be collected as in normal play.
- Clock Millions – Timed mode. Shooting the clock target (between the two ramps) awards 1 million points times the position of the hour hand on the clock. (A similar mode, "Clock 10 Millions", is started via the Camera and awards 10 million points per hit, regardless of the hour hand's position.)
- Battle the Power – Lights the right ramp for access to the Powerfield and a chance to play the "Battle the Power" mode, if the player is not using the Powerball at the time.
- Greed – Timed mode. All of the 5-million-point targets are initially lit; hitting one adds its value to the mode total and unlights it. After the last target is hit, all seven of them light up again.
- Hitch-Hiker – Awards 2 million points for each hitchhiker the player has picked up thus far in the game, and another 2 million for every additional pickup earned until the end of the current ball.
- Clock Chaos – Timed mode. The clock starts at 6:00 and begins running slowly backward, playing "Pop Goes the Weasel" throughout. Hitting the clock target awards 1 million points times the position of the hour hand, and the clock reverses direction and speeds up. The mode ends when the clock reaches 12:00. If the target is hit enough times (somewhere around 7) Rudy (a character from FunHouse, voiced by Ed Boon) complains, "Quit playin' with the clock!"

=== Battle the Power ===
During normal single-ball play, the right ramp can be lit to play "Battle the Power" by the following means:

- Collecting the "Battle the Power" door panel
- Collecting set numbers of hitchhiker pickups
- Collecting every second Spiral Award
- Collecting the Red award on a Super Skill Shot

Shooting the ramp sends the ball onto the Powerfield, a triangular mini-playfield at the left edge of the table with switches set into the walls. Underneath the bottom corners are two medium-power magnets (dubbed "Magna-Flips") that are controlled by the flipper buttons. The goal is to direct the ball into the top hole within a time limit, scoring points for hitting the switches. If the player succeeds, the total for the round is doubled and the currently flashing door panel is awarded. ("Lost in the Zone" can be started in this manner if all door panels have been collected.) If time runs out or if the ball falls through the bottom hole, the player only scores the points accumulated during that round.

Since the Powerball is unaffected by magnets, the game will automatically disable "Battle the Power" whenever it senses that this ball is on the field. If the player either lights "Battle the Power" or already has it lit when the Powerball enters play, that ramp will light or re-light once normal single-ball play resumes. Whenever the mode is not in play, a carriage on the ramp catches balls and drops them in front of the upper left flipper.

=== Multiball ===
In addition to the multitude of single-ball modes, Twilight Zone also offers four multiball modes:

- Standard Multiball (3-ball) – Started by shooting both ramps to light the lock and then locking three balls. Jackpots are awarded for shooting the Player Piano when lit and are re-lit by shooting the Camera. The player can increase the jackpot value by hitting the flashing 5 million targets, and can score a double jackpot by shooting the Powerball into the Player Piano. In normal settings, the player has two ways to start the first multi-ball: lock two balls and then shoot either the lock or left ramp, or shoot the left ramp after locking only one ball to play for a reduced starting jackpot. If the player loses two balls without scoring any jackpots, a shot to the lock within a set time limit will restart the multi-ball.
- Powerball Mania (3-ball) – Started when the player successfully loads the Powerball into the Gumball Machine, and awards a bonus based on how many 5-million-point targets were hit while it was in play. The clock begins to run, starting at 12:00; until it reaches 12:00 again, all targets/switches award a set point value. "Battle the Power" is lit on the right ramp, and can be played while simultaneously making other shots. Defeating the Power awards 50 million points and requires the player to shoot the left ramp before another battle can take place.
- Fast Lock Multiball (3-ball) – See the description in single-ball modes.
- Lost in the Zone (6-ball) – The game's wizard mode, awarded for successfully lighting all of the door panels. The doorknob (bearing a question mark) becomes lit, and the mode can be started by shooting the Player Piano or Slot Machine, or by winning a "Battle the Power" round in normal play. The player has approximately 45 seconds to hit as many targets as possible, with lost balls being automatically returned to play. Clock Millions, Town Square Madness, Greed, Super Slot, Dead End, Battle the Power, and Odd Change are all active, and shots to the Hitchhiker and left ramp award bonus points. Once time runs out, all targets and flippers go dead and all balls are allowed to drain. The total score is tallied while the machine refills the Gumball Machine, cycling the balls so that the Powerball goes in last. The gameplay then returns to normal, with all door panels unlit, and the player can immediately start making progress toward lighting them again. The machine keeps track of the highest total earned during this mode, and a player who exceeds it is allowed to enter their initials as "Lost in the Zone" Champion.

An "Extra Ball" button on the front of the machine allows the player to spend one credit at the end of a game and continue with one more ball, instead of starting a new one.

Note: In most commercially released machines, the Standard multi-ball mode starts with three balls being released sequentially from either the Lock or the auto plunger, depending on how many balls are physically contained in the Lock at the time. An alternative start to this mode is available in some versions of the ROM software and requires that a third magnet be installed in the Spiral orbit (standard machines only have two magnets). This allows the machine to lock all three balls in the Spiral Magnets and then release them simultaneously.

=== Home ROM ===
Ted Estes' primary roles in the game design were to find bugs and implement remedies for them, and to make minor improvements to the features in the ROM without altering the rules. He also created a separate home ROM, which could only be used with the machine set to "free play" and which had three additional features:

- A Lost in the Zone practice round, which did not allow players to enter their initials if they exceeded the mode's high score.
- With an extra magnet installed, the ability to hold a ball on all three spiral loop magnets at the start of multiball.
- The ability to pause the game for up to 15 minutes by holding a ball on a flipper.

== Heritage ==
In addition to the call-outs noted above there is a plastic on the top right of the playfield with a route between locations referencing all of Pat Lawlor's previous games. Tokyo (Banzai Run) ->Los Angeles (Earthshaker!) ->Kansas (Whirlwind) ->Chicago (FunHouse) ->TV Land (The Addams Family) ->and finally the arrow points to The Twilight Zone. Seven months later Steve Ritchie added a hidden list of his games in his next machine, Star Trek: The Next Generation.

== Connections to the TV series ==
The game includes numerous references to the television series. Many are visually shown on the playfield or in the DMD animations:

- The door from the opening credits takes up most of the center of the playfield, and its sections are labeled with each of the game's modes.
- The blonde-haired artist's mannequin from the opening credits appears on the left slingshot.
- The zodiac clock from the opening credits appears as an actual, functioning clock on the playfield, which can show the current time and also act as a timer for various modes.
- An image of Henry Bemis, from the episode "Time Enough at Last", appears next to the "slot machine" cellar hole.
- The hitch-hiker from the episode of the same name appears on the playfield and in DMD animations, and one of the Door Panel awards is named after him.
- A slot machine (also known as a one-armed bandit) used in "The Fever" and "The Prime Mover" appears on the playfield, labelling a cellar hole that triggers a slot machine animation on the DMD and starts a random mode.
- The camera from "A Most Unusual Camera" is depicted in front of a cellar hole (behind the upper left flipper) that can give various awards, but shows what the next award will be before it is given.
- The tiny spacemen from "The Invaders" appear in the DMD animation for Clock Chaos, the "shoot again" prompt for an extra ball, and the match sequence.
- The radio from "Static" is referenced in the sound effects and DMD animation for the "Fast Lock" hurry-up countdown.
- The player piano from "A Piano in the House" labels a cellar hole that can start modes.
- Talky Tina from the episode "Living Doll" appears in the Extra Ball DMD animations.
- Robby the Robot, who appeared in the episodes "Uncle Simon" and "The Brain Center at Whipple's" is featured on the playfield and in a DMD animation.

Various sound effects are taken from the episodes listed above, and several quotes from Serling's voice-overs are featured, including "You unlock this door with the key of imagination" from one of the show's opening sequences, plus, "Dance with the devil, at your own risk, in the Twilight Zone" if the player tilts.

Additionally, many more Twilight Zone references appear in the backbox artwork, including:

- Masks from the episode "The Masks" are mounted on the wall immediately left of the door.
- A street sign for the 300 block of Maple Street references "The Monsters are Due on Maple Street".
- A baseball cap and jersey with the letter "Z" on both, are hanging near the door, and reference the Hoboken Zephyrs from "The Mighty Casey".
- A bomber jacket with a suicide king and a nine of hearts is hanging near the door, a reference to "King Nine Will Not Return".
- A 1964 US quarter, standing on end, is a reference to "A Penny for Your Thoughts", 1964 referencing the year the show went off the air.
- A flag for the 7th Cavalry references "The 7th Is Made Up of Phantoms".
- A life preserver with the words "Queen of Glasgow" is hanging in the upper left corner and references "Judgment Night".
- A Santa Claus stocking cap sits atop a mannequin head in the upper right corner and references "The Night of the Meek".
- Willie from the episode “The Dummy” can be seen sitting beside Rod Serling.

Two of the most prominent features of the game, the Gumball Machine and "The Power", do not appear in the TV series at all.

== Reception ==
An article in The Flipside found it to satisfy the most demanding of pinball players with its depth of gameplay, although it could be confusing for beginners.

== Digital versions ==
After a successful kickstarter to raise funding for the third party license Twilight Zone released for The Pinball Arcade for several platforms on February 5, 2013. Roger Sharpe who negotiated the license for the physical table also assisted with this. The table was delisted with the loss of the Williams license on June 30, 2018.

The table was released in Pinball FX on April 13, 2023, and includes optional additional animations.
