= Harley-Davidson pinball =

Harley-Davidson pinball may refer to:

- Harley-Davidson (Bally pinball), a pinball machine made by Midway under the Bally brand
- Harley-Davidson (Sega/Stern pinball), a pinball machine made by Sega Pinball and continued by Stern Pinball
