= Williams Pinball Controller =

Arcade system board

The Williams Pinball Controller (WPC) is an arcade system board platform used for several pinball games designed by Williams and Midway (under the Bally name) between 1990 and early 1999. It is the successor to their earlier System 11 hardware (High Speed, Pin*Bot, Black Knight 2000). It was succeeded by Williams/Midway's Pinball 2000 platform, before Williams left the pinball business in October 1999.

The WPC System was designed by Chuck Bleich, with its operating system, dubbed APPLE, developed by Larry DeMar.

FunHouse (designed by Pat Lawlor) was the first production game to use WPC, although there are prototype Dr. Dude machines that use WPC.

== Hardware info ==
WPC systems contain several separate printed circuit boards that are characterized by:

- Main CPU: Motorola 6809 at 2 MHz, 8 KB of RAM, and between 128 KB and 1 MB of EPROM for the game program
- WPC ASIC: Williams-proprietary 68-pin PLCC custom chip that implements functions like address decoding, real-time clock, and watchdog
- Sound CPU: Motorola 6809 (Pre-DCS), Analog Devices ADSP2105 (DCS)
- Sound chips (Pre-DCS): Yamaha YM2151, MP7524JN 8-bit-DAC, Harris HC55536 CVSD
- Operating system: APPLE OS (created by Williams, not related to the company Apple, but "Advanced Pinball Programming Logic Executive")

A modem was used on some of Williams test machines to download earnings and other information remotely.

== Variations ==
There are six variations of the WPC hardware. The original version is sometimes referred to as WPC-89. The WPC MPU remained the same through all generation up to the addition of the security chip in WPC-S, and then the subsequent WPC-95 board. The variations are as follows:

=== WPC (Alphanumeric) ===
- FunHouse - September 1990
- Harley-Davidson - February 1991
- The Machine: Bride of Pin·Bot - February 1991

Some Dr. Dude machines were also made using this WPC generation, although most were still made using the System 11 board.

=== WPC (Dot Matrix) ===
- Gilligan's Island - May 1991
- Terminator 2: Judgment Day - July 1991
- Hurricane - August 1991
- The Party Zone - August 1991

Terminator 2: Judgment Day was the first to be designed with a dot matrix display, but was released after Gilligan's Island, due to Terminator 2 having a longer development time than Gilligan's Island. This generation WPC hardware was also used in the SlugFest 1991 baseball card dispenser game, in the Hot Shot basketball game (designed 1991, produced 1994), as well as in the first shuffle alley game Strike Master, 1991.

=== WPC (Fliptronics) ===
- The Getaway: High Speed II - February 1992
- The Addams Family - March 1992
- Black Rose - July 1992
- Doctor Who - September 1992
- Fish Tales - October 1992
- Creature from the Black Lagoon - December 1992
- White Water - January 1993
- Bram Stoker's Dracula - March 1993
- Twilight Zone - March 1993
- The Addams Family Special Collectors Edition - October 1994

The Addams Family was the only game produced with the Fliptronics I board, which is compatible with Fliptronics II boards, which added a bridge rectifier for the flipper voltage.

=== WPC (DCS) ===
- Indiana Jones: The Pinball Adventure - August 1993
- Judge Dredd - September 1993
- Star Trek: The Next Generation - November 1993
- Popeye Saves the Earth - February 1994
- Demolition Man - February 1994

Twilight Zone was designed to be the first pinball machine to use the new DCS system, but due to delays of the new hardware design it was decided to release it on the old hardware (using downsampled sound effects) instead. The redemption game Addams Family Values also used the DCS Sound System.

=== WPC-S (Security) ===
Starting with World Cup Soccer, a security programmable integrated circuit (PIC) chip was added to the CPU board in all WPC-S games at location U22. This PIC chip was game specific making it so CPU boards could not be swapped between different models without changing the security PIC chip.

- World Cup Soccer - February 1994
- The Flintstones - July 1994
- Corvette - August 1994
- Red & Ted's Road Show - October 1994
- The Shadow - November 1994
- Dirty Harry - March 1995
- Theatre of Magic - March 1995
- No Fear: Dangerous Sports - May 1995
- Indianapolis 500 - June 1995
- Johnny Mnemonic - August 1995
- WHO Dunnit - September 1995
- Jack·Bot - October 1995

=== WPC-95 ===
In this final revision of the WPC hardware, the dot matrix controller and the DCS sound boards are combined into a single A/V Board, while the Power/Driver and the Fliptronics boards are combined into a single Power/Driver Board, bringing the board count down to three boards. It also includes the same game-specific security PIC introduced in the WPC-Security system.

- Congo - November 1995
- Attack from Mars - December 1995
- Safecracker - March 1996
- Tales of the Arabian Nights - May 1996
- Scared Stiff - September 1996
- Junk Yard - December 1996
- NBA Fastbreak - March 1997
- Medieval Madness - June 1997
- Cirqus Voltaire - October 1997
- No Good Gofers - December 1997
- The Champion Pub - April 1998
- Monster Bash - July 1998
- Cactus Canyon - October 1998

This generation WPC hardware was also used in the ticket redemption game Ticket Tac Toe, March 1996, the token payout game Phantom Haus, 1996, and the shuffle alley game League Champ, 1996.
