= Banzai Run =

1988 pinball machine

- Manufacturer: Williams
- Release date: May 1988
- System: Williams System 11B
- Design: Pat Lawlor, Larry DeMar
- Programming: Larry DeMar, Ed Boon
- Artwork: Mark Sprenger
- Mechanics: John Krutsch
- Music: Brian Schmidt
- Sound: Brian Schmidt
- Production run: 1,751

Banzai Run is a pinball machine produced by Williams in 1988, and the first machine designed by Pat Lawlor. The game is based on an earlier version called Wreck'n Ball, and uses a motocross theme. It has a duel-playfield design, in which the player can play on the near vertical backglass in addition to the main playfield. The concept was patented by Pat Lawlor and Larry DeMar, but due to cost was never used again.

== Design ==
=== Wreck'n Ball ===
While working at Nuvatech Pat Lawlor was introduced to Larry DeMar and showed him a whitewood prototype of a dual-playfield pinball game. They agreed to collaborate on this design, and DeMar obtained some components from Steve Kordek, and bought a Road Kings pinball machine to use for parts, including System 11 hardware.

Compared to a standard playfield, the near vertical playfield at an 80-degree pitch had gravity 8.5 times stronger. To experiment with vertical shots Larry DeMar used his Space Shuttle machine on its end and discovered that the maximum distance a ball could travel was about 8 inches and so all shots would have to be designed to be short ones. By the summer of 1986 the vertical playfield used a design with three flippers. The concept and layout for this game were developed to create Wreck'n Ball in 1987. This was based on a (de)construction theme and had displays inset into the middle of the vertical playfield. The prototype was viewed by two Williams executives Ken Fedesna, and Neil Nicastro, with a leading pinball designer, Steve Ritchie. Previously a software designer at Williams Larry DeMar's experience and reputation persuaded them to manufacturer a version of the game.

=== Banzai Run ===
Development moved to the Williams Electronics factory, with mechanical engineer John Krutsch adjusting the design so the backbox playfield could fold over.

Other than the theme the biggest difference between this prototype and Banzai Run is how the ball moves from the main playfield to the backbox playfield. The production version has the motor in the upper playfield and raises the ball using a corkscrew assembly. During the design stages it was called "Banzai Enduro". The voice yelling "BANZAI" is Chris Granner.

The machine only used 2 balls in play during the multiball, but contained 3 balls. The software in the machine could compensate for a lost ball to reduce the time it could otherwise have been out of order. This was the first Williams pinball machine with this feature.

This was also the first machine to use low voltage flipper buttons which could be used in attract mode without activating the flippers.

The score display is in a higher than usual location, above the near vertical playfield.

Due to the number of lights in the game certain ones on each the playfields cannot be activated when the corresponding light is lit on the other playfield.

The motocross theme was suggested by Mark Sprenger. The artwork at the top of the backbox shows a mountain rising above clouds. Most of the design team are on the playfield as names of the racers:

- 6 Schimdt
- 5 Sprenger
- 4 Boon
- 3 Lawlor
- 2 Krutsch

The game was more expensive to produce than a standard game, and released at a higher retail price.

== Layout ==
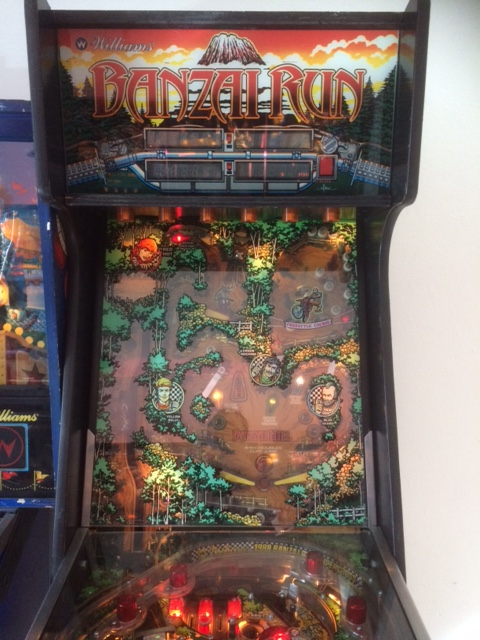
The backbox playfield

The playfield in the cabinet has 3 flippers, and a kickback mechanism in the left outlane. A long ramp loops round starting at the right side. Towards the top of the playfield are 3 bumpers with a saucer placed just above them that can be reached with a shot through the bumpers. The backbox playfield is reached using a motorized screw assembly at the top left of the main playfield.

The playfield in the backbox contains a further 3 flippers, 2 in the lower area, and a smaller flipper in the upper left "Banzai Hill" area which is reached with a specific shot from the lower area. In this area there is the Banzai Hill shot, and a captive ball. There is also a pachinko-like freestyle course in a separate upper right area where the player has no control over the smaller ball.

== Gameplay ==
The game is based on a motocross race in Tokyo (as indicated on The Twilight Zone), with the player beginning the game in 6th place. The objective is to defeat the King of the Hill.

After an attempt at a skillshot the player needs to hit various targets on the main playfield to light shots in the vertical playfield corresponding to competitors in the race - 'Green Machine', 'Yellow Belly', 'Red Hot', and 'Blue Beard'. Once lit, hitting the shot overtakes a rider, and after overtaking all four of these the player is in second place in the race. To win the race the player then needs to start the multiball, and hit the captive ball to win the race and become the new King of the Hill.

This was the first game to introduce multiball restart, where if the player loses a ball during multiball they have the chance to start multiball a second time by hitting a shot (which for this machine is the saucer). The game does not have a bonus multiplier.

== Reception ==
The game was tested at an arcade in Rockford, Illinois set at 50¢ per game, twice that of other pinball games. In test locations it earned more money at 50¢ per game than at 25¢. The game cost operators more to maintain, and sales were subdued.

Pinball Trader called the theme song a musical masterpiece. The design was called radical, but "not what the future of pinball will look like", rating the game at 8/10.

Pinball Player found the horizontal playfield to be nothing special, but saved by the innovative vertical playfield. The yell of "Ban-Zai!" when making a cliff jump was found to be repetitive.

== Digital versions ==
Banzai Run was released for The Pinball Arcade in March 2018, but delisted on June 30, 2018, due to the loss of the WMS license.

It was released alongside Black Knight 2000 and Earthshaker! for Pinball FX on December 12, 2024.
