= Indianapolis 500 (pinball) =

1995 pinball machine

- Manufacturer: Midway
- Release date: June 1995
- System: Williams WPC Security (WPC-S)
- Design: Dennis Nordman
- Programming: Mike Boon, Craig Sylla
- Artwork: Dan Hughes, Paul Barker
- Music: Chris Granner
- Production run: 2,249 units

Indianapolis 500 is a pinball machine designed by Dennis Nordman and produced by Midway (under the Bally brand name) released in June 1995. It is based on the sporting event of the same name.

== Design ==
The designer initially had trouble deciding what features to include, but knew he wanted to emphasize speed. The turbo multi-ball and the spinning car evolved as ways to show this.

The game includes a shaker motor.

The game introduced an improved version of jumper bumpers.

The three voices in the game are commentators Paul Page (longtime "Voice of the '500'"), and three-time Indy 500 winner Bobby Unser, and the announcer Tom Carnegie, who was a legend at the Indianapolis Motor Speedway for 50 years.

Williams vice-president Joe Dillon said the game was "geared for aficionados" rather than the more general player.

== Layout and gameplay ==
This game has no sink-holes and many targets and is one of the first pinball machines to feature light up targets. Such an object is a square plastic target, that is a little larger than one of the RIVER targets in White Water, or the REPAIR targets in Doctor Who and divided into four quadrants. Each quadrant can light up. The targets are completed if they are hit 4 times.

== Reception ==
In a retrospective review of pinball machines released in 1995, Kineticist found it to be the 4th best machine of the year, and possibly Dennis Nordman's best game.

== Digital versions ==
Indianapolis 500 was available as a licensed table of The Pinball Arcade for several platforms from July 1, 2016, to June 30, 2018.
