= Demolition Man (pinball) =

1994 pinball machine

- Manufacturer: Williams
- Release date: February 1994
- System: Williams WPC (DCS)
- Design: Dennis Nordman
- Programming: Ted Estes, Bill Grupp
- Artwork: Doug Watson, Linda Deal (backglass)
- Mechanics: Win Schilling, Armando Zuniga
- Music: Jon Hey
- Sound: Jon Hey
- Voices: Sylvester Stallone (John Spartan); Wesley Snipes (Simon Phoenix); Sandra Bullock (Lenina Huxley)
- Production run: 7,019

Demolition Man is a Williams pinball machine released in February 1994. It is based on the motion picture of the same name. It is part of WMS' SuperPin line of widebody games.

Sylvester Stallone (John Spartan) and Wesley Snipes (Simon Phoenix) provided custom speech for this game during ADR sessions at Warner Brothers Studios in Los Angeles under the direction of Jon Hey. Hey scored the music of the pinball game in part based upon the movie score by Elliot Goldenthal, but including new music.

In addition to the two standard flipper buttons, the cabinet has a pair of gun handles protruding upward above them. These handles have trigger buttons that can be used to control the flippers, and a smaller pair of thumb buttons that can award bonuses under certain circumstances when pressed.

== Multiball modes ==
This game is centered on multiball modes. After hitting the five yellow standup targets a set number of times, the player can hit the right inlane to light "Quick Freeze" on the left ramp, then shoot the ramp to light one of the four Freeze lamps in the center of the playfield. Once the required number of balls have been frozen, a shot to the left loop will start multiball, putting one additional ball into play for every freeze earned.

- Fortress Multiball (1 freeze required) - A normal multiball mode in which the player must hit a set number of lit jackpot shots in sequence to enable the Super Jackpot.
- Museum Multiball (2 freezes required) - Every shot is lit for a jackpot; once they are all hit, the Super Jackpot lights up.
- Wasteland Multiball (3 freezes required) - Similar to Fortress, but more than one jackpot can be lit at a time.
- Cryoprison Multiball (4 freezes required) - The Super Jackpot is immediately lit; all jackpot shots add to it.

The four modes are always played in this order. For all except Cryoprison, the player can increase the starting jackpot value by freezing additional balls before starting the mode.

Completing all four multiball modes lights a "Demolition Jackpot" at the right ramp, which is calculated based on the number and value of the jackpots scored during every mode. This award goes out of play if the ball drains, or if another multiball is started.

The Museum Multiball music is based upon Brahms' Second Symphony, 2nd Movement.

== Cryo-Claw modes ==
The game's other main feature is the Cryo-Claw, which is located on the upper-left side of the playfield. Completing all three rollover lanes above the jet bumpers lights the left inlane, which in turn lights the right ramp for a shot to the Cryo-Claw. The ball is lifted off the field, picked up by a magnet on the end of a pivoting arm, and swung over five exit lanes arranged in an arc. Each lane corresponds to a different award; the player moves the claw with the triggers, then must press both of them to drop the ball into the lane for the desired award.

The awards are as follows:

- Start AcMag - Hit the center to score extra points for a limited time.
- Lock Freeze - Freezes enough balls to start the next multiball, or starts it immediately with one additional ball if the required number have already been frozen.
- Prison Break - Awards a point bonus, which can be increased by immediately making either of two lit shots. "Car Chase" is also enabled, awarding points for alternating left/right ramp shots.
- Super Jets - Bumpers award 1 million points per hit for 25 hits; hits to the yellow standup targets extend the count.
- Capture Simon - Shoot three lit arrows to collect a bonus.

Completing all of the Cryo-Claw modes lights the Underground shot for the wizard mode, Demolition Time. Three balls are launched into play, and all major shots are lit to award points. Hitting the five standup targets increases the shot value and launches another ball, to a maximum of five. Each lost ball decreases the shot value.

== Film ==
Sylvester Stallone, Wesley Snipes, and Benjamin Bratt, three of the film's stars, each received a Demolition Man pinball machine as a gift; a fourth star, Sandra Bullock, did not. Marco Brambilla, director of the film, also owns one of the machines.
