= No Good Gofers =

1997 pinball machine

- No Good Gofers flyer
- Manufacturer: Williams
- Release date: December 1997
- System: WPC-95
- Design: Pat Lawlor
- Programming: Louis Koziarz
- Artwork: John Youssi
- Mechanics: John Krutsch
- Sound: Vince Pontarelli
- Voices: Vince Pontarelli (Buzz); Jon Hey (Bud)
- Animation: Adam Rhine
- Production run: 2,711

No Good Gofers is a Williams pinball machine released in December 1997. It was Pat Lawlor's last released game for Williams, although he also designed Wizard Blocks. The game is set on a golf course, with two gophers attempting to get golfers to leave.

== Design ==
The game involves completing a 9 hole golf course while two gophers try and thwart the players efforts. The artwork shows the title as No Good Go~~l~~fers (with an explosion triggered by the gophers destroying the letter "L") showing the duality of the name - from the players perspective it is "No Good Gophers", and from the gophers perspective it is "No Good Golfers" as they are attempting to get the golfers to leave.

The first 15 prototype games included a Newton ball mechanism for a multiball, but after problems with it, was removed before production started.

Vince Pontarelli recorded the voice for Buzz, and Jon Hey recorded the voice for Bud; this was recorded on August 17, 1997. Some of the voices were performed by members of The Second City group.

The software use to make the gofers talk is a module called the Babbler used in several games starting with FunHouse. This could randomly select audio lines to play, but exclude those recently played. Different mouth images for the gofers were used depending on what was being said.

The spinning disc with a series of awards uses optical flags underneath it to detect the position it stops in.

A late change to the game added a flag (numbered 18) by the hole-in-one sinkhole; this was suggested by vice president of Williams, Ken Fedesna, and the design team called it the Fedesna flag.

This game was referenced in a callout in Pat Lawlor's first game for Jersey Jack Pinball, Dialed In!.

=== Boss Gofer ===
An idea of the spinning disc raising up to reveal a "Boss Gofer" that spoke in various languages was conceived of to show on the website for this game, and a low resolution image of a whitewood was created with an image photoshopped onto it as a red herring; a higher resolution image never existed, and clicking to see it always lead to a 404 error message. This is based on a concept drawing by George Gomez in one of Louis Koziarz notebooks.

playfield

== Layout ==
The game include two in-lanes on the left, with a kickback mechanism in the left outlane. Above these in an elongated triangle formation are three bumpers and a kickout mechanism that can hit a target on the other side of the playfield. Unlike on some of Pat Lawlor's games there is no shot through these bumpers. On either side of the playfield is a lane with a spinner in it. Nearing the centre of the playfield is a captive ball, and just to the right of this is the slam ramp. This game is the first time a ramp of the type was used, and a patent was granted. There is a very small elevated playfield with a sinkhole, and a difficult shot using this ramp is the only way to reach it. There are two adjacent ramps, the entrances to each which can pop up to reveal one of the gophers, called Buzz and Bud; these can be used as targets. On the right of the machine is an upper flipper which is used to hit the cross-ramp facing it; just below this are five spot targets, four of which spell K-I-C-K. In the middle of the playfield, but towards the right side is a large spinning disc. On the other side of the machine, below the bumpers is a "sand trap" hole which fires the ball to the KICK targets. Towards the back of the machine is the main sinkhole which often represents putting the golf ball. Just above the flippers are a series of square lights representing the bonus multiplier, and just above these are 9 more lights indicating which hole is being played.

== Gameplay ==
pop-up gophers, Bud (left) & Buzz (right)

The main objective in this game is to complete a 9 hole round of golf. The player achieves this by hitting a variety of lit shots, and then 'putting' the ball in the sinkhole; at times an alternative way to put the ball is by hitting the slam ramp when it is down and getting the ball in the hole-in-one sinkhole. Each time a hole is completed the award shown on the spinning disc is given. After the 7th hole, Buzz gnaws on wires of the machine starting the "short circuit" mode where the player needs to distract and then hit Buzz. After the 9th hole the "hole in one challenge" multiball wizard mode begins where an objective is to hit a hole in one using the slam ramp. After this the "back 9" holes can be played which are similar to the first 9 but require more shots to be hit.

Another feature is the main multiball which is started by hitting the two main ramps and the gophers that pop-up, followed by the holes behind them. There are also a variety of side modes, one of these uses a version of the Chicken Dance.

Throughout the game the gophers taunt the player. There is a setting in the game called "gofer attitude" which adjusts the gofer callouts; by default this is set to "very rude", with the other setting simply called "rude".

At the end of a ball the bonus count is tallied using the players scoresheet for their round of golf holes.

At the end of the game the match sequence uses a bouncing golf ball.

== Reception ==
The game was shown at the Amusement Showcase International 98 distributors event in March 1998. During a presentation by Williams at that event, operator demand for pinball was stated to be low, and this was described as a short-term game to fill the gap until some innovative machines would be released, and to try and stimulate operator demand, flyers were "sent to thousands of driving ranges and miniature golf courses" across the United States. These were different to the standard flyer for the machine, and titled "Pinball hits the links with No Good Gofers". As a further sign of a declining market, it sold fewer games than another golf-themed pinball table, Tee'd Off which was released four years earlier by Gottlieb.

== Digital versions ==
No Good Gofers developed by Farsight Studios for the PlayStation 3 version of Pinball Hall of Fame: The Williams Collection (called Williams Pinball Classics in some parts of the world) and released in 2009.

The same developers released it for The Pinball Arcade from October 30, 2012, but was delisted on June 30, 2018 due to the WMS license expiration.

Zen Studios released No Good Gofers for Pinball FX3 as part of Williams volume 5 on December 10, 2019, and included additional animations. A remastered version was released for Pinball FX in 2022.

== Conversions ==
=== Mega Golf Ball Frenzy ===
Starting in 2004 three squirrels, Earl, Mearle, and Pearl were created for a series of online games to promote the EDS Byron Nelson Championship golf tournament. In 2006 it was decided by Mike Minchew that the online game would be pinball, and once it was discovered how popular it was then there were 10 weeks to retheme an existing pinball machine. After talking to Gary Stern, it was decided to use No Good Gofers. The playfield remained essentially unchanged, but with new plastics. The cabinet and backbox art were all new and featured Earl, Mearle, and Pearl. Three machines were produced before the tournament, with sufficient decals and translites for another 10. The first of these Mega Golf Ball Frenzy machines had the translite signed by Byron Nelson and placed in the locker room for golfers to play it and sign it. After it had 100 signatures it was auctioned on eBay to raise funds.

The following year a single Ultimate Golf Ball Frenzy was produced with different artwork. This was signed by 130 PGA tour golfers and sold for $45,000.

=== No Good Gofers: Battle for the Green ===
An upgrade kit was released by Cardona pinball in small quantities in 2023 which uses a new display, and computer with completely new software. This involves playing an 18 hole golf course. Buzz is still a gopher, but unlike the original Bud is a wandering bear who has forgotten he is a bear who Buzz has convinced he is actually a gopher. The rest of the game involves Buzz's plan to get rid of the golfers and reclaim the course.
