= The Addams Family (pinball) =

1991 pinball machine

- Manufacturer: Midway
- Release date: March 1992
- System: Midway WPC (Fliptronics I)
- Design: Pat Lawlor, Larry DeMar
- Programming: Larry DeMar, Mike Boon
- Artwork: John Youssi
- Mechanics: John Krutsch
- Music: Chris Granner
- Sound: Chris Granner
- Voices: Raul Julia (Gomez); Anjelica Huston (Morticia)
- Animation: Scott Slomiany
- Production run: 20,270 (standard); 1,000 (special collectors edition)

The Addams Family is a pinball machine released in March 1992. It was designed by Pat Lawlor and Larry DeMar and released by Midway (under the Bally label). It was based on the 1991 film of the same name, and features speech (taken from the film) by Anjelica Huston and custom speech specifically recorded for the game by Raul Julia. It is the best-selling solid state pinball machine of all time with 20,270 units sold.

== Background ==
Negotiations for the license initially began between the developers of the film, Orion, and Roger Sharpe at Williams. They were concluded with Paramount who took over completion of the film when production costs rose. Some, including Pat Lawlor, had reservations about obtaining the license after Orion got into financial difficulties.

At a lunch with Ken Fedesna, general manager of Williams Electronics, Pat Lawlor learned that the license had been secured. He quickly went to Roger Sharpe and said his favorite television show when he was young was The Addams Family and requested to be the designer for this game.

Early development for the game began with an alpha-numeric display as the design team initially thought the extra $100 cost for a dot matrix display (DMD) could be better spent on the playfield; when the new capabilities of a DMD soon became clear with Terminator 2 this was incorporated into the design of The Addams Family. At the start of development the idea to use a dolls house design complete with furniture in the backbox was conceived, but abandoned due to cost. The game uses a version of the backbox used in earlier Williams game, but is its first use on a Bally game. The cloud topper is based on a scene in the script of the movie, but cut from the final version. The design team of the game attended the opening of the movie in Hollywood.

During production of the game, the performance of Raul Julia was noted as being particularly good by the sound designer, Chris Granner. Anjelica Huston insisted her nose was redrawn on the backglass from an early version, so the artist John Youssi flew to California to draw a sketch and obtain approval.

The game was launched at a sound stage at Paramount Pictures. Pat Lawlor and other members of the design team went on a radio show hosted by Rick Dees. A live broadcast included members of the cast of the film, producer Scott Rudin, and MC Hammer.

=== Foreshadowing ===
The game was unintentionally foreshadowed on a 1982 Bally pinball machine called Vector. The artist, Greg Freres, showed the seven members of The Addams Family from the 1964 television series on a plastic.

== Overview ==
The machine's game card describes the game objective as being to "Explore the strange world of the Addams Family". With that in mind there is no single player goal, though there are two central objectives:

- Tour the Mansion: The Addams Family mansion is located in the center of the playfield and has 12 rooms, each of which offers a different award. Once every award is collected, a "wizard mode" called Tour the Mansion becomes available (see below).
- Vault Multiball: In the top-right section of the playfield is a blue bookcase, representing the bookcase that Gomez shows Uncle Fester in the movie, hiding the entrance to the family vault. Hits to the bookcase award letters in the word GREED; once the word is completed, the bookcase turns to expose the vault entrance. A shot to the vault locks the ball for future multiball play, or starts multiball if two balls have been previously locked. The bookcase opens for certain other modes of play as well. If a ball enters the vault while the bookcase is still closed, it immediately opens and the player is credited with locking the ball.

Other lesser objectives include:

- Bear Kicks: a ramp in the top center of the playfield awards "bear kicks" (referencing the movie scene in which a bearskin rug comes to life), awarding points or mansion rooms and lighting extra balls. Under certain circumstances, a shot to this ramp triggers
- Thing Flips, in which the machine takes control of the upper left flipper and tries to shoot the ball into the Swamp sinkhole at center right for extra points. When calibrated the success rate of this shot is 50-60%. Full calibration of this shot takes the game several hundred shots, but after 30 attempts it has a success rate of over 40%. This is the first pinball game with this type of feature; a similar feature was used on Monster Bash in 1998.
- Staircase Ramp: a left-side ramp that awards an increasing number of millions, starting at 1 million on each new ball, and letters in the word "THING" (see THING below). The ramp can also award a star if hit immediately after shooting the left loop; up to two stars can be lit at any time.
- Graveyard: a set of five bumpers that increases the Graveyard Value, which is collected from the Swamp. The value resets to 1 million at the start of each ball and can reach a maximum of 4 million.
- Train Wreck: a dead-end shot in the top-left section that awards points. As the player reaches set threshold numbers of hits, larger values are awarded, the Graveyard Value is held over to the next ball, and extra balls can be lit.
- GRAVE: Five targets strewn around the field that award letters in the word "Grave", advancing the bumper values and awarding an increasing number of millions when completed.
- THING: Once the word THING is completed (see Staircase Ramp above), a scoop in the top center awards a bonus, plus additional points for any lit stars.
- Skill Shot: When initially launching the ball, dropping it into the saucer in front of Thing's box just past the launch ramp awards points, starting at 2 million and increasing by 1 million per successful shot to a maximum of 5 million. A successful skill shot also collects any other benefits or awards currently lit at Thing's scoop (e.g. extra ball, Quick Multiball, THING award, locking a ball for multiball).

An electric chair is positioned above a sinkhole at the center of the playfield. At the beginning of each ball, it is lit and will award the currently flashing mansion room (rotated by the bumpers) if hit. The player must then shoot either ramp to relight the chair. The Swamp kickout hole will also award the flashing room if it is shot while the chair is lit.

Mounted beneath the central portion of the playfield is "The Power", a set of spinning magnets that can alter the path of the ball. Flashing lights in this area indicate when the Power is active.

Topper

The game includes a topper which extends the design of the mansion on the backglass into a cloud, and is lit by flashers to simulate lightning.

== Rules summary ==
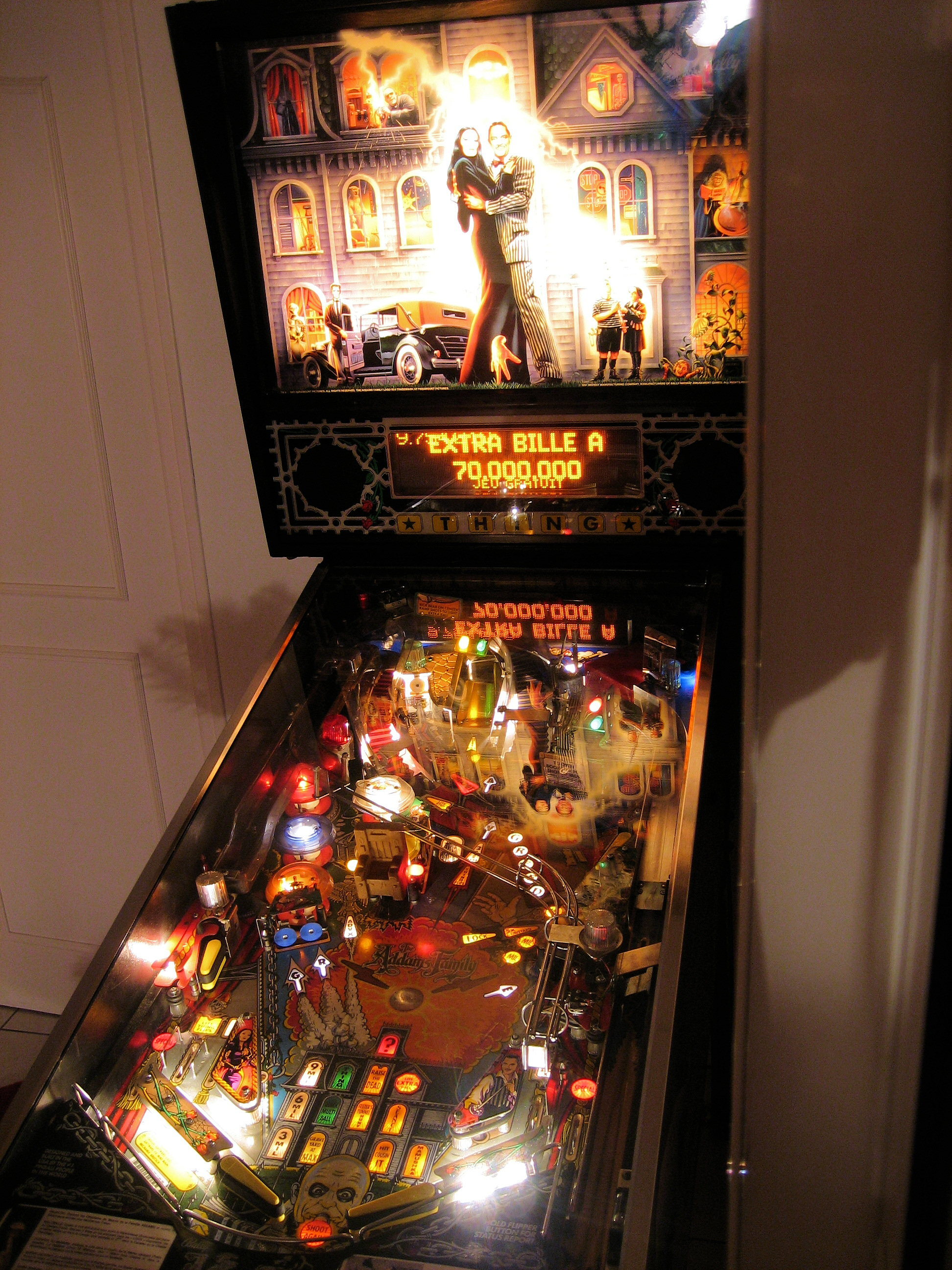

=== Mansion ===
Mansion rooms are awarded by shooting the electric chair when lit, shooting the Swamp kickout hole while the chair is lit, or by reaching set threshold numbers of bear kicks. Once a mansion room is awarded, the electric chair light goes out until it is relit permanently by a shot to either ramp, or temporarily by hitting the right inlane. The chair is lit/relit at the start of each ball, and the flashing room is rotated by hitting the jet bumpers. Mansion room scoring modes can run simultaneously.

The awards are:

- 3 Million, 6 Million, 9 Million: Separate rooms that award that many points. On normal difficulty settings, collecting either the 3 Million or 6 Million award immediately spots the other one as well.
- Graveyard at Max: Advances all five jet bumpers to their maximum value (30,000 added to the Graveyard Value per hit).
- The Mamushka: Adds 1 million to the end-of-ball bonus, plus 250,000 for every switch the player hits in 20 seconds.
- Hit Cousin It: Adds 1 million to the end-of-ball bonus, plus 200,000 for every switch the player hits in 20 seconds. Each hit to the Cousin It target behind the electric chair adds 2 million and increases the per-switch value by 50,000.
- Quick Multiball: Lights "Quick Multiball", allowing the player to start a two-ball multiball by shooting Thing's scoop. The vault opens, awarding a value that starts at 5 million and increases by 1 million every time it is collected or the center ramp is shot, to a maximum of 10 million.
- Fester's Tunnel Hunt: Awards 5, 10, and 15 million points for hitting the swamp, electric chair and vault. This round ends after 20 seconds or once all three shots have been made, whichever comes first.
- Seance: Awards 5, 10, and 15 million points for each shot to either ramp. This round ends after 20 seconds or three ramp shots, whichever comes first. "The Power" magnets are activated during this mode, and any shots to the center ramp are diverted down the left one.
- Get Ball to Thing: A "hurry-up" mode with a point value decreasing from 15 million to 3 million. If the player shoots Thing's scoop before it times out, the remaining points are awarded and a two-ball multiball begins, with shots to the vault awarding the same value again.
- Raise the Dead: Adds 2 million to the end-of-ball bonus, plus 100,000 for each bumper hit, or 3 million for hitting a bumper four times. The round ends after 30 seconds or once all five bumpers are hit four times each, whichever comes first.
- Lite Extra Ball: The extra ball becomes available at Thing's scoop. If a player earns a total of five extra balls during a single game, each one thereafter awards a score bonus.

Mansion rooms cannot be collected/spotted during any multiball, or after the player has locked two balls for Vault Multiball. However, if any timed modes are in progress when a multiball is started, they will continue normally.

Once all mansion rooms have been collected, the chair immediately relights and will start the game's "wizard mode" (indicated by the flashing "?" in the uppermost room) the next time it is hit.

- Tour the Mansion: Awards the player 50 million points, lights the extra ball, lights the "special" (free game) on the outlanes, maximizes the five jet bumpers, and starts each of the six timed modes automatically, one after the other. After the last mode, the player will not be able to collect any more Mansion Rooms until the start of the next ball; losing the current ball during Tour the Mansion immediately ends it.

=== Vault Multiball ===
The player can add letters to the word "GREED" by hitting the bookcase in front of the vault. Spelling "GREED" opens the bookcase, revealing a shot into the vault that can be used to "lock" (hold) balls for multiball; for the first multiball, Thing's scoop can be used to lock the first two balls and the second one can be locked in the swamp. The Power turns on for the player's attempt to lock the third and final ball. Multiball can be started from the vault or, for the first multiball, the electric chair.

Once multiball begins, the Power remains active and the Train Wreck shot lights up for a Jackpot. The Staircase Ramp lights up for a Super Jackpot (Double on the first multiball, Triple on all others). The Jackpot starts out at 10 million, and increases by 1 million for every Bear Kicks shot or shot to a closed vault during the multiball (to a maximum of 25 million). After either jackpot is scored, the vault re-opens, and a successful shot to it re-lights only the Staircase Ramp. The player may continue to do this as long as two or more balls are in play.

If two balls drain without any jackpot being scored, the player is given 20 seconds to shoot Thing's scoop and restart multiball, but with two balls instead of three. The jackpot resumes its previous value, and another restart chance is not given if the player fails to score a jackpot before one ball drains.

== Special Collectors Edition ==
In October 1994, Bally produced a "Special Collectors Edition", often referred to as The Addams Family Gold. Towards the end of the original production run of The Addams Family, some machines were produced with golden features to celebrate the game's sales record. The "Special Collectors Edition" similarly featured specially designed gold accents on the playfield/cabinet and an updated software program. An "extra ball" buy-in button was added to the front of the cabinet where a player could spend a credit for an additional ball in the same game if the setting to allow it had been selected by the operator/owner.

The game also included some play enhancements, as noted below:

- The "Seance" Mansion Award could randomly be designated as "Super Seance", with ramp values increased to 10/15/20 million.
- Some rooms would randomly award an item belonging to Cousin It, such as his hat or car keys, and a bonus consisting of points, a lit extra ball, or a lit special. The item was given in addition to the award for the flashing room.
- The 3 Million room not only awarded the points, but allowed the player to travel through "Pugsley and Wednesday's Trap Door" to receive a second Mansion Award, chosen at random from any not yet collected. If the player had already earned all of the other Mansion Awards, one would be chosen at random and given again.
- The 3 Million and 6 Million rooms were decoupled from one another and had to be earned separately.
- New quotes and dot matrix graphics were added.

Only one thousand machines of the Special Collectors Edition were ever produced, each carrying the number (0001-1000) on a plaque below the coin door. 1,000 orders were received before the game was produced, with Pat Lawlor retaining number one for himself, and Larry DeMar receiving number two. A certificate with the corresponding number and the signatures of production and development team members was also unique for this edition.

== Hidden game codes ==
The Addams Family pinball contains two known Easter eggs—plus a third egg in the Special Collectors Edition—each of which can be accessed using a flipper and Start button code sequence specific to each egg. The results produced are cosmetic in nature only; they do not modify actual game play in any way.

The codes work only under the following conditions: The machine must be in its Attract or "game over" mode (no game currently in progress). There must also be no credits on the machine. The Start button cannot be flashing to begin a new game; consequently, the codes will never work if the machine is set for free play.

The available Easter eggs and how to activate them:

- "When Cows Fight": This is a dot-matrix still that appears on the display for about three seconds; this image includes DOHO, a reference to Dorris Ho, the wife of Scott Slomiany, the animator for this machine. Press the left flipper button 7 times, start once, right flipper button 14 times, start once, left button 20 times and start once.
- "When Cows Dig for Gold" (collectors edition only): Press the left button 12 times, Start button once, right button 5 times, start once, left 4 times and start once.
- Design credits: Press the left button 13 times, start button once, right once, start once, left 2 times and start once.

When the theme music is played at the end of a game or in attract mode some of the time at random the flippers flip in time to the end of the chorus.

== Aftermarket modifications ==
Some aftermarket modifications may be found in some machines:

- A ColorDMD full color display that replaces the original orange DMD.
- An Uncle Fester model sitting in the electric chair. He has a light bulb in his mouth replacing the light on the left side of the chair.
- A white bear above the base of the central staircase ramp where one shoots for bear kicks.
- A bronze colored vault on top of the vault shot hole.
- A Cousin It model above the Cousin It targets. This modification may trap balls.
- A bronze colored train near the train shot.
- A bronze colored phone near Thing's box.
- A bronze colored suit of armor in the back center.
- A miniature Tiffany-style lamp near Thing's box.

== Reception ==
The design team knew the game would be a winner when Larry DeMar went to service a machine at a test location, and couldn't get past the queue waiting to play.

flipper used for 'Thing flips' feature, with electric chair

The game won the award for the most played pinball machine for 1992 at the AMOA awards, the fourth Pat Lawlor machine to win an award there after Earthshaker!, Whirlwind, and FunHouse. It also won the award for best innovation for Larry DeMar's Thing Flips. At the 1993 AMOA awards it again won most played pinball machine for that year. The game won further awards up to 1997.

In Play Meter's monthly equipment poll it first appeared at no. 1 for pinball in April 1992, a position it held for a total of at least 16 (non-consecutive) months, with the last in December 1995. It remained on this chart for a record 17 years, and by January 2002 had the highest number of longevity points of any pinball machine.

In a retro review in 2022 for Pinball Mag, the gameplay was highly praised, and the game was called a "world under glass". The sound and call-outs were also praised; the animations on the DMD were noted as not as good as on some other contemporary pinball machines such as Creature from the Black Lagoon. Found not to be as deep a game as more recent games, in the context of 1992 games its commercial success was understood.

== Legacy ==
The Addams Family was the first game to have a series of modes which are played before a wizard mode. Almost all subsequently released pinball machines included a wizard mode.

In a 2022 Wired article its continued popularity with collectors was noted.

== Digital versions ==
A version of this table was in development for the Nintendo 64 and was developed by Digital Eclipse to be published by GT Interactive, but was cancelled.

The game is also supported by Visual Pinball, which can also be made by some people to play through a home made pinball cabinet, like the original but digitally emulated.

In July 2014, FarSight Studios released The Pinball Arcade Newsletter 29 indicating they "agreed upon terms with all of the major licenses and clearances" needed to digitally recreate this table. A Kickstarter to raise the $97,640 needed for licensing was initiated on September 12, and successfully funded $115,276 on its closing date of October 12.

FarSight Studios released their digitized version of the table in February 2015 as part of the Season Four package of The Pinball Arcade on iOS, Android, Amazon, Steam (PC & Mac) and OUYA. The images of Christopher Lloyd (Uncle Fester) and Jimmy Workman (Pugsley) were altered in this version due to licensing issues. The "Special Collectors Gold Edition" was one of the rewards for those who pledged over $100 during the Kickstarter campaign. The table was delisted on June 30, 2018, due to losing the WMS license.

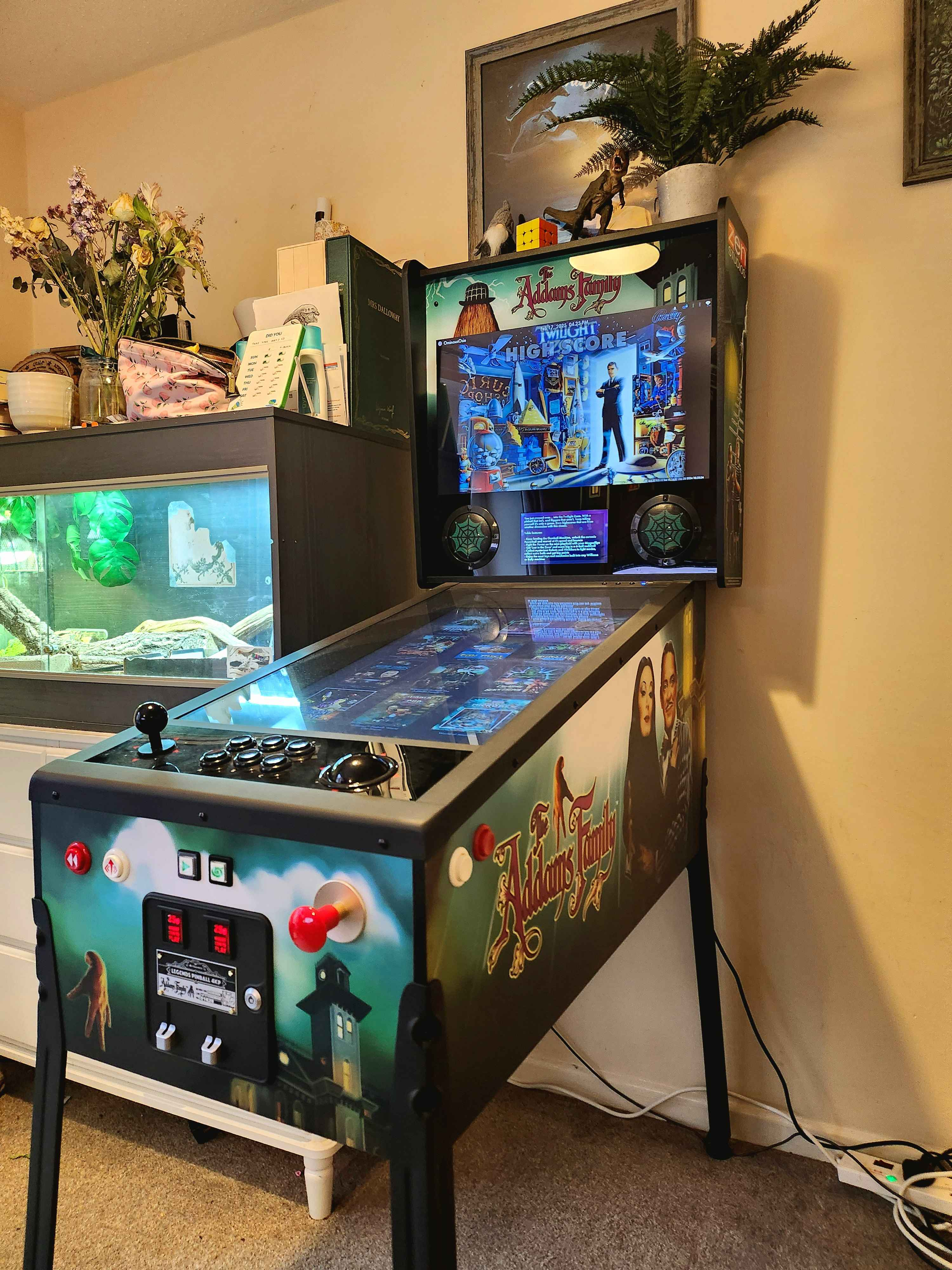
AtGames FX Legends 4KP - The Addams Family

Zen Studios released a version of the table on February 16, 2023 as part of the launch (after an early access period) of Pinball FX on PlayStation, Xbox and Epic Games Store, with a Steam release following on April 13, 2023 and subsequent releases on Switch and mobile platforms. This too was with altered images of Christopher Lloyd and Jimmy Workman.

ATGames released a range of Legends pinball 4K cabinets, one of which features The Addams Family, but with different cabinet artwork to the original table. This was first shown to the public at the Pinball Expo 2023.

== Redemption game ==
A year after the release of this table, in 1993, a redemption game was released based on Addams Family Values. This uses the same DCS sound system as on other 1993 pinball tables, and on its advertising flyer noted the success of The Addams Family pinball.
