= Pat Lawlor =

Video game and pinball designer

- Born: November 30, 1951 (age 74)
- Occupation: Pinball designer
- Employers: Williams; Stern; Jersey Jack Pinball
- Notable work: The Addams Family; Twilight Zone

Patrick M. Lawlor (born November 30, 1951) is a video game and pinball machine designer.

As a child Lawlor played pinball with dimes his father gave him during his job of distributing beer to local bars. In his senior year as a college student in Minnesota he had a pinball machine in his apartment; during his time there he took programming courses, including Fortran. After briefly working as a disc jockey he worked as a service manager at an auto center for eight years. After quitting this job he became proficient with BASIC and 6502 assembly language.

Pat Lawlor entered the coin-operated game design industry in 1980, working for Dave Nutting Associates, continuing video game programming until 1983. During this period he worked on the unreleased 1982 game Demons & Dragons.

After some freelance programming he worked for Nuvatech, programming pin setters for Brunswick bowling centers. While working at Nuvatech Lawlor met a fellow employee, Paul Dussault who had previously worked at Williams. Dussault brought Larry DeMar to Nuvatech to offer a commission working on programming video for Brunswick's system; and introduced him to Lawlor. Lawlor then told DeMar of a design of a dual-playfield pinball machine and showed him a whitewood prototype in his home.

Lawlor and DeMar agreed to co-create a pinball machine independently from any manufacturer. DeMar obtained some components from Steve Kordek, and bought a Road Kings pinball machine to use for parts. Development continued until a prototype of a complete game called Wreck'n Ball was completed in 1987 and presented to Williams. After around four months of negotiations Williams agreed to fund completion of the design. The game was rethemed to motorcycle racing and released as Banzai Run in May 1988.

In 1988, he was assigned his first individual design project, a machine entitled Earthshaker!, which was released in January 1989. Notably, Earthshaker! was the first pinball machine with a shaker motor.

== Early games ==
Lawlor's first solo project, Earthshaker!, was noteworthy for its implementation of a relatively obscure theme (earthquakes). The follow-up to Earthshaker! tackled a different form of natural disaster: tornadoes. The new game, Whirlwind, was released in early 1990 to similar praise. Both games demonstrated components of Lawlor's design methodology.

Foremost, Lawlor introduced thematically appropriate elements that altered gameplay. For instance, upon progressing toward multiball mode in Earthshaker!, the playfield vibrated to simulate the effect of an earthquake. In a similar mode in Whirlwind, rubberized disks set flush in the playfield spun rapidly back and forth to throw the ball off course as it passed over them, while an electric fan mounted on top of the backbox blew wind in the player's face.

Secondly, Lawlor created playfields that were especially crowded compared to the faster flow-oriented machines that were popular at the time. Lawlor also introduced his signature "bumper shot", in which players needed to shoot the ball between pop bumpers—a tricky shot that requires great precision. Also, critical shots in Earthshaker! and Whirlwind were obstructed when attempted from the lower flippers; they could only be hit directly from a third flipper, located near the middle of the playfield on one side, requiring that players develop acuity at sending the ball across the playfield rather than simply up the playfield. Thus, his style of gameplay has often been described by players as "stop and go". Whirlwind was among the first pinball machines to feature what became known as a "wizard mode", a final special mode accessed by particularly skilled players for completing numerous difficult tasks on the playfield, a reward that was imitated in many future designs. "Wizard modes" were important in giving pinball games a sense of progression absent from pinball in its earlier years.

Lawlor followed up Whirlwind with FunHouse, which released in November 1990. FunHouse was a carnival-oriented game which bore the trademark playfield elements established in Earthshaker! and Whirlwind, plus a unique talking head named "Rudy" (voiced by Ed Boon). More than 10,000 FunHouse machines were produced.

== Other releases from the 1990s ==
=== The Addams Family ===
Lawlor's next design went on to become the best-selling pinball of all time. The Addams Family was released in March 1992 by Midway (under the Bally label) and ultimately sold 20,270 units. The Addams Family was the first time Lawlor developed a game around a licensed theme rather than an original concept.

The Addams Family included several new features. One of these was "Thing Flips," in which the game could automatically take control of one flipper under certain circumstances and attempt to make a particularly difficult shot for the player. Results of previous shots were used to adjust the timing of the flip for each new attempt. Lawlor also placed magnets under the playfield that were activated during multiball and other modes, adding tension and randomness to the gameplay. In 1994, a limited-edition Gold version was produced to commemorate the record-breaking sales of the original. The Addams Family Gold featured minor rule modifications, as well as cosmetic enhancements such as a gold lockbar and gold-trimmed rails.

=== Twilight Zone ===
His next design (over which he was given complete creative control) was another licensed theme based on a popular television show: The Twilight Zone. While Twilight Zone sold fewer units than The Addams Family (although it did sell over 15,000 units) it is popular amongst pinball enthusiasts, due in part to its complicated ruleset.

Its complexity was a mixed blessing, highlighting many of the pitfalls of the coin-operated game industry in general and pinball in particular. That is, the more elaborate the game, the more likely it would overwhelm the average player, which in turn would hurt sales. Furthermore, Twilight Zone was expensive to produce, particularly in the massive quantities that were expected following the astronomical record sales of The Addams Family. Lawlor was well aware of the difficulties the project posed, as he told an audience at a trade show in 2003. "We had a nickname for Twilight Zone," he said, "and it was 'In Excess Pinball'...we had just gotten done setting the record with Addams Family, and [Williams executives] were willing to let us do anything, and we did, which was a big mistake." While he conceded that "extreme pinball players" would enjoy the game, he added that "from a commercial standpoint, we were out of control...nobody would be allowed to do something that complicated again; nor should they be."

Among its toys was an elevated, magnetic flipperless mini-playfield; the player pressed the flipper buttons to activate the magnets, driving the ball into switches on the walls and through a scoring hole at the top. The game also featured a gumball machine, which could be loaded by the player and which could dispense a ball into play. This machine was also connected to another new feature, the "Powerball" — a white ceramic ball which was lighter than the others and unaffected by the game's magnets. A fully operational, 12-hour analogue clock served as a timer for several modes and could also display the current time.

=== Red & Ted's Road Show ===
After the release of Steve Ritchie's Star Trek: The Next Generation machine in late 1993, the fortunes of the pinball industry began to decline as the coin-operated arcade industry faltered in the face of increasingly advanced home video game systems. 1994 saw the release of Red & Ted's Road Show, a game that paid homage in many respects to The Addams Family and Twilight Zone while reverting to the more generic theme-oriented play of his earlier games like Earthshaker!, Whirlwind, and FunHouse. Instead of another natural disaster theme, Lawlor decided to make a game based on construction work and cross-country travel. It is said that he arrived at the concept for Road Show while sitting stuck in rush-hour traffic outside of Chicago due to road construction. The game became particularly popular at truck stops.

While the theme of Road Show paid homage to Earthshaker! and Whirlwind, the game's most prominent feature duplicated the talking "Rudy" head in FunHouse. Road Show included two talking-head characters: a male bulldozer driver named Ted and his female boss named Red (voiced by country singer Carlene Carter; she also performs her song, "Every Little Thing" in the multiball and jackpot modes). The game's design, however, resembled The Addams Family and Twilight Zone in that a sinkhole started modes, the progression of which could be followed by a prominent display in the bottom center of the playfield. It had a dual-plunger design reminiscent of FunHouse.

== Decline of pinball ==
1995 marked the first year since 1991 that a new Pat Lawlor-designed pinball machine did not appear. The decline of the pinball industry had intensified by this point, and, even though several well-received pinball machines came out during this period, including Steve Ritchie's No Fear: Dangerous Sports, John Popadiuk's Theatre of Magic, and Brian Eddy's Attack from Mars, the commercial success of pinball machines was diminishing by each fiscal quarter.

In 1996, Lawlor designed a new take on pinball, an innovative game called Safecracker, which featured a much smaller playfield than standard pinball machines of the time, operated on a timer rather than a 3-ball structure, and featured a backglass-based "board game" as a major gameplay feature. Safecracker was unique in that players could earn collectible tokens by achieving certain goals. It is widely believed that Safecracker was actually originally intended to be a game based on the Monopoly board game, a contention supported by the prominence of the generic board game ultimately included in the final product, but Williams was unable to negotiate a favorable deal for the license. True or not, Lawlor got another crack at Monopoly in 2001. Safecracker, however, met with uneven critical response and was not a particularly successful commercial product: only 1,148 units of Safecracker left the Williams factory (compared to the over 20,000 units of The Addams Family only four years earlier.)

Lawlor returned to his more conventional style in 1997 with No Good Gofers, an amusing golf-themed machine that returned to his standard signature design elements as well as featuring the return of the spinning disc from Whirlwind. The game included a retractable ramp that launched a ball onto a transparent upper playfield with a hole at the top to simulate a golf shot for a "hole-in-one". No Good Gofers was a limited commercial success with only 2,711 units made.

1998, however, marked the beginning of the end for Williams pinball, as its final three games, The Champion Pub, Monster Bash, and Cactus Canyon were released. The production run of Cactus Canyon was cut short as Williams made a drastic alteration in their hardware philosophy, attempting to revitalize the pinball industry by integrating video screens with standard pinball playfields with Midway's Revenge from Mars (the sequel to 1995's Attack From Mars, and designed by longtime Midway employee George Gomez) in 1999. This experiment, called Pinball 2000, ended ignominiously after heavy initial losses, and Williams ceased pinball operations in late 1999, leaving Pat Lawlor's only planned game for the Pinball 2000 platform, Wizard Blocks, canceled.

== Stern Pinball era ==
In early 2000, Pat Lawlor founded Pat Lawlor Design (PLD) with partners John Krutsch (mechanical designer for all of Lawlor's games) and Louis Koziarz (software programmer). They agreed to terms with Stern Pinball to distribute pinball machines, beginning with a September 2001 release of a traditional pinball machine based on the world's most popular board game, Monopoly. Monopoly was well received by the pinball community and the signature elements of Lawlor design were prominently included.

Lawlor has since designed RollerCoaster Tycoon, Ripley's Believe it or Not!, NASCAR (also known as Grand Prix in Europe), Family Guy, and CSI pinball machines for Stern. NASCAR, released in 2005, was a bit of a departure from Lawlor's normal design philosophy, utilizing more "flow-oriented" gameplay due to the more speed oriented theme. Family Guy, released in 2007, was notable for a unique design element, the "Stewie Pinball", a mini playfield within a playfield. Unlike other mini playfields which simply reduced the distance between pinball elements, "Stewie Pinball" actually engineered all the pinball elements to be completely reduced in scale, a first in mini playfield design. The Family Guy playfield design was duplicated and re-released as Shrek the following year, with all the same features and a different rule set.

== Jersey Jack Pinball ==
On January 24, 2014, Jersey Jack Pinball (JJP) announced that Pat Lawlor would be designing their third release and that the machine would feature an original theme. On October 13, 2016, Dialed In! was announced, which was the first pinball machine to feature Bluetooth connectivity and smartphone integration.

=== Dialed In! ===
Lawlor worked on this title for nearly 2 years, citing when it was announced that he was joining the Jersey Jack team that he would have creative freedom again as he did when working on some of Williams designs. This third title for Jersey Jack was released in 2017 is its first standard body game, packed with features similar to previous Lawlor titles. This theme fits with his existing Whirlwind and Earthshaker! themes as a disaster city, but this time updating it where a rogue cellphone begins causing the havoc. This game features a Pepper's ghost illusion that is similar to that used for premium/LE Stern Ghostbusters. It also has a built-in camera that takes selfies during the game, and it has Bluetooth that can be used to pair with a smartphone and allow the player to control the flippers remotely using an app.

Lawlor designed two more machines while working at JJP: Willy Wonka & the Chocolate Factory in 2019, based on the Gene Wilder film Willy Wonka & the Chocolate Factory, and 2022's Toy Story 4 based on the film of the same name.

== Games designed ==
=== Williams ===
- Wreck'n Ball (1987 prototype)
- Banzai Run (1988)
- Earthshaker! (1989)
- Whirlwind (1990)
- FunHouse (1990)
- Red & Ted's Road Show (1994; part of WMS' SuperPin series)
- No Good Gofers (1997)
- Wizard Blocks (1999; prototype running on Pinball 2000)

=== Midway (Bally) ===
- The Addams Family (1992)
- Twilight Zone (1993; part of WMS' SuperPin series)
- Safecracker (1996)

=== Stern / Pat Lawlor Design ===
- Monopoly (2001)
- RollerCoaster Tycoon (2002)
- Ripley's Believe it or Not! (2004)
- NASCAR (known as Grand Prix in Europe) (2005)
- Family Guy (2007)
- CSI: Crime Scene Investigation (2008)
- Shrek (2008)

=== Jersey Jack Pinball ===
- Dialed In! (2017)
- Willy Wonka & the Chocolate Factory (2019)
- Toy Story 4 (2022)
