= The Flintstones (pinball) =

1994 Williams pinball machine

- The Flintstones pinball flyer
- Manufacturer: Williams
- Release date: July 1994
- System: Williams WPC Security (WPC-S)
- Design: John Trudeau
- Programming: Jeff Johnson
- Artwork: Kevin O'Connor
- Mechanics: Ernie Pizarro
- Music: Dave Zabriskie
- Sound: Dave Zabriskie
- Voices: John Goodman; Rick Moranis; Harvey Korman
- Production run: 4,779

The Flintstones is a pinball game released by Williams in 1994, based upon The Flintstones movie released the same year.

== Design ==
In 1994, Williams released pinball machine based on the live-action theatrical film adaptation of The Flintstones. The design team including Kevin O'Connor visited the film set of Bedrock during early production of the film. The game also features speech provided by John Goodman, Rick Moranis and Harvey Korman reprising their respective roles, as well the theme song from the television series. It uses Williams DCS sound system. This game has a unique feature called smart ramps, this allows the game to decide which flipper to feed the ball to through a plastic loop at the bottom.

The game was initially designed with gold legs, as seen on the flyer, but virtually all production machines were issued with chrome legs. Most machines were issued with black speaker grills, but earlier ones had variant artwork on the speaker panel.

== Gameplay ==
=== Skill Shot ===
When the game is first started, the player is greeted with a skill shot. The skill shot on the machine is the light up the correct light in the "DIG" rollovers at the top of the playfield in which the ball will fall through by using the flippers to move the one lit light back and forth. A few extra million points are awarded when the skill shot is achieved and this amount goes up the more times it is attained.

=== Bronto Crane ===
When the Bronto Crane is first shot (purple lane), it will light the Bronto Crane light, and then when it is shot again, it will lock the ball and display a reward on the DMD above, then launch the ball out of the Bronto Crane toy's mouth. The rewards that may be received are the following:

- 1, 2, 3 values are doubled
- Extra Ball
- Spell CONCRETE
- Bowling Power-Up
- Light 2x Playfield
- Multiplier Maxed
- Bedrock Derby

=== Bowling ===
In the middle of the playfield, there is a bowling alley with a few pins. If the player shoots the ramp with the bowling light flashing in front of it, then a bowling sequence will be initiated where one may get strikes, spares, or gutter balls. If the player hits the bowling alley during normal play, the light in front of the three-sectioned alley will illuminate. Once all three sections are lit, the player will complete one word of "Yabba-Dabba-Doo" (Yabba, Dabba, and Doo). Once all three sections of the phrase are completed, a bowling power-up is awarded. This bowling power-up will let the player to get strikes on all shots after achieving it.

If three strikes are scored in a row (this is easy with a bowling power-up), the game goes into a mode called "Bowl-a-Rama". This is a three-ball multi-ball in which the player gets many points for scoring "Super Strikes" and "Super Spares". The mode will end when two of the three balls the player is given are lost.

=== Machine Time ===
There is a toy at the top of the playfield, one that some may call a "Rock Slicer", that will spin the ball around and around a few times and award points when it falls out. This can be achieved by hitting the yellow bird to the left of the playfield when the "Machine Time" light is lit. It will start a 30-second mode in which the player can shoot the far right lane or the purple lane on the left of the play-field, and the ball will get launched into the Machine. This can be done repeatedly until the time in the mode expires.

=== Dictabird ===
The Dictabird is a yellow-green colored bird in the mid-left of the play-field. The Dictabird's yellow target underneath him can be hit to make him wobble back and forth a couple times, as well as advance certain game-play features.

The first gameplay feature that can be activated is "Job Search". When this mode is activated it will light the "Job Search" light on the far right pathway up the play-field. Points are awarded when the path is shot.

The second gameplay feature that can be activated is where the player has to find the kids (Bam-Bam and Pebbles). In order to do this, the player must shoot the left, center, and right pathways (or just one or two depending on how fast they are found) to find where the kids are located. Then, once located, shoot one of the ramps to save them.

=== Modes ===
There are 4 modes in this game, with a Mystery Mode for completing them. A mode can be started by completing 1-2-3 on the ramps. All three shots may not be on the same ramp so it is necessary to look for the lights, and watch to see which flipper the ball goes to. The modes are displayed in a line on the playfield. Lit ones have been played, the flashing one will be started next, and dark ones are yet to be played. Modes can run concurrently, and during multiball. The bumpers change the currently flashing mode. The modes are:

- Fred's Choice
- Joe's Diner
- Bedrock Water Buffalo's
- Dino Frenzy (2-ball multiball mode)

Once all the modes are completed, the Start Mode light will indicate Mystery Mode, a wizard mode where the player has 20 seconds to knock down the BED and ROCK drop targets for 100 million points. Each target down scores 5 million. The mode ends after 20 seconds, or when the big points are awarded, and Fred's Choice will become the currently flashing mode.

== Reception ==
In a 2021 review of the machine Pinball Mag praised the beauty of its “world under glass” including the playfield art, but heavily criticized the translite and cabinet artwork. The general illumination was also criticized, noting that there are empty holes where more bulbs could have been placed and unsure if it was poor design they were not installed. They did find the game had "flow" with a varied range of shots leading into each other. The missions were also praised, with the video mode highlighted as being original as it is not only played with the flipper buttons, but uses the ball on the playfield. The sounds and call-outs were praised as the best aspect of this machine, and the DMD animations were also enjoyed. While overall mixed they concluded it was "the perfect demonstration that you can make a very honorable pinball machine from a cheesy movie".

RePlay magazine said Williams had taken a "boulder approach", and was a "rock solid" example of the strategy of using licenses.

== Similar machine ==
A pinball redemption game by Innovative Concepts in Entertainment was also released in 1994. Cosmetic additions are made to the outside of the cabinet to make it look like a car from the television series. The game is a little larger than a standard pinball machine. Instead of a standard pinball, it uses a 2-inch foil-coated plastic ball. At the bottom are two reversed flippers which are larger than normal pinball flippers, and a third regular sized Data East flipper is further up the playfield. Just above the playfield the game has a large LED dot matrix display; unlike a pinball machine it has no backbox.
