= Popeye Saves the Earth =

1994 pinball machine

Popeye Saves The Earth
- Page 2 of advertising flyer
- Manufacturer: WMS Industries
- Release date: May 1994
- System: Midway WPC (DCS)
- Design: Python Anghelo, Barry Oursler
- Programming: Mike Boon
- Artwork: Python Anghelo, Pat McMahon, John Youssi
- Mechanics: Zofia Bil Ryan
- Music: Paul Heitsch
- Sound: Paul Heitsch
- Voices: Tim Kitzrow
- Animation: Scott Slomiany, Eugene Geer
- Production run: 4,217 units

Popeye Saves The Earth is a 1994 widebody pinball game designed by Python Anghelo and Barry Oursler and released by WMS Industries under the Bally label. It is based on the Popeye comic/cartoon characters licensed from King Features Syndicate.

It is one of WMS' SuperPin line of widebody games; the tenth and final collaboration between Anghelo and Oursler. The playfield artwork was by Pat McMahon and Anghelo, and the backglass was designed by John Youssi. It uses the DCS sound system.

Most of the games sold outside the United States.

== Story ==
The game was set in the current day, with a middle-aged Popeye living on an island from residual cheques of his time as a cartoon star. Olive Oyl collects seashells on the beach, and Swee'Pea is nearly 30 years old and has a masters degree in marine biology. Wimpy still has a hamburger addiction.

Bluto has formed an oil company, Brutus Oil, which was responsible for a large oil spill on Popeye's island.

== Layout ==
The game has an upper playfield.

== Gameplay ==
The player launches the ball into a roulette style device.

== Reception ==
Play Meter enjoyed the return to a cartoon theme, even with no movie tie-in. Cash Box International couldn't see the reason for the choice of theme, and found the game to be slow. At a seminar at Pinball Expo on October 27, 1995, it was "unanimously agreed" as being the worst game of recent memory.
