= Harley-Davidson (Bally pinball) =

1991 pinball machine

Harley-Davidson (Bally)
- Manufacturer: Midway
- Release date: February 1991
- System: Williams WPC (Alphanumeric)
- Model #: 20001
- Design: Barry Oursler, Mark Sprenger
- Programming: Jim Strompolis
- Artwork: Mark Sprenger
- Mechanics: Gerald Hedberg
- Music: Dan Forden
- Sound: Dan Forden
- Production run: 2,187 units (approximate)

Harley-Davidson is a pinball machine manufactured by Midway and released under the Bally label in February 1991. Barry Oursler and Mark Sprenger designed the pinball game utilizing the Williams Pinball Controller (Williams WPC) arcade system board platform. This was the first Bally game to use the Williams WPC system, and the last to use an Alphanumeric Display.

== Development ==
After the main production run 200 further games were manufactured for Harley dealers.

== Rules ==
Harley-Davidson (Bally pinball) features various gameplay elements that allow players to accumulate points and bonuses. Completing the U-S-A lanes, representing the colors of the American flag (red, white, and blue), with a single-direction lane change, advances the bonus multiplier, which can reach a maximum of 6x and remains unchanged on factory difficulty. Clearing the lanes at 6x triggers the 'lights out lane extra ball' feature. Subsequently, each completion of 'USA' grants players a 'USA bonus,' starting at 100,000 points and increasing by 100,000 points with each collection, without any upper limit.

The game includes two sets of drop targets: one on the far left spelling 'H-A-R' and one in the center spelling 'L-E-Y.' Completing 'HAR' lights up the left spinner, while completing 'LEY' lights up the right spinner, and both award 3,000 points per spin. When players complete both sets, they advance through the HARLEY bonus levels (50,000, 100,000, 200,000, 300,000, and 500,000 points).

The 'DAVIDSON' stand-ups are located around the playfield. Completing 'DAVIDSON' lights up the speed bonus at the right eject, a 'hurry-up' feature that starts at 1 million points and increases by 1 million points with each collection. If players complete 'DAVIDSON' twice during one ball, the extra ball at the right eject becomes available. Additionally, the jackpot can be lit during play while players travel across America.

Hitting the left eject awards 25,000 points at the start of the game. Successive hits on this eject increase its value (10,000, 25,000, 50,000, 100,000, and 150,000, with an additional ball lock). Locking a ball activates the right eject for multi-ball initiation. During multi-ball, completing Harley and 'DAVIDSON' awards 5 million points and lights the orbit shots, which score 1 million points each for the remainder of multi-ball. It's important to note that the jackpot is not directly related to multi-ball. After the first multi-ball, the eject hole value resets to 10,000, with no lights.

== Sega/Stern version ==
Sega Pinball produced an unrelated Harley-Davidson pinball machine in 1999. It was designed by John Borg and Lonnie D. Ropp. The game went through three different production runs. The first was made by Sega and continued by Stern Pinball in 1999 after they bought Sega's pinball division in the same year; the second was produced by Stern Pinball in 2002; and the third, with an artwork change also by Stern was released in 2004. The third version can be played on The Pinball Arcade.
