= Whirlwind (pinball) =

1990 pinball machine

- Manufacturer: Williams
- Release date: January 1990
- System: Williams System 11B
- Design: Pat Lawlor
- Programming: Bill Pfutzenreuter
- Artwork: John Youssi
- Mechanics: John Krutsch; Jack Skalon
- Music: Chris Granner
- Sound: Chris Granner
- Concept: Pat Lawlor
- Production run: 7,304

Whirlwind is a pinball machine produced by Williams in 1990 and was one of the last Williams System 11B games. The game is set in Kansas, and involves storm-chasing. It was designed by Pat Lawlor, whose previous game was also a natural disaster-themed table, Earthshaker!. The game includes three rotating discs on the playfield, and a fan which blows air at the player. An upgraded version of the game was released by Pedretti Gaming in 2023.

== Design ==
The game features three counter-rotating rotating discs. As a cost consideration these are all driven off a single motor, developed by John Krutsch. Ron Baum showed the design team the rubber mat material to cover them with which imparts spin on the ball.

It also is the first pinball machine to have a fan topper that blows wind on the player when the discs spin. Because of this, the marketing slogan was "Feel the power of the wind!". The Sega machine Twister used a similar fan in 1996.

There were two versions of the translite. Early versions were produced with a "C" on the cap of the child with the video camera. This was because the designer and artist were both fans of Chicago Cubs, but to avert a potential legal issue Williams "W" logo stickers were placed over this. Later versions were printed with the "W". At the back left of the playfield is an I-80 symbol with "Visit the fault!" referencing Pat Lawlor's previous game Earthshaker!.

The weather presenter Steve Baskerville interviewed Pat Lawlor about the game as part of a CBS series.

The game introduced a feature called "replay boost" which when the score required to earn a free game was beaten temporarily increased the score required to earn another free game until another game was started using coins. This is in addition to the self-percentaging system used to adjust the replay score over time.

== Layout ==
It is a 3-flipper game, including an upper flipper on the right; one of the ramps is reached from this flipper. Between and below the two lower flippers is a pin. The second ramp is located towards the right of the machine and has a diverter which drops down to enable ball locks in the bottom left corner. In addition to the three counter-rotating rotating discs the game features six pop bumpers, in two triangular formations, one near the top of the playfield, and the other on the left. Towards the left of the machine, just above the discs are two scoops called the cellar and the super cellar. Around the playfield are eight various lanes and targets with direction arrows.

The positioning of the lower group of three pop bumpers was considered unusual; the same designer used a similar group of pop bumpers in later Williams machines The Addams Family and Twilight Zone.

== Gameplay ==
The objective in Whirlwind is to move the storm using the compass targets to light ball locks for multiball. In multiball, a progressive jackpot can be scored by making left ramp shots from the upper right flipper. This jackpot feature is called "million plus". Alternatively, players can light and collect a series of seven "Super Cellar Door" values; these awards are shown as lit inserts underneath the score display on the backbox.

The game is the first to include "Grand Champion" for the all time highest scorer on a particular pinball machine, and not subject to normal automatic resets of high-scores.

== Reception ==
The May 1990 issue of Play Meter predicted that the game would be a major hit that summer, and awarded it 4/4.

Pinball Trader found it to be "a highly entertaining game with great novelty appeal", rating it at 7/10.

== Digital versions ==
The table appeared in Pinball Hall of Fame: The Williams Collection. Whirlwind was released as a licensed Williams table in The Pinball Arcade for several platforms in 2013, but was delisted with the loss of the Williams license on June 30, 2018.

After acquiring the WMS license, Zen Studios released a digital version of the table with optional additional animations for Pinball FX on June 8, 2023.

== Whirlwind: Total Chaos ==
A "2.0" upgrade kit was released by Pedretti Gaming in 2023; this requires an original Whirlwind game to install it on. This is the second upgrade kit manufactured by Pedretti, after FunHouse Rudy’s Nightmare. The upgrade kit includes new speakers, a LCD panel with new color animations, and new circuit boards to run the game. Inside the cabinet are two artblades and a section at the back of the playfield with new designed by the artist for this upgrade, Morti Morti, who also designed the backglass.

The rules for this version were written by Janos Kiss, and new voice work is performed by Marc Silk.

At the start of a game the player can select the original rules, or the Total Chaos rules. With these rules after collecting the seven super cellar door awards a mini-wizard mode can be played, and there is another mini-wizard mode after playing all the new main modes introduced with this upgrade. There is also a final wizard mode.
