= Earthshaker! (pinball) =

1989 pinball machine

- Manufacturer: Williams
- Release date: February, 1989
- System: Williams System 11B
- Design: Pat Lawlor
- Programming: Mark Penacho
- Artwork: Tim Elliott
- Music: Jon Hey, Chris Granner
- Voices: Mark Ritchie
- Production run: 5,257

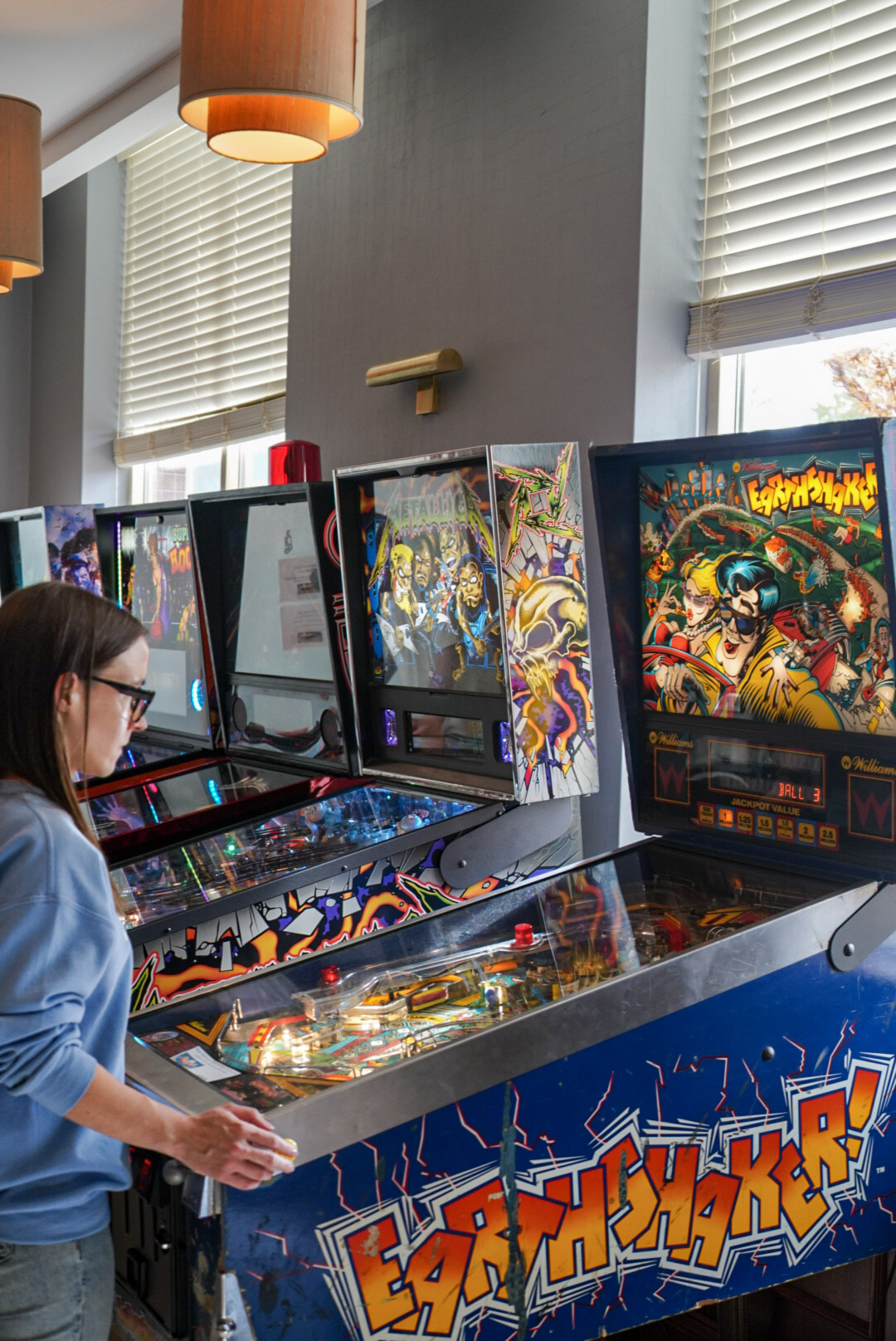
Earthshaker! at UK Pinfest 2025

Earthshaker! is a pinball game designed by Pat Lawlor and released by Williams Electronics in 1989. The game features an earthquake theme, advertised with the slogan "It's a Moving Experience!".

== Design ==
Earthshaker! was the first pinball machine with a shaker motor that causes the table to rumble along with the theme of the game. However, this was not patented by Williams, so it was available for other manufacturers to use in their designs. There are two strength settings for this motor, and it can be turned off by the operator.

The game uses an alphanumeric display with two lines of 16 characters.

The "Earthquake Institute" building on the sample production run of the first 200 machines sinks into the playfield; for cost savings this was made to be stationary for the rest of the production run. A third-party aftermarket kit was later released to add this feature.

The game includes a mechanism with representation of a fault-line at the California-Nevada border which splits apart to reveal a rail for the ball.

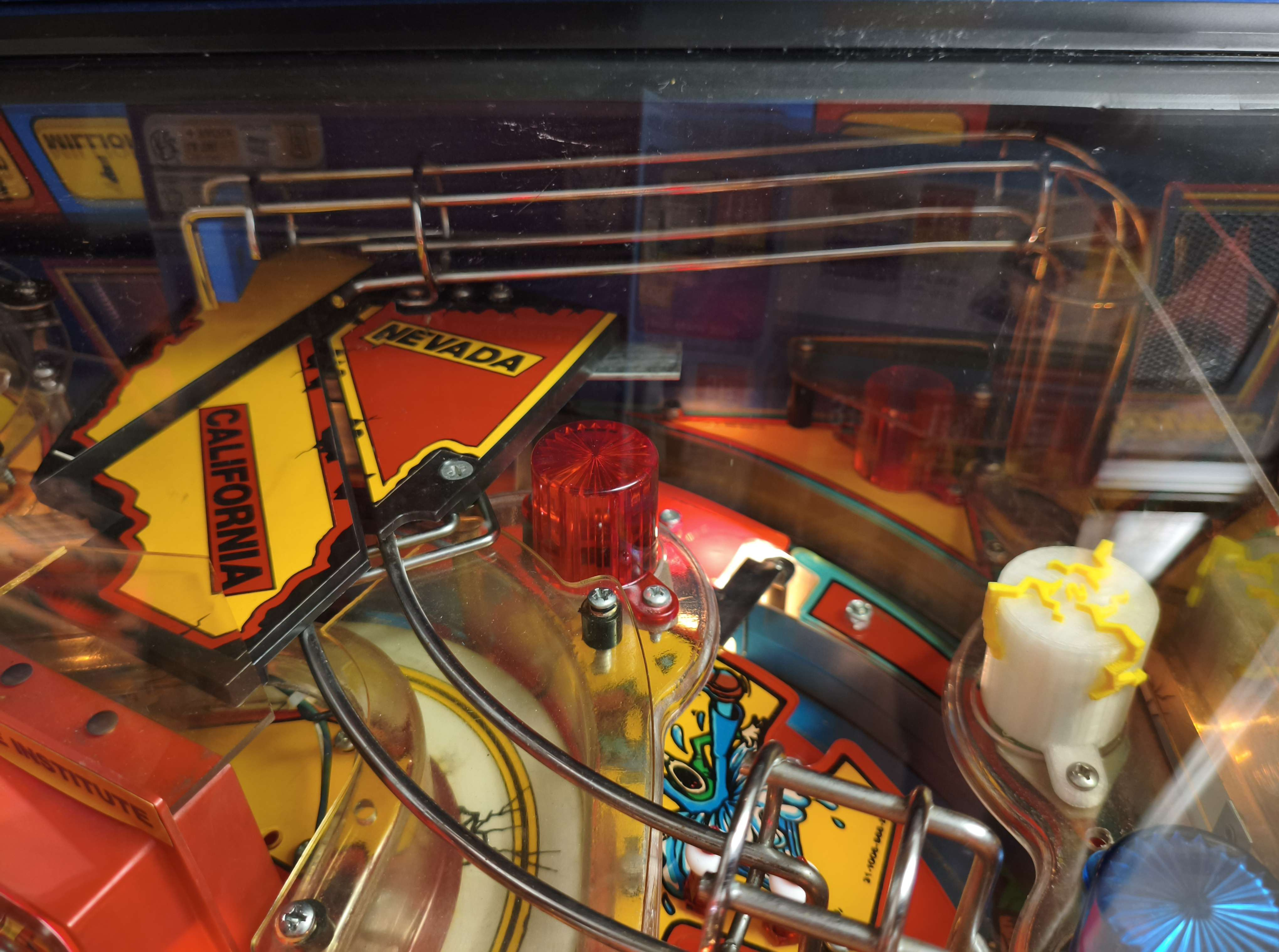
The fault-line mechanism

Mark Ritchie recorded many of the callouts, although the pinball machine is known for a female voice saying "Bitchin'!" which was unusual for its time. A "Family" version of the ROM without this language was released.

In 1990 Pat Lawlor called this his favorite game because of watching peoples faces when the shaker motor activated.

== Layout ==
The ball is launched from the plunger lane to a ramp which leads to a spiral with three holes in it, and continues towards the left in-lane. The game has three flippers, including a mid-field flipper on the left. Across from this upper flipper is a ramp on the right which leads to an upkicker and then a mechanism modelled on a fault-line; when close this leads back to the left in-lane, when open it leads into the sinkhole, called the shelter. The other ramp, located in the centre of the machine, leads to the left in-lane. Between and slightly above the entrances to the two ramps is the shelter sinkhole. Three pop bumpers are located towards the top left of the machine which can be reached from several directions. A lane on the left can direct a ball through the bumpers to hit a spinner. Just to the right of the bumpers are three drop targets labelled visit-the-fault. Behind and above these targets is the "earthquake institute" building with the numbers 1-9 in a 3x3 grid. Around the targets are nine arrows pointing to various targets and lanes which correspond to these numbers. Just below the bumpers is a saucer which kicks the ball to the upper flipper. On the right side of the machine is a captive ball with a target behind it. Between and below the lower flippers is a post.

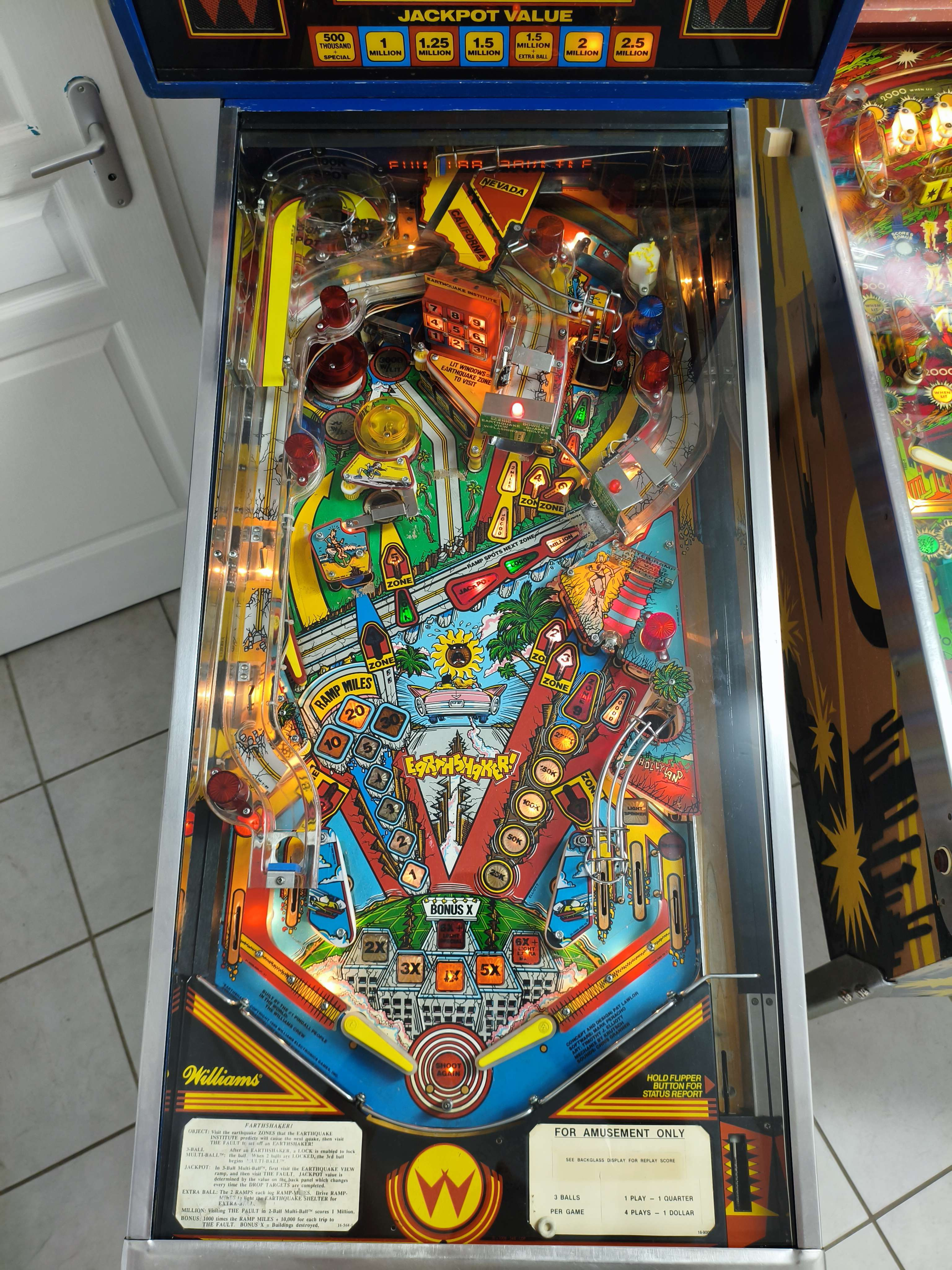
Playfield

== Gameplay ==
The main objective is to complete the earthquake institute's prediction for the next earthquake which is shown in lit windows of windows in the building. The player assumes the role of an earthquake researcher and has to visit these various zones along the California-Nevada border to top a Richter scale. As the game progresses the difficulty increases with more zones lit and the player needs to hit them in a particular order. After completing a set of zones the lock is lit and the bonus multiplier increases. After locking two balls, a three ball multiball begins where the player attempts to score a jackpot, the value of which is shown by lights on the bottom of the backbox, and increased by completing the "visit-the-fault" drop targets.

At the start of each ball a skill shot can score additional points using the holes in the spiral. Hitting the captive ball can collect a series of points, and start a two ball multiball. Random awards are given from the shelter sinkhole.

== Reception ==
Earthshaker! won the 1989 AMOA award for most innovative game.

== Legacy ==
One of the modes on a 2017 pinball machine also designed by Pat Lawlor, Dialed In!, has a mode named after this machine.

== Digital versions ==
Earthshaker! was released as a licensed Williams table in The Pinball Arcade for several platforms in 2014, but was delisted with the loss of the Williams license on June 30, 2018.

It was released alongside Banzai Run and Black Knight 2000 for Pinball FX on December 12, 2024.

== Playtime toys ==
Playtime Products licensed Earthshaker!, and used the name and logo to create a small battery operated toy version and a simple handheld electronic game; neither bear any resemblance to the original playfield.

== See also ==
- Whirlwind
