= White Water (pinball) =

1993 pinball machine

- Manufacturer: Williams
- Release date: January 1993
- System: Williams WPC (Fliptronics II)
- Design: Dennis Nordman
- Programming: Mike Boon
- Artwork: John Youssi
- Mechanics: Win Schilling
- Music: Chris Granner
- Sound: Chris Granner
- Dots/Animation: Scott Slomiany
- Production run: 7,008

White Water is a 1993 pinball machine designed by Dennis Nordman and released by Williams. The theme is based on white water rafting, which is reflected in the game's 'wild' ramps and very fast game-play.

== Design and layout ==
Bigfoot is in the top right corner.

Greg Freres was only involved in the initial stages of design, coming up with the initial concept with Dennis Nordman.

topper

playfield

== Overview ==
White Water is an original themed pinball machine with a primary objective of moving your raft down the river to "Wet Willy's" in order to get the "Vacation Jackpot." You move your raft down the river by shooting the flashing "Hazard" shots, each with a unique rafting theme name. Each time you complete a raft, the number of "Hazard" shots you must hit successfully to complete the next raft increases. It takes eight completed rafts to advance to "Wet Willy's." Successfully completing "Wet Willy's" enables the player to attempt the collection of the "Vacation Jackpot." There are other objectives in the game, which include:

- Multiball: To start multiball, light the lock ball shot by hitting the "Lite" and "Lock" targets and then successfully shooting the ball in the ball lock, also called the "No Way Out" Hazard; doing this 3 times will start multiball.
- Whirlpool: Completing the "Whirlpool" shot will activate one of six awards or modes, which is determined by what is lit when the "Whirlpool" shot is hit. To light the "Whirlpool", thus making the shot active, successfully hit the "Insanity Falls" shot. After hitting the "Insanity Falls" shot, you will know the "Whirlpool" is active when the red light above the shot is lit. One of the six awards or modes starts when the Whirlpool shot, also called "Bigfoot Bluff", is successfully competed.
- Big Foot Hotfoot: There are two "Hotfoot" targets in the middle of the playfield. Hitting both targets comprises a complete "Hotfoot", and the "Hotfoot" targets are reset. Depending on the machine settings, successfully completing the specified number of "Hotfoot" targets starts the "Bigfoot Hotfoot" mode which allows the player to get successive "Bigfoot Jackpots."
- Lost Mine: Hitting the ball in the "Lost Mine" shot awards an item needed to start the "Gold Rush" multiball. There are three items that must be collected to start this multiball, a flashlight, a map, and a key; and these items can be collected through either the "Lost Mine" or the "Bigfoot Hotfoot." Once all three items have been collected, successfully hitting the "Lost Mine" shot starts the "Gold Rush" multiball.

== Reception ==
An article in The Flipside found the scoring to be balanced, and it to be a "solid, enjoyable game that keeps getting better and more challenging the more you play it".

== Digital version ==
White Water was released for The Pinball Arcade for several platforms in 2013, and was available for purchase until the expiration of the Williams license on June 30, 2018.

Zen Studios, having acquired the license to develop digital conversions of Williams pinball tables, released a digital version of White Water as part of volume 4 of Williams pinball tables for Pinball FX3 on May 28, 2019; with a remastered version released for Pinball FX on May 26, 2022.

== Sequel ==
Yukon Yeti is an unofficial sequel also designed by Dennis Nordman and was released by Turner Pinball in 2026. It incorporates some design elements from White Water, including the Yeti, the rapids ramp, and a very similar upper playfield.
