= Red & Ted's Road Show =

1994 pinball machine

- Manufacturer: Williams
- Release date: October 1994
- System: Williams WPC-Security
- Design: Pat Lawlor, Dwight Sullivan, Ted Estes
- Programming: Dwight Sullivan, Ted Estes
- Artwork: John Youssi
- Mechanics: John Krutsch
- Music: Chris Granner, Carlene Carter
- Sound: Chris Granner
- Voices: Carlene Carter (Red), Tim Kitzrow (Ted)
- Production run: 6,259 units

Red & Ted's Road Show (also known as Road Show) is a 1994 widebody pinball game designed by Pat Lawlor and released by Williams. It is part of WMS' SuperPin line of widebody games.

== Design and layout ==
Country singer Carlene Carter provided the voice of Red, and her song "Every Little Thing" is featured in the game. Tim Kitzrow recorded the voice of Ted, and Chris Granner recorded the voice of the Indian character. The game is considered an unofficial successor of FunHouse, as both were designed by Pat Lawlor and feature animated talking head(s) along with some similar playfield layout ideas, such as two manual plungers, one on each side of the cabinet. It is equipped with a shaker motor to make the machine vibrate. It was the first pinball machine to feature an additional daily high score list.

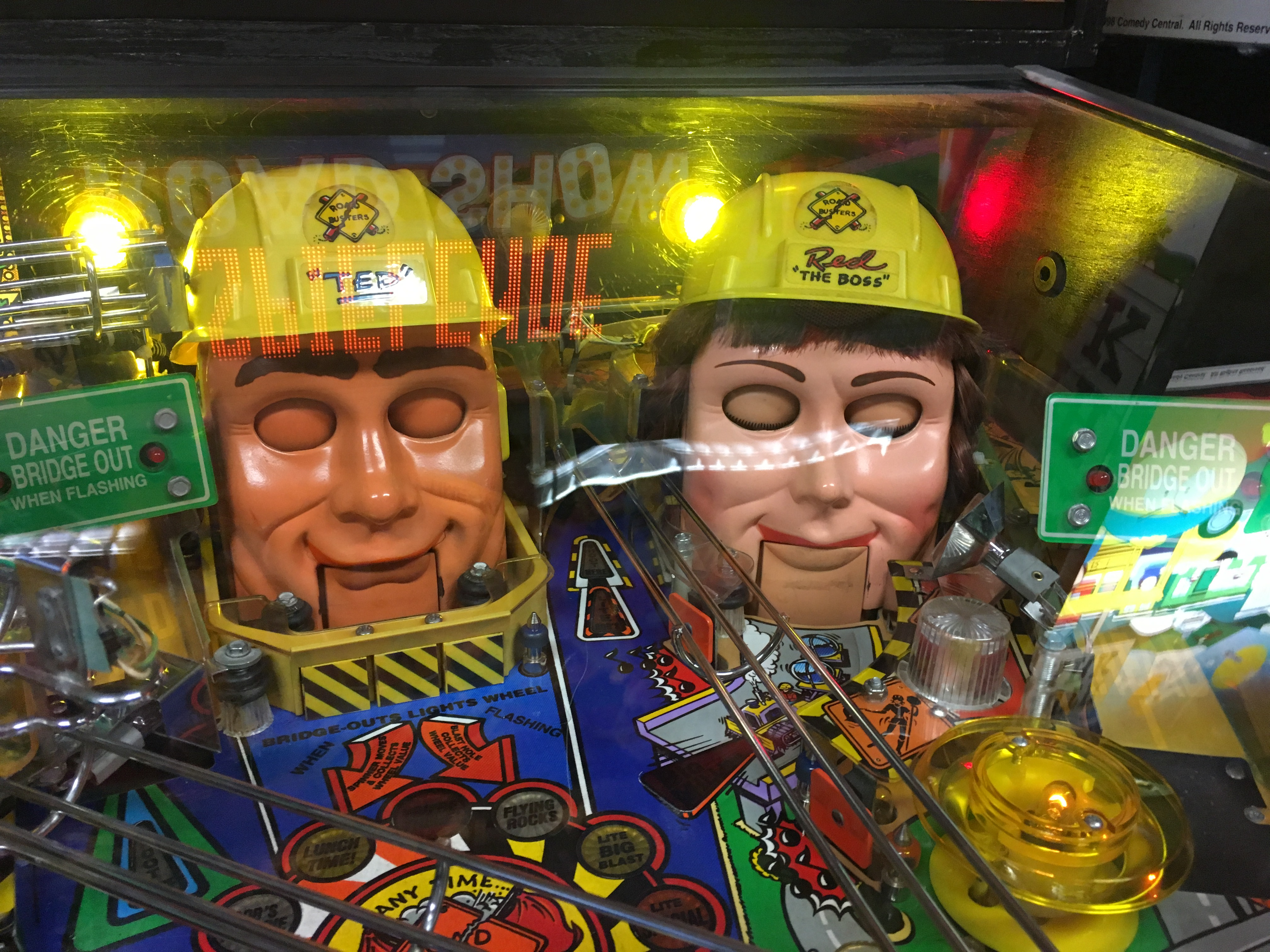
Ted & Red

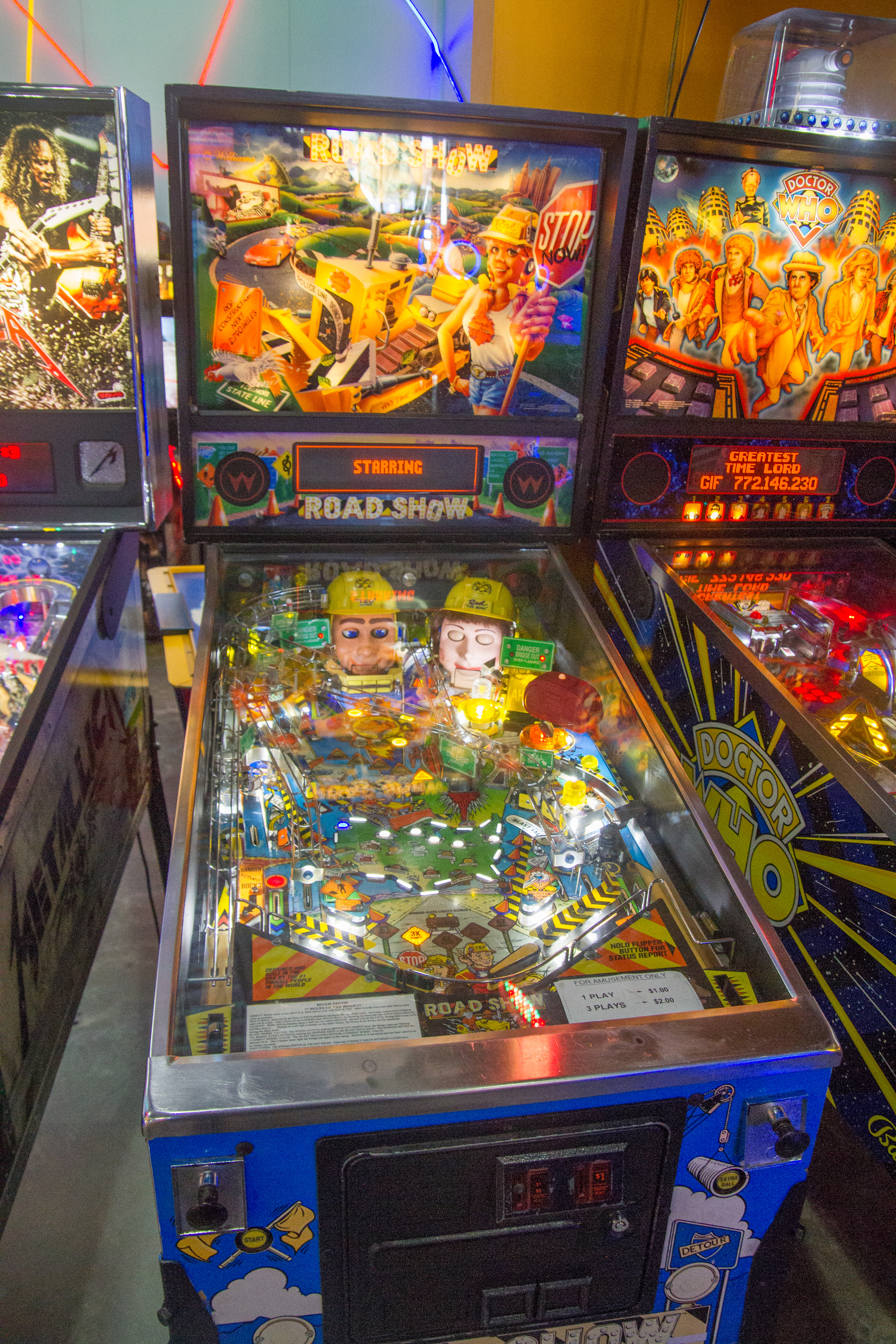
Playfield and backglass

=== Heritage ===
A corvette is shown on the backglass, referencing Corvette which had been released 2 months earlier. A crushed taxi is shown, in possible reference to Taxi. The Ohio Turnpike mode uses police officer callouts from High Speed. The multiball is started in a similar way to FunHouse.

== Gameplay ==
The primary goal is to help Red and Ted, a pair of road construction workers, travel through the United States from east to west. Two ventriloquist-dummy heads representing them are mounted on the playfield, with eyes and mouths that move in time with their speech. The player can visit a total of 18 different cities/states, each of which starts its own mode.

The locations are: New York (Smash a Cab), Miami (Spring Break), Atlanta (Worker Trapped), Ohio Turnpike (Trapped in Ohio), New Orleans (Mardi Gras), Nashville (Change the Station), Chicago (Evil Toll Roads), Dallas (Monster Cab), Kansas City (Tornado), Minneapolis (Frozen People), Albuquerque (Trading Post), Denver (Gold Rush), Butte (Tunnel Hunt), Salt Lake City (Old West), Las Vegas (Slot Machine), Seattle (Alien Invasion), San Francisco (Monster Attack), and Los Angeles (Earthshaker).

The game features a "wizard mode" called Super Payday, which can be started by visiting any of the last three cities in the above list and locking two balls as indicated on the display and playfield before the mode timer runs out. A four-ball multiball then starts, with all major shots lit to award points.

To light locks for multiball, the player must first advance through the work week from Monday to Friday by repeatedly hitting the bulldozer blade in front of Ted's mouth. Two balls must then be locked in Bob's Bunker, after which the blade rises and Ted falls asleep with his mouth open. Shooting the ball into his mouth will start a three-ball multiball, with alternating jackpots awarded for shooting into Ted's mouth and hitting Red. Hits to the blade increase the jackpot, and it raises and lowers when Ted's jackpot is lit in order to increase the difficulty of making the shot. If the player loses two balls without collecting any jackpots, a shot to Bob's Bunker within 12 seconds will restart multiball with two balls.

== Reception ==
The Flipside praised the design decisions of the machine, and found it a rewarding game to play. They stated that Red & Ted's Road Show largely succeeds at telling a coherent and cohesive story; finding that the linear quality gave it a different feel than other pinball games of the time.

== Digital versions ==
A licensed and official digital version was released for The Pinball Arcade in June 2015. It was available until June 30, 2018, when all Williams tables were removed due to licensing issues.

Zen Studios released the table for Pinball FX3 on May 28, 2019 as part of Williams volume 4; with a remastered version released for Pinball FX on May 26, 2022.
