= Safe Cracker (pinball) =

1996 pinball machine

- Manufacturer: Midway Games
- Release date: March 1996
- System: Midway WPC-95
- Design: Pat Lawlor
- Programming: Matt Coriale, Dean Grover
- Artwork: John Youssi
- Mechanics: John Krutsch, Carl Biagi
- Music: Dan Forden
- Sound: Dan Forden
- Animation: Adam Rhine, Brian Morris
- Production run: 1,148

Safe Cracker is a Bally pinball machine released in 1996, designed by Pat Lawlor. It is the first and only Token-Pin.

Some locations would exchange a number of tokens for a small prize, such as a beer.

== Design ==
Pat Lawlor initially pitched Monopoly as the theme for this game, but a large European distributor thought it wouldn't do well in markets outside North America. Monopoly was released by the same designer for Stern as a standard sized pinball machine in 2001.

The machine is smaller in size than a standard pinball machine.

== Gameplay ==
Safe Cracker differs from a standard pinball game in that the player is playing against the clock, as opposed to having a certain number of balls available. If the player loses a ball, as long as there is time left on the clock they can continue playing.

The main objective of the game is to break into the bank's safe. The game can be broken into 3 areas of play:

- The pinball playfield has numerous targets, the completion of which will allow entry into the bank via the rooftop, the cellar, or the front door.
- Once the player has entered the bank, the game changes to a boardgame that takes place on the backglass. Using the flipper buttons to make choices, the player spins a dial that is numbered 1 through 5 and moves their piece around the board while being chased by the security guard who rolls a six sided die. The object of this portion of the game is to advance to the center of the game board (where the safe is located) before being caught by the guard. If the player is successful, the game will eject a "magic token" from the bank vault for the player to catch as it rolls down the playfield glass.
- After the player is done with the regular game, they can deposit their "magic token" into the token slot of the machine to activate a special game mode called "Assault on the Vault". In this 4-ball multiball mode, players have 90 seconds to hit as many drop target and ramp shots as possible to break into the bank vault.

== Reception ==
Cash Box found it to be an intriguing game that deserved to do well.

== Digital versions ==
Safe Cracker released for The Pinball Arcade in 2014 for several platforms, and was available until delisting on June 30, 2018 due to the loss of the Williams license.

It released as a licensed table of Pinball FX3 for several platforms in March 2019; with a remastered version released for Pinball FX on March 31, 2022.
