= The Champion Pub =

1998 pinball machine

- Manufacturer: Williams Electronics Games
- Release date: April 1998
- System: Williams WPC-95
- Programming: Dwight Sullivan
- Artwork: Paul Barker, Linda Doane
- Sound: Rich Carle
- Concept: Pete Piotrowski
- Animation: Adam Rhine
- Production run: 1,369

The Champion Pub is a pinball game released by Williams Electronics Games (under the Bally label) in 1998. The theme of the game revolves around boxing in a turn-of-the-century pub.

== Design ==
Several Williams employees are shown as characters on the backglass, Dwight Sullivan, Pete Piotrowski, Pat McMahon, Paul Barker, Linda Deal, Steve Kordek, and Jim Patla.

== Backstory ==
The game is set on February 3, 1898, when the player's character ("The Kid") finds himself unemployed upon the closure of the shipyard where he has been working. He wanders into the Champion Pub, where he comes to the attention of a boxing coach after successfully defending himself against a drunken patron's assault. Enticed by the possibility of winning large sums of cash as a prizefighter, the Kid agrees to let the coach train him.

== Description ==
playfield

The playfield of The Champion Pub features several toys which include:

- A jump rope area, in which the player must jump the ball over a rotating metal bar using a flipper-controlled solenoid
- A speed bag area, where the player must knock the ball against a target with a pair of plastic fists controlled by the flippers
- A rotating wall with a heavy bag on one side and a boxer figure on the other, which the player can hit with the ball to train for a fight or land punches against an opponent, respectively

Game features include four multiball modes and 15 jackpot levels, 10 different international opponents, and over 300 speech sound effects.

== Gameplay ==
The primary goal is to build up a health bar by making indicated shots, then begin a fight against one of the pub's 10 resident opponents and drain his health by repeatedly hitting the boxer figure. However, the player's health will gradually drain due to the opponent's punches. In order to win a fight, the player must either completely drain the opponent's health or land a knockout punch.

boxer

There are ten opposing boxers: Master Bim Bam Boom (Chinese), Armando Santiago (Spanish), Knuckles O'Brian (Irish), Steveo (American), Sir Winston Pounds (English), Pierre LePunche (French), Dan Unda (Australian), Antonio Jaberini (Italian), Franz von Pain (German), and Patrosky Yirbitov (Russian).

=== Multiball modes ===
The multiballs are as follows:

- Multi-Brawl: A three-ball mode, started by locking three balls. Each lit shot made awards the current jackpot and advances it by one level. Jackpots can also be collected by making lit shots outside of this mode.
- Raid Multiball: A three-ball mode, started by winning three fights. All targets are worth a set value, which increases with every hit up to a maximum.
- Fisticuffs Multiball: A two-ball mode, started by hitting the heavy bag enough times to spell BAR FLY FISTICUFFS. The wall rotates to expose the boxer, who can be hit in the head or stomach for points.
- Champion Multiball: A four-ball mode, started by winning five fights; consists of all three modes above at once, with a bonus for making lit shots.

Certain groups of multiballs can run simultaneously, for which four balls are put into play.

=== Wizard mode: The Ultimate Challenge ===
The wizard mode of the game is the Ultimate Challenge, with the following requirements:

- Play Multi-Brawl, Raid Multiball, and Fisticuffs Multiball
- Collect all 15 jackpots
- Complete all three training exercises (speed bag, heavy bag, jump rope)
- Become the Pub Champion by winning five fights
- Win at least one fight by knockout

Once the Ultimate Challenge begins, four balls are put into play and the player is given one full health bar with which to defeat the five fighters not defeated to become Pub Champion. Successfully doing so lights additional shots for bonus points.

After the player's fifth victory, all fights outside of the Ultimate Challenge are played as "Cash Fights," in which the player must wager a portion of their score to face the opponent of their choice. The wager is added for a victory or deducted for a loss.

== Digital versions ==
The Champion Pub was released as a licensed Williams table in The Pinball Arcade for several platforms, but was delisted with the loss of the Williams license on June 30, 2018.

The Champion Pub was released by Zen Studios of Pinball FX 3; with a remastered version released for Pinball FX on March 31, 2022.
