= FunHouse (pinball) =

1990 pinball machine

- Manufacturer: Williams
- Release date: November 1990
- System: Williams WPC (Alphanumeric)
- Design: Pat Lawlor; Larry DeMar
- Programming: Larry DeMar; Brian Eddy
- Artwork: John Youssi
- Mechanics: John Krutsch
- Music: Chris Granner
- Sound: Jon Hey
- Voices: Ed Boon (Rudy)
- Production run: 10,751 units (approximate)

FunHouse is a pinball machine designed by Pat Lawlor and released in November 1990 by Williams Electronics. Starring a talking ventriloquist dummy named Rudy, the game is themed after the concept of an amusement park funhouse in Chicago. FunHouse is one of the last Williams games to use an alphanumeric display; the company switched to dot matrix the following year.

== Design ==
Rudy—shown sleeping—with animatable eyes and mouth. The mouth conceals a kick-out hole.

Early concept art by John Youssi used the name "CrazyHouse", and in early stages of development the game was also called Side Show.

FunHouse's primary feature is the talking head of a ventriloquist dummy, named Rudy, located in the top right corner of the playfield; the dummy was named Rudy by Pat Lawlor's daughter. Rudy responds to events in the game, including informing the player of special bonuses, taunting and heckling the player, and appearing to follow the ball with its eyes when certain targets are hit. Rudy is voiced by Ed Boon, and the technology behind Rudy's facial movements was dubbed "Pin-Mation" by Williams.

The design of Rudy began with Lawlor instructing John Youssi to watch the 1978 film Magic, but other than the sinister tone, it added little detail to the identity of Rudy.

A patent was granted which describes how "Rudy" works. The mouth is moved by an electric motor controlled by the games microprocessor. When the players successfully hits a ball into the mouth, it is ejected by a solenoid. The eyes are operated by a pair of pull-pull solenoids and follow the ball around the playfield.

The theme and artwork were heavily inspired by Riverview Park, an amusement park near the manufacturer's headquarters which closed in 1967. Some elements of the backglass are based on the Aladdin's Castle attraction. The idea for Rudy's eyes moving was also inspired by this attraction which had large moving eyes. The park's Riverview Carousel is also depicted on the backglass.

Two references to Pat Lawlor's previous game Whirlwind are on the playfield; a whirlwind at the entrance to the mystery mirror scoop, and Kansas feel the power at the top of the machine, behind Rudy. Whirlwind is set in Kansas, and "feel the power" is one of the callouts at the start of a multiball.

== Layout ==
It is the first pinball machine to include two plungers. There is an entrance to the back of Rudy's head which is used as the skillshot; Rudy is located towards the top right of the machine. The game has three flippers, including a mid-field flipper on the left side of the playfield. The three pop bumpers are arranged in a triangular formation on the right side of the machine, with the path to the right orbit (called the gangway) through the middle of the group. To the left of Rudy is a lane which feeds the ball to the upper flipper. From the upper flipper is the shot towards Rudy's mouth, and slightly below it a lane with a secret trap door. Towards the left of the machine is the left orbit which leads to the pop bumpers, a Trapdoor ramp which loops around the machine to the left inlane or the left plunger, and the magic mirror sinkhole. A second sinkhole located just below the bumpers releases the ball at various stages throughout the game.

Initial test machines were produced with an additional S-T-E-P-S target, but the final S (from towards the right of the machine) was removed for production machines when Mark Ritchie found it obstructed some shots.

== Gameplay ==
The game's overall theme is that of a funhouse, with the player taking on the role of a visitor to see its attractions. The overall goal of the game is to advance the "game time" to midnight and cause the funhouse to close, allowing the player to start multiball mode. A secondary goal of the game is to complete the "Mystery Mirror" by lighting all of its modes, starting "Super Frenzy" mode.

Every target and ramp has a name and function following the funhouse theme. Aside from Rudy himself, the game's main feature is a virtual clock in the center of the playfield, which advances by various increments with each successful shot or target hit. When the clock reaches 11:30, it stops advancing and the game announces that the funhouse will close in 30 minutes. Making a successful shot to the "Hidden Hallway" locks the current ball and advances the clock to 11:45. Making this shot again locks the second ball, advances the clock to midnight, and causes Rudy to fall asleep with his mouth open. The player must then shoot a ball into Rudy's mouth to start multiball. While at least two balls are in play, the player can score a Jackpot by shooting the Trap Door next to Rudy while it is open. When multiball mode ends, the time resets to an earlier "opening" time, and single-ball mode continues as before.

Unusually for a modern pinball machine, there is no bonus multiplier.

== Reception ==
A review for The Flipside stated that Rudy was funny, and that the shots of the machine are varied and interesting. The reviewer also criticized FunHouse for having "one specific way to earn big scores".

Pinball Trader found the music, sounds and speech to be "well done", with the comical style appropriate for them. The game was found to have good game rules, and some hard shots, rating it at 7/10.

== Legacy ==
The 1993 Williams pinball table Twilight Zone includes music and quotes from the game as part of its "Fast Lock" mode, and a different quote as a hidden surprise in its "Clock Chaos" mode.

The 1994 Williams pinball table Red & Ted's Road Show includes two animating heads which work similarly to Rudy.

== Digital versions ==
Amtex, who had released Eight Ball Deluxe in 1993, planned to release a version of FunHouse, but it was never completed.

The table was included in the arcade game cabinet UltraPin in 2006.

The table is included in Pinball Hall of Fame: The Williams Collection on several systems between 2008 and 2011. FunHouse was released by the same developer for the first season of The Pinball Arcade in 2013, and it was available until June 30, 2018, when all Williams tables were removed due to licensing issues.

Zen Studios released the table as part of Williams volume 6 on October 20, 2020 for Pinball FX3. A remastered version released for Pinball FX on June 30, 2022.

== FunHouse: Rudy's Nightmare ==
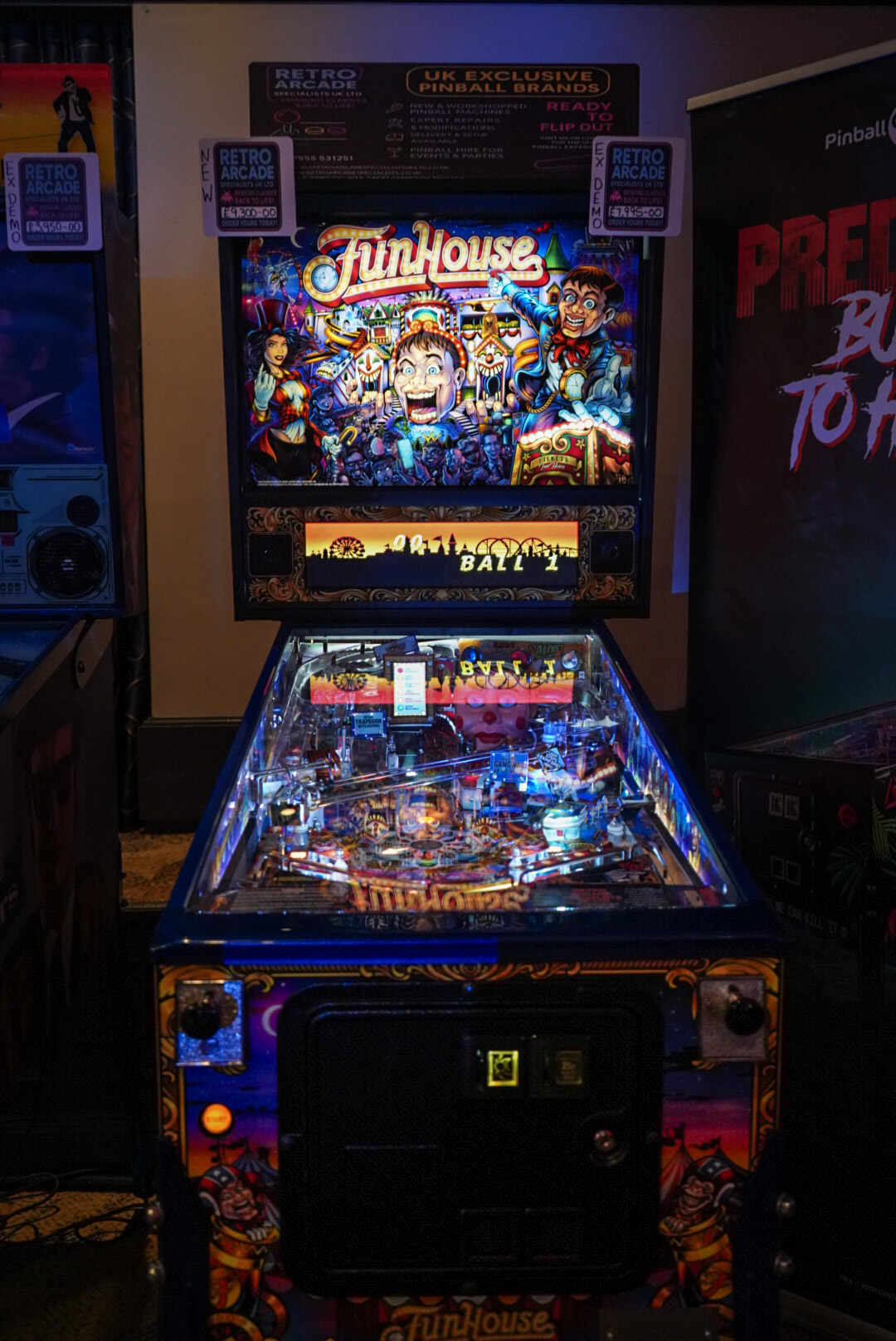
FunHouse remake at UK Pinfest 2025

An upgrade kit was announced and released in 2021 by Pedretti Gaming. This included new CPU and sound boards, new LCD and translite in the backbox, a smaller LCD to replace the mystery mirror, and additional cabinet art which are all installed on an original FunHouse machine. The artwork was designed by Morti Morti. Several additional modes are added to the new software, with an option to play with the original ruleset. The new voicework was performed by Marc Silk.

Two versions of a remake of FunHouse were announced in 2024, both incorporating Rudy's Nightmare but with a larger display in the backbox, and can autoplunge pinballs. The classic edition uses the artwork from the original machine. The midnight limited edition uses new cabinet artwork, a shaker motor, and has various cosmetic additions.

== See also ==
- Comet - a pinball machine by Williams released in 1985 featuring an amusement park theme
- Cyclone - a pinball machine by Williams released in 1988 featuring an amusement park theme
