= List of pinball game designers =

The following is a list of notable pinball game designers. Many pinball designers are famous amongst pinball players. Outstanding pinball game designers are recognized by the Pinball Expo Hall of Fame.

Designer	Notable work	Honors	Ref.
Python Anghelo	Pin*Bot, Taxi, Big Guns, The Machine: Bride of Pin*Bot, Comet, High Speed, Cyclone, Taxi, Police Force, Bad Cats, Bugs Bunny's Birthday Ball, The Machine: Bride of Pin-Bot, Hurricane, Fish Tales, and Popeye Saves the Earth	Hall of Fame (inaugurated in 2010)	
John Borg	Star Wars, Guns ’N Roses, The Walking Dead, Jurassic Park, Apollo 13, Mary Shelley’s Frankenstein, and Tron: Legacy	Hall of Fame (2012)	
Nolan Bushnell	Frenzy	Hall of Fame (2014)	
Larry DeMar	Black Knight, Jungle Lord, Space Shuttle: Pinball Adventure, High Speed, Banzai Run, FunHouse, Jack*Bot, The Addams Family, The Twilight Zone, World Cup Soccer, Video games: Defender, Stargate, Robotron: 2084, and Blaster	Hall of Fame (1999)	
Brian Eddy	Attack from Mars, Medieval Madness, The Shadow, FunHouse, The Machine: Bride of Pin-Bot, The Shadow, and Indiana Jones: The Pinball Adventure	Hall of Fame (2014)	
Keith Elwin	Godzilla and Jurassic Park	Hall of Fame (2025)	
Charlie Emery	Rob Zombie Spookshow International, Domino's Spectacular Pizza Adventure, and Alice Cooper's Nightmare Castle		
Dan Forden	Black Knight 2000, Bad Cats, Rollergames, Riverboat Gambler, The Machine: Bride of Pin*Bot, The Getaway: High Speed II, Star Trek: The Next Generation, No Fear: Dangerous Sports, Medieval Madness, Mousin' Around!, Harley-Davidson,The Party Zone, The Shadow, Attack from Mars, Safe Cracker, Revenge from Mars, and The Simpsons Pinball Party Video games: Mortal Kombat, WWF Raw, NBA Ballers, Arch Rivals, and Mortal Kombat II		
George Gomez	Johnny Mnemonic, NBA Fastbreak, Monster Bash, Revenge from Mars, The Lord of the Rings, Corvette, and Deadpool	Hall of Fame (2008)	
David Gottlieb	Baffle Ball	Hall of Fame (1991)	
Eugene Jarvis	Airborne Avenger, Superman, Firepower,Space Shuttle, High Speed, and F-14 Tomcat	Hall of Fame (2013)	
Steve Kordek	Grand Prix, Triple Action, and Vacation America	Hall of Fame (1993)	
Ed Krynski	"300", 2001, 4 Square, The Amazing Spider-Man, El Dorado City of Gold, Genie, Spirit of 76, Central Park, and Big Shot	Hall of Fame (2003)	
Pat Lawlor	Whirlwind, FunHouse, The Addams Family, Twilight Zone, Red & Ted's Road Show, Dialed In!, Banzai Run, Earthshaker!, No Good Gofers, CSI: Crime Scene Investigation, Ripley’s Believe it or Not, and Family Guy	Hall of Fame (2000)	
Raymond Moloney	Ballyhoo	Hall of Fame (1991)	
John Popaduik	Theatre of Magic, Tales of the Arabian Nights, World Cup Soccer, Star Wars Episode I, and Cirqus Voltaire	Hall of Fame (2011)	
Montague Redgrave	Parlor Table Bagatelle		
Mark Ritchie	Taxi, Diner, Fish Tales, Indiana Jones: The Pinball Adventure, Sorcerer, Big Guns, and Police Force	Hall of Fame (2011)	
Steve Ritchie	Black Knight, Firepower, High Speed, Black Knight 2000, Terminator 2: Judgment Day, Star Trek: The Next Generation, AC/DC, Flash, Hyperball, F-14 Tomcat, Rollergames, Spider Man, and No Fear: Dangerous Sports	Hall of Fame (1997)	
Roger Sharpe	Barracora, Sharpshooter, and Cyclopes	Hall of Fame (2000)	
Lyman F. Sheats Jr.	The Who's Tommy Pinball Wizard, Guns N' Roses, Medieval Madness, Monster Bash, Spider-Man, WWF Royal Rumble, The Walking Dead, and AC/DC	Hall of Fame (2015)	
Harry E. Williams	Flat-Top, Laura, Suspense, and Lucky Inning	Hall of Fame (1991)	

== See also ==
- List of game designers
- List of pinball machines
- List of pinball manufacturers
