= Star Trek: The Next Generation (pinball) =

1993 pinball machine

- Manufacturer: Williams
- Release date: November 1993
- System: Williams WPC (DCS)
- Model #: 50023
- Design: Steve Ritchie, Dwight Sullivan, Greg Freres
- Programming: Dwight Sullivan, Matt Coriale
- Artwork: Greg Freres
- Mechanics: Carl Biagi
- Music: Dan Forden
- Sound: Dan Forden
- Voices: The Star Trek: The Next Generation cast
- Animation: Scott Slomiany, Eugene Geer
- Licensor: Paramount Pictures
- Production run: 11,728

Star Trek: The Next Generation is a widebody pinball game, designed by Steve Ritchie and released in November 1993 by Williams Electronics. It was part of WMS' SuperPin series (see also The Twilight Zone and Indiana Jones: The Pinball Adventure), and was based on the TV series.

It is the only pinball machine that features three separate highscore-lists. Apart from the regular highscore-list and the buy-in-list (used when the player purchases an extra ball with an additional credit), it also features a reminiscence to The Machine: Bride of Pin*Bot billionaires club.

It is the third pinball game overall based on the Star Trek franchise, following the 1979 pinball game by Bally, and the 1991 game by Data East (both based on the original series); and preceding the 2013 pinball game by Stern (based on the 2009 and 2013 J. J. Abrams films) also designed by Steve Ritchie.

== Design ==
According to an interview, Steve Ritchie, a longtime Star Trek fan, stated that getting the license was a challenge, due to Paramount insisting that they don't want to put any violence in the game; however, he told them that he would never violate the Prime Directive.

Originally, the game was going to be based on the 1992 film, Under Siege, but changed to Star Trek: The Next Generation when the opportunity came up. Steve Ritchie and some of the design team visited the sets of the Enterprise, and met with Michael Westmore, Michael Okuda, Rick Sternbach, Dan Curry, and others to hear suggestions for what to include in the game.

When Williams went after the license they believed the sixth season would be its last, and there was great interest amongst distributors for a game based on the series.

The game had a longer than typical development time, taking 14 months to complete. In addition to creating the artwork for the machine, Greg Freres designed the sculpted models, which were made by Jerry Pinster. The code for the game written by Dwight Sullivan and Matt Coriale was the largest in any pinball machine up to that point.

The mechanical engineer for this game, Carl Biagi, created several mechanisms including the distinctive cannons, which are protected by the same patent first used in Terminator 2: Judgment Day. The game uses a patented subway system where a ball goes under the playfield and either the same or a different ball appears elsewhere, but to the player it always appears to be the same ball. This is integrated into the theme because Star Trek includes transporters.

The Borg ship was originally intended to be a Borg cube, but during the development of this table Paramount decided to redesign the ship, and Michael Okuda sent Williams sketches and photos of the new design.

In the design stages a video mode similar to Tempest or Gyruss was considered but never completed.

=== Audio ===
The game uses the DCS Sound System and includes voice clips recorded by the cast of the television series, with:

- Patrick Stewart as Captain Jean-Luc Picard
- Jonathan Frakes as Commander William Riker
- Brent Spiner as Lieutenant Commander Data
- Gates McFadden as Dr. Beverly Crusher
- Michael Dorn as Lieutenant Worf
- Marina Sirtis as Counselor Deanna Troi
- LeVar Burton as Lieutenant Commander Geordi La Forge
- Majel Barrett as the computer voice
- John de Lancie as Q.

These clips were recorded after ADR sessions. Patrick Stewart corrected some of the speech, and suggested additional ideas. Due to Jonathan Frakes "fooling around" in his recording session only a little was used from him.

The designer of the game, Steve Ritchie, recorded the voice for Admiral Biagi (named after the mechanical engineer for the game).

In total there is three times more speech than in any pinball game prior to 1993, with twelve pages of single spoken lines, and thirteen original tunes in addition to the theme tune.

=== Display ===
The dot matrix display (DMD) shows animations as the game is played, in some modes this is based on the LCARS system.

color DMD using LCARS system of display

== Layout ==
The game uses a plunger button on a phaser to launch the ball.

upper part of playfield, including the three ramp entrances

The plunger lane leads round a helical wireform to reach the three upper rollovers located above three pop bumpers. The game has seven emblem shots which are indicated by Starfleet insignia inserts. These are the three ramps - Alpha quadrant (right ramp), Beta quadrant (center ramp), and Delta quadrant (upper left ramp). The other four are the left and right orbits, mission start sinkhole located in the center of the machine just to the right of the center ramp, and a second sinkhole is located between the neutral zone and the Delta quadrant ramp. There is a spinner located in the left orbit. The right orbit doesn't continue around the machine, but uses a mechanism to lock the ball or direct it into the bumpers. The game has a cannon on each slingshot; the ball can reach these through the subway, and they fire the ball using a catapult when the player presses the trigger. There are a series of stand-up/spot targets around the playfield, a group of three above and to the side of each slingshot, one either side of the entrance to the right ramp, two to the right of the entrance of the left orbit, and one called the "Q" target to the right of the mission start hole. The neutral zone towards the back of the machine consists of two more targets on either side of another sinkhole. The left outlane contains a kickback mechanism. Above the playfield are located models of a Klingon bird of prey, a Romulan warbird, the Einstein shuttlecraft, and a Borg ship.

== Gameplay ==
=== Launch options ===
Whenever a ball is served to the plunger, the player may choose one of five awards and collect it by launching the ball. Unless otherwise noted, the ball is launched through the spiral ramp and into the lock hole (above the pop bumpers). Another ball is popped from the left scoop and onto the left inlane.

- Start Mission: Starts flashing mission. May be used to start the Final Frontier wizard mode (see below).
- Flipper Skill Shot: The player has to shoot the ball up the right ramp (the Beta Quadrant) for a random award.
- Launch Probe: The ball will be loaded into one of the two cannons, located on top of the slings. Shoot the lit target for a random award.
- Light Lock / Light Holodeck: The ball is immediately locked for multiball, and another one is served to the left inlane. Once two balls are locked, this option changes to "Light Holodeck" until multiball has been played.
- Warp Factor 4: Starts the ball at Warp Factor 4. During Factor 9 mode (depending on the ROM version; see below), this award will advance the warp factor by 0.1 to a maximum of 9.9. Once the mode ends, the award changes to "Warp Factor 2" for the remainder of the game.

=== Scoring and Game Modes ===
There are several ways to score points outside of the missions as well as unlocking certain game modes. The following modes are available:

- Explosive Millions - Shooting the Alpha Quadrant or Beta Quadrant ramps starts a 10-second timer. A shot to either ramp resets the timer and awards points (5 million for the first shot, 10 million for the second, then increasing by 10 million for each subsequent shot).
- Bonus Multipliers - Hitting all three rollover lanes above the bumpers will increase the bonus multiplier for that ball. The first completion raises it to 2X, and subsequent steps raise it 2X at a time to a maximum of 10X. When the 8X is achieved, the Extra Ball light is lit in the "Start Mission" pocket. When the multiplier is maxed, completing the rollovers again awards 10 million, with the value increasing by 10 million every time afterward.
- Holodeck - The player may either receive 25 million points or play a "Shuttle Simulation" video mode, using the flipper buttons to choose. The latter choice requires the player to pilot a shuttle through a network of caverns, pressing the flipper buttons to steer left and right and avoid mines. Awards can be picked up along the way, consisting of points, an extra ball, and/or an artifact; however, once an extra ball is earned during this mode, it is removed for any subsequent playings. The mode ends once the player hits a mine/wall or collects the artifact. Pulling the launch trigger while pressing the button for the Shuttle Simulation starts a secret video mode, "Riker's Poker Night," in which the player can score points for completing different poker hands. If a specific flipper combination is entered before launching the first ball, a monochrome version of Breakout is played on the DMD instead.
- Kickback - Shooting the three left yellow targets lights Kickback, which saves the ball from draining from the left outlane. Under normal difficulty settings, the Kickback is lit at the start of the game, while in tournament mode it must first be enabled from the targets.
- Shuttles - Each shot to the Beta Quadrant ramp launches one shuttle. Awards such as Light Holodeck, Command Decision, and Light Extra Ball are given for reaching set numbers of shuttles. The ramp entrance is flanked by a pair of stand-up targets, either of which enables the ramp to award two shuttles for a few seconds when hit. If the player hits both targets and then shoots the ramp, four shuttles are awarded.

=== Missions ===
The game features seven "missions" (modes), all of which must be played in order to enable the "Final Frontier" wizard mode.

- Time Rift
- Worm Hole
- Search The Galaxy
- Battle Simulation
- Q's Challenge
- Rescue
- Asteroid Threat

There are various marked targets around the playfield with the Star Trek insignia. Different combinations of these are lit for different modes, indicating which shots the player needs to make. These modes are not stackable, meaning the player must complete one mission before starting another. There is a hole in the center at the top of the playfield labelled "Start Mission" which will start a mission at any time if the player makes the shot. In addition, hitting the lit "Command Decision" Target allows the player to select which mission to attempt, including already attempted missions (marked as "rerun" missions; varies from no allowable "reruns" to unlimited "reruns", depending on the machine's settings).

In all missions except Q's challenge, if the player fails to complete certain objectives by losing the ball to the drain, Data will say, "Had you projected the ball along the proper trajectory, you would have been rewarded." Pressing both flippers during this line activates an Easter egg, in which Picard will interrupt Data and say, "Thank you, Mr. Data." The Easter egg also adds 10 million points to the score.

==== Artifacts ====
Each Mission can award one or more "Artifacts", which add to the value and bonuses of the "Final Frontier" Mission. (Artifacts can also be earned during Warp Mode — see "Warp Factors" below - or in the Holodeck video mode.) These Artifacts are, in award order, Dilithium Crystals, an Isolinear Chip, a Duranium Sphere, and a Singing Stone. Once all four Artifacts are awarded, the order starts again with the Dilithium Crystals. Thus, multiples of each Artifact can be awarded. Every Artifact collected is worth 50 million points.

Missions shown on the Starship Enterprise in attract mode

==== List of Missions ====
Time Rift

All the signature targets are lit and worth 10 million points. Hitting the Time Rift targets to the left cause the count down timer to add time and the bonus amount to increase by 5 million. Both the time increases and the bonus amount top out once the bonus reaches 25 million; further hits add no extra time or score. Each time the target is hit, a different character speaks. One Artifact is awarded after hitting any 4 Rift Markers (duplicates count).

Worm Hole

The left orbit, Beta Quadrant/Shuttle ramp, and Delta Quardant/Worm Hole ramp are lit. The goal is to shoot the Worm Hole ramp. This is facilitated by hitting the Shuttle ramp, which feeds the right flipper to shoot the left orbit, which feeds the upper right flipper to the Worm Hole ramp. Each completed Shuttle ramp shot increases the value of the Worm Hole target by 10 million, as does the left orbit spinner by 1 million per "spin". Failure to hit the Worm Hole ramp before time expires awards a flat 20 million. Completing the Worm Hole awards the accumulated points and an Artifact.

Search The Galaxy

The three ramp targets light up. Riker tells the player to "set course for the Alpha Quadrant". Technically, the targets can be complete in any order, but if done in the order of Alpha, Beta, and Delta, the Neutral Zone target lights up as a fourth target and is considered the "Gamma Quadrant". After completing a target, Riker orders the player to set course for the next target not yet reached. Base award is 5 million; each Quadrant completed adds 10 million times the order hit. Completing the three Ramp Quadrants in any order awards one Artifact; completing in order AND getting the "Gamma Quadrant" awards a second Artifact and 40 million more points.

Cannon (feat. Prototype Dome)

Battle Simulation

A ball is loaded up in one of the cannons and the player must either shoot the Neutral Zone targets/hole or the Start Mission hole. The targets alternate, and if successful, another ball is loaded in the other cannon. If the player misses, then they must hit the ball into either of the targets or the Advance Rank hole in order to have another ball loaded into a cannon. Sometimes a player can hit the target of the Neutral Zone, get credit, but not actually sink the ball and have to recover from that. Completing the first 5 "Levels" awards an Artifact. If completed without "losing" the ball to the playfield, it activates a Level 6 which—if hit—awards an extra ball.

Q's Challenge

Q shows up and greets Picard as he often does in the TV series, "Bonjour, mon Capitaine!". Picard responds, "Q, what are you doing here?" Q says, "Let's play a little game." As the ball is being served up to the left flipper, Riker replies, "Q, we don't have time for your games." A couple of the signature targets is lit. There is a tiny target in front of the foremost pop bumpers that has "Q" shown on it. Any time the player hits it, another target lights up. As the player hits targets, others light up. Each completed target awards 10 million times the order hit. Each target also has a time out, where it will fade after a given time period. Completing five Q targets awards an Artifact. If the player drains the ball through the outlanes, or does hit the proper targets, there are several cracks that Q will make:

- "Someday you'll learn to play pinball."
- "And you were doing so well."
- "Pity."
- "Is that the best you can do?"
- "OK, that's enough."
- "Congratulations!"
- "Not bad, not bad at all."
- "Now, try this!"

Rescue

The goal is to rescue 50 Starfleet personnel. The Alpha ramp, Start Mission, and shuttle ramp targets light up. Any targets on the playfield that get hit cause personnel to be loaded onto the shuttle. Hitting either the Alpha ramp or the shuttle ramp will rescue the personnel currently loaded. When the player hits the Start Mission target, Riker says, "Five to beam up", and an animated graphic plays showing five personnel being rescued. When the player has hit enough targets that there are no more personnel to load, the computer voice instructs the player to board the shuttle at once. Getting 25 personnel to "safety" (either aboard the shuttle OR beamed up) awards one Artifact; saving all 50 awards a second Artifact.

Asteroid Threat

The Start Mission shot lights up as a hurry-up value begins to count down from 20 million and the ship enters an asteroid field. Hitting the shot awards the points, destroys an asteroid, and starts a 30-second timer with all seven major shots lit for the same value. If the countdown reaches 5 million, the asteroid explodes on its own and the timer begins to run with all shots set at 5 million. Each shot destroys another asteroid and goes out of play after being hit. One artifact is awarded for destroying a total of four asteroids, including the one in the initial hurry-up; a second one is given for making every shot before time runs out.

The Final Frontier (Wizard Mode)

After completing all the other missions, Final Frontier can be started by shooting Start Mission or choosing it in a Command Decision. The player receives 100 million points for each individual artifact collected, and an additional billion points for each complete set of four. All six balls are put into play, with the first two fired by the player from the cannons and the other four being auto-plunged. Every major shot is lit, awarding 25 million points times the number of artifacts collected (to a maximum of 250 million), or 10 million if the player has no artifacts. This mode continues until five balls have drained.

=== Warp Factors ===
At the start of each ball, the warp factor is set to 1. The right inlane will light the left loop to award a warp factor; the ball must travel fully around the loop in order to advance. Until Warp 9 is reached for the first time, each shot to the Delta Quadrant (left ramp) will also advance the warp factor. Awards for each factor are as follows:

- Warp Factor 2: 5 million points.
- Warp Factor 3: Million Jets Are Lit. Each pop bumper hit is worth 1 million points in addition to increasing the Borg Jackpot (see below).
- Warp Factor 4: Spinner Is Lit. Each turn of the spinner target has its value multiplied by 100 (from 1,000 to 100,000, for example). This increase can only be earned once per ball.
- Warp Factor 5: Multipliers Are Held. The player's bonus multiplier at the end of the current ball is carried over to the start of the next one.
- Warp Factor 6: Return Lanes Are Lit. The left inlane starts Hurry Up, a bonus score that counts down from 50 million points to 10 million points, and is collected by shooting the right loop. The right inlane starts Super Spinner, in which the spinner awards 10 million points per spin for a limited time; rolling the ball through the inlane again resets the timer.
- Warp Factor 7: Double Spinner. This doubles the base value for each turn of the spinner; maxing at 255,000 points [25,500,000 if Warp Factor 4 is active].
- Warp Factor 8: Extra Ball Lit. This award is collected by shooting the Start Mission Scoop.
- Warp Factor 9: Starts Warp Factor 9 mode. The goal in this mode is to shoot the left loop and/or the Delta Quadrant to advance the level in increments of 0.1 (Warp 9.1, Warp 9.2, etc.), until the engine maxes out at Warp Factor 9.9. Each increment awards points, starting at 20 million with Warp 9.1, and increasing 5 million per increment, maxing out at 60 million points once Warp 9.9 is reached. The player has 10 seconds to make each shot, as counted down by Geordi La Forge. This mode ends when the player drains the ball, fails to make a shot before time runs out, or reaches Warp 9.9; afterward, the warp factor resets to 1.

If the player chooses the "Warp Factor 4" option before plunging the ball, the awards for Warp Factors 2, 3, and 4 all go into effect.

Once Warp Factor 9 mode has been played for the first time, the following changes go into effect:

- The "Warp Factor 4" plunger option changes to "Warp Factor 2," awarding 5 million if chosen.
- Reaching Warp Factor 8 awards an artifact (see "Missions" above) instead of lighting an extra ball.
- The left ramp no longer advances the warp factor, but does remain in play for Warp Factor 9 mode.
- If the player locks a ball during Warp Factor 9 mode, the "Warp Factor 4" option changes to award an increment of 0.1 and the corresponding points.

=== Neutral Zone ===
Three targets plus a hole in front of the middle one. Shoot the targets three times to light one of the following three missions at random (announced by Worf), then shoot the hole to start it.

- Ferengi: A multiball that starts with two balls in play. Each shot to the Neutral Zone within the first 10 seconds adds one ball, to a maximum of four. The Start Mission scoop awards a jackpot that starts at 10 million times the number of balls in play, and every hit to the left bank of stand-up targets adds 2 million to the jackpot to a maximum of 70 million.
- Romulan: Three Romulan Warbirds will appear (left orbit, Alpha Quadrant ramp and Beta Quadrant ramp) which the player can force to cloak by shooting the corresponding shot. The mission goal is to cloak all ships simultaneously for a 30 million award. Hitting any of the righthand "Klingon Assistance" targets brings a Klingon Bird-of-prey out of cloak, thus blocking one of the Warbirds (first hit blocks the left orbit ship, second the Beta Quadrant ramp ship; the Alpha Quadrant ramp is never "blocked") and expediting completion of the goal.
- Cardassian: A two-ball multiball in which a jackpot can be collected by shooting any Neutral Zone target. The value of the jackpot depends on the shield strength of the Enterprise as follows:
  - Shields at 100%: 50 Million
  - Shields at 83%: 30 Million
  - Shields at 66%: 25 Million
  - Shields at 50%: 20 Million
  - Shields at 33%: 15 Million
  - Shields at 17%: 10 Million
  - Shields at 0%: 5 Million

During this mission, a Cardassian ship occasionally fires at the Enterprise, damaging its shields and reducing the jackpot. As with Borg Multiball (see below), shots to the spinner repair the shields and raise the jackpot.

=== Borg Multiball ===
All hits of the upper playfield pop bumpers increase the base "Borg Jackpot" amount awarded in Borg Multiball mode. To start the mode, and thus the battle with the Borg ship, the player needs to lock three balls. Locks are lit by shooting the right orbit (or selecting "Light Lock" on the start of a ball). Then shoot the right orbit again (or — if either or both are lit — the Delta Quadrant ramp or the Neutral Zone) to lock a ball. The player will then either hear the Borg tell Picard, "If you do not surrender now, you will be destroyed!", or, Picard will announce, "Send to Starfleet: we have engaged the Borg!"

After locking the third ball, Multiball will start with one ball placed into the left cannon and the "Start Mission" hole lit. Shooting the hole damages the Borg Ship and scores the Jackpot. A second hit will score a Double Jackpot, and a third hit destroys the Borg ship and scores the Triple Jackpot. In addition, each cannon shot in the "Start Mission" hole adds 10 million points to the Jackpot. After a Triple Jackpot, levels reset to Single Jackpot, allowing for multiple Triple Jackpots.

The full Multiball mode will start as soon as the player misses a cannon shot or after scoring the Triple Jackpot from the cannon shot, where Picard will call out "All hands, prepare for Multiball!" During Multiball, "Start Mission" will score cycling Jackpot/Double Jackpot/Triple Jackpot and the left ramp a Triple Jackpot. As the Enterprise is being shot at by the Borg, the "Shields" will drop in strength (from one to three units as with the Cardassian Neutral Zone Mission above). "Start Mission" Jackpots will be unlit as soon as the Shields reach 0%. By hitting the spinner in the left orbit, the shields are rebuilt and the "Start Mission" Jackpot is reactivated.

If a player scores a Triple Jackpot from the Delta Quadrant ramp, the Borg will automatically open fire on the Enterprise and the ball will shoot out of the Borg ship. Any jackpots scored through the "Start Mission" pocket will remain claimed, i.e. if the player has scored a Jackpot and a Double Jackpot, and scores a Triple Jackpot via the Delta Quadrant ramp, sinking the ball through the "Start Mission" pocket will award a Triple Jackpot.

Should the player score at least one Triple Jackpot during the multiball, at the end of the game during the Match Game, the player will hear this dialogue from Picard: "Captain's Log, supplemental: The crew performed admirably in dispatching the Borg threat."

=== Ranks ===
Light all three multiplier lanes (above the jet bumpers) to advance bonus and light Advance in Rank at the upper left sinkhole. Ranks add to the end-of-ball bonus count as follows:

- Ensign: 5 million (player starts the game with this rank)
- Lieutenant: 10 million
- Lieutenant Commander: 15 million
- Commander: 20 million
- Captain: 25 million

Once the player reaches Captain, a successful Advance in Rank shot awards an immediate 100 million.

== High Score Lists ==
Star Trek: The Next Generation is the only pinball machine to feature three separate high score lists. At the end of a game, the player may receive a "buy-in" extra ball in exchange for one credit, either by inserting coins or by using a credit already on the machine. The maximum number of buy-ins per game can be set by the machine operator.

The high scores are classified as follows:

- Honor Roll: The highest scores with no more than one buy-in.
- Officer's Club: The highest scores with two or more buy-ins.
- Q Continuum: Scores of 10 billion or higher, with any number of buy-ins.
- Grand Champion: Highest score of all with no more than one buy-in; separate from the other lists.

If a player makes the Officer's Club or Honor Roll, or is Grand Champion, Worf will say, "You are an honorable player!"

== Heritage ==
If a particular flipper combination is entered before launching a ball then all the logos of Steve Ritchie's prior pinball machines are shown, ending with the logo for this machine. These are Airborne Avenger (1977), Superman (1979), Flash (1979), Stellar Wars (1979), Firepower (1980), Black Knight (1980), Hyperball (1981), High Speed (1986), F-14 Tomcat (1987), Black Knight 2000 (1989), Rollergames (1990), Terminator 2: Judgment Day (1991), and The Getaway: High Speed II (1992). Similar to Pat Lawlor's hidden list of his prior games in The Twilight Zone seven months earlier this is something most players would miss.

== Release and reception ==
The game was well received at the 1993 AMOA Expo, and was promoted with actors in Klingon and Borg costumes. It was the last Williams pinball machine to sell over 10,000 units.

=== Awards ===
Williams won the ACME award for best pinball of 1994 with this machine, and won an AAMA diamond award.

== Digital versions ==
After a successful kickstarter in 2012 to raise funding for the third party licenses released for The Pinball Arcade for several platforms in 2013. The table was delisted with the loss of the Williams license on June 30, 2018.

An improved version with optional animations released on August 24, 2023, for Pinball FX. As part of a wider agreement, 3 more Star Trek tables released later the same year, with one of each based on the Kelvin timeline, Deep Space Nine, and Star Trek: Discovery.

In April 2025, an official VR and AR version of the table was released for the Meta Quest as part of Pinball FX VR. This is the first time the Star Trek: The Next Generation table has been available in virtual reality and augmented reality. The release includes enhanced 3D visuals and interactive room environments tailored for VR gameplay. AR mode allows players to project the table into the room via passthrough on a realistic scale in the Meta Quest 3. This table was launched alongside other licensed tables.
