= Hyperball (arcade game) =

1981 arcade machine

- middle pages of advertising flyer
- Manufacturer: Williams
- Release date: December 1981
- System: Williams System 7
- Model #: 509
- Players: 1-2
- Design: Steve Ritchie
- Programming: Ed Suchocki
- Artwork: Seamus McLaughlin
- Sound: Tim Murphy
- Production run: 5,000

Hyperball is a 1981 rolling ball arcade machine designed by Steve Ritchie and released by Williams. While it uses a pinball cabinet and some components found in a pinball machine it is not generally considered a pinball machine. The gameplay is similar to arcade video games, with elements of it inspired by Space Invaders and other video games. On release, trade journals and others struggled to categorize it.

== Design ==
Larry DeMar said the game was developed in response to the dip in popularity of pinball. The game was unveiled at the 1981 AMOA (Amusement & Music Operators Association) show.

The game was designed with micro-switches and opto-switches in critical areas, and the playfield was constructed out of wear-resistant plexiglass to aid the durability of the machine.

The gun-firing mechanism is called the hyper-cannon and can fire 0.75" diameter steel balls at a rate of up to 250 per minute. The plunger mechanism in this gun required frequent replacement. An Archimedes screw is used to return drained balls to the top of the magazine; this magazine is a channel extending up the left side of the machine.

This is the first Williams game to use an alphanumeric display, but the first Williams pinball machine to use them was High Speed in 1986. This display is located within the playfield, with two numeric displays for players scores in the backbox.

The game is predominantly red and black. The backbox design is shorter than used on prior Williams pinball machines.

== Layout ==
The layout is shown in a 1981 sketch of the playfield by designer Steve Ritchie. The apron of the machine has two player-controlled trigger guns, with a bomb button on the middle of the apron. An array of 23 holes and targets are arranged around the edges of the playfield, labelled in alphabetical order A-Z, omitting Q, X, and Z. In Ritchie's sketch there is an alphanumeric display in the playfield, with a "base" located just above it; in production machines this was renamed to "energy center".

== Gameplay ==
Unlike a pinball machine the game has no flippers, and uses two pivoting trigger mechanisms to control the rotating hyper-cannon. A color booklet was produced by Williams called "Hyper-Tactics" with instructions how to play the game. The player has unlimited time, and unlimited balls. On factory settings players could choose to play a game with two energy centers for 25c, or a game with five energy centers for 50c. Lights progress up the targets at the side of the machine, and if they reach the top before the players shoots them they turn into lightning bolts at the top of the playfield and fall towards the energy center; each of these hitting the energy center drains it of one energy unit, from an initial five energy units. In addition there is a "baiter" which can move from side to side while firing energy bolts, and completely drains energy if it hits the energy center. Spelling the word shown on the alphanumeric display awards the player additional energy units, points, or a Z-bomb. Activating a Z-bomb using the button on the apron eliminates all enemies on the playfield when it is used. The game consists of a series of waves, each of which ends after 30 bolts have been hit. Every fifth wave is called a "reflex wave". In these waves the player attempts to hit a series of 20 targets to get an added bonus.

== Competing game ==
In April 1982, Bally released a game called Rapid Fire, which uses a similar ball firing mechanism to Hyperball. It was first publicly shown at a trade show in March 1982. Internally, Williams called this "Operation Xerox".

Williams took legal action in Illinois against Bally in April 1982 over perceived similarities between artwork on Hyperball and Rapid Fire. The concept of a player shooting balls at advancing enemies was declared to not be copyrightable, with the only elements of the game protected under copyright the artwork, and exterior configuration. The court found there to be no "substantial similarity" between the artwork on the two games.

== Hybrid game ==
In October 1981 at the AMOA show it was described by Play Meter as an innovative hybrid of a pinball body and rapid-fire gun. When Play Meter saw a production machine in early 1982 they questioned if it was a pingame or a video game as it uses a "pinball style cabinet with many video game features", calling the article "Third kind of pingame". In his review, Roger Sharpe considered if it should be called a "trig-vid" or other hybrid name, or a gun game referring to the manufacturer J. F. Franz, who manufactured a few arcade pistol machines over several decades. In the legal case, the filing referred to it as a "rolling ball arcade game", with the opinion drawing attention to the game having both pinball and video game features. In 2023 Ken Horowitz called it "something not entirely pinball but wasn't exactly a video game either".

The advertising flyer for the machine called it "A game encounter of the 3rd kind" with an image alluding to Close Encounters of the Third Kind. This flyer also shows the game evolving from the merger of Black Knight and Defender.

The game uses the concept of waves of moving aliens from Space Invaders and the idea of a fixed base from Missile Command. The game designer wanted the game to "simulate the fast-shooting action" of space themed video games. The "reflex waves" are used like the bonus stages in video games such as Galaga as an opportunity for the player to score major points.

== Reception ==
In a combined review of Hyperball and Rapid Fire for Play Meter, Roger Sharpe awarded this machine 4/4. It was viewed more as an interactive arcade video game than as an evolution of pinball. It was highlighted that it should be placed separately at locations, and not in a line-up of pinball machines. Writing for Electronic Games, Sharpe noted the similarity to invasion-type videogames, and recommended it as a "total entertainment package" to both pinball and video game players.

In Play Meter's Equipment poll they noted that on average each machine was generating $109 per week in the United States in October 1982, including its earnings in a list of pinball machines. RePlay similarly categorized the game under "flippers" in its rankings.

Williams set initial sales forecasts for this machine at 50,000 units. While distributors and operators were initially impressed, players found the game too complicated, and operators found it too unreliable in use. Williams discontinued production after 5,000 machines, the last of which were sold at steep discounts. An excessive number of cabinets and backboxes had already been produced. These were repurposed and used on subsequent pinball machines Defender, Time Fantasy, and Firepower II. A similar machine, called Spellbinder, was designed by Barry Oursler, but never released by Williams due to the lower than expected sales of Hyperball.
