= Space Shuttle (pinball) =

1984 pinball machine

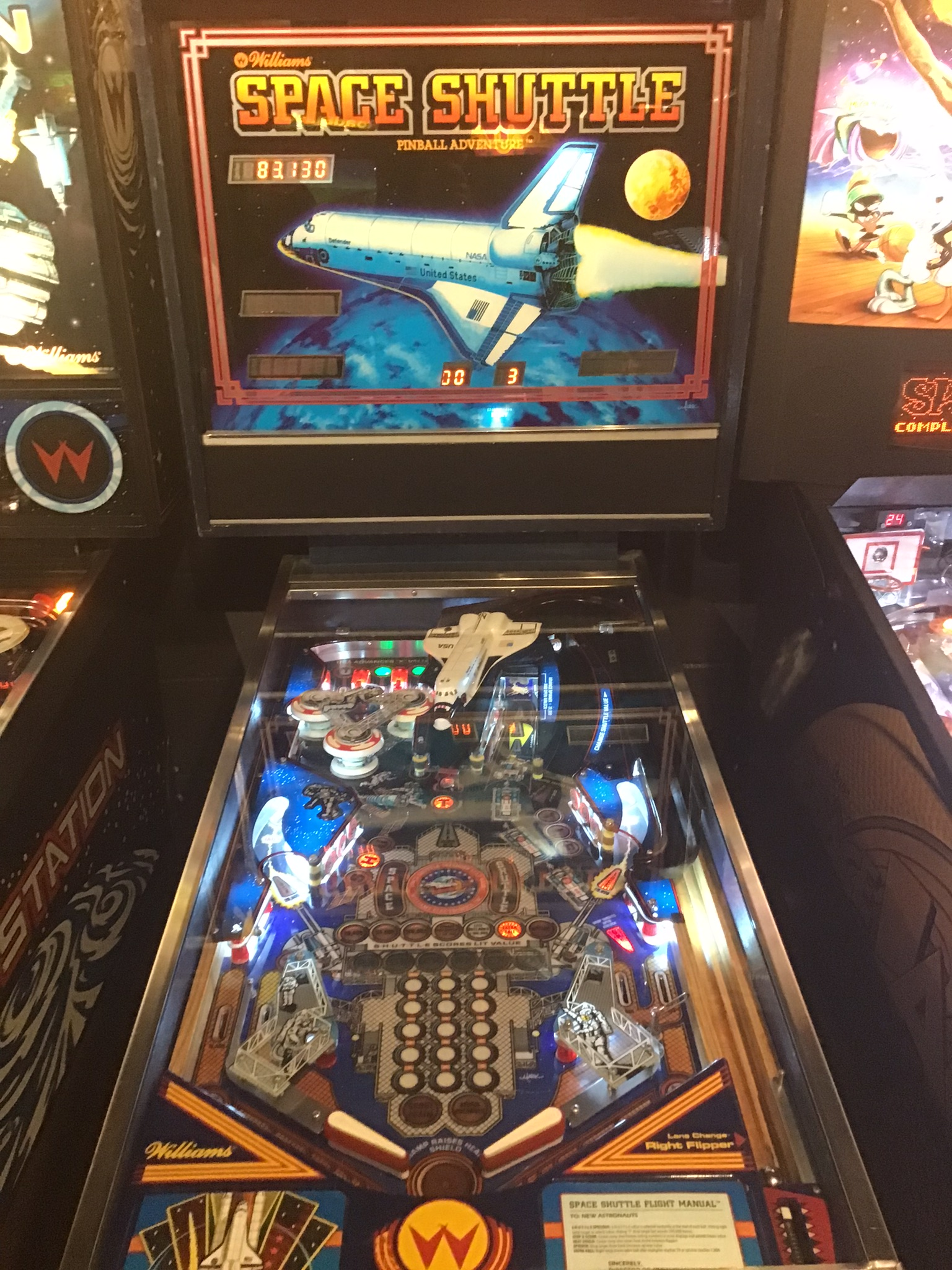
- Manufacturer: Williams Electronics
- Release date: December 1984
- System: Williams System 9
- Design: Barry Oursler, Joe Kaminkow
- Programming: Larry DeMar
- Artwork: Mark Sprenger
- Sound: Eugene Jarvis, Bill Parod
- Voices: Steve Ritchie
- Concept: Joe Kaminkow
- Production run: 7,000

Space Shuttle (subtitled: Pinball Adventure) is a Space Shuttle themed pinball machine designed by Barry Oursler and Joe Kaminkow and produced in 1984 by Williams Electronics. A sequel called Space Station was released in 1987.

It is the third pinball machine of the same name, after Sega's 1977 machine, and Zaccaria's 1980 machine.

It was of critical importance to Williams. After a series of commercial failures of pinball machines, Lou Nicastro, president of Williams had said the pinball division would be closed if this machine didn't secure 1,900 orders by the end of 1984. This followed a failed tentative agreement to sell this division to Bally in 1983, during a time the arcade game part of the company was performing even worse than pinball.

== Design ==
In 1984 after a series of commercial failures the pinball designers at Williams were told by management that the next game had to be a "blockbuster" or else pinball production would be eliminated. The most promising layout was one designed by Barry Oursler, and the concept of "Space Shuttle" had already been suggested by Joe Kaminkow and Larry DeMar.

Joe Kaminkow contacted NASA and obtained permission to use the name.

On the backglass, the space shuttle is named "Defender". A symbol with a lower case "a" with a lightning bolt through it is on the shuttle on the backglass, reminiscent of the designation of bombers used in the Manhattan Project. The side of the cabinet has the name of the game in large lettering, with a mission patch. The artwork was designed by Mark Sprenger and the numbers on the shuttle transporters on the playfield - A8, W11, S81 - spell the initials of his son and birthdate. This is the first game Mark Sprenger worked on, having never even played pinball before.

Eugene Jarvis worked on the sounds for the game while at Stanford, in California. Also in California, Steve Ritchie voiced the speech, which used a different board for playback since the standard System 9 design doesn't include it.

Appealing to operators on its advertising flyers it used the marketing slogans "The profit launcher for all locations!" and "The fastest way to make your earnings really take off!".

== Layout ==
Either side of the machine has a kick-out saucer used to lock balls. The top left of the machine has U-S-A rollovers above three pop bumpers. Two banks of three targets spell S-H-U and T-L-E, with the final T on the drop-target at the entrance to the center ramp. A model of a Space Shuttle is located above the center plastic molded ramp; this ramp exits on the right side of the machine. To the right of this ramp is a lane with a spinner which leads back to the upper rollovers. To the right of this is a dead-end right ramp with a target at the end.

The ball saver is called the "heat shield" is an up-post between the flippers.

== Gameplay ==
The game is controlled with two flippers and has a manual plunger. In Space Shuttle the main goal is to acquire the shuttle score value from spelling S-H-U-T-T-L-E by hitting six stand up targets and one drop target, or by using the lit inlanes (if available). The player is then given one of seven awards which are displayed in the middle of the playfield.

After the "T" drop-target is hit, the player can collect a "stop and score" by quickly hitting the center ramp.

When the U-S-A rollovers are completed the bonus multiplier advances up to a maximum of 7X; the player can control which of these lanes are lit with a flipper. After locking a ball in either of the locks, the player can start a two ball multiball by shooting the ball up the center ramp or attempt to start a three ball multiball by locking another ball first. In multiplayer games, balls locked by one player can be used by another player.

== Reception ==
After its success at the October AMOA show, which was characterized as exciting as Dave Rockola's 1930s hits Jig Saw and World Fair; with sufficient orders secured by the end of 1984 to guarantee the factory would remain open, and by February 1985 testing by distributors had proven the game to be a hit.

In a review for Play Meter, Roger Sharpe awarded the game 4/4, and credited the whole of the design team for "bringing some extra life back into pinball". In an October 1985 article he questioned if there was a rebirth of pinball, with some operators reluctant to invest in new machines, but concluded "pinball might be on the verge of recapturing the confidence of operators, distributors, and players".

The earnings of the game were much higher than recent games, and it won the Amusement & Music Operators Association award for the most-played pinball machine in 1985.

== Legacy ==
Space Shuttle marked a turning point for Williams, Barry Oursler's prior games sold extremely poorly: Time Fantasy - 608, Joust - 402 and Star Light - 100. Those after Space Shuttle had commercial success Comet - 8,100, Grand Lizard - 2,750 and Pin-Bot - 12,001.

The "phenomenal success" of this machine was followed with a series of successful machines including Comet, High Speed, and F-14 Tomcat.

== Digital versions ==
Space Shuttle released in Pinball Hall of Fame: The Williams Collection on several systems between 2008 and 2011. It was released by the same developer for The Pinball Arcade in 2013, and it was available until June 30, 2018, when all Williams tables were removed due to licensing issues.
