= Space Station (pinball) =

1987 pinball machine

- front of advertising flyer
- Manufacturer: Williams Electronics
- Release date: December 1987
- System: Williams system 11B
- Design: Barry Oursler
- Programming: Ed Boon
- Artwork: Tim Elliot
- Music: Brian Schmidt
- Sound: Brian Schmidt
- Voices: Steve Ritchie (Mission control)
- Production run: 3,804

Space Station is a 1987 Williams pinball machine designed by Barry Oursler.

It is the sequel to 1984's Space Shuttle by the same designer, and a few features from that game are used in this.

== Design ==
The backglass is dominated by the space station, which also shows three space shuttles, and an astronaut. The game is subtitled pinball rendezvous on the backglass. A variety of astronauts and shuttles are shown on the playfield. The shuttles are called "Defender" and "Liberty".

In the playfield artwork underneath the diverter assembly in the lane that goes to the right ball lock is a monolith from 2001: A Space Odyssey.

This is the first game that Brian Schmidt composed all the music and sound effects for.

== Layout ==
A wireform from the plunger lane leads to a small upper playfield with 1-2-3 rollovers. Below these are U-S-A rollovers and three pop bumpers. The game has no inlanes, and includes a kickback mechanism in the left outlane; this design enabled a larger number of shots in the lower part of the playfield. Seven S-T-A-T-I-O-N targets are on the left side of the machine, and two more banks of targets spell S-H-U-T-T-L-E. The revolving space station mechanism at the top right of the machine can redirect balls to lock them in place. The only ramp on the machine leads to this mechanism; in front of the entrance to this ramp is a drop-target.

== Gameplay ==
The game is controlled with two flippers, and has a manual plunger.

The game is based on docking two space shuttles with the space station by completing 1-2-3 and locking balls, and then scoring jackpots by redocking them. The general illumination changes from white to green during multiball, called "condition green".

Similar to the feature in Space Shuttle, hitting the drop target in front of the right ramp followed by the ramp awards "stop & score" points.

Completing the S-T-A-T-I-O-N or S-H-U-T-T-L-E targets awards the player one of the rewards shown on the center of the playfield.

After the players last ball is lost, a time-limited bonus ball can be played.

== Reception ==
Play Meter called it "a fine addition to the Williams line".

== Digital versions ==
Space Station released on October 20, 2020, for Pinball FX3 as part of Williams volume 6. A remastered version released for Pinball FX on June 30, 2022.

== In popular media ==
The game was used in the debut single of Imani Coppola, "Legend of a Cowgirl". It was also briefly used in Fargo (1996), and Big Daddy.
