= Jungle Lord =

1981 pinball machine

- Jungle Lord flyer
- Manufacturer: Williams Pinball
- Release date: February 1981
- System: Williams System 7
- Design: Barry Oursler
- Programming: Larry DeMar, Paul Dussault
- Artwork: Constantino Mitchell
- Production run: 6,000

Jungle Lord is a 1981 pinball machine designed by Barry Oursler and produced by Williams pinball. It features a Tarzan influenced theme, a two-level playfield and a magnetic ball saver ("Magna Save").

== Design and layout ==
Jungle Lord is the second of the four two-level System 7 games that Williams produced in 1980/1, the others being Black Knight, Pharaoh and Solar Fire.

The design of the upper playfield is similar to Black Knight, but incorporates a "self-contained mini bagatelle style 'chamber' playfield, found on the top left-hand corner", with four lanes that spell L-O-R-D. The lower playfield includes a bank of three drop-targets and two bulls-eye targets. The upper and lower playfields each have two flippers.

The early production of the game had a red cabinet, and around 100 units were made. The later ones had a blue cabinet and the tiger artwork was slightly changed.

== Gameplay ==
The game is controlled with two buttons on each side of the cabinet, one on each side for the flippers, and the other to control the magna-save.

A primary feature is a timed multiball which starts after the player completes the L-O-R-D lanes.

The game includes an innovative scoring feature called "Double Trouble", a drop target feature that engages when the player hits the five drop-targets on the upper playfield.

Unlike on the predecessor Black Knight, the magna-save is activated by the player for up to 5 time units earned from hitting various targets, rather than for a fixed period of time.

== Reception ==
In a review for Play Meter, Roger Sharpe rated the game at 2.75/4, finding the graphics to be bold and colorful, and the game to be a difficult but satisfying experience.

== Gallery ==
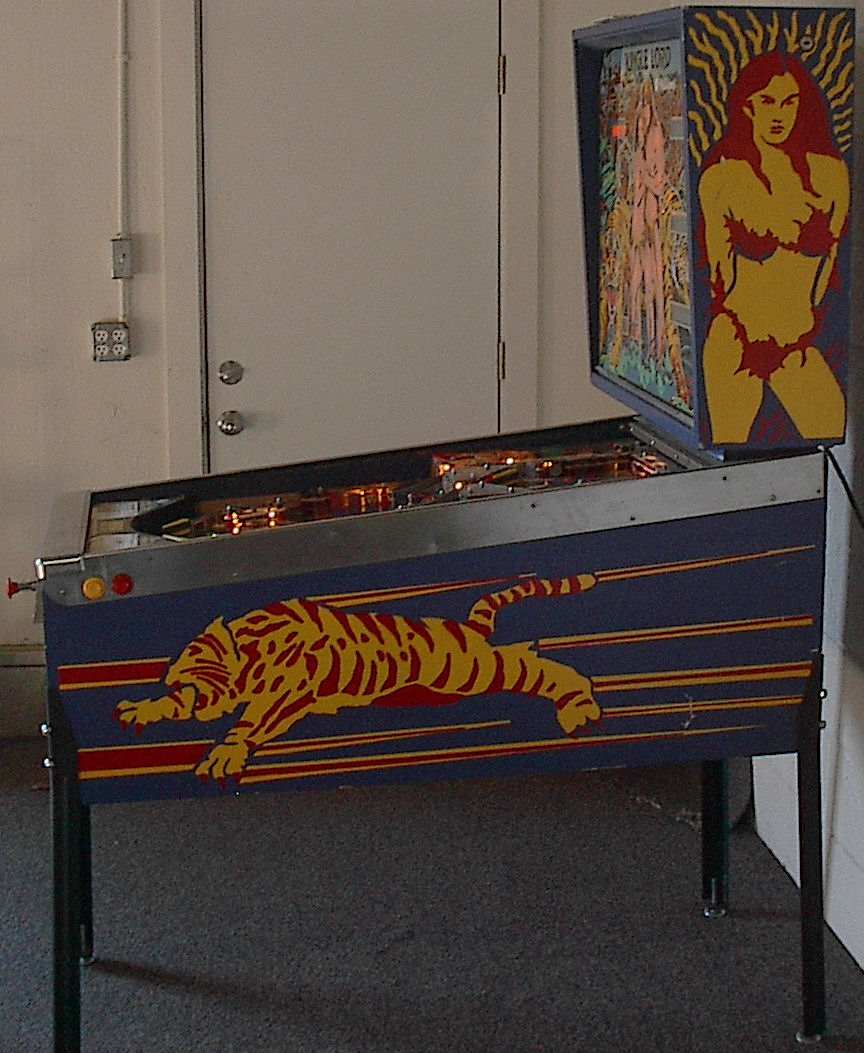
Side view of the machine
