= Flash Gordon (pinball) =

1981 pinball machine

- Flash Gordon flyer
- Manufacturer: Bally
- Release date: February 1981
- System: Bally MPU AS-2518-35
- Design: Claude Fernandez
- Programming: Rehman Merchant
- Artwork: Kevin O'Connor
- Production run: 10,000 units

Flash Gordon is a pinball machine that was produced by Bally and released in February 1981.

== Flash Gordon film ==
The game is based on the "Flash Gordon" character and stories of comics, film and television. It was produced to coincide and promote the December 1980 film Flash Gordon and was shown on NBC Today with Max Von Sydow (Ming the Merciless) playing the game. The backglass uses in-character likenesses of the main cast of the film including Ming the Merciless, Flash Gordon, and Dale Arden. The artist created an original montage from watching the film, and from a small booklet of images. The artist chose to primarily use red and black because these are the colors of Flash Gordon's insignia and clothing.

== Design and layout ==
It is the first split-level pinball machine from Bally, although the playfield was wired as if it were one; due to the additional height the playfield was mounted lower in the cabinet than other contemporary games. The higher level playfield is stylised as Ming's palace which can be reached from either ramp. Both of these ramps have a spinner at the bottom entrance. There is a third flipper, three drop targets, and a single pop bumper in this area, with a single drop target above. The main (lower level) playfield contains two pop bumpers towards the top, a bank of 4 drop targets on the left, and three in-line drop targets on the right. Between the playfields is a kick-out hole which can launch the ball in either direction.

Flash Gordon pinball machine at Play Expo Blackpool 2025

It is also the first game to use the "Squawk and Talk" sound board. It was the second production Bally game with speech (Bally's 1980 Xenon was the first, utilizing a crude 'vocalizer' board set). This is the only Bally game to use a strobe flasher in the backbox; this is located behind the backglass between "Flash" and "Gordon". Due to customer complaints this was removed part way through the production run, so later games do not have this feature. The game has 2 speakers, one is used for voice, and the other for computerized sound.

== Gameplay ==
The ball launches into the higher playfield, with the single drop target raising after the ball has entered play. Bonus points (awarded when a ball drains) are independently collected from the two levels of the playfield, with bonus multipliers up to 3X awarded from the in-line drop targets, and bonus multiplier of up to 5X available from the upper and lower banks of drop targets in turn.

== Reception ==
Roger Sharpe reviewed the machine in Play Meter, rating it at 4/4. The integration of the artwork was praised, it was also noted that the score display has 7 digits. Setting the game to 25c per game was recommended for operators.
