= No Fear: Dangerous Sports =

1995 pinball machine

- Manufacturer: Williams
- Release date: 1995
- System: Williams WPC-Security
- Design: Steve Ritchie, Dwight Sullivan, Matt Coriale, Greg Freres
- Programming: Matt Coriale
- Artwork: Greg Freres
- Mechanics: Carl Biagi
- Music: Dan Forden
- Sound: Dan Forden
- Voices: Steve Ritchie (Skull); Greg Freres (Announcer)
- Animation: Scott Slomiany
- Production run: 4,540

No Fear: Dangerous Sports is a 1995 pinball game designed by Steve Ritchie and released by Williams. It is based on the clothing line. This game has an extreme sports theme and features skydiving, free climbing, water skiing, extreme skiing, supercross and NASCAR racing. This is the last game Steve Ritchie designed for Williams.

== Design and layout ==
No Fear is the first completely CAD designed pinball game designed by Steve Ritchie after he learned CAD to speed up the design process, completing it in 5.5 months.

Initial games were produced with a hole in the playfield to place a post. After testing it was decided not to use a post, and the hole is filled with a plug.

The game includes magnets used both as an accelerator and as a divider.

A central feature of the game is the talking skull, with speech written by and performed by Steve Ritchie and Greg Freres. Around this skull is a ramp hit using the upper flipper; this ramp includes a gap that the ball can jump across. Another ramp goes in the other direction around the skull.

Animations on the dot matrix display include Jeremy McGrath, Glen Plake, and Dan Osman. The eyes on the backglass are the designer, Steve Ritchie.

== Launch options ==
Before launching each ball from the plunger, the player may choose one of five awards with the flipper buttons. Unless otherwise noted, the ball is launched through the Skydive lane and another one is fed into the right inlane from the right scoop. The choices are:

- Start Challenge: Starts lit challenge. Not available if two balls are locked for multiball, or if the player has completed all five main challenges.
- Super Cross Level: Advances the ramps towards Payback Time.
- Ball Lock: Ball is locked for multiball. Up to two balls can be locked in this way.
- Advance Raceway: Advances the Raceway (inner horseshoe lane).
- Flipper Skill Shot: Shoot the left ramp for 50 million points.

== Challenges ==
The goal in this game is to complete the five main challenges in order to qualify for the Major Challenges:

- Dirt Challenge: Shoot the ramps and the upper loop for points, starting at 5 million and increasing by 5 million for every lit shot made to a maximum of 20 million. This mode lasts for 25 seconds.
- Asphalt Challenge: Shoot the Skull or the Raceway arrows three times in 25 seconds to score 50/75/100 million.
- Water Challenge: All shots are initially lit for 10 million. Shooting the Tube saucer increases the value by 5 million (up to a maximum of 30 million) and adds 10 more seconds to the mode timer, which starts at 30 seconds and cannot be increased beyond this amount.
- Snow Challenge: The Downhill is initially lit for 50 million, and a 30-second timer starts. The Jump Ramp and Summit each add 10 million to the value, to a maximum of 100 million. Shooting the Downhill once collects the value and ends the mode.
- Air Challenge: A hurry-up countdown begins at the Skydive, starting at 25 million and decreasing to 10 million. Shooting the Skydive collects the value and lights all arrows to collect it again. If the countdown times out, the player scores 10 million and all arrows are set to that value. The mode ends after 30 seconds have elapsed or all arrows have been shot, with the latter awarding a bonus of 75 million.

=== Major Challenges ===
After completing the main challenges, one major challenge becomes lit at a time, in the sequence shown below. The first one can be immediately started by shooting the Skull, but the player must spell "NO FEAR" by making loop/ramp shots in order to light each of the others and then shoot the Skull to start it.

- No Limits: A three-ball multiball with a 15-second ball saver. All shots are initially lit for 20 million; each one made adds 1 million, to a maximum of 70 million.
- Fear Fest: A three-ball multiball with a 25-second ball saver. The Fear Fest Jackpot is set to 80 million and increases by 20 million for every lit shot made. Shooting the Skull or Skydive collects the jackpot and resets it to 20 million, and four lit shots are required to relight it.
- Meet Your Maker: A four-ball multiball with a 20-second ball saver. All targets award 250,000, and every major scoring option is lit or maxed out. In addition, the Skull and Jump Ramp award 50 million and 200 million, respectively.

A code for use in Mortal Kombat 3 could be found while playing the game.

== Reception ==
Play Meter liked the flipper response, and found it to be a fast game due to the game having no bumpers, and an open lower playfield.

== Digital version ==
No Fear: Dangerous Sports released for The Pinball Arcade for several platforms in November 2015, and delisted on June 30, 2018 after WMS license expiration. Valvoline logos are replaced by those for No Fear, and other brands such as Ford, Cummins and Goodyear are converted to fictional ones. Mentions of athletes associated with the sports featured in the game, including water-skier Sammy Duvall and NASCAR driver Robby Gordon, are edited out of the announcer's remarks that precede the main challenges.
