= F-14 Tomcat (pinball) =

1987 pinball machine

- Manufacturer: Williams
- Release date: March 1987
- System: Williams System 11A
- Design: Steve Ritchie
- Programming: Eugene Jarvis, Ed Boon
- Artwork: Doug Watson
- Mechanics: Craig Fitpold
- Music: Steve Ritchie, Chris Granner
- Sound: Bill Parod, Chris Granner
- Voices: Mark Ritchie (Hitman); Steve Ritchie (General Yagov)
- Production run: 14,502

F-14 Tomcat is a pinball machine designed by Steve Ritchie and released by Williams Electronics in 1987. It features an F-14 Tomcat and was advertised with the slogan "It's fast. It's furious. AND IT FIGHTS BACK!". The game expands on some design elements used in Ritchie's previous game, High Speed.

F-14 Tomcat, including three beacons

== Design ==
F-14 Tomcat is the immediate successor to High Speed, with "speed" an important part of the design principle.

In an interview Steve Ritchie described F-14 Tomcat as "the kind of game that could send players stomping off in a wave of expletives - all the way to the cash change machine to try again".

Eugene Jarvis returned to Williams to restart and lead Williams' video game division, but spent four months working on this game first. Ed Boon completed the remainder of the programming.

Steve Ritchie approached Doug Watson to create the artwork for an air combat game with the name F-111. Due to Watson's brother working at Lockheed Martin he knew this was not primarily a fighter aircraft and suggested other names. After seeing Top Gun, Ritchie and Jarvis settled on naming the game after the F-14 Tomcat which features heavily in the film. The backglass shows a dogfight with an exploding MiG, and two victorious F-14's near it; with a fleet of ships shown in the ocean below.

The development of the game used the principle "bigger and better" to improve of the design of High Speed. High Speed has a 3-ball multiball, so this game uses a 4-ball multiball. From a single rotating beacon light on top of High Speed this uses three beacons - red, white, and blue - representing American colors.

A new algorithm using the System 11 sound hardware was written by Bill Parod to make the pre-ball-launch sound like a fighter jet getting ready to launch from a flight deck. Steve Ritchie voiced General Yagov, and Mark Ritchie voiced the American pilot.

The game took 14 months to finish, but all its main features were completed after about 10 months.

playfield

== Layout ==
The game includes two flippers and slingshots towards the bottom of the playfield. Either side of the lower playfield each has three targets T-O-M, and C-A-T. In the middle of the playfield is an array of eight more targets. The focus of the design is in the top half of the playfield which contains a single pop-bumper in the centre, two more flippers, another set of T-O-M C-A-T targets, and several wireforms. The top right of the machine includes a vertical up-kicker which hits the ball into one of these wireforms. The top left of the machine includes the Yagov kicker which fires the ball back towards the player at high speed. There is a kick-back in the left outlane which can fire the ball towards the top part of the playfield.

== Gameplay ==
Players assume the role of a Navy pilot nicknamed Hitman with the goal to destroy the evil Russian General Yagov. This is achieved by destroying eight planes by hitting a variety of shots. By hitting the T-O-M-C-A-T targets the player can lock a ball, and after locking three balls can start a four ball multiball where jackpots can be scored. During multiball there is a siren and a lightshow including the three beacons on top of the machine.

The game includes a ball save, called "flight insurance". This is the first game to include this feature which was regularly used in subsequent games.

Achieving a high score plays the United States Navy anthem, "Anchors Aweigh".

== Reception ==
The game was shown at the ACME trade show in March 1987 and had a crowd for most of the event. An arcade operator held a seminar there where he stated that he expected earnings to be 1.5X that of Pin-Bot. The game won best of show awards.

In a review for Play Meter Roger Sharpe gave it a score of 3.75/4, calling it an ideal game for a skilled player, and challenging for other players.

Cash Box gave the game a very positive review, calling it "a total package that will appeal to all pinball enthusiasts of all skill levels." The review cited "the fastest shot in pinball" from the adversary, and commended the game's speech, music and flash lamp effects.

Top Score also cited the game as an example of Ritchie's quality work, saying that Ritchie "is responsible for a large part of the recent pinball resurgence."

Marco Rossignoli in The Complete Pinball Book says that F-14 Tomcat "is a prime example of how the world of pinball had evolved since the beginning of [the 1980s]," with the playfield dominated by ramps.

== Digital versions ==
F-14 Tomcat was one of 12 tables released on the arcade game UltraPin.

F-14 Tomcat was released for The Pinball Arcade for several platforms in 2015 and was available until June 30, 2018, when all Williams tables were removed due to licensing issues.
