= Airborne Avenger (pinball) =

1977 pinball machine

- Inside of advertising flyer
- Manufacturer: Atari, Inc.
- Release date: September 1977
- System: Atari Generation/System 1
- Design: Steve Ritchie
- Programming: Eugene Jarvis
- Artwork: George Opperman
- Sound: Eugene Jarvis
- Production run: 3,420

Airborne Avenger is a 1977 widebody pinball machine released by Atari, and is the first designed by Steve Ritchie.

== Design ==
While working as a technician at Atari, Steve Ritchie learned from Bob Jonesi who designed Atari's first pinball game, Atarians and began to design a game himself. After a rejection from his supervisor he took his idea to the head of Atari, Nolan Bushnell who gave him a space to work on the game.

The prototype for the game was then built in four weeks. Working as an engineer, Claude Fernandez assisted with the detailed layout and precise location of mechanical components.

Eugene Jarvis worked on the software for the game, including getting the lights to flash in sequence. When the game is not being played it has an attract mode where the lights give a show to attract potential players. The speaker plays different tones when various scores are collected by the player.

The backglass image was designed by George Opperman, who also created the Atari logo. Starlog described this image as a chisel faced man wearing sunglasses against a bald villain.

The score display is on the lower left of the playfield, and the boards controlling the game are contained in the main cabinet.

In common with other early Atari pinball machines, a Motorola 6800 processor was used, and the playfield was larger than other manufacturers.

== Gameplay ==
There are two main objectives for players: to hit various targets to advance the bonus score awarded at the end of a ball, and to spell AIRBORNE AVENGER by hitting various other targets.

== Reception ==
In a review for Play Meter Roger Sharpe awarded the game 3/4, finding it an improvement on Atari's two previous games, suggesting it would do better as a 5 ball game rather than a 3 ball game.

RePlay said it offered "target variety for every level of player expertise".

In 2014, Steve Ritchie described it as his worst game.
