= AC/DC (pinball) =

2012 pinball machine

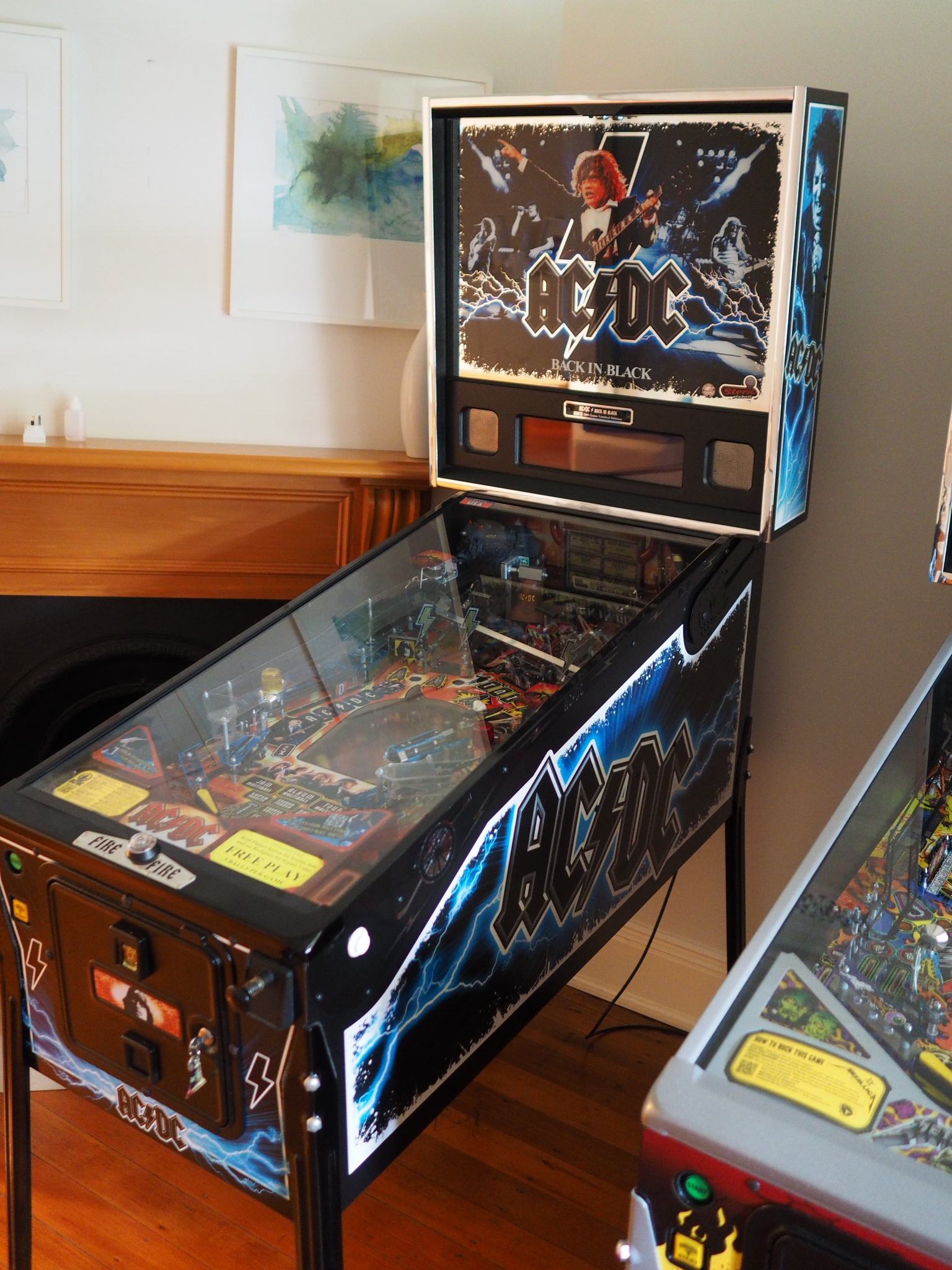
- AC/DC Back in Black edition.
- Manufacturer: Stern Pinball
- Release date: March 2012
- System: Stern S.A.M. Board System
- Design: Steve Ritchie
- Programming: Lyman Sheats
- Artwork: John Youssi & Charles Youssi
- Music: AC/DC
- Sound: David Thiel

AC/DC is a pinball machine manufactured by Stern Pinball based on the Australian band of the same name. Designed by Steve Ritchie, it was released on March 1, 2012.

== Design ==
The machine was confirmed in January 2012 with the release of a teaser video showcasing the game, along with the twelve songs involved in its soundtrack.

The music transfers to physical objects in the game, with “Hells Bells” and “Rock ‘n’ Roll Train” represented as a bell, and a train.

The swinging bell is involved in the Hells Bells mode, and a lower playfield in the Premium/LE editions is used for modes that use the word Hell in the song's title.

The backglass and cabinet of the Luci edition feature a purple-skinned woman, with the band members shown as silhouettes. The artwork on the lower playfield is also altered. The name of this edition is short for Lucifer.

== Gameplay ==
Each song is the subject of a mode, from which players can work towards a multi-ball for additional points.

== Reception ==
In a review for Play Meter the game was found to have an interesting mix of rules, and scored the game 3/4.

== Digital version ==
FarSight Studios launched a Kickstarter project on May 2, 2016, with plans to digitize the AC/DC pinball table for Stern Pinball Arcade; the announced funding goal was $108,435. Due to a new partnership with Oculus, this Kickstarter was canceled as it was no longer needed to fund the new table.

The Premium version and the two Limited Editions (Let There Be Rock and Back in Black) of the table are available on Stern Pinball Arcade across multiple platforms.

The license for the digital version expired on July 1, 2019, and was removed from purchase for any platform.

== AC/DC Remastered ==
AC/DC Remastered
- Manufacturer: Stern Pinball
- Release date: October 2026
- System: Spike 3
- Design: John Borg, Steve Ritchie
- Programming: Josh Henderson
- Artwork: Randy Martinez
- Music: AC/DC

In October 2026, Stern Pinball announced AC/DC Remastered. Designer John Borg made updates to the original Steve Ritchie-designed game including a redesigned lower playfield with two flippers and a ball firing cannon. The game features eight additional AC/DC songs that have been added to the original 2012 song list; the upgraded display shows concert footage and classic music videos. The game rules were updated to include new wizard modes. Stern produced two versions; Premium and a Limited Edition. The LE production quantity is limited to 500 units.
