= Charlie Emery =

American pinball podcaster and machine designer

- Born: August 16, 1969 (age 56)
- Occupation: Pinball Designer
- Years active: 7
- Employer: Spooky Pinball LLC
- Spouse: KT
- Children: 2
- Website: Spooky Pinball

Charlie Emery is a pinball podcaster and pinball machine designer from the United States. He runs Spooky Pinball.

== Career ==
Emery started with a retheme project of Godzilla based on a Williams Firepower II. He went on to design his own pinball machine called "pinball zombies from beyond the grave", which has been turned into a Rob Zombie themed pinball with updated layout. He currently runs a pinball company called Spooky Pinball, named after his podcast. Spooky Pinball finished manufacturing 150 units of America's Most Haunted designed by Benjamin Heckendorn as of January 2016.

Emery worked for Signcraft screen printing in Galena, IL from 1992-2013 before starting his pinball company. Many of the techniques he learned have carried over to pinball, including direct printing to playfields and cabinets. He has been podcasting since April 2010. He often has his family on, including his two kids (Corwin "Bug" Emery and Morgan "Squirrel" Emery) who do skits to advertise products, as well as pinball and horror related celebrities. In the past year, Charlie has handed the reins of the podcast over to his son bug, dubbing it the "bugcast". On the February 2021 podcast they announced that they would be shifting from podcasting to more video content.

A documentary, Things that go bump in the Night, was released in 2017 about the Emery family and how Spooky Pinball was created.

== Games Manufactured ==
- America's Most Haunted - Ben Heck designer (March 2014)
- Rob Zombie Spookshow International - Charlie Emery designer (February 2016)
- Domino's Spectacular Pizza Adventure- Adam Gacek & Charlie Emery designer (July 2016)
- Jetsons Pinball - contract manufacturer for The Pinball Company (March 2017)
- Total Nuclear Annihilation - Scott Danesi designer (August 2017)
  - Total Nuclear Annihilation CE Remake (September 2022)
- Alice Cooper's Nightmare Castle - Charlie Emery designer (April 2018)
- Rick and Morty - Scott Danesi designer (January 2020)
- Halloween - Group design (July 2021)
- Ultraman - Group design (July 2021)
- Scooby Doo (December 2022)
- Looney Tunes
- Texas Chainsaw Massacre
- Evil Dead (November 2024)
