= Rollergames (pinball) =

1990 pinball machine

- Manufacturer: Williams
- Release date: April 1990
- System: Williams System 11C
- Design: Steve Ritchie
- Programming: Mark Penacho
- Artwork: Pat McMahon, Linda Deal
- Mechanics: Carl Biagi
- Music: Dan Forden
- Sound: Dan Forden
- Production run: 5,000 (approximate)

Rollergames is a 1990 pinball machine designed by Steve Ritchie and released by Williams. It is based on the television series RollerGames.

== Design ==
The license for RollerGames was obtained by Roger Sharpe, after choosing between this and American Gladiators. The television show went off air as sample machines were being manufactured.

The game uses a 2-line alphanumeric display with the highest displayable score 99,999,990.

The playfield includes logos of Slice, Pepsi, Mug Root Beer, Thermos, ShareData, and GamePro which are paired with the RollerGames teams Bad Attitude, Maniacs, Violators, Rockers, Hot Flash, and T-Birds. These logos are also used on the backglass. This was the first Williams pinball machine to use paid for third-party advertising; the possibility of using advertising on the score display in future games was in the developmental stage. Williams was also one of the sponsors of RollerGames, with advertising banners appearing in the background of the program.

The artwork on the translite show the T-Birds and the Rockers, including the T-Bird twins, Jennifer and Kristine Van Galder. Manager of the Violators, Chuck Skull, is shown prominently on the playfield.

== Layout ==
A photo of Rollergames playfield

Rollergames pinball machine

The game has three flippers, including an upper flipper halfway up the right side of the machine. The top right of the machine has three rollovers located above three pop bumpers; just below the lowest of these bumpers is a bank of three drop-targets, and to the left of the same bumper are three stand-up targets; three further stand-up targets are below the upper flipper, and a further bank of five S-K-A-T-E stand-up targets on the left of the playfield. At either side of the machine are orbits, called jetways. The main shot from the upper flipper is a ramp called "the wall", and labelled Wall of Death. A device called "the pit" located left of center uses a VUK to launch the ball along a habitrail to the upper flipper. A looping habitrail is combined with the ball-lock mechanism on the right of the machine to periodically launch locked balls around it. The three drop-targets are labelled W-A-R, representing the fictional "World Alliance of Rollersports."

The kickback mechanism from the left outlane uses a series of two kickbacks to fire the ball to the upper flipper.

== Gameplay ==
A magnet is located at the tip of the upper flipper and when activated the game tells the player "don't flip", followed by "flip" at the optimum time to hit "the wall" ramp; this shot is also used to lock balls for multiball. The jetway orbits are used to light the RollerGames teams. Completing the S-K-A-T-E targets lights a letter of WILLIAMS on the backglass.

== Reception ==
A Play Meter review awarded the game 3.5/5 stars, stating it is a fun game that plays well and providing a detailed overview of the gameplay. GameRoom also reviewed it favorably, and stated that the roller derby theme is likely to appeal to younger players.

In 1995, Steve Ritchie called this machine his biggest disappointment.

In 2015, a Rollergames machine was included in a roller derby exhibition at the Bullock Museum in Austin, Texas.
