= CART Fury Championship Racing =

2000 video game

- European PlayStation 2 cover art
- Developer: Midway
- Publisher: Midway
- Composer: Dan Forden
- Platforms: Arcade, PlayStation 2
- Release: Arcade; 2000; PlayStation 2: NA: May 25, 2001; EU: September 7, 2001
- Genre: Racing
- Modes: Single-player, multiplayer

CART Fury Championship Racing, also known as simply CART Fury, is a 2000 open wheel-themed racing video game developed by Midway Games based on Championship Auto Racing Teams (CART). Originally released to arcades, a version was also released for the PlayStation 2.

Some of its famous drivers like Juan Pablo Montoya, Michael Andretti, and Christian Fittipaldi, are included in the game. The game features the voice of Danny Sullivan. While the arcade version has original soundtrack composed by Dan Forden, the PlayStation 2 version has licensed music by Disturbed and Outkast as the official soundtrack.

== Gameplay ==
Rather than a being a true simulation, CART Fury Championship Racing is an arcade racer, with traits like spectacular crashes, spinouts, speed-draining slides, and tailgating. It includes road courses, street courses and oval tracks. Three skill levels (Easy, Medium, and Hard) allow players of all ability levels to compete on equal terms against the AI-controlled opponents.

== Reception ==
Reception

Aggregate score
Aggregator	Score
Metacritic	58/100

Review scores
Publication	Score
AllGame	3/5
Electronic Gaming Monthly	6.17/10
Game Informer	8/10
GamePro	3.5/5
GameRevolution	C−
GameSpot	5.7/10
GameSpy	55%
GameZone	8/10
IGN	5.5/10
Official U.S. PlayStation Magazine	1/5

The PlayStation 2 version received "mixed" reviews according to the review aggregation website Metacritic.
