= Eugene Jarvis =

American video game designer (born 1955)

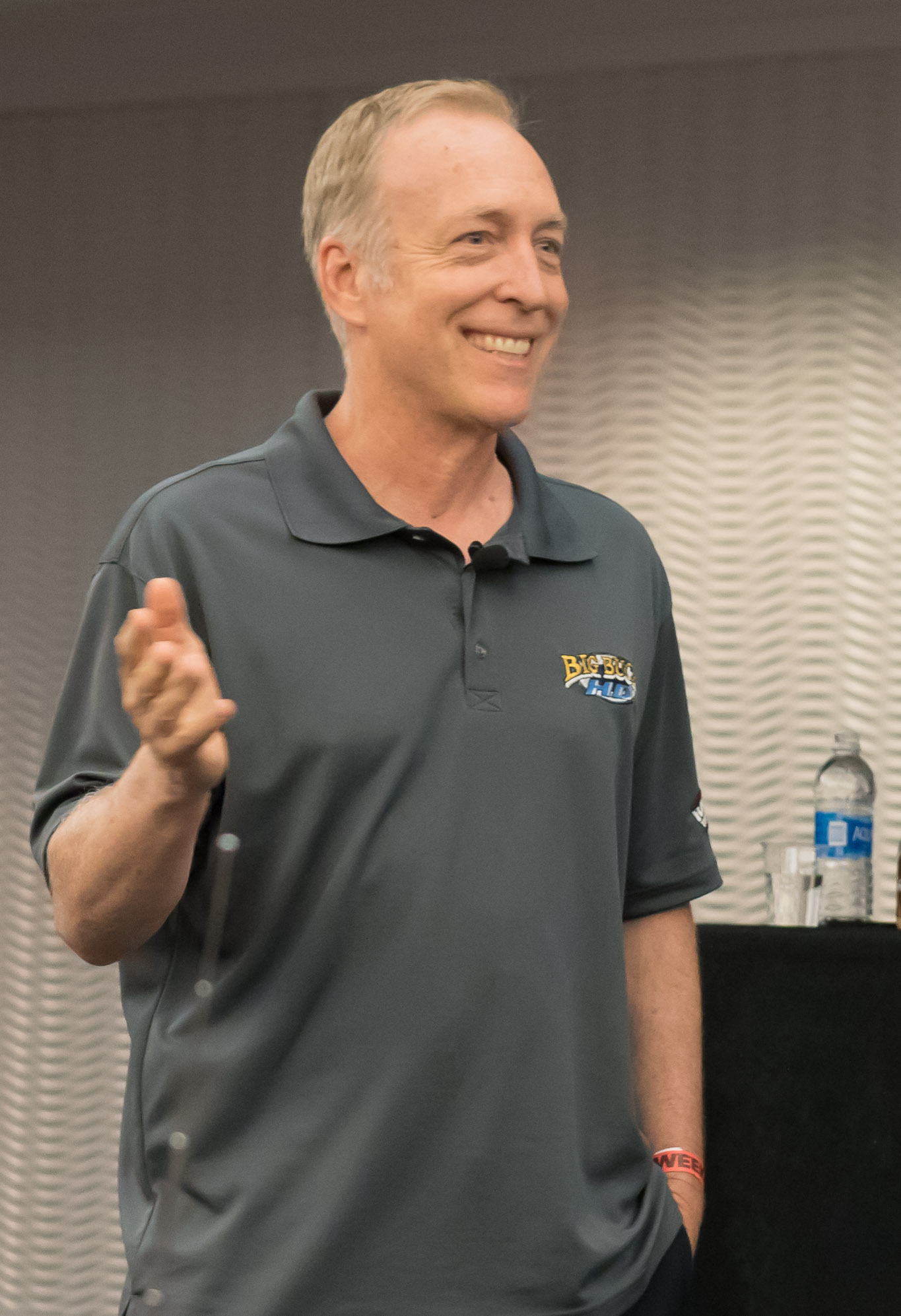
- Jarvis speaks during the Vid Kidz panel at California Extreme 2016.
- Born: January 27, 1955 (age 71); Palo Alto, California, U.S.
- Occupations: Video game and pinball programmer
- Known for: Firepower; Defender; Robotron: 2084; Cruis'n; Nex Machina

Eugene Peyton Jarvis is an American game designer and video game programmer, known for producing pinball machines for Williams Electronics and video games for Atari. Most notable among his works are the seminal arcade video games Defender and Robotron: 2084 in the early 1980s, and the Cruis'n series of racing games for Nintendo in the 1990s. He co-founded Vid Kidz in the early 1980s and currently leads his own development studio, Raw Thrills. In 2008, Eugene Jarvis was named the first Game Designer in Residence by DePaul University's Game Development program. His family owns the Jarvis Wines company in Napa, California.

In 2009, he was chosen by IGN as one of the top 100 game creators of all time.

== Early life and education ==
Jarvis was born in Palo Alto, California and grew up in Menlo Park. He has an older sister, Diane, and a younger sister, Helen. His first game was chess, which he played as a young child; he was one of the best players at Bellarmine College Preparatory in San Jose. Jarvis's first encounter with computers came while he was in high school attending a one-day course on FORTRAN programming given by IBM. Jarvis originally intended to become a biochemist but decided on studying computers instead. At the University of California, Berkeley, Jarvis did FORTRAN programming on mainframes. At Berkeley he got his first taste of computer gaming, playing Spacewar! in the basement of the physics lab. He received his B.S. in EECS in 1976 from Berkeley. In his last days before graduation, he interviewed with Atari, but did not receive a call back.

== Career ==
Having an interest in natural language processing, Jarvis was hired by Hewlett-Packard to help create a COBOL compiler. He disliked the boring HP culture and quit after only three days into the six-year project. A few days later, three months after his interview, Atari finally called him back, interested in hiring him. He joined them and started programming some of the first pinball games that used microprocessors. "I never quite understood why Atari got into the pinball business. They had this groundbreaking idea in video games, which at the time had far fewer parts and pieces, were far more reliable, and thus much less expensive to produce, yet they were putting time and money into pinball. It was kind of a mess," said Jarvis. Atari's pinball development branch failed a few years later, so he moved to Chicago to continue programming pinball games for Williams Electronics.

=== Video arcade games ===
The only legitimate use of a computer is to play games.

— Eugene Jarvis, Supercade

As Jarvis worked on pinball games at Williams in the late 1970s, Space Invaders was released, sparking great interest in microprocessor-based video games. Jarvis wanted to try making a video game. When thinking of design ideas with famed pinball designer Steve Ritchie, they developed the concept for Defender – a side-scroller with the player flying over the surface of a planet. Defender (1980) was Jarvis's first video game and turned out to be a huge hit, becoming one of the highest grossing video games from the golden age of arcade games. Williams expanded greatly with the success of Defender, but Jarvis left to found an independent game development firm called Vid Kidz with Larry DeMar in February 1981. After four months of tag-team programming between DeMar and Jarvis, they produced Vid Kidz's first game: Stargate (1981), an enhanced sequel to Defender that they sold to Williams.

Jarvis's next hit with Vid Kidz was the high-action game Robotron, which was produced by Williams in 1982. It took 6 months to develop. He then designed Blaster, a sort-of Robotron sequel set in 2085 — after the robots destroyed humanity — but with different, 3D gameplay. Though a marvel to look at, Blaster was not quite as successful or remembered as his previous video games. The video game crash of 1983 hit Williams hard, forcing them to cut back and revert to much of their pre-Defender business. Jarvis left Vid Kidz in 1984 to attend Stanford University, where he gained an MBA in 1986. He continued making games, designing Narc (1989) and helping develop Smash TV (1990), which drew comparisons to Robotron.

The next big leap for Jarvis was 3D. He had been interested in virtual reality since attending Berkeley in the 1970s. He and a group of others left Midway (which Williams had purchased in 1988) to experiment with VR, but disappointingly came to the realization that VR headsets were not catching on. They did find potential in multi-screen cockpit simulators though. He helped create 3D texture mapping hardware which ended up being used in his Cruis'n series of games.

Next Generation listed Jarvis in their "75 Most Important People in the Games Industry of 1995", both for the massive success of Defender and for Cruis'n USA, which they said is "arguably neck-and-neck with Daytona USA as the most popular driving game of 1994."

He works for his own studio, Raw Thrills Inc., and his more recent work has returned him to the coin-op arcade game world with Target: Terror, a first-person perspective shooting game based on the "war on terror", introduced in spring 2004. The second game from his studio, The Fast and the Furious debuted that fall along with the Target: Terror update kit. Since the release of Target Terror, the company has experienced strong growth, developing or releasing titles including Nicktoons Nitro, Guitar Hero Arcade, H2Overdrive, the Big Buck series of games and Jurassic Park Arcade among others.

In 2006, Raw Thrills purchased game developer Play Mechanix which is led by his friend George Petro. Together the two companies have developed arcade and video redemption games for ICE and Bandai Namco Amusements America.

In 2008, Jarvis was named DePaul University's first Game Designer in Residence. His involvement at DePaul's Game Development program includes lectures, supervision of game projects, and input on curriculum. He was recognized as the NY-AMOA Man of the Year in 2009 and he received the Academy of Interactive Arts & Sciences Pioneer Award in 2013.

Jarvis is the only video game designer to have his work featured on a U.S. postage stamp — two 1980's era children are depicted playing Defender on the video games stamp for the "Celebrate the Century" series. He also appeared in a cameo on the TV series NewsRadio (in the 3rd-season episode "Arcade") as "Delivery Man #3", a character who delivers a distracting arcade video game machine to the office. That arcade game is his own creation Stargate, which within the episode is called Stargate Defender and is described as being about "saving the humanoids" while avoiding the "Yllabian Space Guppies".

In 2018, Defender was included in the Chicago New Media 1973-1992 exhibition, that was curated by Jon Cates.

In 2022, Jarvis and his wife, Sasha Gerritson, gifted DePaul the university's largest ever gift, in support of the institution's College of Computing and Digital Media. In recognition of the couple's generosity and dedicated leadership, the college has been renamed the Eugene P. Jarvis College of Computing and Digital Media.

He was inducted into the Amusement Industry Hall of Fame in 2023.

== Games ==
=== Pinball ===
==== Atari ====
- The Atarians
- Time 2000
- Airborne Avenger
- Space Riders
- Superman

==== Williams ====
- Gorgar
- Laser Ball
- Firepower
- Space Shuttle
- High Speed
- F-14 Tomcat

=== Video games ===
- Defender
- Stargate
- Robotron: 2084
- Blaster
- NARC
- Smash TV
- Total Carnage
- Cruis'n series
- Target: Terror
- The Fast and the Furious
- The Fast and the Furious: Drift
- Nex Machina
