= Steve Ritchie (pinball designer) =

American pinball designer

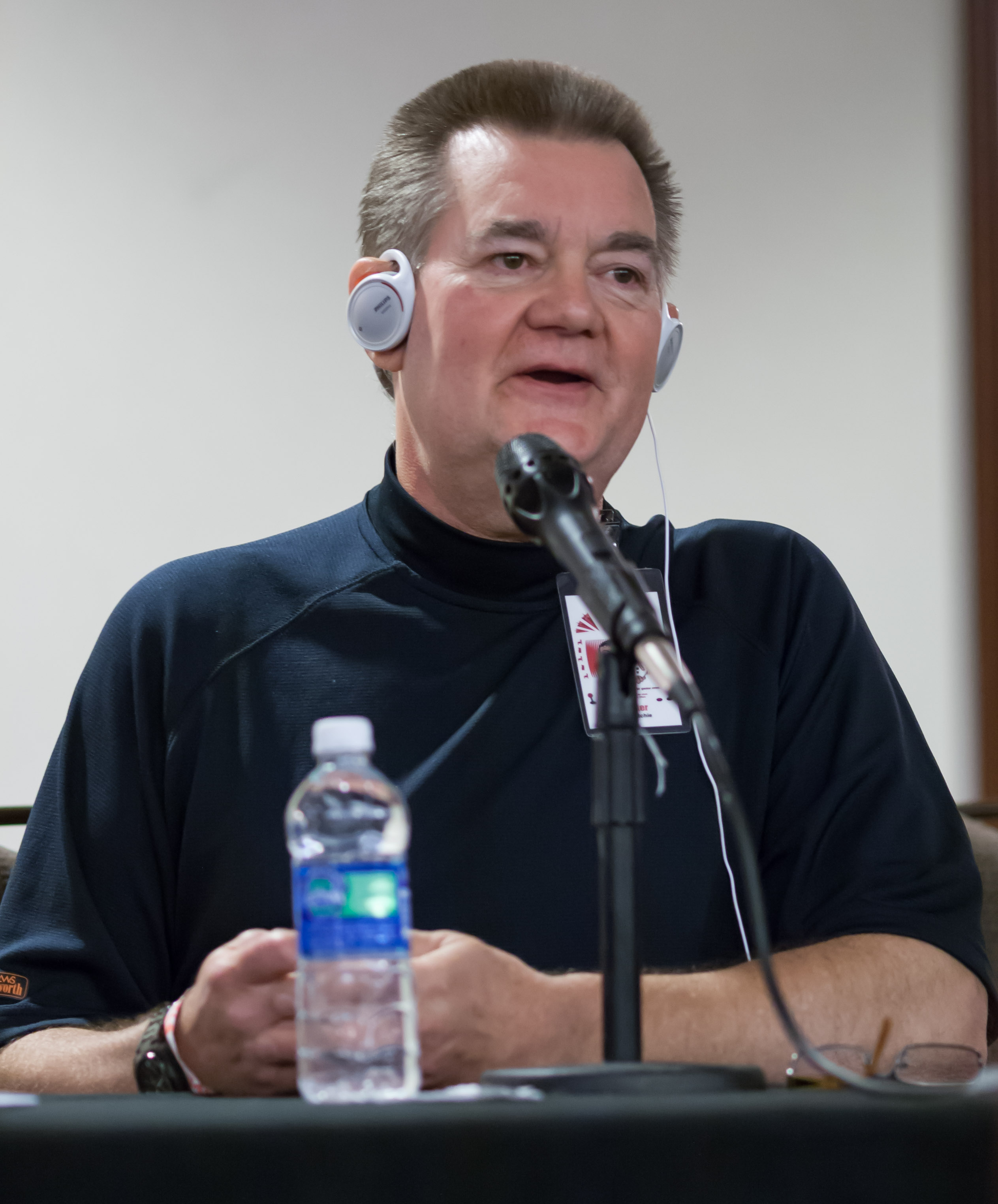
- Steve Ritchie speaks during the Atari panel at California Extreme 2009
- Born: Steven Scott Ritchie; February 13, 1950 (age 76); San Francisco, CA
- Occupations: Pinball designer, video game designer, voice actor
- Years active: 1974–2026
- Employer(s): Jersey Jack Pinball, Inc., Steve Ritchie Productions
- Known for: Black Knight, Black Knight 2000, Flash, Firepower, High Speed
- Relatives: Mark Ritchie (brother)
- Website: Steve Ritchie Productions (no longer active)

Steven Scott Ritchie (born February 13, 1950) is a retired American pinball and video game designer. His career began in the 1970s. Ritchie holds the record for best-selling pinball designer in history. He has been called "The Master of Flow" due to the emphasis in his designs on ball speed, loops, and long smooth shots. Ritchie was also the original voice of Shao Kahn in the Mortal Kombat fighting game series, serving as the announcer of Mortal Kombat II (1993), Mortal Kombat 3 (1995), and the updates to Mortal Kombat 3. He is the older brother of fellow pinball designer Mark Ritchie.

== Biography ==
Steve Ritchie was born in San Francisco, California and moved to Pacifica when he was five. He first played pinball at a local bowling alley that he visited during his parents' bowling league night. Ritchie graduated high school early and joined the Coast Guard shortly before his eighteenth birthday. He trained as an electronics technician, serving in Vietnam, California, and Alaska. After leaving the coast guard, he worked odd jobs and played in a band.

=== Early career ===
Ritchie joined Atari Inc. in 1974 and was employee number fifty and first worked on the assembly line as an electro-mechanical technician. Two years later, he was promoted to work at their fledgling pinball division, where he worked on his first game, Airborne Avenger, with Eugene Jarvis. Ritchie developed a pinball machine that eventually became the Superman pinball based on the Superman comic book; however, in the final stages of production of the table, Richie left to join Williams Electronics, a major pinball company.

=== Williams ===
In 1978 Ritchie moved to Chicago, Illinois, the home of Williams' headquarters. His first game for the company, Flash (released in 1979), was noted for its revolutionary figure-8 design and the first pinball game to feature bright Flash Lamps and an ascending background sound that increases in intensity the longer the play lasts. It would go on to be his best-selling pinball game, having sold over 19,000 units. In 1980 he designed Firepower (the first electronic pinball to feature multi-ball, as well as Lane Change), and eight months later, he designed Black Knight, which was noted for having the first two-level playfield and the patented "Magna-Save" feature (in which magnets help prevent outlane drains).

After 1981's Hyperball, Ritchie took a break from designing pinball games to design video games at his newly formed company, King Video Design. Devastator was the first 68000 microprocessor video game and it was a spectacular 3D flying-shooting game with remarkable graphics. Ritchie pioneered automated conversion of video-taped color images into objects in the video game system. After that, he returned to pinball with 1986's High Speed, which was based on a true story about him being chased by the police in his Porsche 928. Ritchie recounted how he drove at 146 miles per hour on I-5 in California before being pulled over by nine police cars in Lodi, California. The game featured the first music in a pinball machine, with Ritchie reflecting on the production, mentioning how he had a "sound guy" who took a year to translate the music but ultimately did not meet his taste, describing the resulting soundtrack as "hero music." High Speed's bill of materials was higher than other games, and some rival Williams designers nicknamed it "High Cost". The cost increase was minimal, and the game sold 17,080 units. It was the major title that revitalized the entire pinball market. After that, he released F-14 Tomcat in 1987, and in 1989, he released the sequel to 1980's Black Knight, Black Knight 2000, which was acclaimed for having perhaps one of the best musical soundtracks ever for a pinball game (composed by himself, Brian L. Schmidt, and Dan Forden). It was also one of the first games to feature a "Wizard Mode", called "The King's Ransom".

Next up was Rollergames (based on the TV show of the same name which was cancelled well before game production), it was a game with a loud and rowdy soundtrack and the first solid state game to feature mainstream advertising. Ritchie designed Terminator 2: Judgment Day, which featured the voice and likeness of Arnold Schwarzenegger. T2 was the first game by Williams to use a dot-matrix display (although Bally's Gilligan's Island beat it to the market, because T2 had a longer production schedule, and management at Williams felt that other games needed it first.) After T2, he designed The Getaway: High Speed II in 1992, a sequel to 1986's High Speed. In 1993, Ritchie released a widebody game, Star Trek: The Next Generation, which many pinball fans consider to be Ritchie's best game. For the game, Ritchie enlisted the entire cast of TNG, including Patrick Stewart, Michael Dorn, and Jonathan Frakes to reprise their roles. The game would sell 11,728 units. It was the last pinball machine to sell in the 5-digits. After he was finished with 1995's No Fear: Dangerous Sports, Ritchie left Williams, feeling that he could better serve Williams/Bally/Midway by producing video games at the newly acquired Atari Games. 1996 was the beginning of the decline of pinball with gradually diminishing sales, eventually leading to the extinction of all pinball manufacturers except Stern Pinball.

=== Video games and other contributions ===
Steve Ritchie returned to Atari Games in 1996 as a senior staff producer. There, he would design and produce the racing game California Speed, which sold 7,856 units for total sales of about $40 million, on a budget of $2 million, with a crew of 16 video programmers and artists. He also assisted the design team for Williams' Defender, convincing Eugene Jarvis the game should scroll in both directions.

He was a voice actor for many of his own games, as well as Williams and Midway's video games. He played the voice of Shao Kahn in the Mortal Kombat series (MKII, MK3, UMK3, MKT, MK:SM), and created the name of Mortal Kombat, which was just called 'Combat' before his suggestion. Ritchie was also the voice of the Black Knight in both Black Knight and Black Knight 2000, the Skull in No Fear, the announcer in Midway's High Impact Football, and the monotoned voice of Firepower.

=== Stern ===
After designing and selling a few redemption games, he formed Steve Ritchie Productions (SRP) in 2002, and returned to pinball design contracting with Stern Pinball to distribute his games. For his first game for Stern, Terminator 3: Rise of the Machines, he once again enlisted Arnold Schwarzenegger to lend his voice and likeness to the game, and also re-assembled the same team who worked with him on the T2 pinball, including software programmer Dwight Sullivan and music composer Chris Granner. After T3, Ritchie released Elvis, which was released in time for the 50th anniversary of Elvis Presley's first song recording. Ritchie's third game for Stern was World Poker Tour. World Poker Tour was the first game to use Stern's new hardware, S.A.M., which is the successor to their older Whitestar platform. In 2007 he revealed in an interview that he was forced by Gary Stern to design the game.

In 2009, after completing 24, a pinball machine based on the TV series of the same name, Ritchie was laid off from Stern along with most of the company's other pinball designers. A March 2011 press release from Stern reported that Steve had returned to Stern to design the next generation of pinball machines. His first game released after returning to Stern was AC/DC. Between 2011 and 2021, Ritchie designed Star Trek, Game of Thrones, Star Wars, Black Knight Sword of Rage and Led Zeppelin.

=== Jersey Jack ===
In August 2021, Ritchie left Stern Pinball and joined Jersey Jack Pinball.

He was the third pinball designer on staff, along with Pat Lawlor and Eric Meunier. In an April 2022 PinCast interview with Pinball Magazine and Pinball News, Ritchie said that he was actively working on a game for Jersey Jack and that it would likely be produced in the second half of 2022.

In 2023, Jersey Jack announced the release of their Elton John pinball machine, Ritchie's first design for the company. In 2026, JJP released Sonic the Hedgehog, Steve Ritchie's final game.

== Personal life ==
Circa 1995, he lost a ring finger fingertip from his left hand while riding dirt bikes.

As of 2017, Ritchie was diagnosed with Ménière's disease and has had his hearing slowly reduced over the years.

== Steve Ritchie's games ==
=== Atari ===
- Airborne Avenger (1977)
- Superman (1979)
- MeanStreak (video game) (1997) (unreleased)
- California Speed (video game) (1998)

=== Williams ===
- Flash (1979)
- Stellar Wars (1979)
- Firepower (1980)
- Black Knight (1980)
- Hyperball (1981) (hybrid game)
- High Speed (1986)
- F-14 Tomcat (1987)
- Black Knight 2000 (1989)
- Rollergames (1990)
- Terminator 2: Judgment Day (1991)
- The Getaway: High Speed II (1992)
- Star Trek: The Next Generation (1993; part of WMS' SuperPin series)
- No Fear: Dangerous Sports (1995)

=== Midway ===
- Elvira and the Party Monsters (1989; co-designed with Dennis Nordman and Jim Patla)
  - Ritchie did parts of the game, after original designer Dennis Nordman was severely injured in an off-road motorcycle accident.

=== Stern / Steve Ritchie Productions ===
- Terminator 3: Rise of the Machines (2003)
- Elvis (2004)
- World Poker Tour (2006)
- Spider-Man (2007)
- "24", based on 24 (2009)
- AC/DC (2012)
- Star Trek (2013)
- Game of Thrones (2015)
- Star Wars (2017)
- Black Knight: Sword of Rage (2019)
- Led Zeppelin (2020)

=== Jersey Jack Pinball ===
- Elton John (2023)
- Sonic the Hedgehog (2026)

== Voice work ==
- Firepower (pinball) (1980) - Mission Control
- Black Knight (pinball) (1980) - The Black Knight
- Space Shuttle (pinball) (1984) - Mission Control
- F-14 Tomcat (pinball) (1987) - Yagov
- Space Station (pinball) (1987) - Mission Control
- Big Guns (pinball) (1987) - King
- Taxi (pinball) (1988) - Gorbie
- Black Knight 2000 (1989) - The Black Knight
- Police Force (pinball) (1989)
- Rollergames (pinball) (1990) - Announcer
- Diner (pinball) (1990) - Boris
- Mortal Kombat II (1993) - Shao Kahn/announcer
- Star Trek: The Next Generation (pinball) (1993) - Admiral Biaggi
- Revolution X (1994) - Vocalisations
- Mortal Kombat 3 (1995) - Shao Kahn/announcer
- Ultimate Mortal Kombat 3 (1995) - Shao Kahn/announcer
- No Fear: Dangerous Sports (1995) - Skull
- Mortal Kombat Trilogy (1996) - Shao Kahn/announcer
- Terminator 3: Rise of the Machines (pinball) (2003) - weapons salesman
- Mortal Kombat: Shaolin Monks (2005) - Shao Kahn, additional voices
- AC/DC (pinball) (2012) - Announcer
- Black Knight: Sword of Rage (2019) - The Black Knight
