= Dan Forden =

American sound programmer

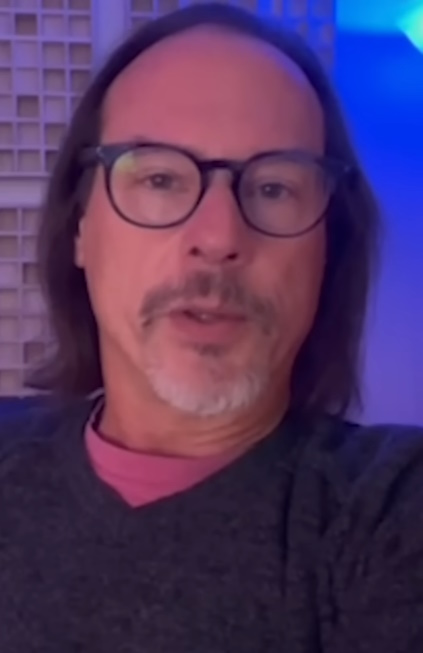
- Forden in 2023
- Born: Daniel Warner Forden; September 28, 1963 (age 62); Chicago, Illinois, U.S.
- Other name: Toasty
- Occupations: Musician, sound programmer
- Years active: 1985−2025
- Spouse: Ann Mazza (m. 1994)
- Children: 2

Daniel Warner Forden (born September 28, 1963) is an American sound programmer and music composer. He has worked on video games developed by Midway and its successor NetherRealm Studios since 1989. Forden achieved recognition for his audio work on the Mortal Kombat fighting game series where he was part of the original design team. He is also recognized for his Easter egg appearances in the series. Outside of video games, Forden played bass guitar in the progressive rock band Cheer-Accident from 1992 to 1993.

== Biography and working style ==
Forden is the youngest of their four children to Sara Forden (née Mazza) and Michael Forden.

Forden is a graduate of the Oberlin Conservatory of Music in the TIMARA program (or Technology in Music and Related Arts). He graduated in 1985 from the Conservatory and has since produced sounds for many Williams Electronics games. Forden's musical style, particularly for the Mortal Kombat series, is often a mixture of synthetic and organic sounds. A typical composition usually incorporates ethnic drumming with synthetic basses, synthetic leads and/or pads, and sometimes exotic instruments.

In the Mortal Kombat series, he is credited as Dan "Toasty" Forden. The nickname derives from an Easter egg that first appeared in Mortal Kombat II, where Forden's head would appear in the bottom-right corner of the screen and shout "Toasty!" in a falsetto when an uppercut was performed. In Mortal Kombat 4, Forden sometimes exclaims "Toasty! 3D!". The easter egg also appears in the "Tournament" stage of Mortal Kombat 11, using the Mortal Kombat 3 graphic of Forden. The "Toasty!" sound effect would be featured frequently in the series after its introduction, often in reference to fatalities performed by Scorpion.

Two additional Easter eggs were created featuring Forden in Mortal Kombat 3 and Ultimate Mortal Kombat 3; freezing an opponent in "danger mode" with Sub-Zero would make him shout "Frosty!" and both players holding down the "High Punch" button after a Stage Fatality in Scorpion's Lair would make him shout "Crispy!!"

Forden also included the "toasty" quote in the pinball machine Medieval Madness. When the player hits the right ramp, one of the quotes that is played is "toasty!".

The "Toasty!" Easter egg is attributed in the dance simulator StepMania: whenever a player gets 250 consecutive Perfects or better (Excellents or better in the 4.0 CVS version), a "toasty" appears. The PopCap game Peggle also features a tribute, as does the Aerosmith-themed rail shooter Revolution X, where singer Steven Tyler shouts "Toasty!" in reaction to explosions.

Several songs that he composed for the Mortal Kombat 3 soundtrack were used in the precursor to South Park, Jesus vs. Santa.

Forden retired on October 1, 2025, announcing his departure from NetherRealm Studios on Instagram the following day.

== Works ==
=== Pinball ===
==== Williams ====
- Black Knight 2000 (with Brian L. Schmidt and Steve Ritchie)
- Bad Cats
- Rollergames
- Riverboat Gambler (with Paul Heitsch)
- The Machine: Bride of Pin*Bot (with Jon Hey and Rich Karstens)
- The Getaway: High Speed II
- Star Trek: The Next Generation
- No Fear: Dangerous Sports
- Medieval Madness

==== Midway (Bally) ====
- Atlantis (with Robin Seaver)
- Mousin' Around!
- Harley Davidson
- The Party Zone
- The Pinball Circus
- The Shadow
- Attack From Mars
- Safecracker
- Revenge From Mars

==== Stern ====
- The Simpsons Pinball Party (with Chris Granner)

=== Video games ===
Year	Game	Role(s)			System(s)	Notes
Year	Game	Audio director	Sound and/or Music	Other	System(s)	Notes
1989	Arch Rivals	No	Yes	No	Arcade	
1991	Super High Impact	No	Yes	No	Arcade	
1992	Mortal Kombat	No	Yes	No	Arcade	
1993	Mortal Kombat II	No	Yes	No	Arcade	
1995	Mortal Kombat 3	No	Yes	No	Arcade	
1995	Ultimate Mortal Kombat 3	No	Yes	Yes	Arcade	Grunts, Screams, Groans and Gibberish
1996	Mortal Kombat Trilogy	No	Yes	Yes	PlayStation	Graphics
1997	Mortal Kombat Mythologies: Sub-Zero	No	Yes	No	PlayStation	
1997	Mortal Kombat 4	No	Yes	No	Arcade	Only credited in MK4 Design Team
2000	Mortal Kombat: Special Forces	No	Yes	No	PlayStation	
2000	CART Fury	No	Yes	No	Arcade	
2002	WWF Raw	No	Yes	No	Xbox	Sound effects recording
2002	NFL Blitz 20-02	No	Yes	No	GameCube; PlayStation 2 Xbox	Sound effects only
2002	Mortal Kombat: Deadly Alliance	No	Yes	No	GameCube; PlayStation 2 Xbox	
2002	MLB SlugFest 20-03	No	Yes	No	GameCube; PlayStation 2 Xbox	Sound effects only
2003	MLB SlugFest 20-04	No	Yes	No	GameCube; PlayStation 2	Sound effects only
2004	Psi-Ops: The Mindgate Conspiracy	No	Yes	No	PlayStation 2 Xbox	Additional audio
2004	NBA Ballers	No	No	Yes	PlayStation 2	Commentary design
2004	Mortal Kombat: Deception	Yes	Yes	No	PlayStation 2 Xbox	
2004	MLG Slugfest Loaded	Yes	No	No	PlayStation 2 Xbox	
2005	Unreal Championship 2: The Liandri Conflict	No	No	Yes	Xbox	Voice Production
2005	Mortal Kombat: Shaolin Monks	Yes	No	No	PlayStation 2 Xbox	
2005	Blitz: The League	No	No	Yes	PlayStation 2 Xbox	Additional audio support
2005	NBA Ballers: Phenom	Yes	No	No	PlayStation 2 Xbox	
2006	Mortal Kombat: Armageddon	Yes	No	No	PlayStation 2 Xbox	
2006	MLB Slugfest 2006	No	No	Yes	PlayStation 2 Xbox	
2011	Mortal Kombat	No	Yes	Yes	PlayStation 3 Xbox 360	Lead sound designer
2011	Batman: Arkham City Lockdown	No	No	Yes	iOS; Android	Senior sound designer
2013	Injustice: Gods Among Us	Yes	Yes	No	PlayStation 3 Wii U Xbox 360	3 tracks in album
2015	WWE Immortals	No	Yes	No	iOS; Android	
2015	Mortal Kombat X	Yes	No	No	iOS; Android; PlayStation 4 Xbox One	
2017	Injustice 2	Yes	Yes	No	iOS; Android; PlayStation 4 Xbox One	3 tracks in album
2019	Mortal Kombat 11	Yes	Yes	No	PlayStation 4 Xbox One; Nintendo Switch; Microsoft Windows	Music for the stage "Sea of Blood"
