= The Getaway: High Speed II =

1992 pinball machine

- Manufacturer: Williams
- Release date: February 1992
- System: Williams WPC (Fliptronics II)
- Model #: 50004
- Players: 4
- Design: Steve Ritchie
- Programming: Dwight Sullivan
- Artwork: Mark Sprenger; Doug Watson
- Mechanics: Carl Biagi
- Music: Dan Forden
- Sound: Dan Forden
- Voices: Steve Ritchie; Larry DeMar
- Production run: 13,259

The Getaway: High Speed II is a pinball game designed by Steve Ritchie and released by Williams in 1992. It is a sequel to 1986's High Speed.

== Design ==
The Getaway is almost identical to its predecessor, with the following changes:

- Dot-matrix display (resolution: 128x32)
- The plunger is replaced with a gearshift, which is also used during main gameplay, as well as the video mode
- A small elevated loop, fed by the left ramp and fitted with a magnetic ball accelerator called the Supercharger. Steve Ritchie said the ball "seemed like a speeding car" when released onto the playfield. This device was patent-protected.
- Some of the targets in the upper playfield were moved slightly to make room for the new ramp

This game uses "La Grange" by ZZ Top for its main gameplay song.

The sound played when a ball is launched is a recording of a 1969 Chrysler with a 426 Hemi V-8 engine recorded on California Avenue, Chicago.

A technical improvement in this game is the end-of-stroke switch for the flippers which help prevent coil damage. This is the first game under the Williams brand to incorporate it, but was first used in Bally's The Addams Family.

Doug Watson created the backglass with the car racing towards the player rather than away as in the original High Speed. As well as two police cars chasing the car, two military Apache helicopters are shown.

== Gameplay ==
There are two main objectives in the game:

- Run the Red Light — Lock the three balls by first hitting all three stoplight targets of the same colour (first green, then yellow and finally red) and then shooting the left loop or the small inner loop to lock the ball. After the final lock, Multiball will start. (Super) Jackpots can then be lit by shooting into the Supercharger and scored by shooting the left loop or the small inner loop.
- Redline Mania — Repeated shots to the outer loops increase the RPM reading on the tachometer display in the center of the playfield. When the reading reaches an indicated threshold, the player can collect an award by using the gearshift lever. The sequence is as follows:
  - 1st Gear - 3 Million
  - 2nd Gear - Hold Bonus
  - 3rd Gear - Light Video Mode
  - 4th Gear - Supercharger Mode
  - 5th Gear - Light Redline Mania

The last of these is collected by shooting the Supercharger.

Redline Mania is a normal Multiball, except that no loops are required to light the initial Jackpot, all targets are worth 500K, and the Super Jackpot begins at 100M (with no corresponding increase in the number of loops required to light it). It is generally best to collect Redline Mania after lighting the Extra Ball on the Freeway, because it cannot be lit after collecting Redline Mania. Because the Super Jackpot is so much more valuable in Redline Mania, it is very important to get the regular Jackpot out of the way, preferably on one of the two free shots earned (either from the Hideout or the auto-plunger, depending on whether or not any balls were actually locked), and then shoot for lighting and collecting the 100M Super Jackpot as if it were the regular Jackpot.

If the player has previously collected a 100M Super Jackpot or higher, the starting value for the Super Jackpot in Redline Mania will be 25M more than the highest collected Super Jackpot value.

Secondary objectives:

- Freeway — Either inlane will light the corresponding outer loop for a Freeway reward. The fifth Freeway will light Extra Ball in the Tunnel (if 5 extra balls have been earned during game, a score award is given thereafter).
- Tunnel — The Tunnel is used for various purpose:
  - Collect "Burn Rubber" (lit by shifting into a higher gear)
  - Collect Extra Ball (score award is given if 5 extra balls are won during game)
  - Collect Video Mode (driving game)
  - Collect Helicopter Bonus (only after scoring a Jackpot during Multiball)
  - Increase Tunnel Shots (results in a special)
- 1-2-3 targets — Relight Kickback and/or Supercharger Loop
- Supercharger — Depending on the number of 1-2-3 targets scored, collect up to 10 million
- Speed Millions — Continuous shots to the inner loop by the upper right flipper will score increasing (unlimited) Speed Millions

A hidden mode, secret mania, can be played by shifting the gears when at least three police cars are shown in front of Donut heaven.

=== Video Mode ===
In video mode, the player steers the car through three lanes filled with slow-moving cars (while the police are yelling at them to pull over). The player begins in 3rd Gear, and can shift from 1st to 5th, though 5th is generally recommended. The player continues until they crash or pass a certain number of cars. The video mode is lit when completing 3rd Gear, and remains lit until collected.

== Reception ==
The game had high demand in the United States, Canada, and Europe and the production line was expanded to cope with this demand. Reliability was also noted, with 85% of its High Speed predecessor still in operation 6 years after release.

Nintendo Power found the Game Boy version to have interesting fast action, but no saved high scores. GamePro's brief review of this version stated, "At first this pinball game is innovative and fun. In the pinball section you can tilt the board, and when you hit special ramps you're put into a racing game. But the repetitive music and static graphics don't add much, and the gameplay quickly gets boring."

== Digital versions ==
A version of this table was released for the Game Boy in 1995.

This table was released for The Pinball Arcade by FarSight Studios in August 2015, but was later removed on June 30, 2018 due to licensing issues.

It was subsequently released as part of Williams volume 1 for Pinball FX3 on October 9, 2018; with a remastered version released for Pinball FX on March 31, 2022.
