= Black Knight 2000 =

1989 pinball machine

- Manufacturer: Williams
- Release date: April 1989
- System: Williams System 11B
- Design: Steve Ritchie
- Programming: Ed Boon
- Artwork: Doug Watson
- Mechanics: Joe Joos Jr.
- Music: Brian Schmidt; Dan Forden; Steve Ritchie
- Sound: Brian Schmidt; Dan Forden
- Voices: Steve Ritchie (Black Knight); Stephanie Rogers (choir); Glo Van Vlack (choir)
- Production run: 5,703

Black Knight 2000 is a 1989 pinball game designed by Steve Ritchie (who also provides the Knight's voice) and released by Williams Electronics. The game is the sequel to the 1980 pinball machine Black Knight. It was advertised with the slogan "He rides again." and features a black knight theme. 30 years later, Ritchie would design a third game in the series for Stern Pinball, titled Black Knight: Sword of Rage.

== Design ==
Black Knight 2000 was originally designed as a sequel to Ritchie's hit 1979 pinball game, Flash.

=== Audio ===
Brian Schmidt was lead composer and audio director for this game. Black Knight 2000 was the first pinball machine that Dan Forden worked on, and his first task was to come up with lead guitar and other sounds. Steve Ritchie came up with a riff, and Forden extended it for the multiball music. The designers 1972 Les Paul Custom was sampled for playing throughout the game. If the sound levels of several machines are set at the same level, the vocal chorus cuts through the sound of the rest of the arcade. One of the design choices for the game is that music plays continuously throughout a game. To achieve this a song-matrix system was used to allow seamless transition from one song to another. The pitch of the sound effects changed to fit the song playing. Many of the lights on the machine are triggered by musical cues. A few actions in the game have a short pause to synchronize with the music. The sound is played using a 6809 processor controlling a Yamaha YM2151 chip; this then controlled a CVSD HC-55536 analog compression chip to generate the singing which was thought to be impossible until Ed Boon successfully programmed it.

Schmidt and Forden weren't satisfied with the three-to-four female Williams employees they hired to sing the vocals, and they eventually brought in two local singers, Stephanie Rogers and her friend, Glo Van Vlack, to play the Choir of Angels.

A full orchestral version was arranged, and recorded in 2021 by the Washington Metropolitan gamer symphony orchestra.

In a guide to the game, Pinball Player recommended turning the sound up to derive the full benefit of the game.

=== Artwork ===
The artwork on the playfield uses lightning bolts to highlight shots, some of which are obscured by the upper playfield. The mirrored backglass shows the Black knight on a horse clutching a lightning bolt, surrounded by a ring of lightning bolts echoing the ring on the main (lower) playfield. The design of the backglass was influenced by Kevin O'Connor's Flash Gordon.

== Game pricing ==
After performing well in testing, it was suggested for operators in the United States that 50¢ per 5 or 3 ball game should initially be used, higher than the typical 25¢ per 3 ball game on other pinball machines at the time; factory settings set the pricing at 50¢ for a 5 ball game. Williams had also discovered that the game earned more if the volume was loud.

== Layout ==
=== Lower playfield ===
The table has a kickback in the left outlane, with a magna-save above the right inlane; the magna-save is controlled by a button on the right side of the cabinet. There is a U-turn mini-loop in the middle of the playfield. On the left of the machine are three stand-up targets spelling K-N-I, between the entrances to the loop are three further stand-up target spelling G-H-T. On the left of the machine is the skyway ramp which leads to the upper playfield; on the right side of the loop is a lane which lead to a vertical up-kicker (VUK) which transfers the ball to the same part of the upper playfield. Towards the right side of the machine is a short lane with a kick-out hole.

=== Upper playfield ===
Covering part of the lower playfield including the mini loop is a large upper playfield. At the top of this are three rollovers which spell W-I-N, located above three pop bumpers. There is a single flipper and a looping lane which can return the ball to this flipper. On the left side is a bank of three targets similar to those used on Pin-Bot which can raise to reveal the skyway ramp leading to the ball lock mechanism. The VUK from the lower playfield deposits the ball just below the group of three pop bumpers. The ball can only leave the upper playfield on a wireform which deposits it back on the lower playfield near the right flipper; there are three rollovers, W-A-R, and one gap with no rollover leading to this wireform.

For ease of service, the upper playfield swings upwards.

== Gameplay ==
At the start of a game the ball is launched onto the upper playfield. The game is controlled by two flippers on the lower playfield, and a single flipper on the right of the upper playfield. The game has a two-ball multiball called the "double-knight's challenge" which is started at the kick-out hole when it is briefly lit; the objective is then to spell WAR on the upper playfield. The main multiball is a three-ball multiball, started by locking three balls behind the drawbridge (lowered by hitting the three targets on it) and up the drawbridge ramp. Hitting the drawbridge ramp again when lit can score jackpots, and spot letters in the word RANSOM.

The most challenging feature of the game is to spell RANSOM. The letters are retained between games, and once started this feature gives players a timed ball save, with everything on the playfield lit.

The lightning wheel in the center of the playfield controls sixteen bonus awards; one of these is an extra ball which is awarded to players having a low scoring game. Other features includes the WIN rollovers which advance the bonus multiplier, and the KNIGHT targets which are lit for a limited time, and advance a letter in BLACK when completed. If BLACK is completed the player can score further points by hitting the skyway ramp.

The game records the player with the highest number of consecutive loops on the upper playfield as the "loop champion"; this loop also awards points and can light extra balls.

== Digital versions ==
The table was included in the arcade game cabinet UltraPin in 2006.

Black Knight 2000 was released for the third season of The Pinball Arcade in 2014, and it was available until June 30, 2018, when all Williams tables were removed due to licensing issues.

It was released alongside Banzai Run and Earthshaker! for Pinball FX on December 12, 2024.

== Playtime toys ==
Playtime Products licensed Black Knight 2000, and used the name and artwork to create a small battery operated toy version and a simple handheld electronic game; neither bear any resemblance to the original playfield.
