= Riverboat Gambler =

1990 pinball machine

'Riverboat Gambler'
- Riverboat Gambler flyer
- Manufacturer: Williams
- Release date: 1990
- Model #: 50007
- Design: Ward Pemberton
- Programming: Dwight Sullivan
- Artwork: Linda Deal (aka Doane), Pat McMahon
- Mechanics: Greg Tastad
- Music: Paul Heitsch, Dan Forden, Mark Ritchie
- Sound: Paul Heitsch
- Voices: Mark Ritchie
- Production run: 3,200 units (approximate)

Riverboat Gambler is a gambling-themed pinball machine produced by Williams. Pinball machine designer Mark Ritchie reportedly sings the song that plays during the game, whose gravel-voiced, New Orleans-style male voice sounds similar to Louis Armstrong.

== Description ==
In the center of the head of the machine, a vertical roulette wheel operates more like the Wheel of Fortune than an actual roulette wheel and does not have a ball. 7 of the 16 sections are black, and 7 are red, which alternate, with two green spaces that have stars on opposite sides. Located directly above the roulette wheel, a four-digit display keeps track of virtual chips. The player uses chips earned on the playfield to bet on the roulette wheel.

There is an easter egg in the game. With the game on and a ball at the plunger, press and hold the Red and Black buttons, then press PASS 3 times, Black 3 times, Red 3 times, and Green 3 times. The display will shimmer, then press Black and Red together. The display will display "HELLO WORLD".

== Gameplay ==
The player spells C-A-S-I-N-O by performing a variety of tasks.

== Reception ==
In an article for The Flipside the editor found the game to be attractive and made creative use of its displays. The strategy elements of the game were appreciated although realized others would dislike them, and that the game is unsuitable for use in tournaments.
