= Bad Cats =

1989 pinball machine

- Manufacturer: Williams
- Release date: November 1989
- System: Williams System 11B
- Design: Barry Oursler
- Programming: Ed Suchocki
- Artwork: Python Anghelo
- Mechanics: Joe Joos, Jr.
- Music: Dan Forden
- Sound: Dan Forden
- Production run: 2,500

Bad Cats is a pinball machine released in November 1989 by Williams. It was designed by Barry Oursler and Python Anghelo.

== Design ==
In 1989, Python Anghelo moved to an area near the Williams factory. A neighbour on one side had two dogs, while his neighbour on the other side had numerous feral cats; the animals meeting in his yard inspired the theme for the machine.

When the centre ramp is hit, a musical "Meow, meow-meow-meow!” is played.

The style of some of the music was inspired by the Alice Cooper song "Gutter Cat vs. the Jets".

Unusually, the game doesn't include multiball.

=== Backglass Art ===
Python Anghelo's face is on the snake on the backglass, labelled "Pinball Python". The backglass includes the quote “There are crazy cats and there are copy cats!”

The housewife on the backglass is based on Anghelo's ex-wife. This mechanism hits a cat, making it spin, based on a similar mechanism to the 1965 pinball machine Buckaroo. The right side of the backglass has a column showing the jackpot value.

After his death, Anghelo's personal machine was found, containing a card naming most of the characters in the game.

== Gameplay ==
The game is themed around a group of cats and various ways they cause mischief. The object of the game is to spell out "BAD CATS" and accumulate the progressive jackpot that begins at 1 million points.

=== Skill Shot ===
The ball is shot into the upper rollovers. One is selected at random, and will be flashing. If the ball goes through the flashing lane, the game will award the player BONUS 2X + 120,000 points + lighting the barbecue light. The lane-change feature doesn't change the roll-over that is flashing.

=== Barbecue ===
The barbecue, when lit, causes the point value of the jet bumpers to go up from 500 points each to 5,000 points each, accompanied by cat meows and the occasional dog bark for each hit. If the player does not light the barbecue via the Skill Shot, they can light it by completing a drop-target bank.

=== Inlanes ===
The left inlane, when lit, lights the Doghouse scoop. The right inlane, when lit, lights the 10X Fish Bone-Us. One lane is always lit; when collected, the light moves to the other lane. The lit lane can also be moved by the slingshots, the left/right rubber-switches, and sometimes, the jet bumpers.

=== Fishbowl Ramp ===
The S-E-A-F-O-O-D feature is collected from a lit Doghouse. The Doghouse is lit by passing through a lit left inlane, or by shooting the unlit Doghouse. It is lit for 20 seconds. Shooting a lit Doghouse spins the S-E-A-F-O-O-D wheel, which will award one of a series of prizes.

The wheel is also spun if the player manages to collect "Curiosity Spin;" this is done when the ball drains over an outlane when it is lit.

=== Curiosity Spin ===
The "Curiosity Spin" lamps are lit at both outlanes (simultaneously) on the last ball. If the ball drains via one of the outlanes, the player gets a Curiosity Spin, which spins the S-E-A-F-O-O-D wheel. If the player wins an extra ball on the Curiosity Spin, however, the lamps are not lit on the extra ball.

=== Trash Can/Fish-Bone Us ===
The trash can is linked to the linear "fish" target. If the fish target is not hit, the trash can is deemed "empty," and awards 10,000 points when it is hit. Hitting the Fish target will light the fish for 25K, 50K, 75K, 100K or 500K. These are timed, and will slowly turn off, one at a time, until only the 25K lamp remains.

=== Tiger Ramp ===
The Tiger Ramp is the large ramp on the far left side of the table. Shooting the ball up the ramp awards 50K, 100K, 200K, and then 1 million points for every ramp shot. Consecutive shots have to be made to score these values (although the ramp is not timed, for unknown reasons); hitting a birdie target or other target resets the values.

On the last ball only, making enough consecutive shots without missing also awards 20 million points (which can only be won once; afterwards, it resets to 1 million points for every ramp shot).

=== Fishbowl Ramp ===
The fishbowl ramp is the middle ramp. When lit, it awards 30K, 50K, 100K, and an extra ball; shots must be made consecutively to score all values, including the extra ball. The extra ball can only be collected once from the fishbowl ramp, and completing drop targets can light the extra ball.

On the last ball only, making a fifth consecutive shot after scoring 1 million points awards a special bonus of 20 million points. This bonus can only be collected once.

=== Jackpot ===
The jackpot is a progressive jackpot that begins at 1 million points and increases until it is collected. Although the backglass displays the progressive jackpot at up to 8 million points, the game's maximum jackpot is usually 20 million depending on factory settings.

The jackpot is lit, after the player shoot the drop target to spell B-A-D-C-A-T-S, and awarded with a shot to the middle ramp.

=== Bonus Multiplier ===
Completing the rollovers at the top of the table to spell T-O-Y advances the bonus multiplier up to 7X. The bonus itself never exceeds 999,000 points.

== Reception ==
Pinball Player said that while fun for an odd game, that there is no real depth to the gameplay.

=== Self-Criticism ===
Python Anghelo said that he hated working on this game. "Bad Cats was a joke. Bad Cats, and Bugs Bunny's Birthday Ball, are one of my 'yes boy, kiss-ass'... and they're one of my worst experiences."
