= High Speed (pinball) =

1986 pinball machine

- Manufacturer: Williams
- Release date: January 1986
- System: Williams System 11
- Model #: 541
- Players: 1-4
- Design: Steve Ritchie
- Programming: Larry DeMar
- Artwork: Mark Sprenger, Python Anghelo
- Music: Bill Parod, Steve Ritchie
- Sound: Bill Parod, Eugene Jarvis
- Voices: Steve Ritchie, Larry DeMar
- Production run: 17,080

High Speed is a pinball game designed by Steve Ritchie and released by Williams Electronics in 1986. It is based on Ritchie's real-life police chase inside a 1979 Porsche 928. He was caught in Lodi, California on Interstate 5 and accused of speeding at 146 miles per hour (235 km/h).

It was the first Williams game to feature a jackpot to be collected within the multiball.

A sequel was released in 1992 called The Getaway: High Speed II.

== Design ==
The machine went through several iterations of design.

This is the first Williams pinball machine to use an alpha-numeric display; but due to the high cost of these displays they were only used for the top two displays, with the two lower displays numeric-only displays. An alphanumeric display had previously been used in Hyperball, a 1981 Williams arcade machine. Python Anghelo designed the backglass so the score display is in the dashboard of the radar unit in the police car. The police are shown chasing a red Lamborghini Countach with a blonde woman as a passenger; this car has the license plate KINGPIN, a nickname of Steve Ritchie. The speed 146mph is used in the backglass artwork.

The game was originally designed without background music, but after Gottlieb Premier released Rock the decision was made to add it.

The playfield artwork was designed by Mark Sprenger and the numbers on the police cars - A8, W11, S81 - spell the initials of his son and birthdate in a similar way to on Space Shuttle.

The game is the first to use auto-percentaging, where the score required to win a free game is adjusted higher or lower based on the scores obtained by players.

During early testing on location, the beacon was made to flash when a coin was inserted.

== Gameplay ==
The main object of the game is to turn the main stoplight (located on the ramp) from green to yellow to red by hitting the nine stoplight targets (three of each color). Shooting the ball up the ramp or into the eject hole (saucer) also spots a stoplight target. Once all nine have been lit, the objective is to shoot the ball up the ramp again, thus "running the red light," and starting the police chase mode.

To escape the police, the player can either shoot the ball up the ramp again (a Getaway) or by lighting all nine stoplight targets again and then shooting the eject hole (an Escape), starting multi-ball. Once multi-ball begins, all targets, spinners, and bumper shots increase the Hideout Jackpot (which carries over from game to game until won, and begins at 250,000 points, growing to a maximum of 2 million points). To win the jackpot, the player must shoot the ramp once again.

Another main feature of the game is the Freeways; one is located in each of the left and right orbits, denoted by spinners (and a third spinner leads to the eject hole). Shooting either one of the two inlanes or making a loop around one of the orbits lights a Freeway, and the player then has 5 seconds to shoot the lit orbit again, scoring the Freeway value, increasing from 25,000 to 100,000 points, and eventually lighting an extra ball (which can be collected by shooting the eject hole).

Shooting the ball up the ramp also increases the bonus multiplier from 2X up to 5X, any additional shots beyond 5X activate the BONUS HELD.

Once the jackpot has been won, the player can then attempt to light all nine stoplight targets again (as long as multi-ball is still going), and doing so lights a special, which can be collected if the ball drains in the correct outlane.

This game is the first to use "automatic replay percentaging", a system where the score for a free credit or extra ball is adjusted for the skill of the players who have recently played it.

The game was designed so players would run the red light in about 50% of games.

== Production ==
During its design, High Speed was jokingly called "High Cost" by some rival Williams engineers due to its then-high production cost. The advances in the mechanical design that went into High Speed, coupled with the machine's popularity, led to many machines being kept in service much longer than was previously the norm. The play surfaces of the machine were not initially given as much attention, leading to many High Speed machines seeing service to this day in extremely worn condition. Williams rapidly addressed this issue by making mylar playfield covers available and later adding hard clear paint coats to their playfields. Canadian specialist Classic Playfield Reproductions produced an officially licensed High Speed 13-color Reproduction Playfield, which shipped as limited edition in 2014.

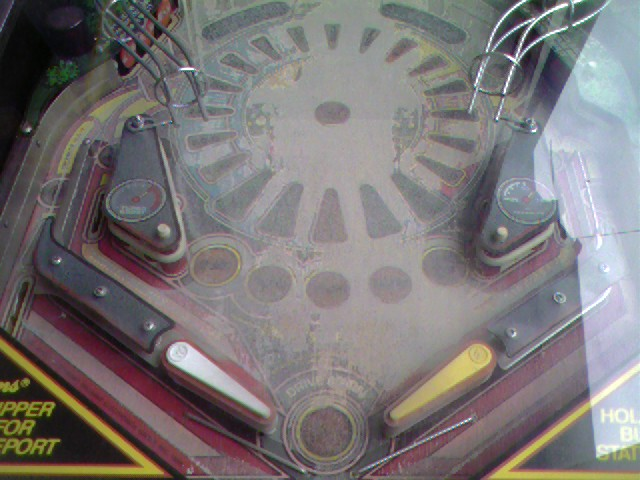
An extremely worn machine currently (2008) still in service.

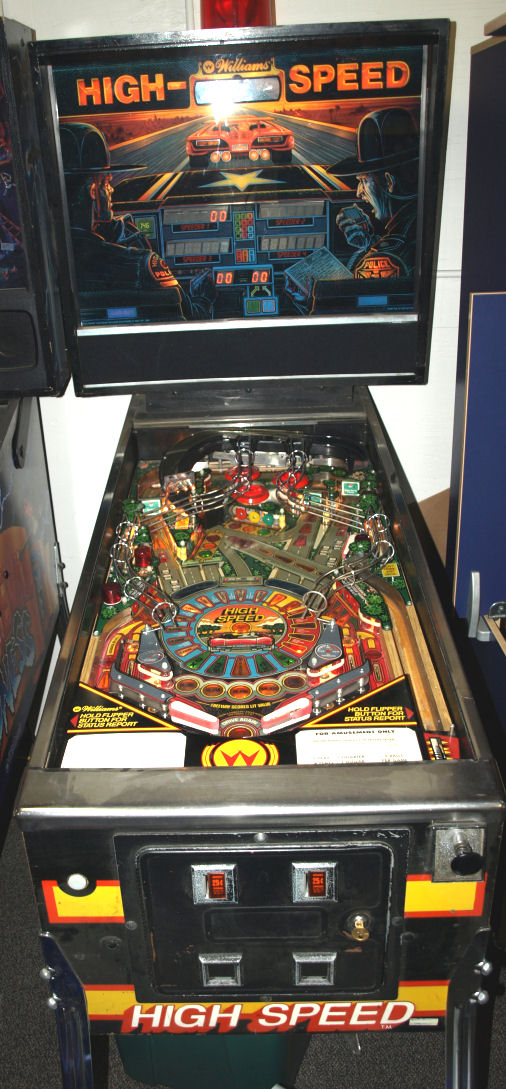
High Speed pinball machine full view.

Direction when starting. Patrol lamp glows.

== Reception ==
In a review for Play Meter Roger Sharpe awarded it 4+/4, calling the game an "exceptional effort" using technological advances to create an entertaining package for the player.

Before release, High Speed was "immensely successful at test locations". High Speed was one of the games (along with 1986's Pin*Bot and 1984's Space Shuttle) that helped revitalize the pinball industry, which had become stagnant due in part to the video game crash of 1983. High Speed sold 17,080 units. It was so popular that it convinced Disneyland's arcade to add pinball, a first in the park's entire history.

Pinball designer Pat Lawlor and pinball programmer Dwight Sullivan stated that High Speed is one of their favorite games.

== Game quotes ==
- "Okay buddy, Pull over!"
- "Dispatch, this is 504. We're in pursuit, over."
- "Roger 504. Apprehend them."
- "Dispatch this is 504. Suspect ran a red light. Over."
- "Dispatch, this is 504. He got away, over."

Upon starting multiball, the game pauses and plays the following conversation:

- "Dispatch, this is 504. Suspect got away, over."
- "504, this is dispatch. He what?"
- "He got away."

=== Machine messages ===
- "Light is red."
- "Run red light."
- "You got away."
- "You escaped."
- "You win jackpot."

== Digital versions ==
Rare adapted High Speed into a video game of the same name for the Nintendo Entertainment System. It was published by Tradewest in 1991.

A licensed version of this machine was released on The Pinball Arcade for multiple platforms in 2014. Its successor The Getaway: High Speed II was also released for this video game. Both machines were delisted on June 30, 2018 due to the loss of the Williams license.

== See also ==
- Checkpoint, another pinball machine with a racing theme.
