= Firepower (pinball) =

1980 pinball machine

- American arcade flyer for Firepower
- Manufacturer: Williams
- Release date: February 1980
- System: Williams System 6
- Model #: 497
- Players: 4
- Design: Steve Ritchie
- Programming: Eugene Jarvis
- Artwork: Constantino Mitchell
- Mechanics: John Jung
- Sound: Eugene Jarvis
- Voices: Steve Ritchie
- Production run: 17,410

Firepower (also known as Multi-Ball Firepower) is a 1980 pinball game designed by Steve Ritchie and released by Williams. The machine had a production run of 17,410 machines.

== Design ==
It is the first pinball machine to use an EPROM chip.

Firepower is the first solid-state electronic pinball to feature 3-ball Multi-Ball, as well as "Lane Change." This allows the player to control the lamps of the rollovers using the right flipper button.

The machine would "queue" scores and then catch up with rewarding points if necessary.

The game includes 31 sounds, and 21 speech phrases. It is the second game to feature speech, following Gorgar. The game uses a robotic script using words recorded by Steve Ritchie. Eugene Jarvis wrote the sound program, and created all the sounds himself.

The game has three holes to lock balls in, these are highlighted on the playfield by using green arrows. Green was used in nearly all following Williams pinball machines, and by many other manufacturers as the color to denote locks and multiball start. It is also the first machine to use transparent inserts in the playfield, which gave the table a much brighter look.

An innovation in the software is "dancing numerals" as an animation; the machine uses a numeric display as alphanumeric displays cost too much when this game was manufactured.

== Layout ==
At the top of the playfield are four rollover lanes (F-I-R-E) located above four thumper bumpers with an additional target between the uppermost bumpers. On the left of the machine is a lane containing a spinner which leads to the top right of the machine and a kick-out hole; a lane on the right also leads to the top of the machine, with a kick-out hole located slightly to the left. The third kick-out hole is located on the left side of the playfield.

The center of the machine includes two banks of stand-up targets, 1-2-3 and 4-5-6. Three further targets are on the right side of the table. On prototype machines the 1-6 targets were drop-targets, but Williams' design of these was too unreliable (compared to Gottlieb and Bally) and were replaced for production machines.

== Gameplay ==
In multiplayer games the state of the machine for each player is retained between balls. Completing the F-I-R-E rollovers advances the bonus multiplier, with the lane change feature called a "great, yet sometimes unnoticed, feature". The lighting of the kick-out holes is controlled by the 1-6 targets, and after all three balls are locked the display shows a countdown before starting multiball. The three targets on the right control the POWER insert. Up to two extra balls could be awarded in a game by the player reaching the maximum 5x bonus.

== Reception ==
In a review for Play Meter, Roger Sharpe awarded the game 4/4, sensing it to be "Williams machine for 1980".

Due to the high interest in the game, production was increased by July 1980.

A later pinball designer, Joe Kaminkow, jokingly called the start button for this machine the first like button.

== Digital versions ==
Raster Blaster was based on this table.

Firepower was included in the arcade game UltraPin.

Firepower released in some versions of Pinball Hall of Fame: The Williams Collection on several systems between 2008 and 2011. It was released by the same developer for The Pinball Arcade, and was available until June 30, 2018, when all Williams tables were removed due to licensing issues.
