= Black Knight (pinball) =

1980 pinball machine

- Publicity Flyer
- Manufacturer: Williams
- Release date: November 1980
- System: Williams System 7
- Design: Steve Ritchie
- Programming: Larry DeMar
- Artwork: Tony Ramunni
- Voices: Steve Ritchie (Black Knight)
- Production run: 13,075

Black Knight is a 1980 pinball machine designed by Steve Ritchie (who also provides the Knight's voice) and released by Williams Electronics. It is the first pinball machine to use magna-save and have faceted inserts, and the first solid-state pinball machine with a multilevel playfield.

Ritchie designed two sequels: Black Knight 2000, released by Williams in 1989, and Black Knight: Sword of Rage, released by Stern Pinball in 2019.

== Design ==
This machine is the first to use PERC software in masked ROM's created by Larry DeMar, natively supporting 7 digit scores with commas. This software allowed for multitasking and the use of timers.

This game uses two-level playfield, the first solid-state pinball game to do so; most game designers of the time, including Harry Williams thought of the idea of multi-level playfields, but how to design one had been elusive. The most difficult design problem was having sufficient ball clearance under the upper playfield with components placed so the ball couldn't strike any of the parts hanging below the playfield. As the ball cannot drain from the upper playfield, the lower playfield was designed to be fast and prone to drains to keep playtime reasonably low.

The game introduced the patented "Magna-Save", in which a player-controlled magnet is used to prevent outlane drains. This is first of a series of four games in 1980/1 that are both two-level and feature magna-save, with the other games called Jungle Lord, Pharaoh, and Solar Fire. When activated the machine controls the time the electro-magnets of magna-save are active (adjustable by the operator from three to nine seconds). Magna-save is activated by the player pressing one of two buttons placed on each side of the cabinet, just above the flipper buttons. When a ball drains down the outlane in spite of using magna-save, the machine laughs at the player, reinforcing the theme of the game as an evil knight vs. the player.

It is the first game to use faceted inserts in the playfield.

The game uses a loud bell instead of a knocker when a special (free game) is won.

After its initial production run of over 10,000 machines, it was put back into production six months later to satisfy demand.

== Layout ==
The upper playfield is reached by three ramps, one on the left, and two on the right. It contains two flippers, a bumper, and six drop targets.

The lower part of the playfield contains a bank of three drop-targets in the middle, with a kick-out hole to the right of these. To the left of the drop-targets is a loop which goes beneath the upper playfield. On the left side of the machine is a further group of three drop-targets.

The artwork features a sword on the lower playfield, and the Black Knight on the backglass.

== Gameplay ==
By hitting various targets the bonus can be advanced to a maximum of 49,000 and a multiplier of 5X.

Each of the in-lanes starts a timed hurry-up shot. The main objectives are to hit sets of drop-targets, and play multiball.

This machine introduced the "bonus ball" in multiplayer games, where the player at the end of a game with the highest score awarded a multiball to play for an additional 30 seconds on factory settings.

There's a five-free-ball limit during game; any in excess of earns score bonus.

== Reception ==
Roger Sharpe awarded the game 4+/4 in a review for Play Meter, calling it an "exceptional, dramatic breakthrough for pinball".

In 1981, the game won Play Meter awards for best pinball, and for best technical innovation for the diagnostics on the front door of the machine.

Due to its popularity, many arcades charged 50c per game.

== Digital versions ==
FarSight Studios released the table for Pinball Hall of Fame: The Williams Collection on several systems between 2008 and 2011. The same developer released the table in season one of The Pinball Arcade in 2012, and it was available until June 30, 2018, when all Williams tables were removed due to licensing issues.
