= Larry DeMar =

Pinball and video game designer

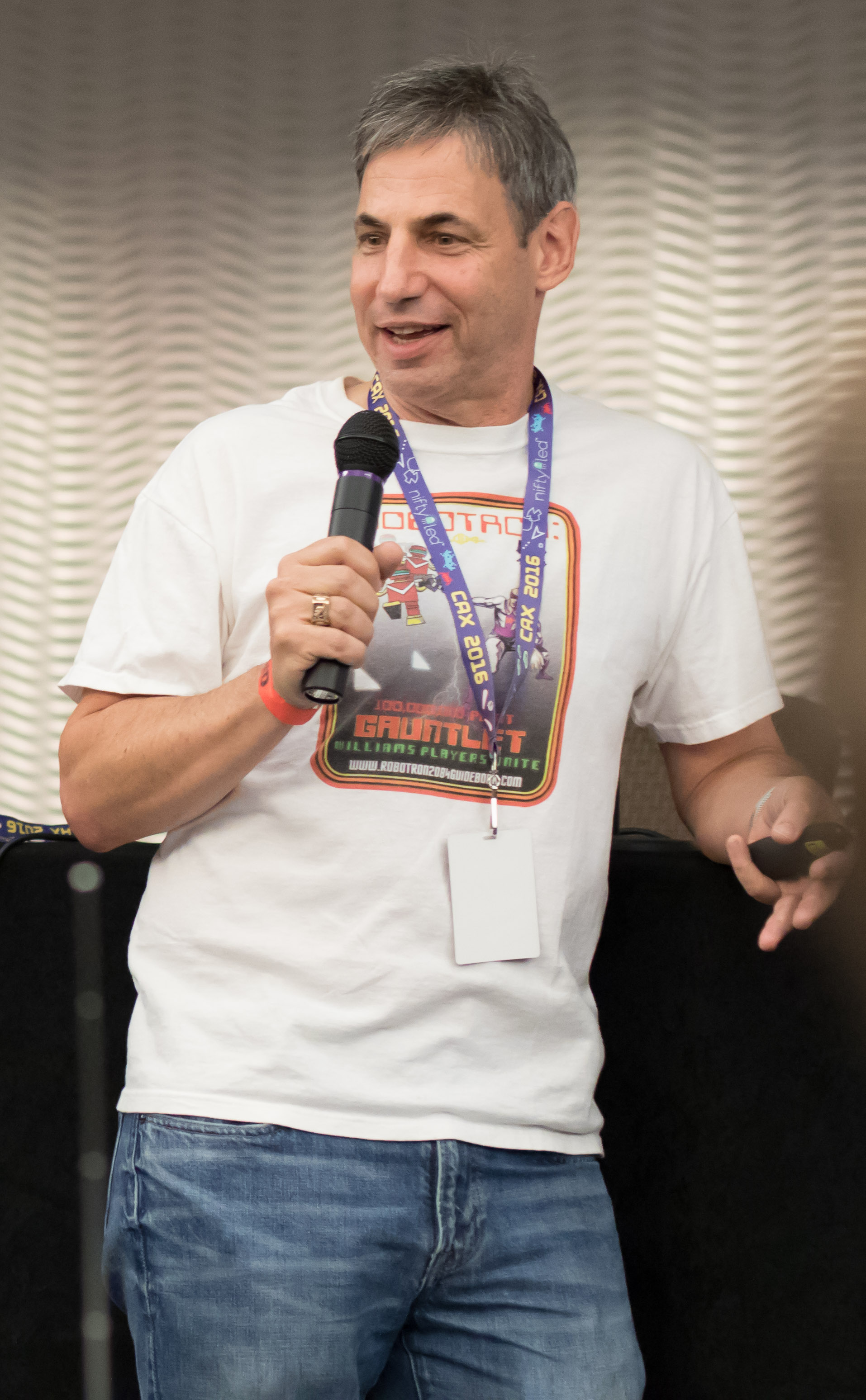
- DeMar speaks during the Vid Kidz panel at California Extreme 2016.
- Other name: L.E.D.
- Occupations: Video game and pinball designer and programmer
- Employer: Leading Edge Design
- Known for: Defender, High Speed, The Addams Family
- Website: Leading Edge Design

Lawrence E. "Larry" DeMar (also known as L.E.D.) is an American video game and pinball designer and software programmer. He is known as co-designer, alongside Eugene Jarvis, of the classic arcade games Defender and Robotron: 2084.

DeMar was a longtime fan of pinball, and he and his family were friends with Alvin Gottlieb, where he sometimes played pinball. He graduated from MIT, and during his time there made notes about the quirks, physics, and logic of the pinball machines he played. After sending letters to Bally, Williams, and Gottlieb with two programming faults he had found, and thoughts about the future of solid state technology he was offered a job by Ken Fedesna at Williams. He initially turned it down to take a job at Bell Laboratories, but quickly reversed the decision to accept the job at Williams.

During his earlier years at Williams he worked as a software engineer. By 1993 he was director of pinball engineering.

He is the founder of design firm Leading Edge Design (LED), which creates gaming concepts for the casino industry. He has 38 U.S. patents, predominantly for amusement games.

DeMar was inducted into the Amusement Industry Hall of Fame in 2026.

== DeMar's games ==
=== Video games ===
- Defender
- Stargate (a.k.a. Defender II)
- Robotron: 2084
- Blaster

=== Pinball ===
==== Williams ====
- Black Knight
- Jungle Lord
- Scorpion
- Space Shuttle: Pinball Adventure
- High Speed
- Banzai Run
- FunHouse
- Jack*Bot

==== Midway (Bally) ====
- The Addams Family
- The Twilight Zone
- World Cup Soccer
