= Roger Sharpe (pinball) =

American game player

- Born: August 1, 1948 (age 78)
- Education: University of Wisconsin, 1971
- Spouse: Ellen Sharpe (1978-present)

Roger Sharpe is an author, editor, professional pinball player, game designer, and activist.

== 1976 NYC pinball hearing ==
Sharpe gained notoriety following a 1976 New York City hearing where he provided a demonstration to members of the Manhattan City Council, that pinball was a game of skill rather than a game of chance, and therefore not subject to legal prohibitions on gambling. While working for GQ Magazine, he was recruited by the Amusement and Music Operators Association to testify, and successfully predicted the position of the ball in a machine arrayed for the council and media in attendance. Speaking at the hearing, Sharpe said "Look, there’s skill, because if I pull the plunger back just right, the ball will, I hope, go down this particular lane." Following Sharpe's demonstration, the council voted unanimously to lift the existing ban on pinball.

In 2021, MPI Original Films announced they were developing a film based on Sharpe entitled Pinball: The Man Who Saved the Game.

== Work ==
After graduating from the University of Wisconsin in 1971 with a degree in marketing, Sharpe took a position as editor with GQ. For several years he wrote reviews of pinball machines for Play Meter in "Critic's Corner", beginning in July 1976; and adding other arcade games in June 1982. He has written for The New York Times and authored a 1977 book entitled Pinball! (photographs by James Hamilton). He served as editor of 1980s publication Video Games Magazine, between 1982 and 1984.

He continued working in the industry, including designing a number of pinball machines, such as Sharpshooter and Cyclopes, which both bear his likeness. He also jointly designed Barracora. He was co-founder of the Professional & Amateur Pinball Association, and has been described as "among the greatest players in the world and one of the architects of competitive pinball." He serves as co-chair of the International Flipper Pinball Association.

Sharpe joined Williams on April 18, 1988 initially working on advertising and promotion, and shortly afterwards becoming responsible for licensing, beginning with Elvira and the Party Monsters.

== Family ==
Sharpe has two sons, Josh and Zach, who have also participated in competitive pinball. He also has a stepson, Seth, born in 1962 to Ellen. Both sons work in the gaming and pinball industry, and the trio all remain active in advocacy and coordinating pinball competitions, all variously considered among the top players in the world.

== Sources ==
Joosten, Jonathan (2016) Pinball Magazine no. 1 (special: Roger Sharpe) (2nd ed.), ISBN 978-90-816266-0-6
