= Play Meter =

American amusement arcade magazine

- Cover of the first issue of Play Meter
- Editor: Tim Meyer, editor
- Former editors: Editors Bonnie Theard, Valerie Cognevich, Steve White, Chris Caire, David Pierson, Ralph C. Lally II
- Staff writers: James Sebastien, asst. editor
- Categories: Arcade game industry
- Frequency: monthly
- Circulation: 3000
- Publisher: Carol P. Lally
- Founder: Ralph C. Lally II
- Founded: 1974
- First issue: December 1974
- Final issue: June 2018
- Company: Skybird Publishing
- Country: U.S.
- Based in: New Orleans
- Language: English
- Website: http://www.playmeter.com
- ISSN: 1529-8736

Play Meter (initially Coin Industry Play Meter) was an American trade magazine focusing on the coin-op amusement arcade industry, including jukebox and arcade video game machines. It was founded in December 1974 by publisher and editor Ralph C. Lally II and it is published in physical form by Skybird Publishing on a monthly basis. Together with rival publication RePlay (founded 1975) it chronicled the arcade industry from its nascency, through market fluctuations like the video game crashes of 1977 and 1983, and the rebirth and maturation of the medium through the 1980s. It is the earliest example of video game journalism, establishing such practices as individual video game reviews and the ten-point assessment scale for video game reviews.

Play Meter served as the parent organization of the first coin-op-oriented spring trade show (forerunner to North America's annual Amusement Expo). It published several bi-monthly and annual special issues throughout its history and it maintains a website where online content is also published monthly.

The magazine shut down after publishing the June 2018 issue, coinciding with publisher Carol Lally's retirement.

== History ==
- December 1974 - Play Meter is founded by publisher, editor, and arcade operator Ralph C. Lally II.
- 1976 - Play Meter publishes its first Annual State of the Industry Report.
- July 1976 - Play Meter introduces its pinball game reviews column, "Critic's Corner" (later titled "Critic's Corner Too"), written by Roger Sharpe.
- July 1979 - Play Meter publishes its first Equipment Poll and adds a redemption section to the magazine.
- 1980s - Play Meter introduces the influential "Players' Picks" column. Heading a team of seven experienced playtesters, writer Steve Harris provides reviews from the player's perspective. The introduction of the column met with interest from industry-based readers of the magazine, and by 1987 Harris and his team were considered "the Siskel and Ebert of the arcade industry".
- 1980 - Play Meter inaugurates its first awards for best-ranked games.
- March 1980 - Ralph Lally establishes the industry's first spring trade show: the Amusement Operators Expo (AOE). It runs for 5 years before merging with the American Amusement Machine Association (AAMA)'s Amusement Showcase International (ASI) in 1986 to become the American Coin Machine Exposition (ACME). The exposition would again be retitled the ASI from 1997 to 2009 before merging with the Amusement & Music Operators Association (AMOA)'s show to become the Amusement Expo.
- 1981 - Expanding sales prompt the magazine to begin publishing twice a month. At this time paid circulation was 5,000; with a further 3,200 unpaid. This schedule continues for 5 years until resuming once monthly publication in 1986.
- 1981 - Play Meter introduces its industry criticism column, "Frank's Cranks", written by Frank Seninsky. The column would continue to run until 1996.
- December 1984 - Ralph Lally is killed in a car accident. His wife Carol Lally takes over as the magazine's publisher.
- 1989 - Play Meter inaugurates its first award for Operator of the Year.
- 1990 - Play Meter introduces its "Video Game Outlook" column to cover legislation related to video games and video lotteries. The column would continue to run until 1994.
- 1991 - Play Meter circulation peaks at 6500 subscriptions. This figure represents a steady increase from 5400 in 1979. By 1995 the figure would again dip to 6000, and by 2014 the magazine would see 3000 subscriptions.
- 1994 - Play Meter publishes its first Family Fun Edition (currently headed by Joseph Camarota III) devoted to the FEC market.
- April 1999 - Play Meter introduces its "Consultant's Corner" column written by Jerry Merola.
- August 29, 2005 - In connection with Hurricane Katrina, a New Orleans levee breaks 4 blocks from Play Meter's 3-story headquarters in Lakeview. Although all employees were evacuated in anticipation of the hurricane, much of the magazine's back catalog including 31 years of archives are lost to massive flooding. The magazine temporarily relocates its headquarters to St. Louis.
- 2008 - Play Meter is awarded a plaque by the International Flipper Pinball Association (IFPA)
- June 2018 - Play Meter ceases publication.

== Special issues ==
Play Meter released a number of special issues.

- Play Meter Buyers' Guide Special Issue
- Play Meter Equipment Poll (bi-monthly) - This issue rates the top performing video games in street and amusement arcades.
- Play Meter: New Products (bi-monthly)
- Play Meter Ranks the Games (annual) - This issue rates and reviews the top ten video games displayed at the annual Amusement Expo.
- Play Meter: Special Directory Issue (annual)
