= Hyundai California Design concepts =

The Hyundai California Design (HCD) concept vehicles were designed at the Hyundai Motor Company's California studio for the North American market. The first concept vehicle, the HCD-1, was a targa-top sports car aimed at the Mazda Miata, and was unveiled in 1992, but was never produced. Other HCD-branded concepts have previewed production models; for example, the HCD-14 Genesis was a large sedan which eventually reached production as the second-generation Hyundai Genesis.

== Studio history ==
After moving its national headquarters from Garden Grove to Fountain Valley, California, Hyundai opened its California Design Center there in 1990. The studio was later renamed to the Hyundai Design and Technical Center when it moved from Fountain Valley to its current location at Irvine in January 2003. The studio is currently named the Hyundai California Design & Research Center.

== Models ==
Similar Hyundai concept vehicles have been unveiled under analogous names, including the HED-x series (designed by the Hyundai Europe Design studio in Rüsselsheim am Main, Germany; HED-1 was unveiled at the 2005 Geneva show) and the HND-x series (designed at Hyundai Design and Technical studios in Hwaseong, Gyeonggi (formerly Namyang), South Korea). In 2006, Hyundai began adding names to the alphanumeric designators for its concept vehicles, and after 2015, Hyundai has dropped the alphanumeric designator entirely.

=== HCD-1 ===
Hyundai HCD-1

Overview
- Manufacturer: Hyundai Motor Company
- Production: 1992 (Concept car)

Body and chassis
- Class: Sports car
- Body style: 2-door roadster
- Layout: FF

Powertrain
- Engine: 2.0 L I4, DOHC

Dimensions
- Wheelbase: 2,400 mm (94.5 in)
- Length: 3,962 mm (156.0 in)
- Width: 1,727 mm (68.0 in)
- Height: 1,016 mm (40.0 in)

The Hyundai HCD-1 (sometimes styled with Roman numerals as HCD-I) debuted at the North American International Auto Show in January 1992 as the first vehicle styled by the California studio. The HCD-1 was equipped with a 2.0L dual overhead cam I4 engine with variable timing and a claimed 150 hp (110 kW). The marque, which had entered the United States market with the inexpensive Excel in 1986, used the HCD-1 concept to build positive publicity and showcase the California studio's abilities, helped by a potential price of US$14,000 (equivalent to $32,000 in 2025).

=== HCD-2 ===
Hyundai HCD-2
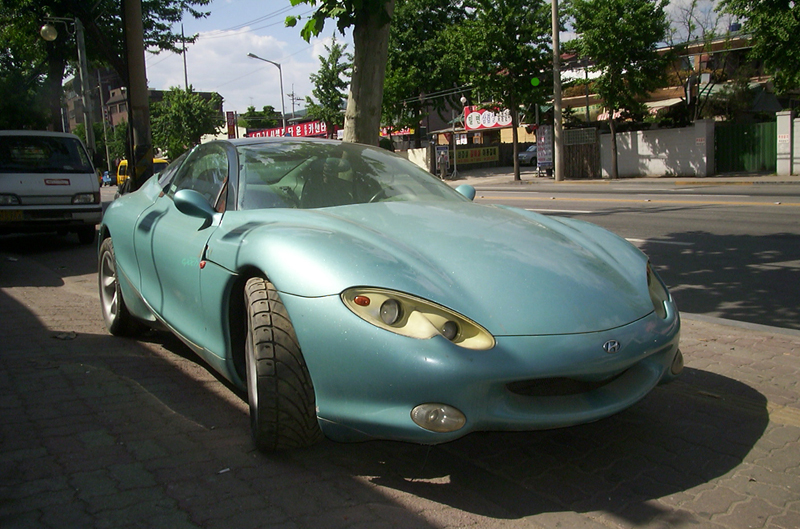

Overview
- Production: 1993 (Concept car)

Body and chassis
- Class: Sports car
- Body style: 2-door coupe
- Layout: FF

Powertrain
- Engine: 2.0 L I4, DOHC

The Hyundai HCD-2 (sometimes styled with Roman numerals as HCD-II and also known as the Epoch) debuted at the North American International Auto Show in January 1993. It shared the drivetrain of the HCD-1, with a front-mounted 2.0L DOHC engine and front-wheel-drive. One of its distinct features was its seating arrangement, with two conventional bucket seats in the front row and a transverse-mounted single rear jump seat behind the front passenger. It is featured in the video game Cruis'n USA as the Devastator VI.

Although the HCD-2 did not go into production, the styling of the HCD-1 and HCD-2 collectively influenced the design of the Hyundai Tiburon.

=== HCD-3 ===
Hyundai HCD-3

Overview
- Production: 1995 (Concept car)

Body and chassis
- Class: Sports car
- Body style: 2-door coupe
- Layout: F4

Powertrain
- Engine: 2.0 L Beta I4, DOHC Turbo

Dimensions
- Wheelbase: 2,500 mm (98.4 in)
- Length: 4,122 mm (162.3 in)
- Width: 1,875 mm (73.8 in)

The Hyundai HCD-3 (sometimes styled with Roman numerals as HCD-III and also known as the Gila) debuted at the North American International Auto Show in January 1995. It was made available for the automotive press to test drive at the Willow Springs Raceway. Unlike the prior HCD-1 and HCD-2, the HCD-3 drives all four wheels; the "all-terrain sport coupe" allows the suspension to be raised by 3 in (76 mm) on demand to increase ground clearance during off-road use. It is equipped with a 2.0L Beta inline-4 which is fitted with a turbocharger and intercooler to raise output to 240 hp (180 kW). The concept had a motorized soft roof that could be fully closed, fully open, or cover just the front seat passengers.

=== HCD-4 ===
Hyundai HCD-4 Santa Fe

Overview
- Production: 1999 (Concept car)

Body and chassis
- Class: Sport utility vehicle
- Body style: 5-door hatch
- Layout: F4

Powertrain
- Engine: 2.7 L Delta V6, DOHC

The Hyundai HCD-4 (sometimes styled with Roman numerals as HCD-IV and also known as the Santa Fe) debuted at the North American International Auto Show in January 1999. It was eventually put into production and sold starting from 2000 as the Hyundai Santa Fe. The Santa Fe concept was finished in copper paint with lower body cladding. As shown, the concept was equipped with the larger 24-valve Delta V6 engine and all-wheel-drive; the rear wheels were driven through a viscous coupling.

=== HCD-5 ===
Hyundai HCD-5 Crosstour

Overview
- Production: 2000 (Concept car)

Body and chassis
- Class: Sport utility vehicle
- Body style: 5-door hatch
- Layout: F4

Powertrain
- Engine: 2.7 L Delta V6, DOHC

Dimensions
- Wheelbase: 2,780 mm (109.4 in)
- Length: 4,600 mm (181.1 in)
- Width: 1,500 mm (59.1 in)
- Height: 1,580 mm (62.2 in)

The Hyundai HCD-5 (sometimes styled with Roman numerals as HCD-V and also known as the Crosstour) debuted at the Chicago Auto Show in February 2000. The HCD-5 had a drivetrain similar to that of the contemporaneous Santa Fe, with a 2.7L Delta V6 engine, automatic transmission, and all-wheel-drive. Hyundai billed it as a "multi-purpose sedan", combining aspects of a sport utility vehicle, sports car, station wagon, and minivan with seating for four, which "exudes both a retro and sporty feel". Visibility was aided by removing the B-pillar and making the A- and C-pillars as thin as possible. The driver's position was intended to be used as a mobile office when parked.

In a 2010 retrospective, journalist Reilly Brennan called the concept "an abject failure" and noted "each section of the car seems to have been designed on its own, with little regard to pulling it all together".

=== HCD-6 ===
Hyundai HCD-6

Overview
- Manufacturer: Hyundai Motor Company
- Production: 2001 (Concept car)
- Designer: Dragan Vukadinovic

Body and chassis
- Class: Sports car
- Body style: 2-door roadster
- Layout: MR

Powertrain
- Engine: 2.7 L Delta V6

Dimensions
- Wheelbase: 96.5 in (2,451 mm)
- Length: 159 in (4,039 mm)
- Width: 68.9 in (1,750 mm)
- Height: 45.3 in (1,151 mm)

The Hyundai HCD-6 (also styled without the hyphen as HCD6) was a mid-engine roadster concept car made by the Hyundai Motor Company. The HCD-6 was first unveiled at the Chicago Auto Show on February 7, 2001. The car was styled by the Hyundai California Design Studio and it was described by Hyundai as an "affordable exotic". Exterior styling features on the HCD-6 include body sides shaped to direct air to the engine compartment, a single roll bar integrated into the center console, floating carbon-fiber bumpers, a 3-stage DuPont Mysteria paint system, see-through engine cover and a unique lighting system with driving lights that turn with the wheels. The HCD-6 is powered by a modified 2.7 liter Hyundai Delta V6, which is also found in the first-generation Hyundai Santa Fe. The exterior design team was led by Dragan Vukadinovic while the interior design was led by Andrew Kort; shapes in the interior were meant to evoke the sports of windsurfing and kite flying.

The HCD6 was featured in several games in the popular Gran Turismo franchise of car racing video games, including Gran Turismo 4, PSP, 5, and 6. Car and Driver was tepid on the concept's styling, saying "you be the judge. We'll say only that it's unique."

=== HCD-7 ===
Hyundai HCD-7
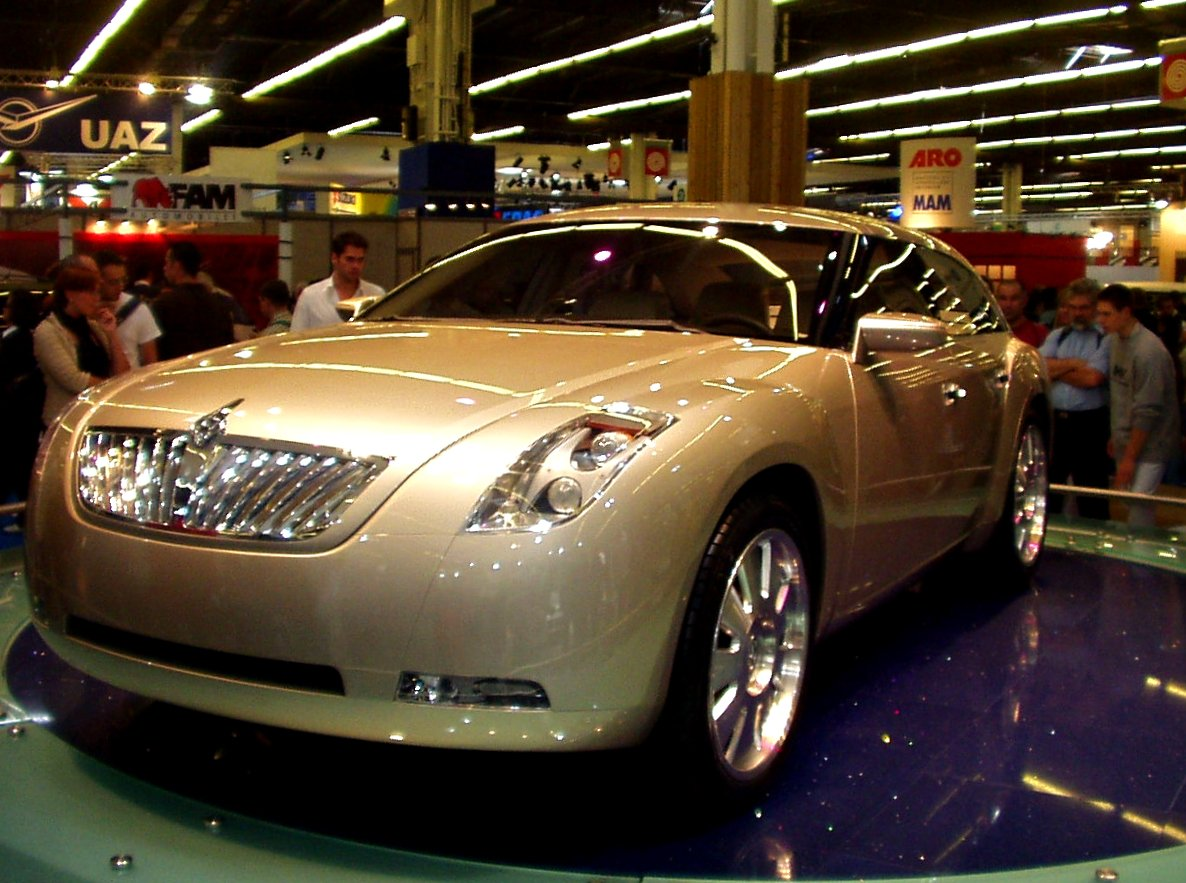

Overview
- Production: 2002 (Concept car)
- Designer: Roger Flores (exterior); Martin Frost(interior)

Body and chassis
- Class: Sedan
- Body style: 4-door saloon
- Layout: FF?

Powertrain
- Engine: 4.5 L Omega V8, DOHC

Dimensions
- Wheelbase: 2,830 mm (111.4 in)
- Length: 4,960 mm (195.3 in)
- Width: 1,848 mm (72.8 in)
- Height: 1,432 mm (56.4 in)

The Hyundai HCD-7 debuted at the Chicago Auto Show in February 2002. Overall configuration and size were similar to the contemporaneous first-generation Equus (LZ), a large 4-door executive saloon sold by Hyundai in the Korean domestic market. The HCD-7 was equipped with a 4.5L Omega V8 and 5-speed automatic transmission. Styling was designed to evoke aeronautical themes, both for the interior and exterior, which features "a bold grille that is the focal point of the front end, yet still retains a family resemblance to current Hyundai automobiles" and is painted in a "warm silver" color. Instead of a conventional key, the driver inserts an "ignition card", which causes a 7 in (180 mm) screen to rise out of the dashboard, providing HVAC, infotainment, and engine start controls.

The concept sedan was aimed at the near-luxury market, positioned above the XG350 on sale in the United States.

=== HCD-8 ===
Hyundai HCD-8
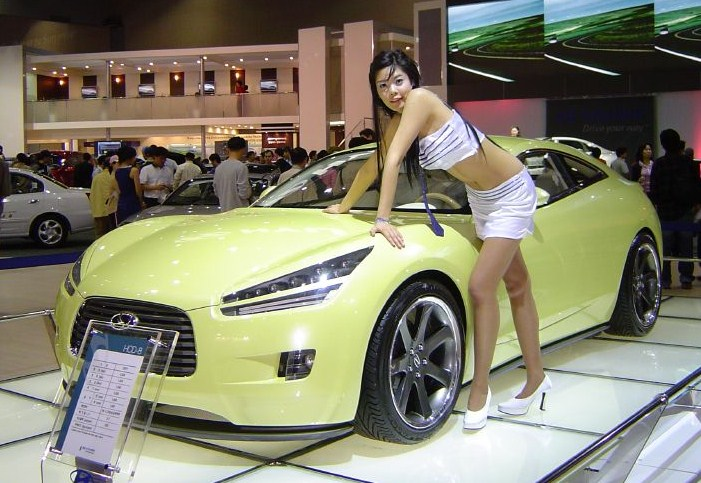

Overview
- Production: 2004 (Concept car)

Body and chassis
- Class: Sports car
- Body style: 2-door coupe
- Layout: FF
- Related: Hyundai Tiburon

Powertrain
- Engine: 2.7 L Delta V6, supercharged

Dimensions
- Wheelbase: 2,633 mm (103.7 in)
- Length: 4,326 mm (170.3 in)
- Width: 1,822 mm (71.7 in)
- Height: 1,339.5 mm (52.7 in)

The Hyundai HCD-8 (sometimes styled without the hyphen as HCD8) debuted at the North American International Auto Show in January 2004. It uses a lengthened Tiburon chassis and is equipped with a supercharged 2.7L V6 engine producing 250 hp (190 kW). Ride height is adjustable and can vary up to 4 in (100 mm).

The design manager for the HCD8 project was Chris Zarlenga. According to Zarlenga, designers were influenced by "the face of the Elantra, the grace of the Sonata, and the stance of the Tiburon". It is the first concept to be designed at the California studios' new Irvine location. The exterior is finished in "Ballistic Yellow" from Nippon Paint; trim is brushed nickel, which is echoed inside with gray leather seating and aluminum accents. The general proportions and layout influenced the later Genesis Coupe.

=== HCD-9 Talus ===
Hyundai HCD-9
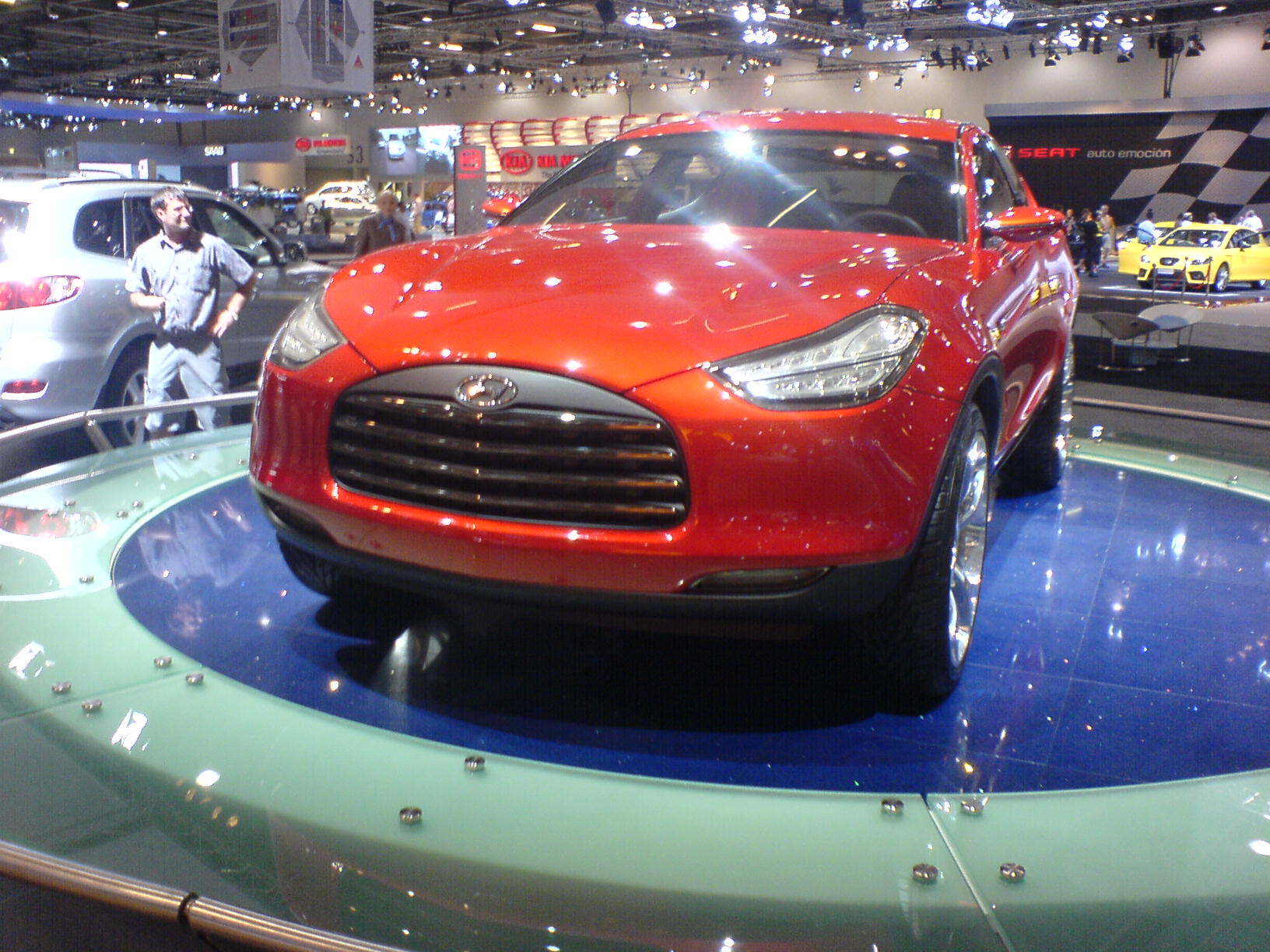

Overview
- Production: 2006 (Concept car)

Body and chassis
- Class: Sports car
- Body style: 2-door coupe
- Layout: FR

Powertrain
- Engine: 4.6 L Tau V8, DOHC

Dimensions
- Wheelbase: 2,800 mm (110.2 in)
- Length: 4,667 mm (183.7 in)
- Width: 1,932 mm (76.1 in)
- Height: 1,578 mm (62.1 in)

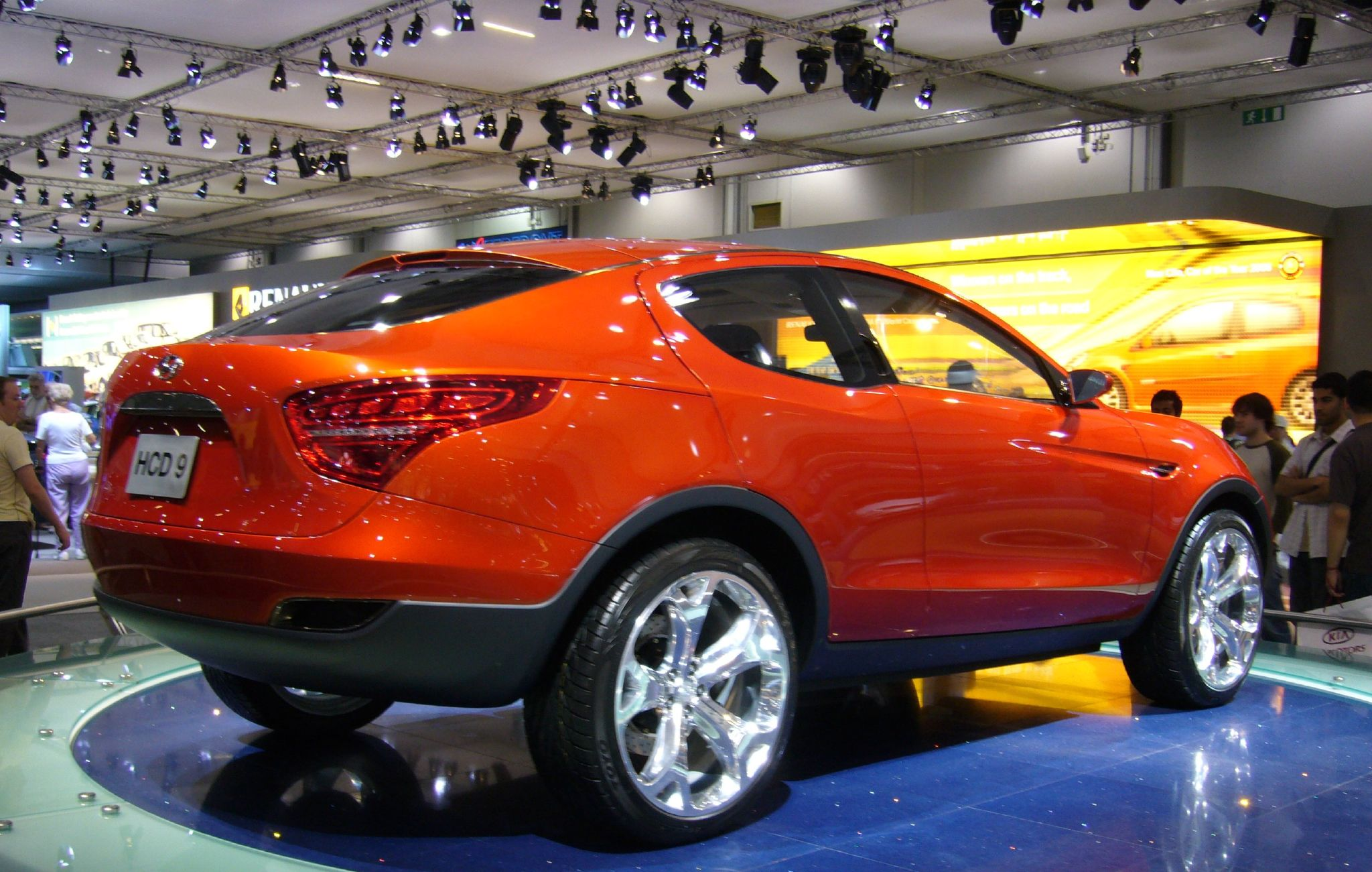
Rear/profile view

The Hyundai HCD-9 Talus (also known as the Talus) debuted at the North American International Auto Show in January 2006. It is fitted with a 4.6L Tau V8 engine, producing an estimated 340 hp (250 kW). The concept was rear-wheel-drive through a 6-speed automatic transmission, and an option for all-wheel-drive was planned.

Joel Piaskowski, chief designer, said the Talus was intended "for a person who has grown accustomed to the needs and benefits of an SUV, but desires the emotional gratification of sports car styling and performance". The second-generation Santa Fe (CM) influenced the "powerful curves and surface detail" of the Talus. The side profile of the Talus featured a dip or kink in the window line for the rear passenger, which was carried over to the production Genesis Coupe. The elevated profile and ground clearance make the vehicle capable of traversing rough roads, and the interior is sized to fit four adults plus their luggage.

=== HCD-10 Hellion ===
Hyundai HCD-10
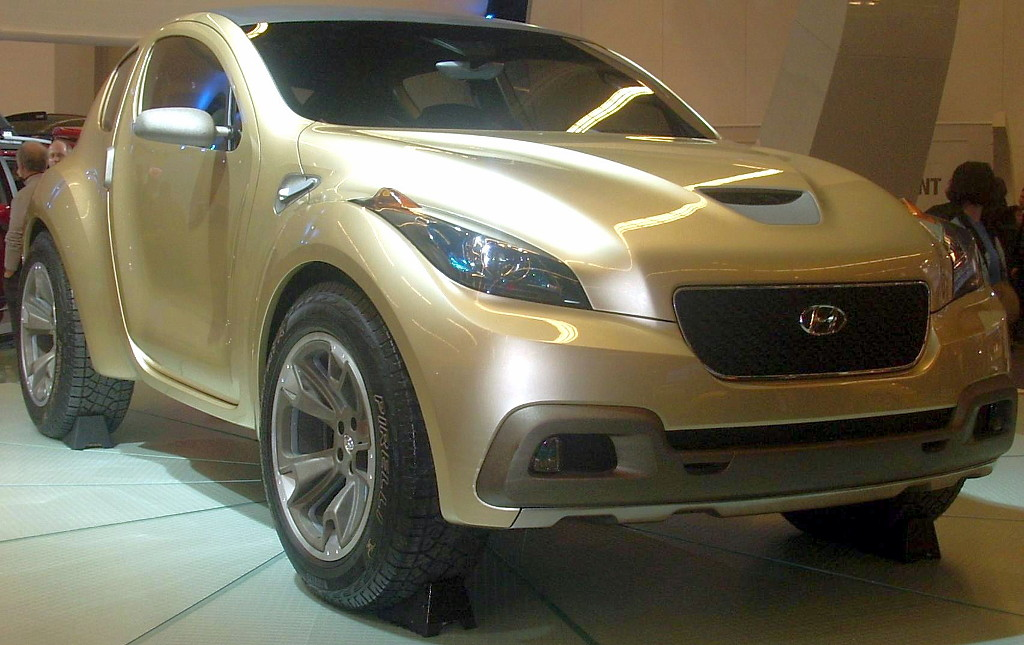

Overview
- Production: 2006 (Concept car)

Body and chassis
- Class: Sport utility vehicle
- Body style: 3-door hatchback
- Layout: F4

Powertrain
- Engine: 3.0 L S CRD V6, DOHC

Dimensions
- Wheelbase: 2,555 mm (100.6 in)
- Length: 4,171 mm (164.2 in)
- Width: 1,890.4 mm (74.4 in)
- Height: 1,559.3 mm (61.4 in)

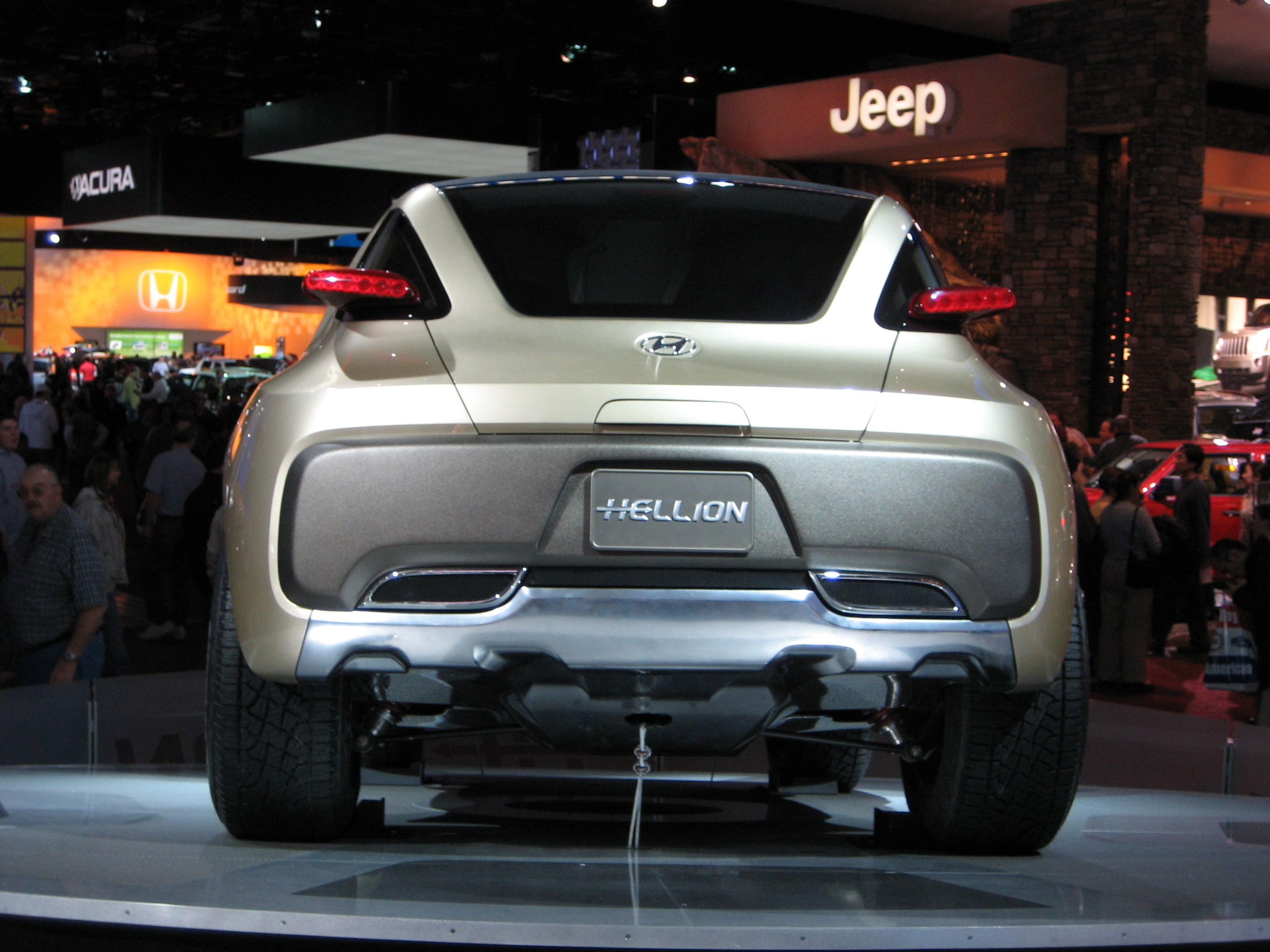
rear

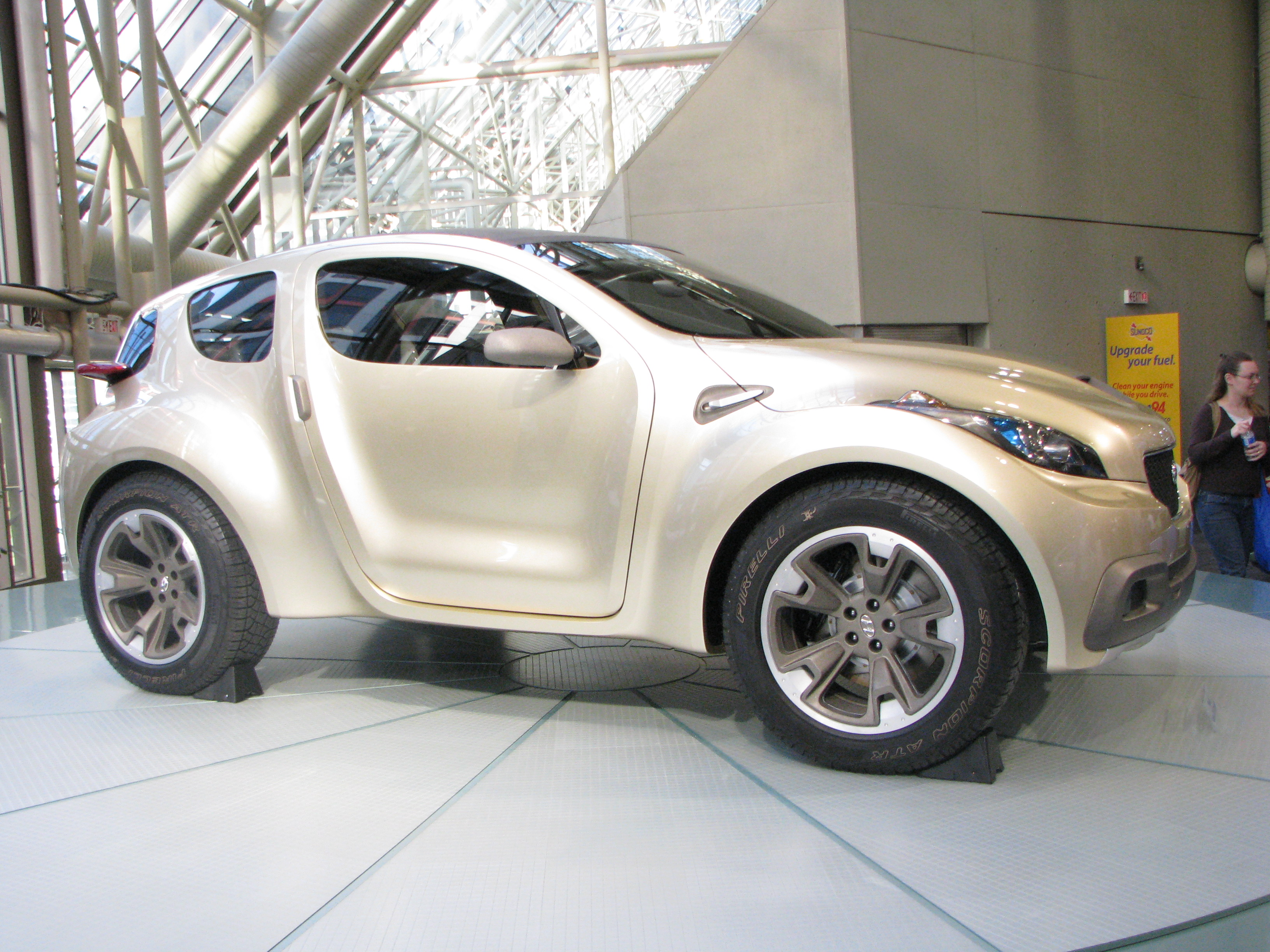
profile

The Hyundai HCD-10 Hellion debuted at the Los Angeles Auto Show in November 2006. It is equipped with a 3.0L S common rail diesel V6 engine, coupled to a 6-speed automatic transmission and four-wheel-drive. Output is 236 hp (176 kW) and 332 lb⋅ft (450 N⋅m).

According to chief designer Joel Piaskowski, the design declares "attitude and independence ... inspired by an insect's tough exoskeleton", with three prominent transverse ribs attached to a central "spine" running the length of the roof. The front end design explored styling that could be used on a future pickup truck, and the prominent scoops were inspired by off-road rally racing. The concept was equipped with a retractable canvas roof that had a subtle camouflage pattern; Hyundai stated that "any pattern is possible from the factory".

=== HCD-11 Nuvis ===
Hyundai HCD-11 Nuvis
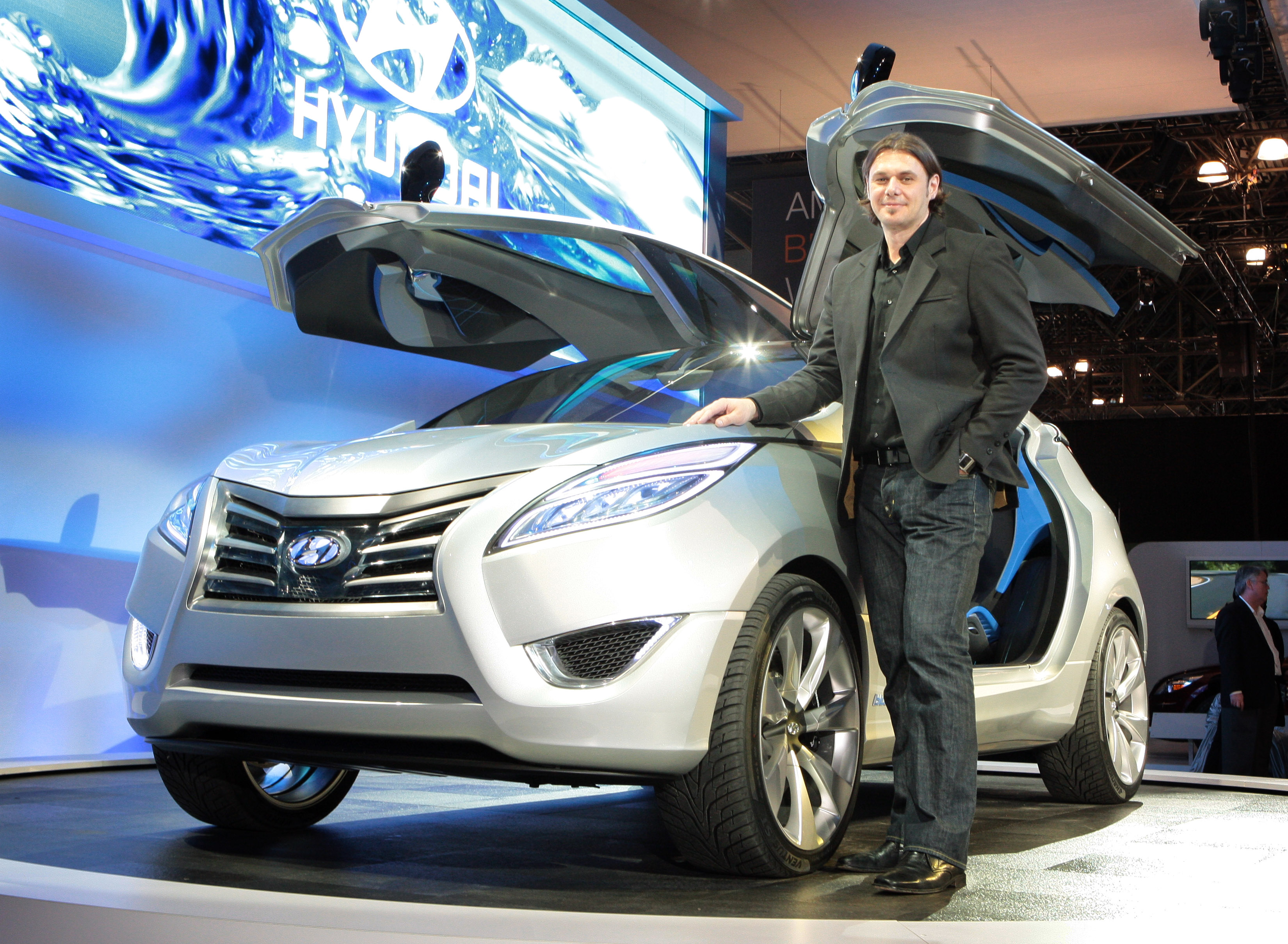
- Nuvis and Hyundai design chief John Krsteski

Overview
- Production: 2009 (Concept car)

Body and chassis
- Class: Sport utility vehicle
- Body style: 3-door hatchback
- Layout: FF

Powertrain
- Engine: 2.4 L Theta II I4, parallel hybrid

Dimensions
- Length: 4,780 mm (188.3 in)
- Width: 1,970 mm (77.6 in)
- Height: 1,660 mm (65.3 in)
- Curb weight: 1,500 kg (3,400 lb)

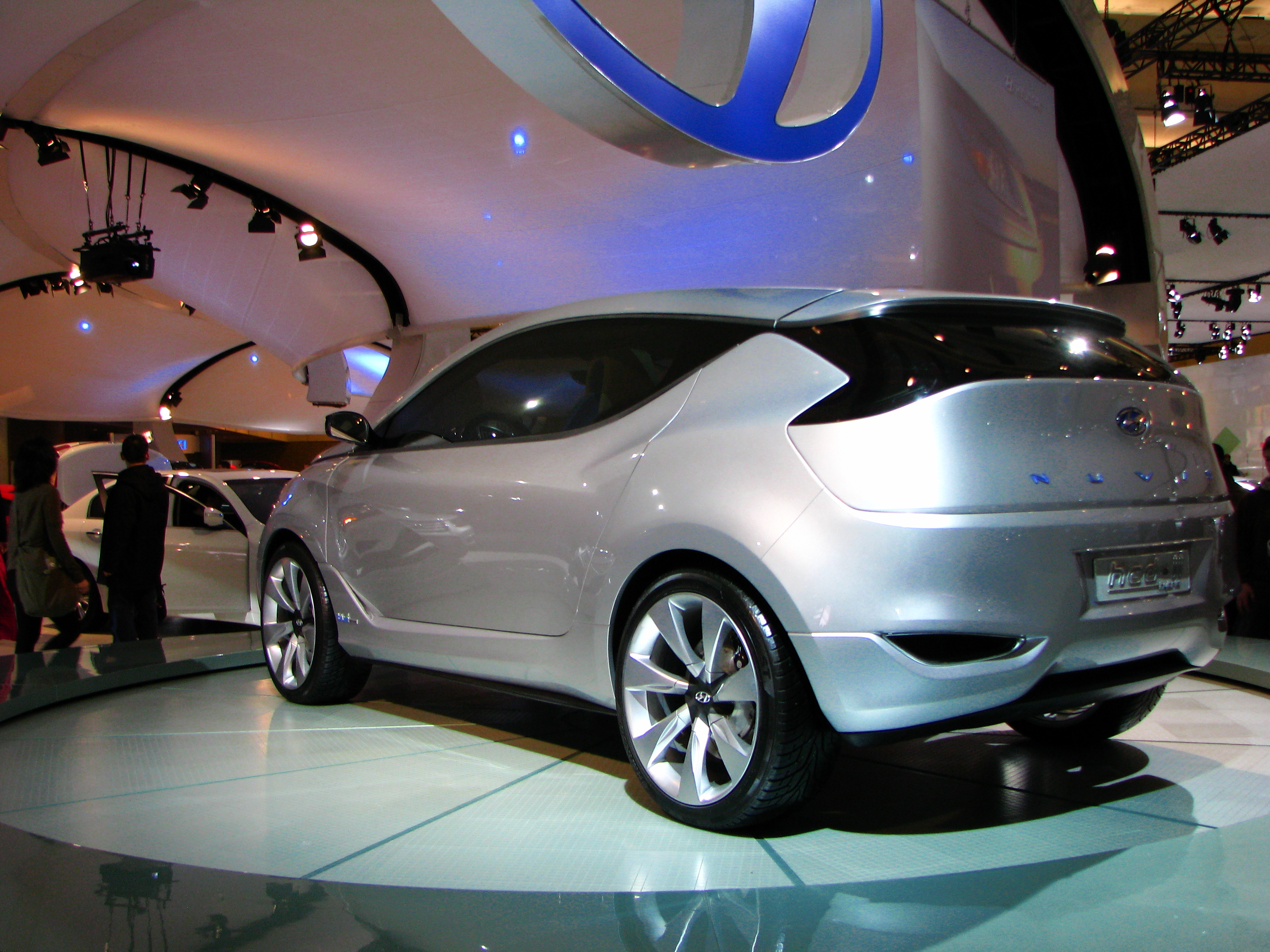
Rear/side profile

The Hyundai HCD-11 Nuvis debuted at the New York Auto Show in April 2009. It is driven by a 2.4L Theta II I4 coupled to a 6-speed automatic transmission, an electric assist motor, and a 270 V, 5.3 A-hr lithium-polymer battery, which Hyundai calls its Hybrid Blue Drive architecture; the electric motor has an output of 30 kW (40 hp) and 205 N⋅m (151 lbf⋅ft). The use of a lithium-polymer chemistry allows flexibility for the packaging of the battery. The combined output is estimated at 170 kW (228 hp).

Continuing the ecologically-aware theme, the interior fabrics were made using 100% recycled materials. The engine automatically stops when the car is at rest to increase fuel economy, which is estimated at 34 / 35 mpg_{‑US} (6.9 / 6.7 L/100 km) on the EPA city/highway driving cycles, respectively. Two large gull-wing doors provide access for the driver and up to three passengers. According to Hyundai design manager John Krsteski, "there are no lines on or in this car that are standing still."

=== HCD-12 Curb ===
Hyundai HCD-12 Curb
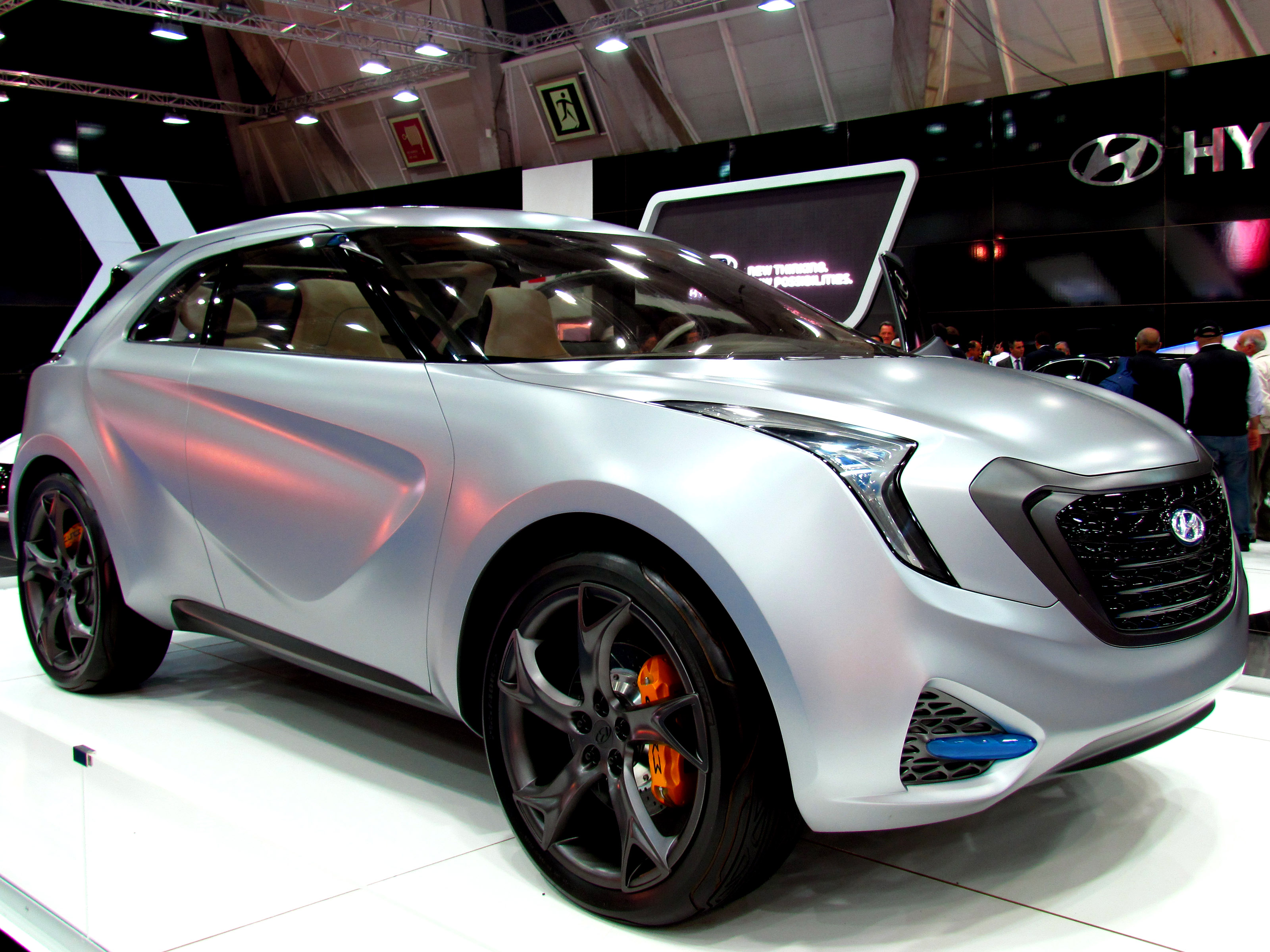

Overview
- Production: 2011 (Concept car)

Body and chassis
- Class: Sport utility vehicle
- Body style: 5-door hatchback
- Layout: FF

Powertrain
- Engine: 1.6 L Gamma I4, turbo GDI

Dimensions
- Wheelbase: 2,640 mm (103.9 in)
- Length: 4,780 mm (188.3 in)
- Width: 1,970 mm (77.6 in)
- Height: 1,660 mm (65.3 in)
- Curb weight: 1,300 kg (2,800 lb)

The Hyundai HCD-12 Curb debuted at the North American International Auto Show in January 2011. It is powered by a turbocharged gasoline direct-injection 1.6L Gamma I4 with an estimated output of 175 hp (130 kW) and 169 lb⋅ft (229 N⋅m).

The Curb design team stated the overall theme was "technology rugged", building on Hyundai's corporate "Fluidic Sculpture" design direction with a vehicle that was "loaded with technology" and "at home in an urban environment with potholes and densely packed nightclubs on the streets." Overall size is comparable to Hyundai's smallest model, the Accent. The windshield glass wraps around the side windows in a manner reminiscent of the visor of a motorcycle helmet; forward visibility is aided by A-pillar trusses, which the design team likened to the architecture of Santiago Calatrava.

=== HCD-13 ===
Because the number 13 is considered unlucky in the United States, there was no HCD-13 concept.

=== HCD-14 Genesis ===
Hyundai HCD-14 Genesis
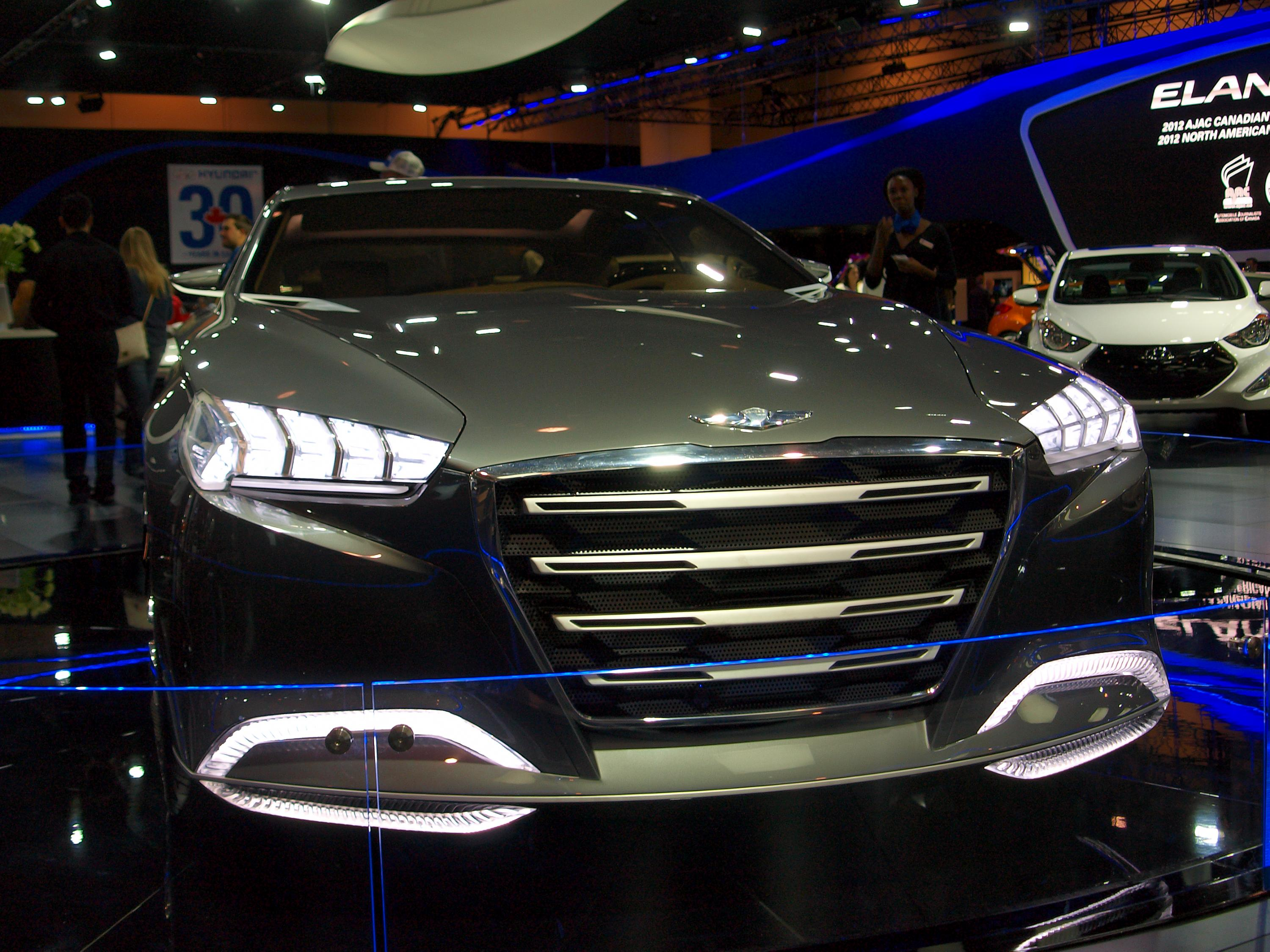

Overview
- Production: 2013 (Concept car)

Body and chassis
- Class: executive
- Body style: 4-door saloon
- Layout: FR

Powertrain
- Engine: 5.0 L Tau V8, GDI

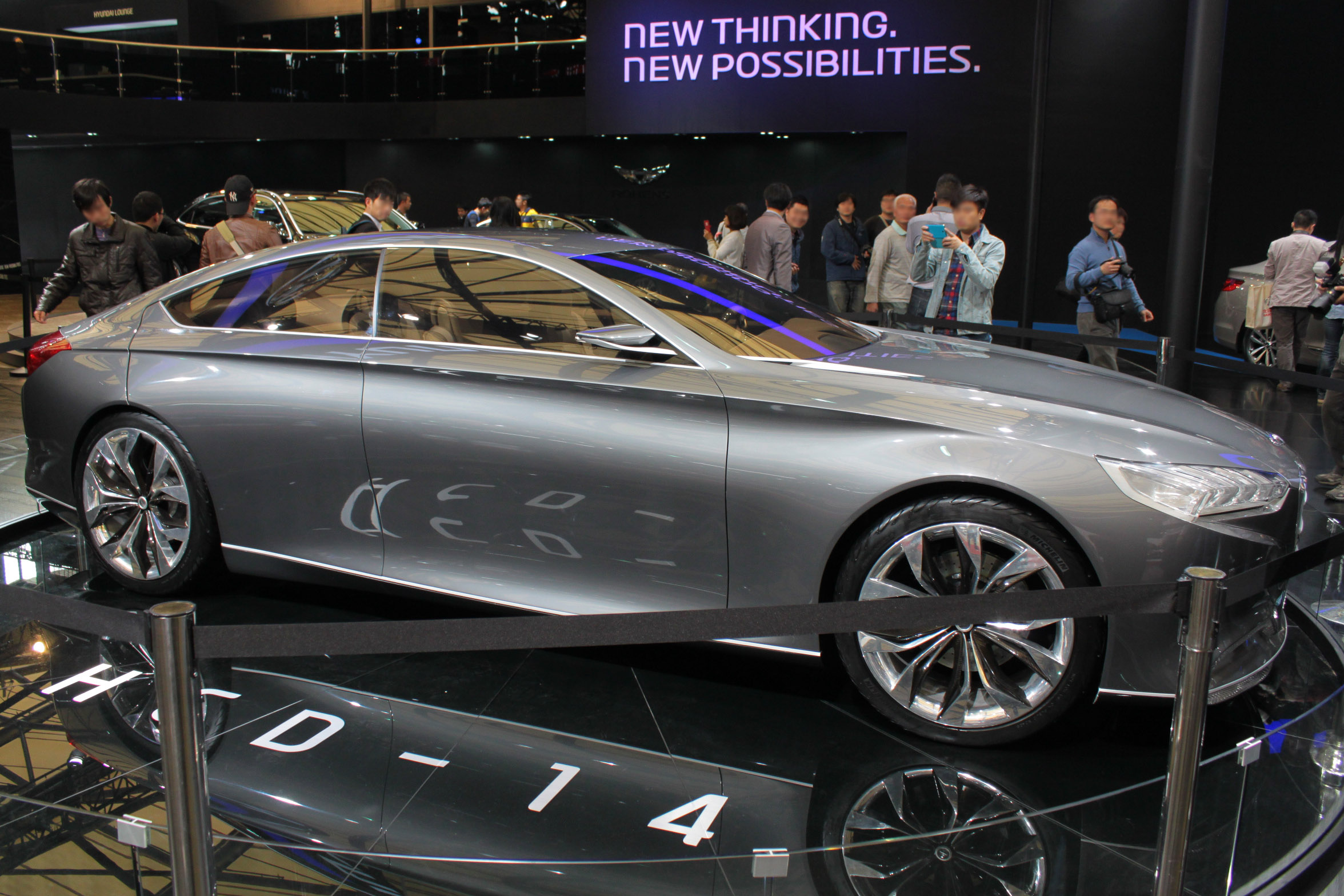
side profile

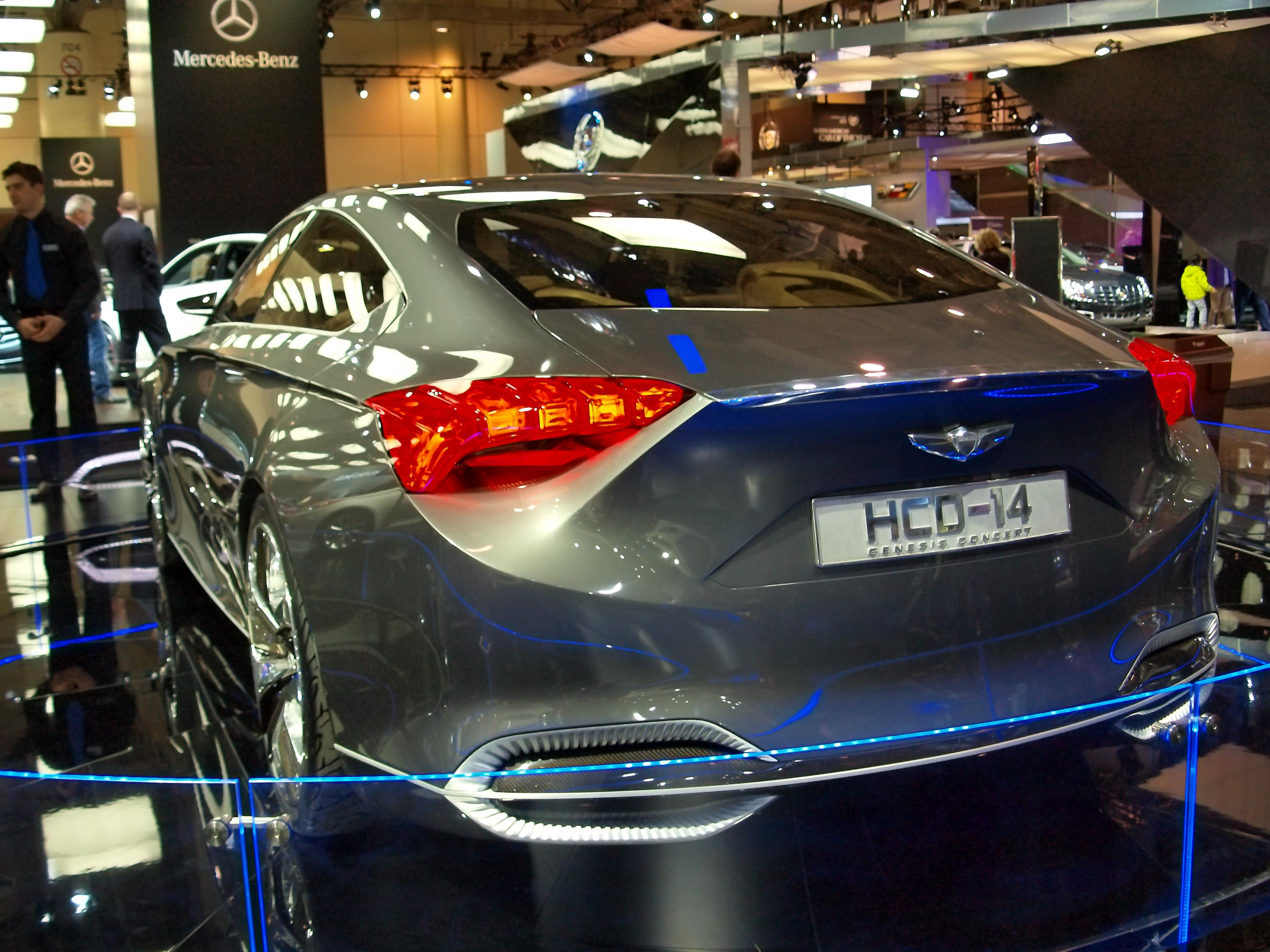
rear

The Hyundai HCD-14 Genesis concept debuted at the 2013 North American International Auto Show in January 2013. It is powered by a 5.0L gasoline direct-injection Tau V8 engine coupled to an 8-speed automatic transmission. AutoWeek named the HCD-14 Genesis as its "Best Concept" of the 2013 NAIAS.

The Genesis concept is styled in the Hyundai corporate design language, updated as "Fluidic Precision". It incorporates a long hood, sloping roofline, and short deck reminiscent of a sports coupe. The rear doors are hinged at the rear edges.

=== HCD-15 Santa Cruz ===
Hyundai HCD-15 Santa Cruz
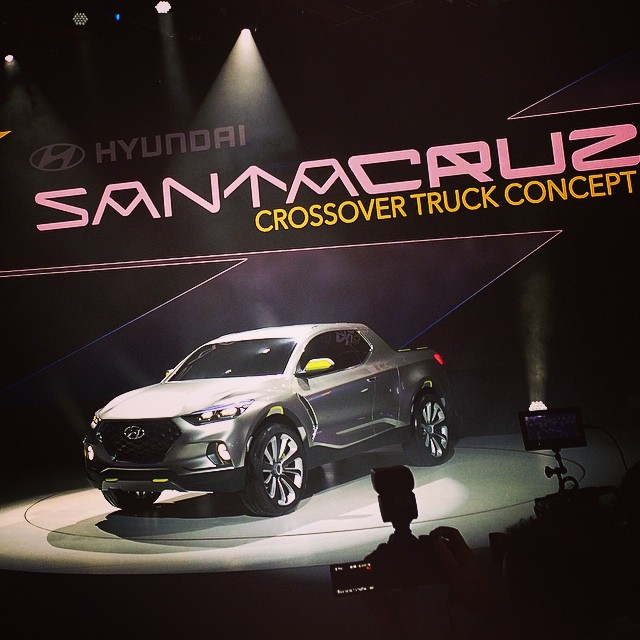

Overview
- Production: 2015 (Concept car)

Body and chassis
- Class: CUV
- Body style: 4-door pickup truck
- Layout: F4
- Related: ix35/Tucson

Powertrain
- Engine: 2.0 L R I4, turbodiesel

The Hyundai HCD-15 Santa Cruz concept debuted at the North American International Auto Show in January 2015. The Santa Cruz concept was powered by a 2.0L R turbodiesel with an output of 190 hp (140 kW) and 300 lb⋅ft (410 N⋅m) of torque, driving all four wheels using Hyundai's HTRAC system. It shared a unibody platform with the ix35 (sold in North America as the Tucson). Although the designers insisted it was not a pickup truck, it was aimed at the car-based utility vehicle market pioneered by the Chevrolet El Camino and continued by the Ford Explorer Sport Trac.

The concept was named the North American Concept Truck of the Year at the Concours d'Elegance of America in July 2015. In January 2016, Hyundai Motor America President/CEO Dave Zuchowski stated "we're waiting more for an announcement than we are for an approval [from the head office in Korea]", all but confirming the concept would eventually reach production. Michael J. O'Brien confirmed in 2017 the Santa Cruz had been approved, and the Hyundai Santa Cruz began production in 2021 at the Alabama plant for the 2022 model year. The lag between the concept and production models was attributed partially to the updates to the Tucson; the concept HCD-15 Santa Cruz was based on a previous generation Tucson (LM, 2009–15) and substantial re-engineering was required for the production Santa Cruz, which uses the contemporary Tucson platform (NX4, 2022+). Compared to the concept, the production Santa Cruz has larger rear doors, emphasizing its likely use as a passenger vehicle and improving marketability.

=== HCD-16 Vision G ===
Hyundai HCD-16 Vision G
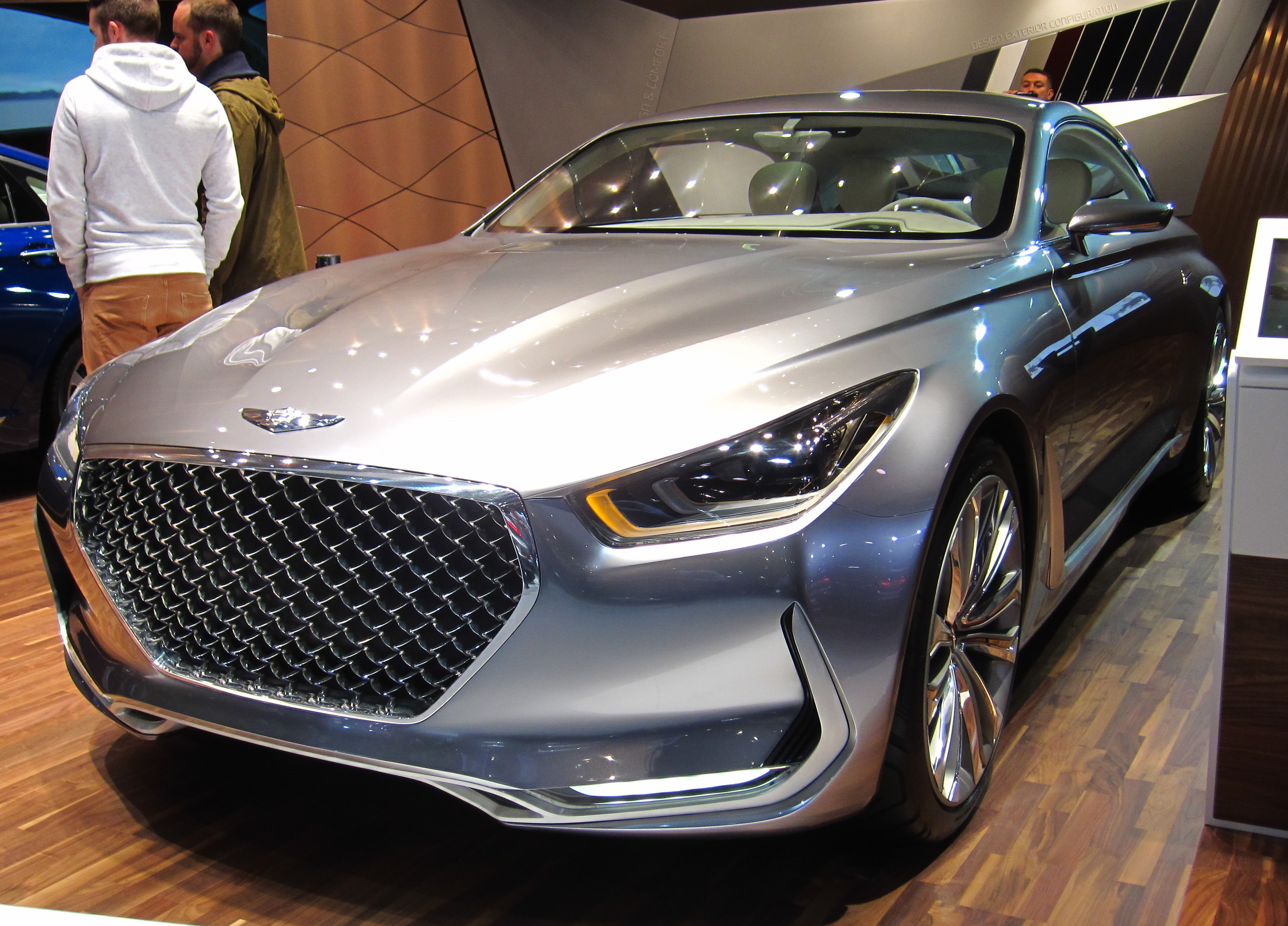

Overview
- Production: 2015 (Concept car)

Body and chassis
- Class: Executive car
- Body style: 2-door coupe
- Layout: FR
- Related: Equus

Powertrain
- Engine: 5.0 L Tau V8, DOHC

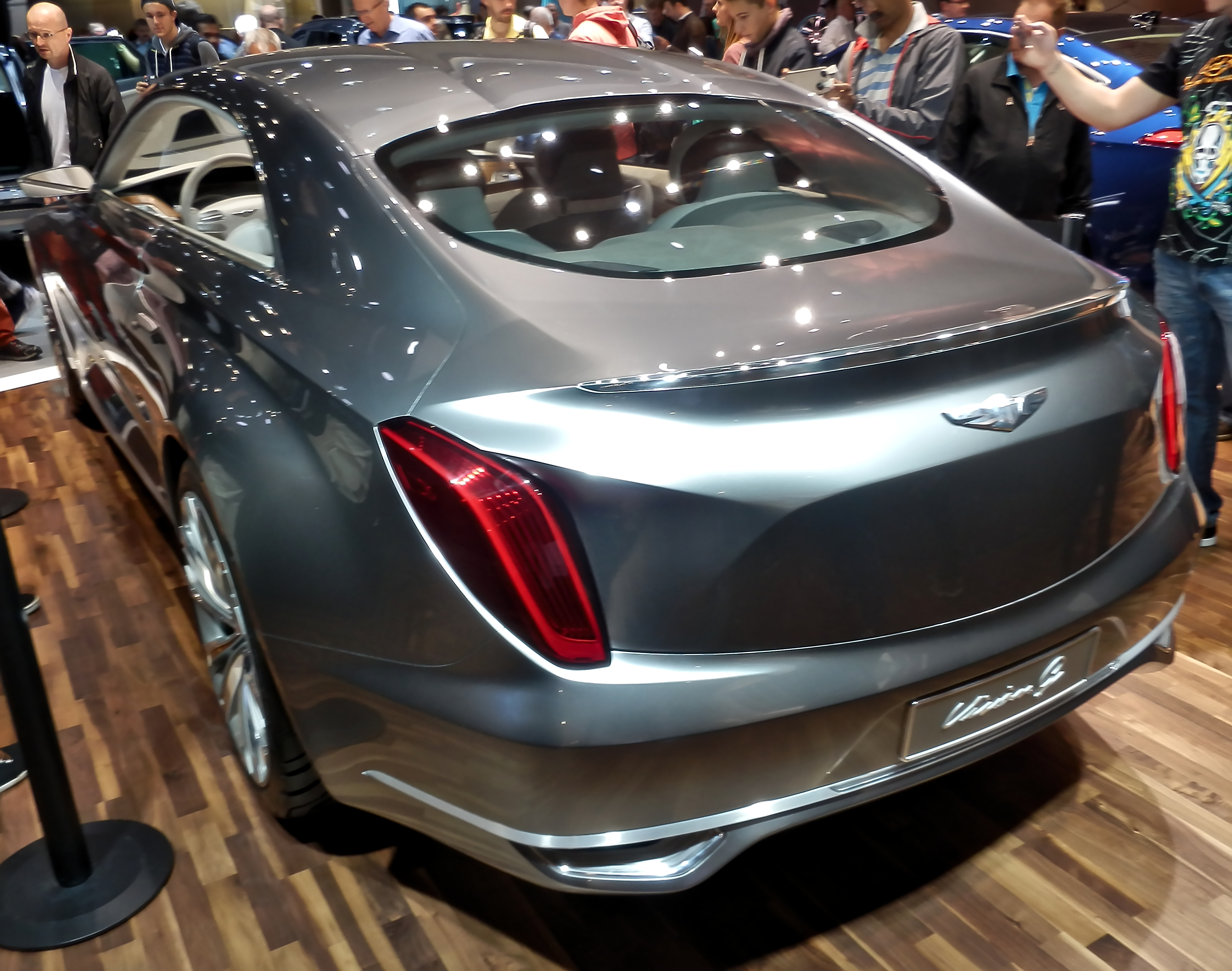
rear

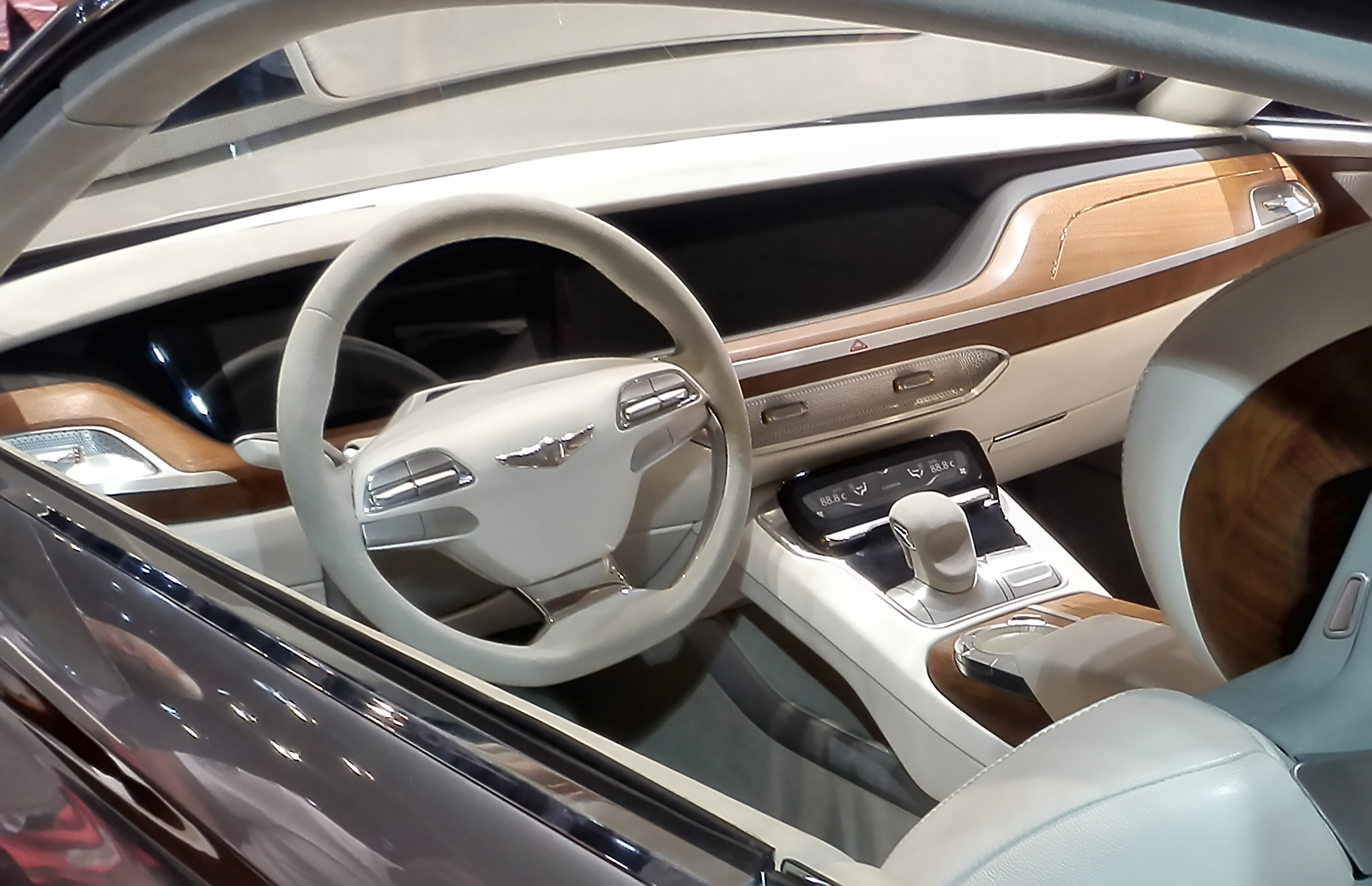
interior

The Hyundai HCD-16 Vision G concept debuted at the Pebble Beach Concours d'Elegance in August 2015; just ahead of the official reveal, the car was unveiled at the Los Angeles County Museum of Art. Although the California studio took the lead, input from Hyundai's global studios was incorporated into the final design. When Hyundai launched its Genesis Motor luxury division later that year, the Vision G was rebranded as a Genesis, consistent with the vehicle's badging. It is powered by a 5.0L Tau V8 engine with an output of 420 hp (310 kW) and 383 lb⋅ft (519 N⋅m).

Early speculation based on testing suggested the Vision G could preview the next-generation Genesis Coupe, moving that car into a luxury touring market. Journalist Jonny Lieberman called the concept "bold and brash, but there are too many odd pieces of flare", singling out the unusual door handle placement (on the body, instead of the doors) and details lifted from other luxury marques. The Genesis Coupe was discontinued shortly after the Genesis marque was launched; although speculation has pointed to a future coupe with an electrified drivetrain, confirmed by later Genesis concepts including the Essentia and X, Genesis have not yet marketed a coupe.
