= Cruis'n Blast =

2016 video game

- Developer: Raw Thrills
- Publisher: Raw Thrills
- Director: Eugene Jarvis
- Producer: Andrew Eloff
- Programmer: John H. Scott
- Artist: Nate VanderKamp
- Series: Cruis'n
- Engine: Unity
- Platforms: Arcade, Nintendo Switch
- Release: Arcade: EU: November 2016; NA: January 2017; Nintendo Switch: WW: September 14, 2021
- Genre: Racing
- Modes: Single-player, multiplayer

Cruis'n Blast is a racing video game developed and published by Raw Thrills. Originally released for arcades in 2016 in EU and 2017 in NA, it is the sixth installment in Nintendo's Cruis'n series. A version for the Nintendo Switch that includes additional modes, cars, and tracks, was released on September 14, 2021. The game was removed from the Nintendo Switch eShop on June 30, 2026.

== Gameplay ==
Cruis'n Blast provides the same gameplay as its predecessors, where the player races on different tracks under a time limit to reach the goal, passing checkpoints along the way to help extend the time limit. The game includes the ability to upgrade the car in order to have an edge in the race. Unlike the other Cruis'n games, this version does not have an ending scene if the player wins all the stages.

The five courses available in the game include Death Valley and Madagascar as easy tracks, London and Rio de Janeiro as medium tracks, and Singapore as a hard track. While Cruis'n USA features a Death Valley track, and Cruis'n World features an England track beginning in London, the Cruis'n Blast tracks are different than their predecessors.

== Development and release ==
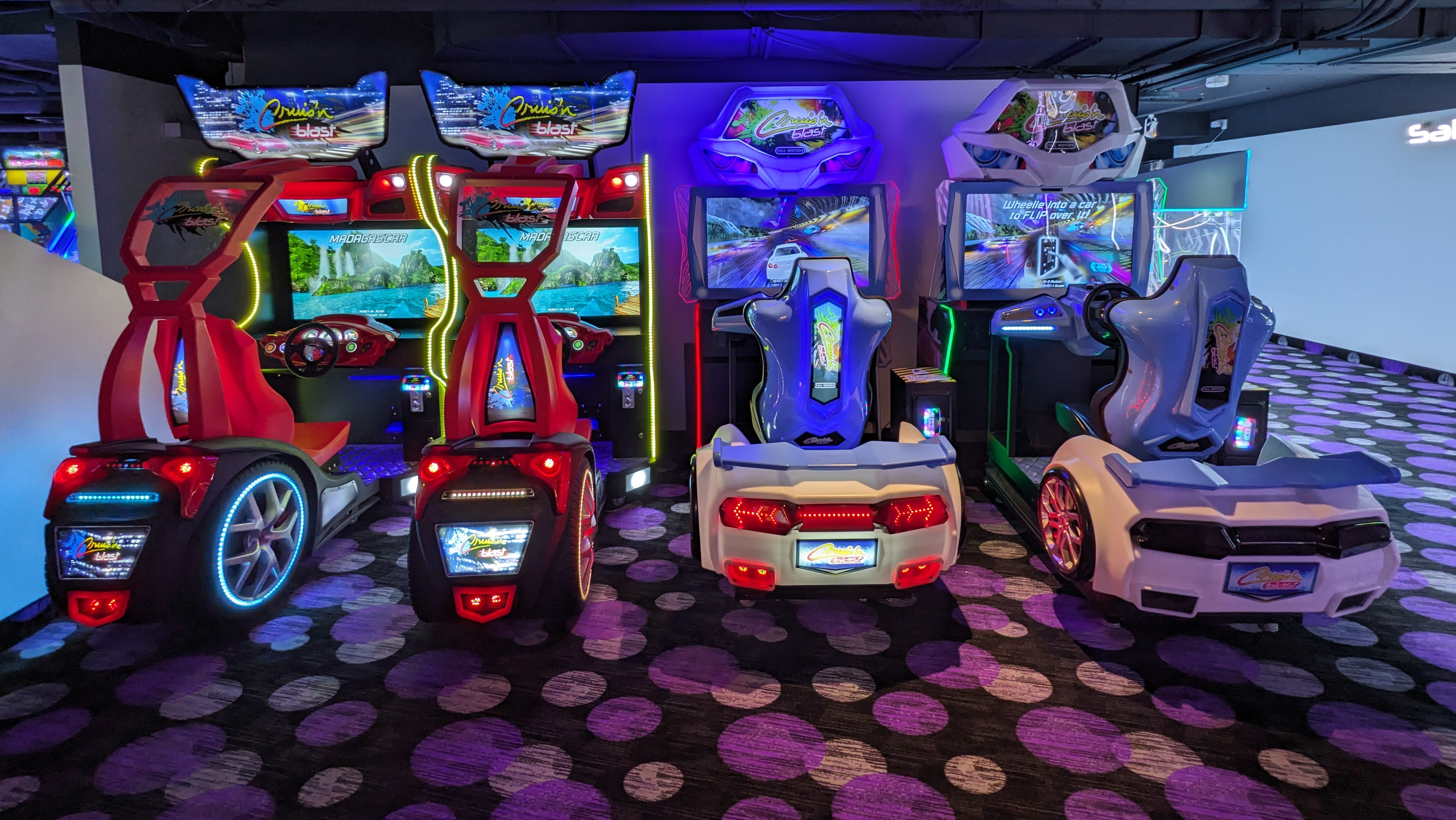
Cruis'n Blast arcade machines: regular (red) and motion (white/blue)

The game was licensed by Nintendo, who owns the trademark for the game. It was first play-tested under the beta names Cruis'n Adventure and Cruis'n Redline, before eventually becoming Cruis'n Blast. A trailer for the game was unveiled on October 24, 2016, on the Raw Thrills YouTube channel.

The Nintendo Switch version was released on September 14, 2021.

== Reception ==
Reception

Aggregate score
Aggregator	Score
Metacritic	(NS) 70/100

Review scores
Publication	Score
Destructoid	(NS) 7/10
Eurogamer	(NS) Recommended
GameRevolution	(NS) 6.5/10
Hardcore Gamer	(NS) 4/5
IGN	(NS) 7.1/10
Nintendo Life	(NS) 8/10
Nintendo World Report	(NS) 7/10
Shacknews	(NS) 6/10
TouchArcade	(NS) 4/5
Cubed3	(AC) 5/10

Cruis'n Blast on Nintendo Switch garnered "mixed or average reviews", according to review aggregator site Metacritic. Polygon compared the action and races in the game to the Fast and Furious franchise while noting that the game feels lacking in certain areas. IGN's review described the game as a fun arcade experience that can get boring quickly.
