= Cruis'n (video game) =

2004 video game

- North American Wii box art, featuring a Nissan Z (foreground) and a Pontiac GTO (background)
- Developer: Raw Thrills (arcade); Just Games Interactive (Wii)
- Publisher: Raw Thrills (arcade); Midway Games (Wii)
- Designer: Eugene Jarvis
- Series: The Fast and the Furious; Cruis'n
- Platforms: Arcade, Wii
- Release: Arcade: NA: July 2004; Wii: NA: November 27, 2007; AU: February 14, 2008; EU: February 15, 2008
- Genre: Racing
- Modes: Single-player, multiplayer

Cruis'n is a racing game developed by Just Games Interactive and published by Midway Games for the Wii. It is a modified version of Raw Thrills' The Fast and the Furious, which was released in arcades in 2004 and was based on the Fast & Furious franchise. The Wii version used the Cruis'n brand owned by Nintendo.

The Raw Thrills development team, led by Eugene Jarvis, was composed of former Midway employees who worked on the Cruis'n series. The game has similar gameplay to previous titles in the series. Despite this, the game was panned by critics.

== Gameplay ==
There are 12 tracks in total and 16 cars to choose from. Players race in point-to-point races on courses based on real-life locations while avoiding various road hazards such as oncoming traffic and construction zones. Players can gain a limited temporary boost in speed by using nitrous oxide, otherwise known as N_{2}O or simply Nitrous.

The game allows players to customize and upgrade their cars' features, such as spoilers, decals, neon lights, ground effects, and engines, which they must purchase with money earned from races. The arcade version uses a PIN entered on a built-in numeric keypad to recall player data, including in-game money earned from previous game sessions, allowing them to keep car upgrades previously purchased.

== Development ==
The Fast and the Furious was the second title released by Raw Thrills, which had been founded in 2002 by a group of former Midway employees after Midway company left the arcade market in late 2001. The game's lead developer was Eugene Jarvis, who had overseen the development of the original Cruis'n arcade games while at Midway. The arcade version was released in Japan by Taito, which is known as Wild Speed.

In 2006, Midway announced plans to port the arcade game to home consoles. Developers Just Games Interactive were hired to port the game for the Wii. After being refused the F&F license (as the home console rights were already held by an unrelated game published by Namco Bandai) Midway decided to brand the game as part of the Cruis'n series under license from Nintendo, with whom they collaborated on previous games in the series in arcades. The port was released on November 27, 2007, in North America, in Australasia on February 14, 2008, and in Europe on March 27.

In 2023, Arcade1Up released a replica of the stand-up version of the game including the original game and the first sequel.

== Reception ==
Reception

Aggregate score
Aggregator	Score
Metacritic	25/100

Review scores
Publication	Score
Eurogamer	1/10
GameSpot	2.5/10
GamesRadar+	1/5
IGN	3/10
VideoGamer.com	2/10

Cruis'n for the Wii fared poorly in reception. The game had an average score of 25 out of 100 on the review aggregator website Metacritic.

Reviewing the Arcade1Up version for Popular Mechanics, Hunter Fenollol praised the unit's faithfulness to the arcade original's graphics, sound, and gameplay, and the inclusion of the seven additional tracks from Drift, but expressed disappointment that the selection of cars available was more limited because of licensing issues, and that one could not access all the tracks at the same time.

== Legacy ==
In 2006, Raw Thrills released an arcade motorcycle racing game, The Fast and the Furious: Super Bikes. The game uses the F&F name but has no other connection; its sequels omit the F&F name.

The following year, Raw Thrills released an updated edition of the original arcade game, The Fast and the Furious: Drift, partly based on the third film, which featured a new car line-up and added seven new tracks set in Japan.

In 2011, a second update to the arcade game, Fast & Furious: SuperCars, was released. It upgraded the game to high-definition graphics, introduced 10 different cars, and added tracks from Super Bikes. Both updated editions were available as new units or as upgrades to existing F&F arcade units. After Raw Thrills' Fast & Furious license expired, a revision of the game removed the branding, renaming the game to simply SuperCars.

In 2017, Raw Thrills released an all-new arcade game in the Cruis'n series, Cruis'n Blast, under license from Nintendo, which retained the rights to the series name. The game received a port to the Nintendo Switch in 2021.

Raw Thrills later regained the F&F license, and a new game Fast & Furious Arcade was released on October 7, 2022. Incorporating elements of the later films, it features mission-based gameplay.
