= Cruis'n Velocity =

2001 video game

- North American cover art
- Developer: Graphic State
- Publisher: Midway Games
- Series: Cruis'n
- Platform: Game Boy Advance
- Release: NA: November 27, 2001; EU: February 8, 2002
- Genre: Racing
- Modes: Single-player, multiplayer

Cruis'n Velocity is a 2001 racing game developed by Graphic State and published by Midway Games for the Game Boy Advance. It is the fourth installment of Nintendo's Cruis'n series and the only game in the series not to be preceded by an arcade release and features slightly different gameplay from its predecessors. The game uses the same engine as Dark Arena, a first-person shooter also developed by Graphic State, to achieve a pseudo-3D effect. This approach garnered the game mixed reviews.

== Gameplay ==
Unlike the previous games in the series, instead of racing down one-way courses consisting of streets based on real-life locations while avoiding various road hazards like oncoming traffic and construction, the players travel through a large environment racing eleven different cars and winning without getting hit by walls and such. Fourteen different locations, the same as Cruis'n Exotica, are available.

There is a new speed boost system that is activated by pressing on the gas button twice. There is also an option that allows the player to have a damage system on or off. There will be a damage bar that depletes if the players crash into different objects.

There are three different races to choose from. Players can run through the Cruis'n Cup which unlocks new courses and cars. Championship allows players to go through courses and earn points like in Mario Kart. In Freestyle, players can go through courses to get the highest track record.

The game features a three-player multiplayer mode using the Game Boy Advance's link cable. Instead of a save feature, this game used a password system so that players can save their progress.

== Reception ==
Reception

Aggregate score
| Aggregator | Score |
|---|---|
| Metacritic | 53/100 |

Review scores
| Publication | Score |
|---|---|
| AllGame | 1.5/5 |
| Computer and Video Games | 5/10 |
| Game Informer | 4.5/10 |
| GameZone | 5.7/10 |
| IGN | 6/10 |
| Nintendo Power | 2.5/5 |
| Nintendo World Report | 3/10 |

Cruis'n Velocity received "mixed" reviews according to video game review aggregator platform Metacritic.

IGN called the game "somewhat enjoyable" with its multitude of play modes, while criticizing the collision detection, game-crashing bugs, use of a password system and A.I. They also remarked that the game was significantly less over-the-top than its arcade predecessors. The game's Doom-style graphics engine was criticized by AllGame, which called the graphics "ugly and sluggish" and compared them unfavorably to Mario Kart: Super Circuit, that used scaling to achieve its pseudo-3D effect. Nintendo Power called it a "so-so racing game".
