= Hyundai Nuvis =

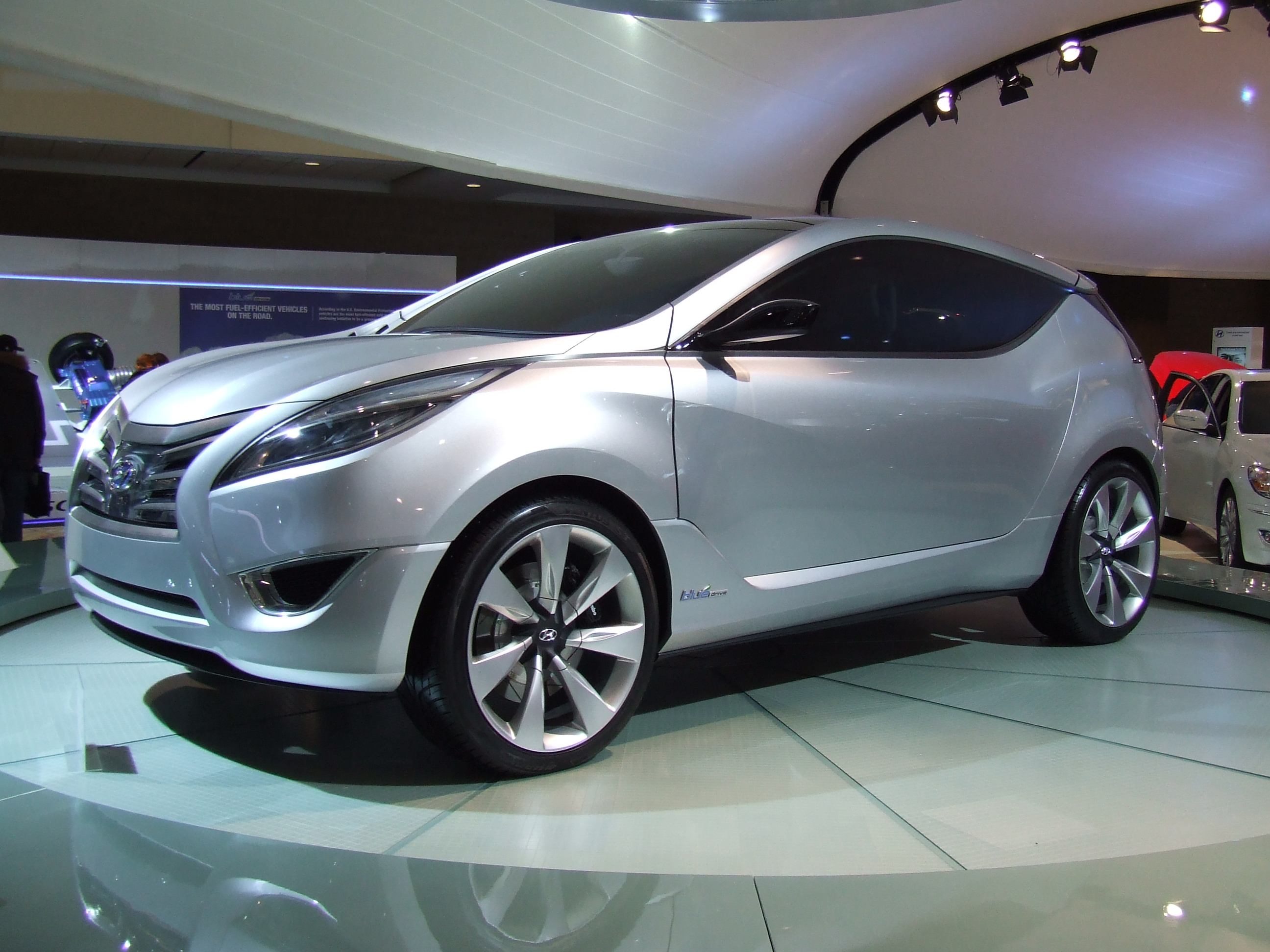

Overview
- Manufacturer: Hyundai
- Production: Concept car only
- Designer: John Krsteski, Arash Badeanlou

Body and chassis
- Class: Crossover
- Body style: 2-door crossover
- Doors: Gull-wing

The Hyundai HCD-11 Nuvis Concept is a concept car designed at the company's California Design Center in Irvine, California. The vehicle was unveiled in the 2009 New York Auto Show.

== Design ==
The design concept was inspired by the interplay of natural, fluid elements with more rigid surfaces and structures to create the illusion of constant motion.

One of its more unusual features is its upwards-opening doors, which are especially rare on SUVs. It is also a hybrid vehicle.

== Specifications ==
The concept's features include 22-inch wheels and gullwing doors.

Interior seating fabric was provided by True Textiles, which was made from 100 percent post-consumer recycled polyester – reclaimed soda bottles – and increasingly sustainable manufacturing processes. Matching seatbelts are provided by Harveys Original Seatbeltbags.

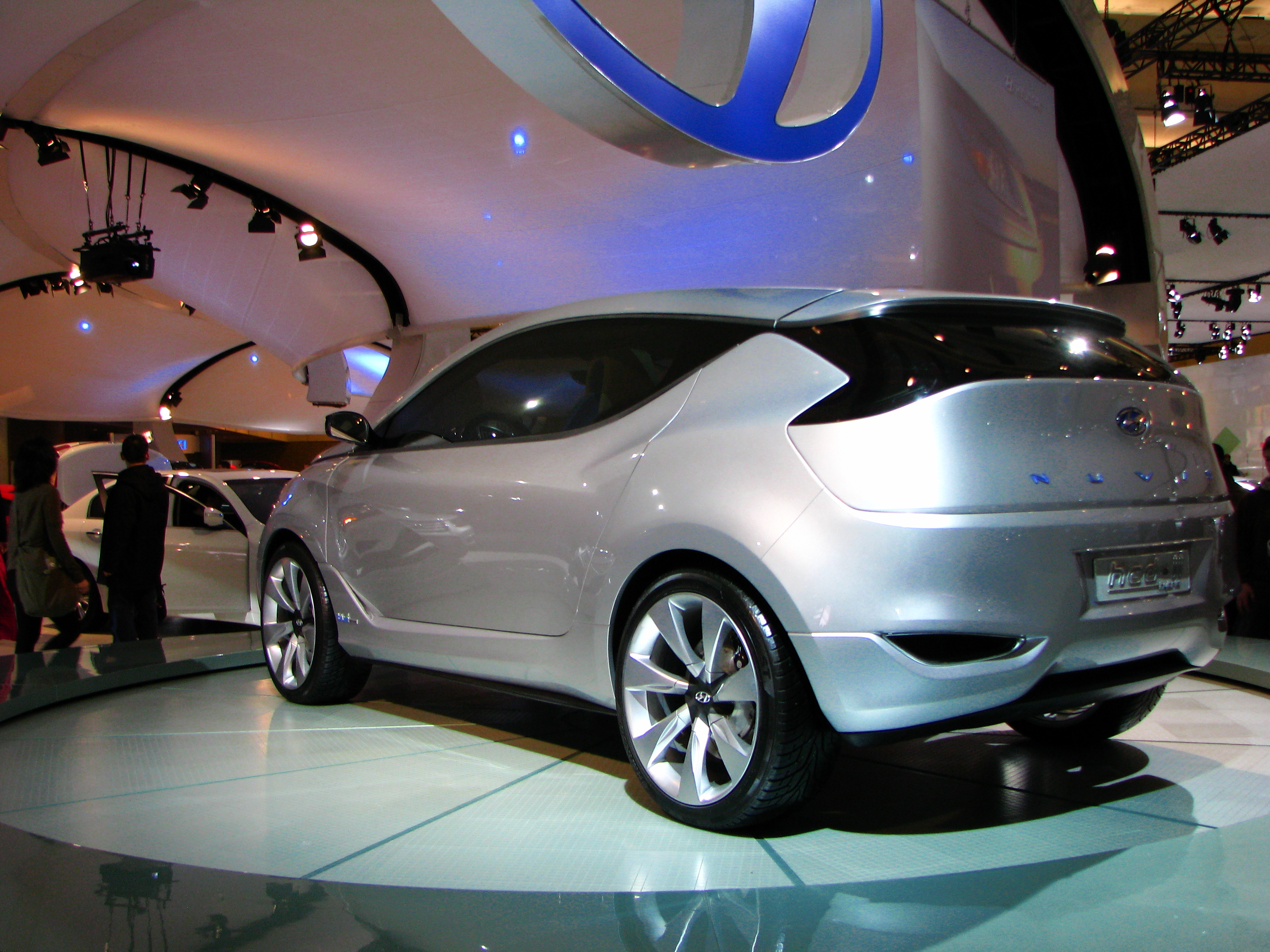
Rear view

The vehicle was powered by a parallel hybrid system, featuring 2.4-liter Theta II engine and a 205 N⋅m (151 lb⋅ft) electric motor with total rating of 228 hp (estimated), 6-speed automatic transmission, 270 Volt/5.3Ah lithium polymer battery pack.

== Marketing ==
Harveys Original Seatbeltbags also developed two matching handbags for the Nuvis concept.
