= Cruis'n =

Video game series

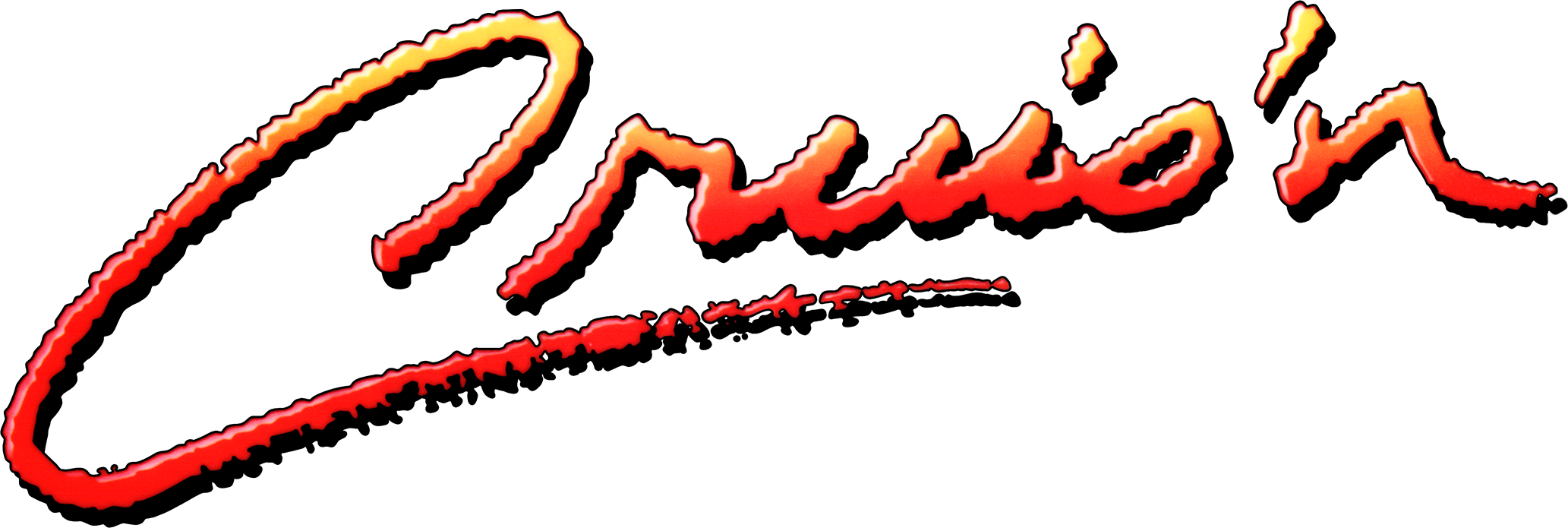
- Genre: Racing
- Developers: Midway Games, Eurocom, Gratuitous Games, Crawfish Interactive, Graphic State, Just Games Interactive, Raw Thrills
- Publishers: Nintendo; Midway Games; Raw Thrills
- Creator: Eugene Jarvis
- Platforms: Arcade, Game Boy Advance, Game Boy Color, Nintendo 64, Nintendo Switch, Wii
- First release: Cruis'n USA; August 1994; 32 years ago
- Latest release: Cruis'n Blast; January 2017; 9 years ago

Cruis'n is a series of racing video games created by Eugene Jarvis and owned by Nintendo. Midway Games published various installments under license from Nintendo. The series distinguishes itself from other racing games with its over-the-top presentation and fast-paced gameplay, featuring a wide variety of vehicles and tracks based on a number of real world locations. The series debuted in North American and European arcades in 1994 with the release of Cruis'n USA, which, along with Rare's Killer Instinct, was advertised as running on Nintendo's Ultra 64 hardware. Two sequels followed, Cruis'n World and Cruis'n Exotica, which featured new vehicles and tracks. All three games were released for the Nintendo 64 as well, with Exotica also being released for the handheld Game Boy Color. The next game in the series, Cruis'n Velocity deviated from the traditional arcade gameplay of the series and was released for the Game Boy Advance.

After Midway exited the arcade business, Jarvis's new company Raw Thrills released the arcade game The Fast and the Furious, which was based on film of the same name and shared gameplay elements with the Cruis'n games. The game was ported to the Wii by Midway with all aspects of the film license removed and released simply as Cruis'n. Raw Thrills licensed the Cruis'n name from Nintendo for a new arcade machine, Cruis'n Blast, released in 2017, before being enhanced and ported to the Nintendo Switch in 2021.

== Games ==
Release timeline
1994	Cruis'n USA
1995
1996	Cruis'n World
1997
1998
1999	Cruis'n Exotica
2000
2001	Cruis'n Velocity
2002
2003
2004
2005
2006
2007	Cruis'n
2008
2009
2010
2011
2012
2013
2014
2015
2016
2017	Cruis'n Blast

=== Original arcade releases ===
The original arcade games were developed by Midway and designed by Eugene Jarvis. All of them have the same general gameplay. The objective in each game is to outrun nine cars in various different levels located in different real world places. Players can choose individual levels or "Cruise" and race each track in order. A variety of different cars in each game is available.

The first title in the series is Cruis'n USA which was released for video arcades in 1994 by Midway. The race starts in San Francisco's Golden Gate Bridge and ends at the White House in Washington, D.C. Arcade units can be linked to provide multiplayer gameplay. The original arcade game, along with Killer Instinct, was promoted as running on Nintendo's Ultra 64 hardware, later known as the Nintendo 64 home console. In reality, the arcade releases use significantly different hardware. Initially slated as a launch title for the home console, Cruis'n USA was delayed for over two months and released on December 3, 1996. It features a downgrade in graphics as well as controversial censorship of the arcade original. In the Nintendo 64 version, most of the levels are initially locked except for U.S. Route 101. Along the way players can race in different difficulties to unlock new paint jobs and upgrades. The Nintendo 64 version can also save progress using up to six accounts on the Game Pak, and an additional six accounts by using nine pages on a Controller Pak. Despite the differences from the arcade original and poor reception from critics, the game was a commercial success and re-released in 1998 as a Nintendo's Player's Choice Million Seller title. Ten years later, the N64 version of the game was released on the Wii's Virtual Console. Due to Midway Games' bankruptcy, it was not released on the Wii U Virtual Console, though the game can be played on the Wii U in Wii Mode.

The first sequel to the game Cruis'n World was released for arcades in 1996. The general gameplay remained the same, with different locales. The race now starts in Hawaii and ends in Florida. New to the game was a stunt system, which allowed players to perform stunts and gain time to finish the race. The Nintendo 64 version was developed by Eurocom and originally scheduled for release in fall 1997, but the game was silently delayed until the summer/fall of 1998. It was better received than the port of the original game. In the Nintendo 64 version, most of the levels and tracks are available from the start with additional cars and stages and new paint jobs available as unlockables. There are also new courses and cars only available in the Nintendo 64 version, as well as Rumble Pak support. Progress in the Nintendo 64 version can be saved using up to four accounts on the Game Pak. Again, this version went through some censorship (namely the removal of the ability to kill wildlife). Both the arcade and Nintendo 64 version now allowed for up to four players on the track.

The third and final game in the original arcade series, Cruis'n Exotica was released for arcades at the end of 1999. The game featured twelve new tracks, with the race starting in Hong Kong and ending on Mars. The game retains the stunts feature of the previous game and adds a PIN system by which players can store their in-game history by establishing a personal passcode using the cabinet's keypad. Home versions were released for the Nintendo 64 and Game Boy Color in fall 2000. Gratuitous Games developed the Nintendo 64 version, which replaced some licensed cars from the arcade (e.g. the Chevrolet Corvette (C5), Plymouth Barracuda and Plymouth Prowler) with generic equivalents. The Game Boy Color version was developed by Crawfish Interactive. Both versions feature unlockable tracks and cars. The Nintendo 64 version can again save different accounts while the Game Boy Color version uses a password system. Once again, the Nintendo 64 version was censored to remove the ability to kill wildlife, and both the arcade and Nintendo 64 versions can allow up to four players on the track.

=== Subsequent titles ===
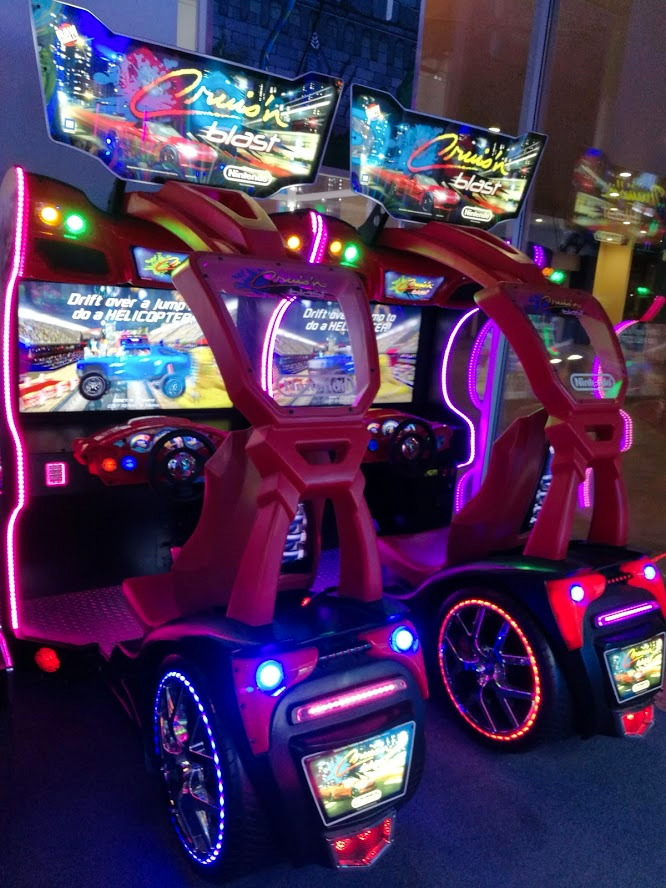
Cruis 'n Blast arcade cabinets

The next game in the series, Cruis'n Velocity, was released exclusively for the Game Boy Advance in 2001. This game was developed by Graphic State and published by Midway. The race takes place in exotic places like Las Vegas, Alaska, Ireland and Mars. The objective of the game is to outrun seven other cars in fourteen different courses by using the new boost system. As in the previous games, the player can unlock new kinds of stages and cars. The game uses the password system to save progress and allows up to four players by using the Game Boy Advance Link Cable.

In 2004, Eugene Jarvis's new company, Raw Thrills, released The Fast and the Furious, an arcade game based on the 2001 film. The game was heavily based on the original Cruis'n games, with players choosing from seven different cars and cruising through twelve different courses. The race starts in New York's Times Square, and ends in Los Angeles's Mulholland Drive. The game features a nitrous system, which gives cars a brief boost of speed. The game also has a money system by which players earn cash to unlock new upgrades. It was later ported to the Wii by Just Games Interactive and released by Midway in 2007 as Cruis'n, which featured none of the original game's The Fast and the Furious branding. The Wii version was heavily criticized for its dated presentation, shallow gameplay and long loading times.

A new entry, Cruis'n Blast (play-tested under beta names Cruis'n Adventure and Cruis'n Redline) was released in January 2017 by Raw Thrills under license from Nintendo, who own the Cruis'n trademarks. The game features five tracks and eight cars, along with eight bonus vehicles. Tracks featured in the game are Death Valley, Madagascar, London, Rio de Janeiro, and Singapore. The cars that are in the game are a Lamborghini Huracán, Lamborghini Countach, Lamborghini Diablo, Lamborghini Veneno, Lamborghini Aventador, Nissan GT-R, Chevrolet Corvette C7, and a Hummer HX. Bonus vehicles consist of a helicopter, a cart, a truck, a London cab colored with the Union Jack flag, a police car, a double-decker bus, a dinosaur, and a dune buggy. A later update featured newer cars that consisted of a 1959 Corvette, a 1963 Corvette Stingray, a 1959 Cadillac Eldorado, a 2019 Chevrolet Camaro ZL1, and a 2019 Nissan 370Z. A port for the Nintendo Switch was released in September 2021.
