= Dark Arena =

2002 video game

- North American cover art
- Developer: Graphic State
- Publisher: Majesco
- Platform: Game Boy Advance
- Release: NA: January 22, 2002; EU: February 15, 2002
- Genre: First-person shooter
- Mode: Single-player

Dark Arena is a first-person shooter video game for the Game Boy Advance. It was the first FPS game announced for the Game Boy Advance, but it was the fourth released. Another Game Boy Advance game, Cruis'n Velocity, used the same game engine.

== Plot ==
Dark Arena has been labeled a Doom clone due to the similar look and play of the game.

The United Arms Organization constructs a top-secret training facility, codenamed Dark Arena, on a small, isolated island on an alien planet. Genetic splicing was performed to create dangerous Genetically Engineered Organisms (GEOs) that were intended to train troops, under the assurance that special security fail-safe systems would prevent the creatures from breaking free. However, in the summer of 2146, the failsafes failed, allowing the GEOs to overrun the facility and slaughter its personnel.

No sooner after this occurs, Angelina Bradshaw and her special operations team are summoned to the island to try and get things back under control, but all of her men are no match for the GEOs, leaving her trapped alone deep in Dark Arena. She manages to hide for a while to recollect herself and inform authorities of the situation before the GEOs finally find her. Unwilling to share the fate of her comrades, she begins to battle her way out of Dark Arena and must race against time to clear out a path to a hangar on the outskirts of the island and evacuate before a nuclear strike is called to destroy all GEOs as a last resort.

The game's ending depends on the difficulty level set by the player. If the player completes the game on the easiest difficulty, Angelina is ambushed and killed at the hangar by enemies that she did not encounter on her way out, who intelligently set a trap for her. On the medium difficulty, she makes it to the hangar and successfully escapes, but not before being threatened by some enemies she didn't fight. If the hard difficulty was completed, she discovers that she has wiped the entire facility clean of monsters, leaving none to stop her at the hangar. Confident in her unparalleled combat skills, she then takes off and plans to investigate a similar disaster occurring on the planet Wolf-354.

== Reception ==
Reception

Aggregate score
Aggregator	Score
Metacritic	65/100

Review scores
Publication	Score
AllGame	2.5/5
Eurogamer	5/10
Game Informer	7/10
GamePro	3/5
GameSpot	6.5/10
GameSpy	69%
GameZone	8/10
IGN	8/10
Nintendo Power	2.8/5
X-Play	2/5

Dark Arena received "mixed or average reviews" according to video game review aggregator Metacritic. The mixed reaction was primarily due to poor enemy AI and uninspired level design, but the game was also praised for having many nice touches often not included in pseudo-3D FPS, such as a sniper rifle with zoom functions and a guided missile. Many people regarded it as a Doom clone, as it had similar gameplay and level designers were recruited from the Doom modding community.
