= Cruis'n Exotica =

1999 video game

- North American arcade flyer
- Developers: Midway Games (Arcade); Gratuitous Games (Nintendo 64); Crawfish Interactive (Game Boy Color)
- Publisher: Midway Games
- Designer: Eugene Jarvis
- Composer: Vince Pontarelli
- Series: Cruis'n
- Platforms: Arcade; Nintendo 64; Game Boy Color
- Release: Arcade: WW: 1999; Nintendo 64: NA: October 17, 2000; Game Boy Color: NA: October 31, 2000
- Genre: Racing
- Modes: Single-player, multiplayer
- Arcade system: Midway Zeus II

Cruis'n Exotica is a 1999 racing game developed and published by Midway Games for arcades. The game is a sequel to Cruis'n World and is the third entry in Nintendo's Cruis'n series. A port to the Nintendo 64 developed by Gratuitous Games was released in 2000, along with a Game Boy Color version developed by Crawfish Interactive.

== Gameplay ==
A player racing on the Hong Kong course (Nintendo 64 version)

Cruis'n Exotica plays similarly to the previous games in the series, but it adds a PIN system to track progress like San Francisco Rush 2049. The levels take place in exotic locations in the universe, such as Las Vegas, Hong Kong, Atlantis, India, Alaska, Amazon with dinosaurs, Sahara, Tibet, Korea, Ireland, Holland and the surface of Mars. The game also allows a player to choose a driver visible onscreen during races.

The Nintendo 64 version is similar to its arcade counterpart, with changes being made to race track layouts, lack of fully licensed vehicles, and more hidden vehicles.

== Reception ==
Reception

Aggregate scores
Aggregator	Score
GameRankings	(N64) 55.87% (GBC) 48%
Metacritic	(N64) 43/100

Review scores
Publication	Score
Electronic Gaming Monthly	6.5/10
GameFan	50%
GameSpot	(N64) 5.8/10 (GBC) 5.4/10
IGN	(N64) 5.7/10 (GBC) 5/10
Nintendo Power	6.7/10

The home ports of the game were met with very mixed reception. GameRankings and Metacritic gave it a score of 55.87% and 43 out of 100 for the Nintendo 64 version, and 48% for the Game Boy Color version.

Electronic Gaming Monthly noted that the Nintendo 64 version "runs smoothly, but suffers from a tremendous level of draw-in. This visual hitch can make it difficult to navigate the road, a problem that becomes particularly potent when racing friends in the multiplayer mode. Another concern is replay value: the first 10 minutes or so really hook you in, but when you get the hang of the control, the challenge disappears, and so does the fun".

Brad Shoemaker of GameSpot wrote about the Nintendo 64 version: "The game's graphics run quite smoothly on a platform that's hardly renowned for smooth graphics. Unfortunately, this smoothness comes at a price - Exotica's cars and tracks lack detail. The game looks decent, but it won't blow your mind". Shoemaker also wrote that the game "requires very little skill or finesse, but for the casual gamer who doesn't want to commit lots of time to racing a track, that's not really a bad thing".

Cory D. Lewis of IGN wrote the Nintendo 64 version featured nearly identical gameplay to its predecessors, saying "that right there spells certain doom for this latest title. Once again we find only a few extra little touches to help differentiate this sequel as something 'new' for gamers". Lewis wrote the game would become boring "unless you are extremely young or easily impressed". Lewis praised the game's framerate, but criticized its graphics, writing: "Yuck. Yuck, yuck, yuck. We have one word to describe these visuals, and you've just heard it four times in a row". Lewis offered some praise for the game's music, but criticized its sound effects, and compared the game to other Midway racing games such as Stunt Racer 64 and San Francisco Rush 2049: "Except that for what each of these games does well, Exotica simply does the complete opposite and truly disappoints in comparison".

Frank Provo of GameSpot wrote that the Game Boy Color version "bears only a passing resemblance to its arcade and console counterparts". Provo criticized the game's artificial intelligence and its limited sounds, including its "bland" engine effects and "tinny rhythm and blues music" and noted the game has "a speedy frame rate and obstacle-filled backgrounds, albeit at the cost of an overall grainy veneer and two-tone vehicle sprites". Provo wrote despite the game's flaws, there "is never any doubt that you're playing a Cruis'n game".

IGN's Craig Harris, who reviewed the Game Boy Color version, wrote that "as impressive as the game engine is, the game is just flat-out bland". Harris criticized the game's artificial intelligence and its Cruis'n Freestyle mode, writing "where's the incentive to play the circuit mode if you can race all the tracks in a separate mode? That's not exactly smart planning. […] the replay factor is destroyed simply by the inclusion of one single mode that really didn't need to be there".
