= Cruis'n World =

1996 video game

- North American arcade flyer
- Developers: Midway Games (arcade); Eurocom (Nintendo 64)
- Publishers: Nintendo; Midway Games (arcade)
- Designer: Eugene Jarvis
- Programmers: Eric Pribyl; Scott Posch
- Artists: Xion Cooper; Ted Barber
- Composer: Vince Pontarelli
- Series: Cruis'n
- Platforms: Arcade; Nintendo 64
- Release: Arcade: WW: November 1996; Nintendo 64: EU: June 25, 1998; NA: September 28, 1998
- Genre: Racing
- Mode: Up to 4 players simultaneously
- Arcade system: Midway V Unit

Cruis'n World is a 1996 racing game developed by Midway Games and published by Nintendo. It is the sequel to the 1994 arcade racer Cruis'n USA. A port for the Nintendo 64 developed by Eurocom was released in 1998, and was the best received of the Cruis'n ports.

Cruis'n World allows players to race on various tracks around the world. The game also features more cars than Cruis'n USA. This game introduced stunts to the Cruis'n series. They served to dodge obstacles, take close curves, and gain extra seconds of time.

== Gameplay ==
Arcade version screenshot depicting the Australia stage

Cruis'n World has the same core gameplay as its predecessor, in that the player races on different tracks under a time limit to reach the goal, passing checkpoints along the way to help extend this time limit. The races take place in different destinations around the world, opening in Hawaii, then progressing to Japan, Australia, China, Kenya, Egypt, Moscow, Germany, Italy, France, England, Mexico, and New York City before concluding in Florida. The cars now have the ability to perform stunts during races such as wheelies, that give short speed bursts, and aerial flips, which deduct seconds from the final race time, allowing for the player to achieve a better position in the records' table. Should the player go through all stages including Florida, their car would be taken by a Space Shuttle for a trip to the moon, where they would be congratulated by then-U.S. President Bill Clinton.

The Nintendo 64 version adds an extra track on the Moon, which is unlocked once the player reaches the end of the "Cruise the World" mode. It also features an exclusive Championship mode, in which players race on circuit tracks set in the game's different stages rather than the arcade's road tracks, competing for points that allow the player to unlock upgrades for the cars. The game supports up to four players using a split screen.

== Development ==
The developers of this game sent artists on a round-the-world trip to digitally capture sights and major tourist attractions.

The development of the Nintendo 64 version started in 1996 after the development of the Nintendo 64 version of Cruis'n USA. Eugene Jarvis had admitted that Williams Entertainment's port of Cruis'n USA was not good, so they promised the game to be an arcade perfect port. Eurocom took the Cruis'n license and decided to spend more time on the game than in Cruis'n USA. In early 1997, Nintendo announced Cruis'n World would be coming to the Nintendo 64 in the fall. However, the game was silently delayed until 1998.

== Reception ==
Reception

Aggregate score
Aggregator	Score	
Aggregator	Arcade	N64
GameRankings	N/A	63%

Review scores
Publication	Score	
Publication	Arcade	N64
AllGame	4.5/5	3/5
Computer and Video Games	N/A	1/5
Electronic Gaming Monthly	N/A	6.37/10
GamePro	N/A	2.5/5
GameRevolution	N/A	B−
GameSpot	N/A	5.9/10
IGN	N/A	6.5/10
N64 Magazine	N/A	38%
Next Generation	3/5	2/5
Nintendo Power	N/A	7.7/10
The Cincinnati Enquirer	N/A	3.5/5

The game was displayed at the 1996 AMOA show, where it won the award for Most Innovative New Title. Electronic Gaming Monthly named it a runner-up for Arcade Game of the Year. A Next Generation critic commented that, like Cruis'n USA, Cruis'n World has an unsurpassed sense of arcade-style driving, saying the players can drive fast, knock the cars off the road and get into chaotic multi-car collisions. At the same time, he found this a shortcoming, since the game is very quickly mastered. He praised the track design as being more elaborate and requiring more skill than its predecessor, but said the pop-in remains as bad as before.

The Nintendo 64 port was met with mixed reception. On review aggregation site GameRankings, it held a score of 63% based on 14 reviews.

Next Generation reviewed the Nintendo 64 version of the game, rating it two stars out of five, criticising the game having minimal technique and difficulty.
