= John Krsteski =

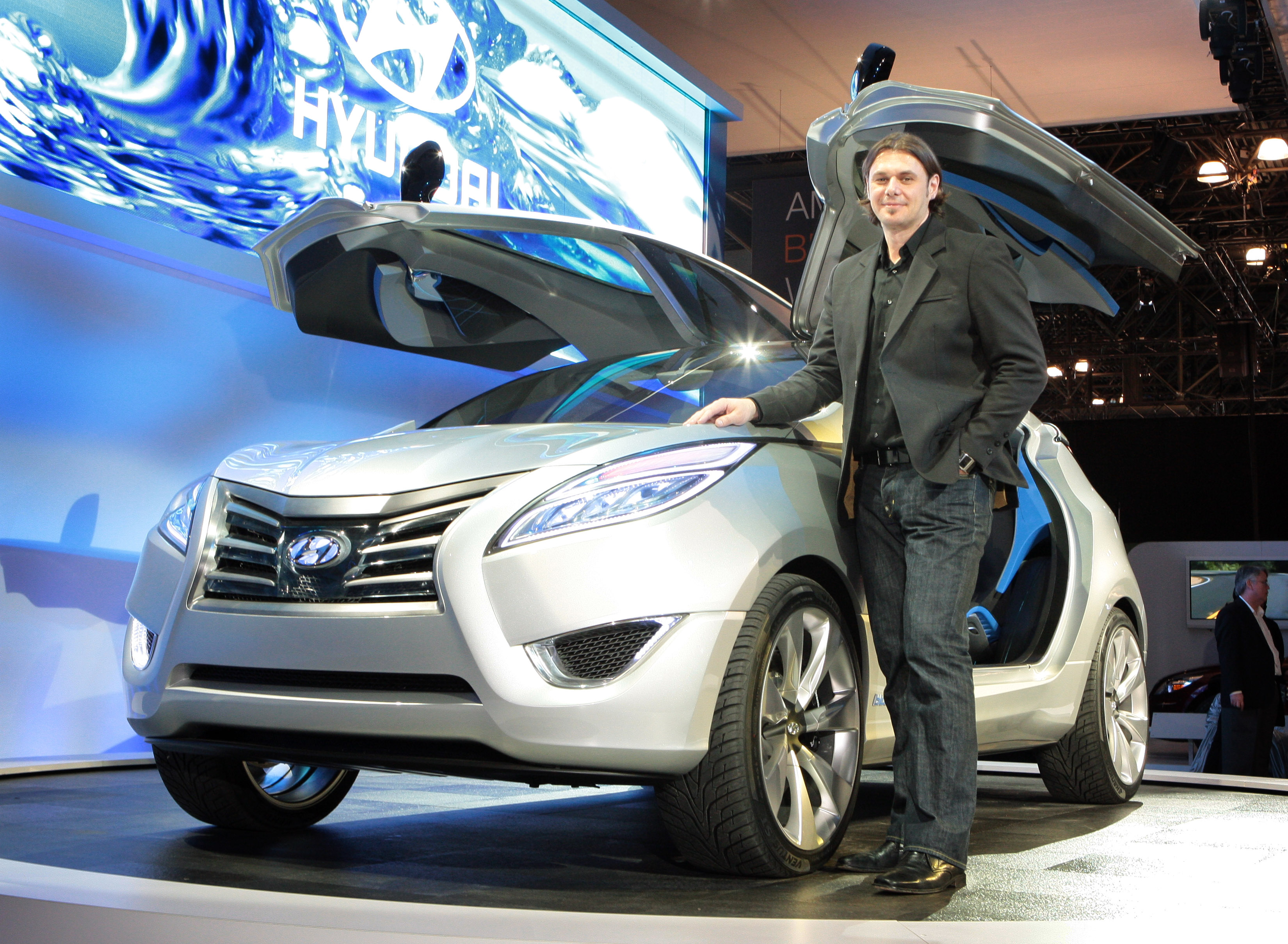
- Born: Macedonia
- Citizenship: United States of America
- Education: College for Creative Studies
- Occupation: Car Designer
- Organization: Genesis Motor
- Title: Senior Chief Designer

John Krsteski is an American automobile designer, automotive artist, painter and Chief Designer at Genesis, North America. Born in Macedonia, he moved to Detroit, Michigan when he was a child. He went on to study transportation design at the College for Creative Studies in Detroit. While at CCS, Krsteski elected also to study painting.

On graduation, he joined Johnson controls where he worked on advanced automotive interiors at a time when the expectation for design graduates was to become exterior designers. He described going into interior design as "An unusual step of focusing on his weakness",

"Coming out of school, I wasn’t too good at interiors," he says. "At that time, students weren’t being trained for interiors, because the expectation was that you’d be an exterior designer. I had an opportunity with (supplier) Johnson Controls to do interiors. I thought it was fantastic. I could go there and learn more about the inside of the car."

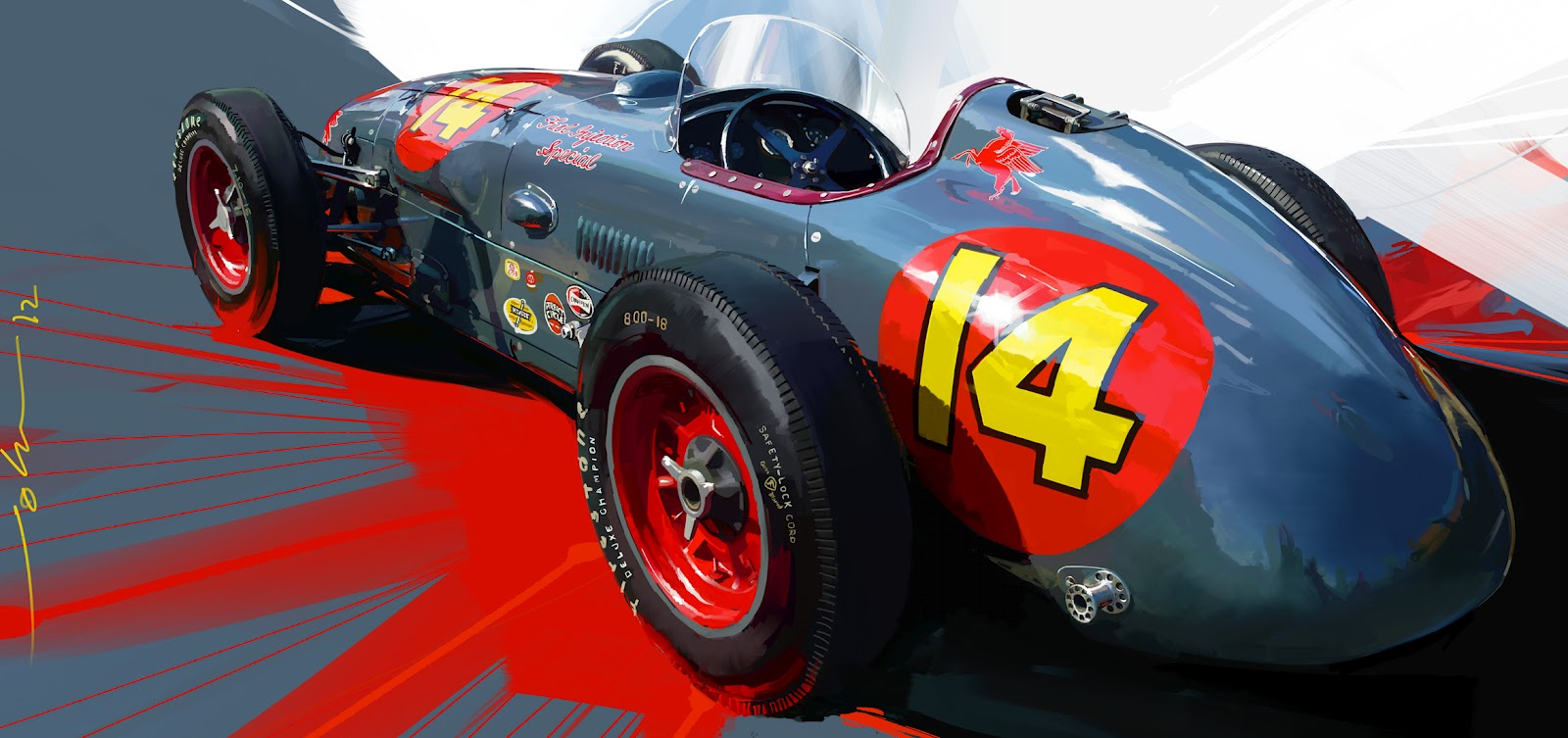
John Krsteski automotive art

Krsteski worked at Johnson controls for three years where he became a design manager. He joined Hyundai Motor America in 2007 as a design manager, remained there for 13 years, and joined joining Genesis Design, as a chief designer. He started out with interiors and later transitioned to exterior design. During Krsteski's time at Hyundai, he was responsible for several concept and production vehicles, such as the Hyundai Nuvis concept, Curb Concept, HCD-14 concept, Hyundai Sonata, and Hyundai Genesis. He appeared on the MotoMan TV in 2011 in a mini documentary series about the design and development of the Hyundai Curb concept.

Krsteski is also an instructor at the ArtCenter College of Design in Pasadena, where he teaches automobile design.
