= Cruis'n USA =

1994 video game

- North American Nintendo 64 cover art featuring the Itali P69 (Ferrari 512 TR, foreground), the Devastator VI (Hyundai HCD-II Epoch, background), and the All Terrain Vehicle (Jeep Wrangler, background)
- Developers: TV Games Inc. (arcade); Leland Interactive Media (Nintendo 64) (Note: The company is credited as its parent company Williams Entertainment.)
- Publishers: Nintendo; Midway Games (arcade)
- Director: Eugene Jarvis
- Programmers: Eric Pribyl; Carl Mey
- Artists: Xion Cooper; Ted Barber
- Composer: Vince Pontarelli
- Series: Cruis'n
- Platforms: Arcade, Nintendo 64
- Release: Arcade; WW: October 1994; Nintendo 64; NA: December 2, 1996; EU: February 1998
- Genre: Racing
- Modes: Single-player, multiplayer
- Arcade system: Midway V Unit

Cruis'n USA is a racing video game developed by TV Games Inc. and published by Nintendo. It was first released in arcades in 1994 by Midway Games, with a port to the Nintendo 64 developed by Leland Interactive Media released in 1996. It is the first game in the Cruis'n series, and features races set in locations across the Continental United States.

Cruis'n USA is branded as the first release of the "Ultra 64" platform collaboration between Midway and Nintendo, although it was based on the Midway V-unit arcade hardware; again, the unit was different from the Killer Instinct arcade hardware, which also shared no lineage with the Nintendo 64. The home port was published by Nintendo as part of the deal.

The arcade version was critically and commercially successful, drawing favorable comparisons to Sega's Daytona USA. The Nintendo 64 version received poor reviews but was also commercially successful. It was released on Wii's Virtual Console in Europe on March 28, 2008, making it the first third party developed Nintendo 64 game to be released on the service. It became available on the Virtual Console in North America on March 31, 2008.

== Gameplay ==
Arcade version screenshot featuring the Itali P69 (Ferrari 512 TR) in a race in 9th place in Chicago, Illinois, USA

Like in most racing games, players race down one-way courses consisting of streets vaguely based on real-life locations. While racing, they do their best to avoid various road hazards such as oncoming traffic and construction. Players chose between seven different cars, with either an automatic or manual transmission. The race begins in San Francisco and moves across California, progressing to Arizona, the Grand Canyon, Iowa, Chicago, Indiana, and Appalachia before concluding in Washington, D.C. If the player were to complete all tracks, they would be congratulated by then-U.S. President Bill Clinton.

In each race, players must reach first place to advance to the next track, and there is a time limit to reach the goal, which can be extended by driving through checkpoints. If the player does not finish before the timer reaches zero, the game ends, unless there is a continue available. Unlike most racing games, there is the option to change the music by pressing the music button.

== Vehicles ==
The four vehicles featured in the game are generic vehicles based on their real life counter parts which consists of a 1963 Chevrolet Corvette labeled as a 1963 Muscle Car, a 1991 Ferrari 512 TR labeled as the Italia P69, a 1940 Ford V-8 De Luxe labeled as "La Bomba", and a Hyundai HCD-II Epoch labeled as "Devastator IV". Bonus cars consist of a 1991 Chevrolet Caprice police car, a school bus, and a Jeep Wrangler labeled as an All Terrain Vehicle.

== Development ==
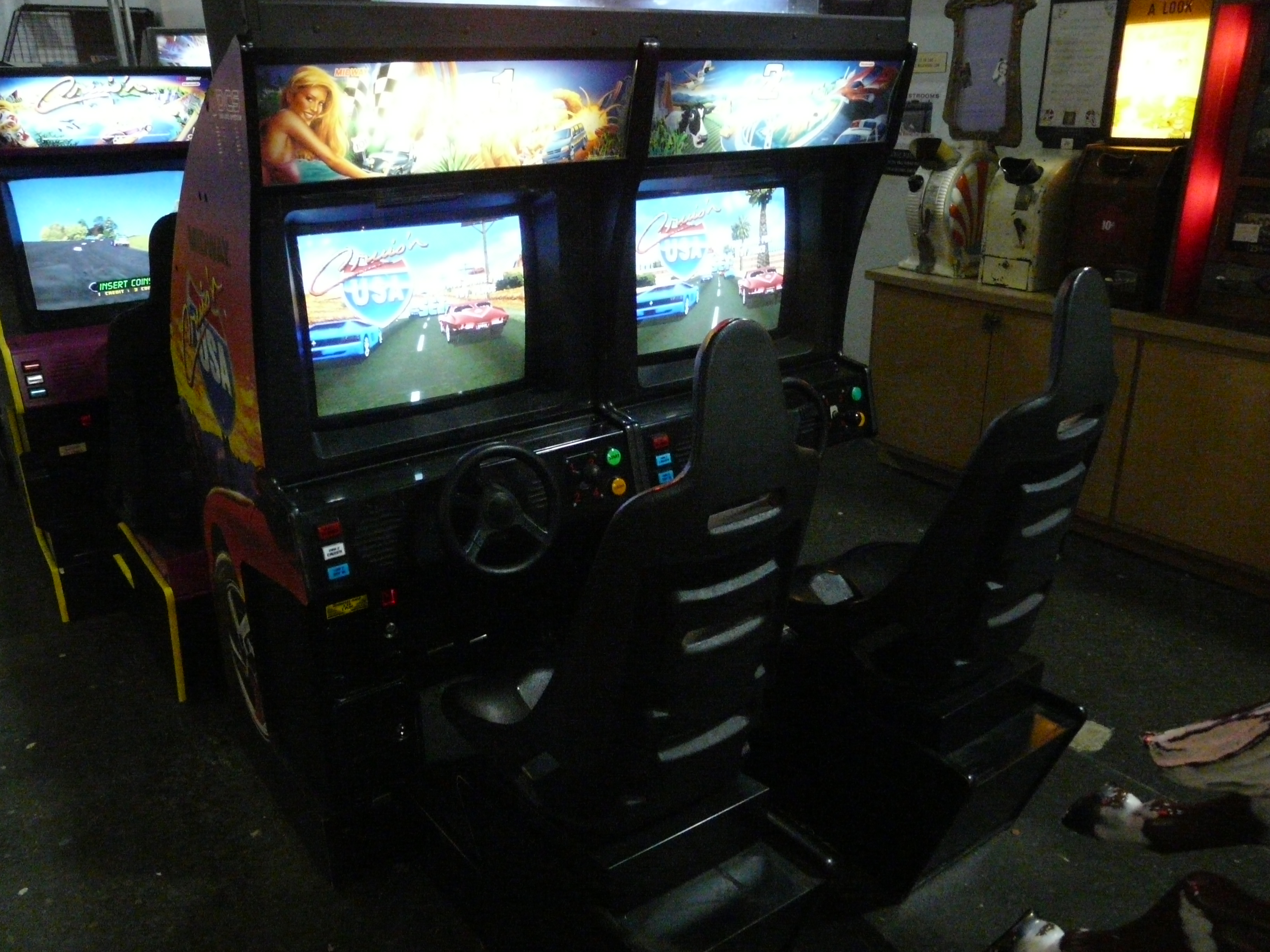
Arcade version

In early 1994, Nintendo signed a licensing agreement with WMS Industries, Midway's parent company, which allowed Midway to release two arcade games advertised as the first version of Ultra 64 hardware and formed a joint venture named "Williams/Nintendo" to port those two games to its consoles. Nintendo wanted an arcade racing game to compete against Sega's racing game Daytona USA and Namco's Ridge Racer, both of which were successful at the time. Eugene Jarvis, who had developed Defender (1981) and Robotron: 2084 (1982) for Williams Electronics, served as lead developer. Jarvis pitched a racing game concept to Williams and Nintendo. Along with Killer Instinct, created by Rare, the arcade original was showcased at the June 1994 Consumer Electronics Show as running on Ultra 64 branded arcade hardware, sharing the branding of Nintendo's upcoming home console, codenamed Ultra 64. A few months later, Nintendo of America chairman Howard Lincoln admitted that Cruisin' USA was actually programmed before the MIPS CPU based console version of Ultra 64 development tools were available from Silicon Graphics, and that even at this point Rare was the only development company to have access to these development tools. The Cruis'n USA cabinet shown at the Consumer Electronics Show was actually running on a modified JAMMA board. Cruis'n USA runs on a Midway V-Unit, which is very different from what would become the Silicon Graphics based Nintendo 64. The Midway V-unit consists of a 50 MHz TMS32031 CPU, a 10 MHz ADSP-2115 DSP for sound, and a custom 3D chip that can render perspective-correct but unfiltered quads at a high resolution (512 × 400 pixels).

The San Diego division of Williams Entertainment, Leland Interactive Media, the developers of the Nintendo 64 version, had to downgrade most of the arcade graphics to accommodate home console hardware. Originally announced as a Nintendo 64 launch game along with Killer Instinct Gold, less than a month before launch day it was pulled from the lineup and returned to Williams for retooling because it did not meet Nintendo's quality standards. Several elements of the game, such as the ability to run over animals and depictions of Bill and Hillary Clinton in a hot tub, were censored from the Nintendo 64 version. During the last couple of months of development, people sent letters or emails about the censorship. Jarvis also publicly objected to it: "It seems like they don't have a sense of humor. I don't know what's wrong with these people."

== Reception ==
Reception

Aggregate score
Aggregator	Score
GameRankings	(N64) 51%

Review scores
Publication	Score
AllGame	(ARC) 3/5 (N64) 2/5
Edge	4/10
Electronic Gaming Monthly	(N64) 5.25/10
Eurogamer	5/10
Game Informer	7.75/10
GameRevolution	C−
GameSpot	(N64) 6.1/10
IGN	(N64) 4/10
N64 Magazine	24%
Next Generation	(Arcade) 5/5 (N64) 1/5
Nintendo Life	(N64) 3/10
Nintendo Power	3.13/5

The arcade version of Cruis'n USA was critically and commercially successful. In the United States, RePlay reported Cruis'n USA to be the second most-popular deluxe arcade game in November 1994, and Play Meter listed the title to be the second most-popular arcade game in December 1994. It was one of America's top five best-selling arcade video games of 1994, receiving a Diamond Award from the American Amusement Machine Association (AMAA). It went on to be America's highest-grossing dedicated arcade cabinet of 1995.

Next Generation reviewed the arcade version of the game; while viewing the game as graphically less impressive than its rivals, they praised other aspects that could rival games like Out Run from Sega.

The Nintendo 64 version met with mixed reviews, and earned a GameRankings score of 50.63% based on 16 reviews. Reviews widely criticized the jerky frame rate, poor collision detection, and music, which they said to be both stylistically inappropriate and poorly composed. Next Generation concluded that "this half-hearted, rough-shod conversion is exactly what Nintendo 64 doesn't need". GameSpot's Jeff Gerstmann and GamePro's Air Hendrix had more mixed reactions than most. Gerstmann praised the controls when using the Nintendo 64 controller's analog stick, but concluded the game to be a major disappointment. Air Hendrix, while heavily criticizing elements like the pop-up in the two-player mode and lack of variety in general, said it is essentially a faithful conversion of the arcade game and worth trying out as a rental, though not an outright purchase. Peer Schneider of IGN and Kraig Kujawa of Electronic Gaming Monthly both said the two-player split-screen mode is the highlight of the game, while noting that the frame rate problems are even worse in this mode. Kujawa's co-reviewer Dean Hager said the game "certainly fails to show off the processing power of the N64", and Shneider said it lacked excitement and was "probably doomed to be the nadir of N64 racing games for many years to come."

Despite the negative reviews, the Nintendo 64 version of Cruis'n USA saw strong sales, thanks largely to a combination of the console's popularity and the small library of games available for it at the time. It was the sixth best-selling video game of the 1996 Christmas shopping season according to TRST data, with three of the five higher-selling games also being Nintendo 64 games. By the end of 1997 it had sold over a million copies. In 1995, Flux magazine ranked the arcade version 63rd on its "Top 100 Video Games."

Reviewing the Virtual Console release in Nintendo Life, Damien McFerran echoed many of the original criticisms about jerky frame rate, poor collision detection, and lack of speed and excitement, and said that even the arcade original is a fairly poor game.
