= Williams Pinball Classics =

Williams Pinball Classics may refer to:

- Pinball Hall of Fame: The Williams Collection (2007), a pinball video game released by System 3 with this title in PAL territories in 2011
- Williams Pinball Classics (2001), a pinball video game by Encore, Inc. for Windows
