= Pinball Hall of Fame: The Williams Collection =

2008 video game

- North American Wii cover art
- Developer: FarSight Studios
- Publishers: NA: Crave Entertainment; EU: System 3
- Platforms: Nintendo 3DS; PlayStation 2 PlayStation 3 PlayStation Portable; Wii; Xbox 360
- Release: PlayStation 2, PlayStation Portable, Wii: NA: February 26, 2008; Xbox 360, PlayStation 3: NA: September 22, 2009; Nintendo 3DS: NA: September 23, 2011
- Genre: Pinball
- Modes: Single-player, multiplayer

Pinball Hall of Fame: The Williams Collection is a pinball video game developed by FarSight Studios and published by Crave Entertainment for Wii, PlayStation 2, PlayStation 3, PlayStation Portable, Xbox 360, and Nintendo 3DS. Players play on a variety of classic virtual pinball machines from Williams Electronics' history. The Williams Collection follows the previous title, Pinball Hall of Fame: The Gottlieb Collection.

The game was released by System 3 in PAL territories on June 17, 2011 as Williams Pinball Classics. This title should not be confused with Williams Pinball Classics (2001) by Encore, Inc. that features four machines (Creature from the Black Lagoon, Tales of the Arabian Nights, Black Rose and Lost World) for Windows.

== Gameplay ==
All machines are available at the start of play, but some require players to use credits. The player begins the game with 20 credits and earn more by obtaining specials and accomplishing various goals on each machine. For 100 credits, players can buy any of the locked machines for free-play mode. Completing the five goals for any machines also allows players to unlock a locked machine.

Other unlockable options include additional skins for the pinball, the option to play a left-to-right inverted (Mirror Mode) version of the game, and removal of tilt detection. Flipper control remains intuitive in Mirror Mode, with the left trigger controlling the left on-screen flipper. Side-specific features of some games, such as Lane Change, move to the opposite side of the machine.

In the Wii version of the game, the player uses the trigger buttons of the Wii Remote and Nunchuk to activate the flippers. The machine can be bumped or shifted with the motion sensors in either the Remote or Nunchuck. The resulting motion is proportional in magnitude and identical in direction to the controller's motion. This allows skilled players to use just enough motion to perform advanced ball saves without triggering the tilt mechanism, just as can be done on a physical machine.

Detailed in-game instructions are included for each machine.

== Machines ==
Table	Year	Platform(s)			
Table	Year	Wii and PSP	PS3 and 360	PS2	3DS
Black Knight	1980	Yes	Yes	Yes	Yes
FunHouse	1990	Yes	Yes	Yes	Yes
Gorgar	1979	Yes	Yes	Yes	Yes
PIN•BOT	1986	Yes	Yes	Yes	Yes
Space Shuttle	1984	Yes	Yes	Yes	Yes
Taxi	1988	Yes	Yes	Yes	Yes
Whirlwind	1990	Yes	Yes	Yes	Yes
Firepower	1980	Yes	Yes	Yes	No
Jive Time	1970	Yes	Yes (Note: Unlockable.)	No	No
Sorcerer	1985	Yes	Yes	No	No
Tales of the Arabian Nights	1996	No	Yes (Note: Uses a dot-matrix display.)	No	No
Medieval Madness	1997	No	Yes	No	No
No Good Gofers	1997	No	Yes	No	No

== Reception ==
Reception

Aggregate score
Aggregator	Score					
Aggregator	3DS	PS2	PS3	PSP	Wii	Xbox 360
Metacritic	67/100	72/100	82/100	78/100	82/100	83/100

Review scores
Publication	Score					
Publication	3DS	PS2	PS3	PSP	Wii	Xbox 360
GameSpot	N/A	N/A	8/10	8/10	N/A	N/A
GamesRadar+	N/A	N/A	4/5	N/A	3.5/5	4/5
IGN	N/A	N/A	8.5/10	N/A	8/10	8.5/10
Nintendo Life	7/10	N/A	N/A	N/A	N/A	N/A
Nintendo World Report	N/A	N/A	N/A	N/A	8.5/10	N/A

Pinball Hall of Fame: The Williams Collection received "positive" and "mixed or averages" reviews, according to review aggregator Metacritic. The Wii version was nominated for Best Graphics Technology for the Wii by IGN in its 2008 video game awards, while the PSP version was nominated for best PSP game of 2008 by GameSpot. Gamasutra named The Williams Collection the third most overlooked game of 2008.

== Soundtrack ==
The soundtrack of this game features the following songs:

- "Full Throttle" — Eric Barnett
- "Premonition" — Chris Kline
- "Let Go" — Brett Rakestraw
- "Flipper Frenzy" — Jeremy Fannon
- "Maelstrom" — Don Madison
- "Depeche" — Nelson Everhart
- "Blast Off" — Damien Harrison
- "The Weezered" — Jim Watson
- "Arcade Jam" — Chris Kline
- "Oracle" — Chris Kline
- "Pinball Dreams" — Chris Kline
- "In the Groove" — Chris Kline

== See also ==
- Pinball Hall of Fame
- Pinball Hall of Fame: The Gottlieb Collection
- The Pinball Arcade
