= Jive Time =

1970 pinball machine

- Manufacturer: Williams
- Release date: April 1970
- Design: Norm Clark
- Artwork: Christian Marche
- Production run: 2,100

Jive Time is a pinball machine designed by Norm Clark and released in April 1970 by Williams Electronics. A version of this table with an add-a-ball feature, called Rock 'n Roll was released in the same month.

== Layout ==
The game has two up-posts, one between the flippers, and the other near the right outlane. The playfield includes two eject holes, and five jet bumpers.

== Gameplay ==
The game can be set for play with 3 or 5 balls. If the player lands the ball in one of the eject holes, the large spinner on the backglass spins and awards the player the score or bonus that the arrow stops on.

== Digital versions ==
Jive Time released for various platforms in Pinball Hall of Fame: The Williams Collection between 2008 and 2009.
