= The Shadow (pinball) =

1994 pinball machine

- Manufacturer: Midway
- Release date: November 1994
- System: Midway WPC-Security
- Design: Brian Eddy
- Programming: Brian Eddy, Mike Boon
- Artwork: Doug Watson
- Mechanics: Robert C. Friesl, Edison Oñate
- Music: Dan Forden
- Sound: Dan Forden
- Voices: Tim Kitzrow (The Shadow / Lamont Cranston); Penelope Ann Miller (Margo Lane); John Lone (Shiwan Khan); Tim Curry (Farley Claymore)
- Production run: 4,247

The Shadow is a 1994 pinball game designed by Brian Eddy and released by Midway (under the Bally label). It is based on the 1994 movie of the same name.

== Description ==
This game featured new speech by Penelope Ann Miller (Margo Lane), John Lone (Shiwan Khan), and Tim Curry (Farley Claymore) (reprising their respective roles), as well as speech from the movie. The Shadow's speech for this game was provided by Williams/Midway voice actor, Tim Kitzrow.

Doug Watson chatted with the director of the film, Russell Mulcahy, for several hours on a research trip to Hollywood.

The game's noted features include player-controlled ball diverters on the left and right ramps, a magnetic ball lock (which freezes the ball and pulls the ball inside the ball lock for Shadow Multiball), and a Breakout-style upper playfield, called "The Battlefield".

== Gameplay ==
The goal is to complete the following tasks to engage in a Final Battle with Shiwan Khan, the game's antagonist:

- Complete Scenes: Complete the following scenes:
  - Punish The Guilty
  - Farley Claymore
  - Duel Of Wills (video mode)
  - The Beryllium Sphere
  - Escape Underwater Doom
  - Discover Hotel Monolith
- Conquer Battle Field:
- Shadow Multiball
- Khan Multiball

== Reception ==
Play Meter said that Bally successfully "transferred the movie experience to the playfield".

A review for The Flipside found the game to offer a variety of ways to score, with a good range of shots enhanced by animations on the display and the music. It also found the table to remain challenging after a large number of games.
