= Stranglehold (video game) =

2007 video game

- Developers: Midway Studios Chicago; Tiger Hill Entertainment
- Publisher: Midway Games
- Director: Brian Eddy
- Producers: John Woo; Terence Chang
- Designer: Neill Glancy
- Programmer: Steve Ellmore
- Artist: Jason Kaehler
- Writer: Tony Peterson
- Composers: Jim Bonney; Sascha Dikiciyan; Cris Velasco; Jamie Christopherson
- Engine: Unreal Engine 3
- Platforms: Xbox 360; Windows; PlayStation 3
- Release: Xbox 360: NA: September 5, 2007; EU: September 14, 2007; AU: September 20, 2007; Windows: NA: September 18, 2007; AU: September 27, 2007; EU: September 28, 2007; PlayStation 3: NA/AU: October 29, 2007; EU: October 30, 2007
- Genre: Third-person shooter
- Modes: Single-player, multiplayer

Stranglehold is a third-person shooter video game developed by Midway Studios Chicago and Tiger Hill Entertainment and published by Midway Games. It was released for the Xbox 360 and Microsoft Windows in September 2007, with a PlayStation 3 release a month later.

Stranglehold is a sequel to John Woo's action film Hard Boiled (1992) and stars Chow Yun-fat reprising his role from the film. It is Midway's first game to use Unreal Engine 3. The game received generally positive reviews from critics and sold more than 1 million units worldwide. A sequel called Gun Runner was in the works prior to Midway's financial demise, but was ultimately cancelled.

== Plot ==
Three triad groups fight for territory in Hong Kong: Dragon Claw, the Imperial 9s (I9s) based in Tai O, and Golden Kane. After a police officer goes missing, the Hong Kong Police Force receives a ransom call. Disobeying orders from police chief Lee, inspector Tequila Yuen heads to a Kowloon market alone to save the officer, but finds evidence that the officer is dead. Tequila's search leads him to a teahouse, where he unintentionally interrupts a business deal between Golden Kane and I9 members. Following a tip that the I9s killed the officer and that the gang is working under Dragon Claw, Tequila heads to Tai O to investigate further.

Tequila tracks down Dragon Claw leader Jimmy Wong, with whom he has a complicated history; he previously dated Jimmy's daughter Billie, and the two have a daughter together named Teko. At Jimmy's side are his henchmen Dapang and Jerry, the latter being an undercover officer who was once Tequila's police partner. Jimmy reveals that the murdered policeman's death is part of a larger plot by Golden Kane to gain more control of Hong Kong, and that the Golden Kane pinned his death on the I9s to divert police attention. They also partnered with the Zakarovs, a Chicago-based Ukrainian mafia family, to kidnap and hold Billie and Teko ransom in exchange for part of Jimmy's territory. When Golden Kane members attack Dragon Claw's Tai O base, Tequila promises Jimmy that he will find his family and helps Jimmy escape.

Tequila eavesdrops on Golden Kane leader Yung Gi's conversation with Damon and Vladimir Zakarov. Impressed by the Zakarovs' philanthropy and social standing, Yung heads to Chicago to see how the Ukrainians run their organization and to facilitate ransom negotiations. Tequila and Jerry travel to the Zakarovs' penthouse in Chicago, splitting up to cover different floors, but are spotted by Vladimir. Tequila works his way to the top floor; after a fight with Vladimir, he causes Vladimir to blow himself up with his own rocket launcher. He then tends to a wounded Jerry.

Tequila finds Damon and Yung at the Chicago History Museum, where they are negotiating the exchange of Billie and Teko. The gangsters agree to let Yung take Teko back to Hong Kong and let Damon bring Billie. Yung leaves with Teko while Tequila kills Damon. Tequila reunites with Billie but is ambushed by Jerry, who kills her. After confirming that Jimmy paid Jerry to murder Billie, Tequila kills Jerry and takes his cell phone. A video on the phone reveals Jimmy's motives: to prevent the Zakarovs from executing Teko, Billie will leak the names of several Dragon Claw associates in court and get Jimmy convicted if he does not agree to the Zakarovs' demands. Tequila texts Jimmy with Jerry's cell phone, claiming to be Jerry and that Tequila is dead as planned.

Back in Hong Kong, Tequila confronts Yung in his office to strike a deal. Yung refuses to let Teko go, so Tequila shows him text messages between Jimmy and Jerry that prove Dragon Claw will betray him during the exchange. The two agree to a new plan: if Tequila kills Jimmy during the deal, then Yung will free Teko. However, after a fight with Dragon Claw members, Tequila shows up late to the new meeting location. Jimmy escapes with Teko while Yung, Tequila, and Dapang are locked in a standoff. As Tequila breaks the standoff by chasing him, Dapang guns Yung down and escapes.

Tequila hijacks a car and chases Jimmy to his estate. After he shoots down one of Jimmy's helicopters, it crashes through the front door of Jimmy's stronghold. Tequila enters the estate to find that Jimmy and Dapang have taken Teko hostage. After a tense standoff, Jimmy agrees to let Teko go in exchange for her and Tequila leaving Hong Kong forever. As she is being freed, Teko warns Tequila that this is a trap, and Jimmy shoots her in the arm before running away. Tequila kills Dapang and searches for Jimmy, who attempts to kill him from afar with a sniper rifle, but Teko sneaks up on him and pushes him over the balcony to his death.

Lee arrives on the scene and returns Tequila's badge to him before Tequila and Teko leave together.

== Gameplay ==
Stranglehold attempts to translate the "gun ballet" aesthetic popularized by director John Woo in films such as Hard Boiled and The Killer into an interactive media format. Although the game has drawn comparisons to Max Payne, which was influenced by Woo's films, a more accurate account of both games' creative provenances traces them to Woo's lengthy shootouts.

Stranglehold is a third-person shooter game. Players control Tequila as he fights various gangsters throughout Hong Kong and Chicago. Players can traverse each level by walking, diving, and taking cover behind walls. Weapons are available such as pistols, submachine guns, shotguns, assault rifles, rocket launchers, heavy machine guns, and grenades. Jumping in any direction or interacting with any object while aiming at an opponent (or pressing a certain button) will slow down time, creating a short window during which Tequila can shoot at targets. This technique, called Tequila Time in the game, generates a cinematic effect that mimics Woo's films. Tequila Time is managed through a meter which drains with use and regenerates with time. Tequila can also make use of his environment, moving up and down railings, swinging from chandeliers, sliding across tabletops, and riding on carts while shooting at enemies.

Another form of gameplay comes from the style and grace associated with Woo's balletic firefights. By taking out enemies, the player earns stars. The more stylish the kills performed, the more stars received. Taking out enemies in quick succession, or interacting with the environment when taking down opponents, will earn the player the optimum number of stars. As an incentive to interact with the environment, Tequila receives a bonus to his attack power and defense during interactions. Tequila also employs several iconic techniques from Woo's movies, referred to as Tequila Bombs. These require energy to perform. The player gains energy by defeating enemies (equal to the stars obtained) and by collecting paper cranes hidden about each level.

== Development ==
Stranglehold was developed by Midway Games and John Woo's Tiger Hill Entertainment. Following the release of 2004's Psi-Ops: The Mindgate Conspiracy, Midway was looking to make a new game based on an existing brand license. Mike Bilder, the studio head, explained that they were trying to establish a competitive advantage by establishing new intellectual properties and said Midway was "trying not to just rest on laurels and become a sequel house". Due to a Midway employee's connections, the company was able to get in touch with John Woo about a possible video game collaboration. Woo himself had co-founded Tiger Hill Entertainment in May 2003, and through his collaboration with Midway, Stranglehold was to be his studio's first video game title. It was also intended to be Midway's first step into developing for the seventh generation of video game consoles; the company wanted to release the game for the PlayStation 3 and Xbox 360. After Woo verbally agreed to a deal, Midway began working on the game in the summer of 2004, and the project was first announced in May 2005.

The development team for Stranglehold, led by game director Brian Eddy, was the same one that worked on Psi-Ops. This was initially a group of 30 people, that ultimately grew to 50 over the course of the game's development. Eddy states that the team's goal was to make the player feel as if they were the one directing the action in a John Woo film. To prepare for the project, the developers watched many of Woo's films, such as Hard Boiled and The Killer, to figure out how to emulate Woo's style of film making. According to Eddy, this research resulted in the team focusing on making player movement feel smooth and fluid, and building in-game environments that were destructible.

In order to bring this vision to life for next-generation consoles, the studio licensed Unreal Engine 3. However, Unreal Engine 3 was still actively in development at the time, and was missing features that the team needed. In order to prototype Stranglehold's gameplay, Midway used their existing engine from Psi-Ops to make a prototype version of the first level, with most of the player's mechanics present in the final game. Once the gameplay had been prototyped, the development team began porting their work over to Unreal Engine, modifying its source code to build in the missing systems. According to Eddy, the team first started customizing the game engine in early 2005, adding the Havok physics engine and other tools throughout development. Among these modifications was Massive Destruction (also known as Massive D), a set of physics technologies that allowed players to destroy nearly every object in a given level. Stranglehold also incorporated a body swapping technique that randomized parts of enemy character models, producing varied characters rather than repetitious clones. For realism, the development team incorporated location-based damage, where the AI responded in different ways to different hit locations. This allowed the team to vary enemy reactions with damage-mapped impact points. This feature was integrated throughout the game, but especially apparent during the second of four Tequila Bombs: Precision Aim. Also, while targets took time to recover from flesh wounds, they will eventually revive (even if unable to stand) and continue to fire until passing out from simulated blood loss.

For the visual direction, art director Jason Kaehler worked with Stephan Martinière, the game's creative visual director, to create concept art in pre-production that was reminiscent of the movies the team watched in their research. The environments that were eventually used in the game came from the thematic goal of creating a fusion of Western and Eastern elements that was present in Woo's films. In-game levels were first sketched out and iterated on using Unreal Tournament 2004.

Throughout development, the team at Midway worked closely with Woo and Tiger Hill Entertainment. While Midway focused on game development, Tiger Hill primarily worked on the story and the storyboards. Woo liked the developers' approach to the game, giving them plenty of freedom throughout the development process. As recalled by Eddy and Kaehler, the film director stepped in a couple of times to steer its direction: once to object to a potential story idea involving the export of body parts, and once to suggest that enemy designs should have more Western clothing. According to Eddy, Woo "made us understand that he prefers poetic violence over gore-fests", which helped the development team retain their focus on the director's vision. Additionally, there were sections of the game that had to be cut due to time constraints. Driving and boating scenes that were initially planned for the single-player campaign were not implemented, and the team had to stop iterating on the game's multiplayer mode in order to make the deadline. According to producer John Vignocchi, the addition of a multiplayer mode was a mandatory requirement by Midway executives.

The developers also worked with Chow Yun-fat throughout the process, as the actor reprised his role from Hard Boiled. To capture his likeness, Midway met with Chow in Hong Kong to digitally scan his face and body, as well as have him record voice lines. Chow also let the team take several photographs of his different facial expressions, so that Midway's animation team could animate cutscenes featuring Tequila better.

Due to Midway's February 2006 partnership with in-game advertising agency Double Fusion, Stranglehold contains dynamic in-game advertising, such as posters and billboards for real world products appearing during gameplay.

A trailer for Stranglehold was present as an extra feature in Mortal Kombat: Armageddon.

As part of the game's promotions, a contest for amateur filmmakers to make the best John Woo-inspired short film was held from April 30 to June 25, 2007. The winner of the "True to Woo" contest received US$25,000, the chance to meet the developers at Midway Chicago, their film's premiere on Spike TV, an Amp'd Mobile phone plan, a Hard Boiled poster autographed by Woo, and a copy of Stranglehold.

According to European marketing director Martin Spiess, Stranglehold cost around US$30,000,000 to produce.

== Release ==
Midway released a Collector's Edition for the console versions of the game. The PlayStation 3 Collector's Edition includes Hard Boiled fully remastered in HD and on the same Blu-ray with all the additional game extras and features. The Xbox 360 Collector's Edition includes the same extras and featurettes but on a separate disc without Hard Boiled. The Xbox 360 and the PlayStation 3 editions were both packed in a tin case with a holographic cover motif.

On December 6, 2007, Midway released a downloadable map pack for the PlayStation 3 and Xbox 360 video game systems. The map pack featured 10 additional multiplayer maps, as well as 21 all-new multiplayer character skins. The Xbox 360 version also included 10 new achievements worth 250 points.

Warner Bros. Interactive Entertainment re-released the Windows version of the game through GOG.com on November 26, 2019.

== Reception ==
Reception

Aggregate score
Aggregator	Score		
Aggregator	PC	PS3	Xbox 360
Metacritic	77/100	77/100	77/100

Review scores
Publication	Score		
Publication	PC	PS3	Xbox 360
The A.V. Club	N/A	N/A	B
Destructoid	N/A	N/A	4.5/10
Electronic Gaming Monthly	N/A	N/A	7.67/10
Eurogamer	N/A	N/A	8/10
Famitsu	N/A	N/A	29/40
Game Informer	N/A	N/A	7.25/10
GameRevolution	N/A	N/A	C−
GameSpot	7/10	7/10	7/10
GameSpy	3.5/5	4/5	4/5
GameTrailers	N/A	N/A	7.7/10
IGN	8.1/10	8.1/10	(AU) 8.4/10 (US) 8.1/10
Official Xbox Magazine (US)	N/A	N/A	7/10
PC Gamer (US)	79%	N/A	N/A
PlayStation: The Official Magazine	N/A	3.5/5	N/A
The New York Times	N/A	N/A	(positive)

The game received "generally favorable reviews" on all platforms according to the review aggregation website Metacritic. IGN praised the cinematic flair and melodrama in the storyline true to the style of John Woo, enjoyable battles, and slick presentation. However, they said that the visuals were lacking, the game was too short, and inauthentic because the characters do not speak Cantonese. GameSpot said that although the game is solid in every department, it is repetitive, due to a short seven-hour single-player game and weak multiplayer. Electronic Gaming Monthly stated that the Xbox 360 version was "a game whose movie influences are more than skin deep." In Japan, where the Xbox 360 version was ported and published by Success on May 22, 2008, followed by the PlayStation 3 version on September 11, 2008, Famitsu gave the former console version a score of 29 out of 40.

Eduardo Zacarias of GameZone gave the Xbox 360 version eight out of ten, saying, "Sure, the action can get repetitive in places and many of the moves seen here have been done before many times, but the cinematic feel is pure Woo and that's definitely worth a look." However, Brock Smith gave the PC version 7.6 out of 10, saying, "If you are a fan of third-person action or Jon Woo, this game will deliver a fun and exciting ride. If you are into deep stories and complex characters with story plot twists, avoid this and anything else John Woo for that matter." Nick Valentino later gave the PlayStation 3 version 8.2 out of 10, saying, "Like a true action-packed cinematic spectacle, Stranglehold delivers a number of spectacular moments that will not fail to dazzle hardcore fans of the genre." GamePro gave the Xbox 360 version four out of five, saying, "Stranglehold might stumble occasionally under its own ambitious weight, and might not quite deliver on all its promises and potential, but it's still a unique and absorbing 8-hour tour through a legendary action director's potent unfilmable dreams." Edge gave the same Xbox 360 version a score of seven out of ten, saying, "The chemistry of control, animation, AI and environmental damage systems is absolutely spot on, both in finding Hard Boiled's groove and providing coherent, rhythmic and unpredictable action."

The game sold more than one million units worldwide.

== Legacy ==
According to The Hollywood Reporter, Lion Rock Entertainment would be making the sequel to John Woo's Hard Boiled. The film would be based on the plot of Stranglehold. In an interview with Twitchfilm Terence Chang announced that the film would be a prequel to Hard Boiled with a much younger Tequila. Hong Kong actor-director Stephen Fung would direct the film in Singapore and the U.S. with a $20 million budget. Since the initial announcement of a big-screen version of Stranglehold, there has been no further news on its production. It is presumed that the project was a victim of Midway Games' bankruptcy.

A video game sequel to Stranglehold, entitled Gun Runner, was in the works prior to Midway's financial demise but was ultimately cancelled.
