= Jack-Bot =

1995 pinball machine

Jack•Bot
- Manufacturer: Williams
- Release date: October 10, 1995
- System: Williams WPC-Security
- Model #: 50051
- Design: Barry Oursler; Larry DeMar
- Programming: Larry DeMar; Louis Koziarz
- Artwork: John Youssi
- Mechanics: Robert C. Friesl; Bob Brown
- Music: Jon Hey
- Sound: Jon Hey
- Voices: Dave Zabriskie (Pin*Bot); Lia Mortensen (The Machine)
- Production run: 2,428

Jack-Bot (styled JACK•BOT) is a 1995 pinball game which was designed by Barry Oursler and Larry DeMar, and released by US-based electronic gaming company Williams. It is the third game in the Pin-Bot series, following Pin-Bot (1986) and The Machine: Bride of Pin-Bot (1991).

== Description ==
The game has a futuristic casino theme. Certain elements of the original Pin-Bot table carry over to Jack-Bot, such as the spiral ramp, visor targets, and locking the balls in the holes to activate Pin-Bot's eyes.

Jon Hey created the music and sound which includes a new arrangement of the Pin-Bot theme previously composed for Williams Pinball by Chris Granner.

The game uses an easy to understand playfield, where novice players can just shoot up the middle of the playfield. The more sophisticated player can "cheat" to set the rules to their own advantage.

The playfield has the same design as Pin-Bot, with new software and rules. The game was created to fill a possible "hole" in the production line and another game was needed quickly. RePlay reported that the game was easier to build.

== Ball purchase/Extra ball button ==
Jack-Bot also allows players to buy an extra ball for one credit, and then pressing the "EXTRA BALL" button; players can buy a maximum of three balls this way. The game, has two separate high score lists: one for games without buy-ins, and one including buy-ins. The Grand Champion is the highest score of scores where no buy-ins were involved.

Pressing the EXTRA BALL button can also activate various cheats if done properly, such as Pin*Bot changing the results of a dice roll. This is not a hidden feature, and is described on the instruction card.

Pressing the EXTRA BALL button during attract mode activates a message on the dot-matrix display, which reads, "In memory of Joe Joos, Jr.," who had died a year earlier; the display then tells the player a brief biography on Joos. There is a dedication to Joos in the manual for the game.

During attract mode, pressing the left flipper button three times while holding down the EXTRA BALL button activates a long credits roll on the dot-matrix display accompanied by a medley of the game's music.

== Objectives ==
The game has two main objectives: to activate Casino Run and to start Multi-Ball; during Multi-Ball, the objective is to score enough Jack*Bots (jackpots) to light Mega Visor.

== Table Details and Rules ==
=== Vortex Skill Shot ===
As in the original Pin-Bot, the plunger launches the ball towards a spiral ramp known as the Vortex, which has a top, middle, and bottom section. To score the highest value offered, shoot the ball into the middle section.

The vortex value resets to 10 million for each ball unless it is held (see below).

Shooting the middle vortex hole during Multi-Ball can score a Jack*Bot.

=== Hit Me ===
A touch target just above the right inlane/outlane area. Hitting this target randomly draws a card to add to the player's total (starting from zero), with the goal being to reach 21 (as in blackjack) or get as close as possible without busting (going over 21). Each time the target is hit, the player scores 1 million points times the total (i.e., bringing the hand to 17 scores 17 million points). Hitting 21 exactly or busting resets the total to zero, but if the player hits 21 exactly, they win a 50 million point bonus.

Aces can count as 1 or 11, as in regular blackjack.

The Hit Me target can also be used to score up to 75 million points during the Hurry-Up Mode, and for scoring Jack*Bots during Multi-Ball.

=== Poker Targets ===
To the left just beneath the ramp, there are three poker targets. One is lit during play; hitting the lit target advances the bonus multiplier up to 5x. If an unlit target is hit, the player must wait until the targets reset before trying again. If the lit target is hit, and the player hits the two other targets before they reset, the machine spots the player a poker card to be used in the game Pin-Bot Poker (see below).

=== Cashier Target ===
Underneath the left ramp is a cashier target. When activated, the ramp will lift up to allow the ball to go underneath to hit it. Hitting this target can do a variety of things for the player: score the bonus during Cashier Mode, collect the Solar Jets award, doubles the winnings for a casino game, and collect Jack*Bots during Multi-Ball.

=== Ramp and Vortex Increaser ===
When the ramp is down, shooting the ball up the ramp and over to the mini-bagatelle playfield (a carry-over from the original Pin-Bot) begins the Vortex Counter, which gradually adds 1 million points to the value of the vortex (starting from 10 million), up to a maximum of 50 million points. The ball then will randomly make its way either through the hole, activating Solar Jets Mode, down to the right inlane, which will award a random award (which changes in synchronization with the Vortex Counter), or back to the plunger for another skill shot.

==== Solar Jets ====
If the ball falls through this hole and into the bumpers, it triggers Solar Jets mode. The ramp flips up; the player then has about 20 seconds (represented by a slow countdown from 10) to hit the Cashier target to score the Solar Jets value, which starts at 40M and goes up by 4M for each bumper hit. Starting Multiball or Casino Run before the timer runs out will also score the Solar Jets award.

==== Inlane Awards ====
If the ball goes through the right inlane, it will trigger one of the following awards:

- 25 Million: Awards 25 million points.
- Cashier: The player has 20 seconds (represented by a slow countdown from 10) to hit the Cashier target and score twice the bonus value (though this replaces the end-of-ball bonus instead of adding to it). Starting Multi-Ball or Casino Run also awards the Cashier value.
- Light Extra Ball: Lights an extra ball on one of the inlanes/outlanes. The light can be moved by pressing the flipper buttons.
- Mega Ramp: Lights the left ramp. The player must shoot the ball up the ramp within 5 seconds to win the Mega Ramp value, starting at 50 million, and increasing by 25 million each time it is achieved.

=== Game Saucer ===
The Game Saucer is a narrow lane leading to a ball trap that is located just to the right of the left ramp. Shoot the ball into this trap to begin a casino game. During Multi-Ball, shoot the ball into this trap to collect a Jack*Bot, and during Casino Run, this trap is one of several that can be used to spin the wheels on the slot machine.

=== Visor and 5x5 Grid Keno Lights ===
As in the original Pin-Bot, the machine has a visor that begins the game closed, and a 5x5 grid of lights underneath it, colored yellow, blue, orange, green, and red, in that order. Above the lights are a visor row of targets that light the lights vertically in columns, and to the right side is a side row of lights that light the lights in each row horizontally. To open the visor, the player either needs to complete the grid by hitting the targets in any order, or by shooting the correct visor or side row target when the lights are initially flashing; the lights initially flash one column at a time, left to right, and then one row at a time, top to bottom. In the latter case, opening the visor by shooting the correct target awards a 50 million point bonus (after this is done, however, the machine requires the player to open the visor each subsequent time by just completing all 25 lights on the grid in any order).

In Jack-Bot, the lights are known as Keno Lights, and each column also has a white arrow above it. When the visor is closed, shooting the ball into the target when the white arrow is lit awards a Keno Award:

- Vortex at Max: Automatically brings the vortex value to 50 million.
  Add Vortex Value: Increases the value of the vortex if it isn't already at 50 million.
  Vortex Held: Carries the value of the vortex over to the next ball, including extra balls.
  25M: Awards 25 million points.
  Add Poker Card: Spots an extra poker card for Pin-Bot Poker.
  5X Bonus: Brings the bonus multiplier to 5X, the maximum available in the game. (Note that after the ball drains, pressing the EXTRA BALL button enough times to activate a cheat results in Pin-Bot slamming the 5X graphic, making it 6X; this is the only time a player can get a 6X Bonus.)
  Game Saucer Lit: Before the first Multi-Ball, and only before the first Multi-Ball, if the Game Saucer isn't lit, hitting the arrow will light the saucer.
  Extra Ball: Awards an extra ball; usually awarded only on the last ball if the player's total score is under 300 million points.

When the visor opens, the player can lock a ball into one of Pin-Bot's eye sockets; doing so puts another ball to the plunger, and locking the second ball begins Multi-Ball.

If the visor is open, and the player hasn't started Multi-Ball yet, completing all 25 lights a second time lights an Extra Ball light above the inlane and outlane roll-overs.

=== Extra Ball ===
The inlane and outlane roll-overs have an extra ball light above them, which the player collects by getting the ball to roll over the lit inlane or outlane. It is possible to have more than one light lit and collect multiple Extra Balls.

However, there's a limit of five such per game, and any in excess scores 250 million instead.

== Multi-Ball ==
To start Multi-Ball, the player needs to lock both balls in the eye sockets of Pin-Bot. The first Multi-Ball is a 2-ball Multi-Ball, while subsequent Multi-Balls are 3-ball Multi-Balls; in the latter case, the player must shoot a ball from the plunger to the vortex to start Multi-Ball.

During Multi-Ball, Jack*bots are lit at the Eyes, at the Cashier target, and at Hit Me. The first Jack*Bot a player scores in a game is worth 50 million; future Jack*bots increase in value by 25M each time, so that the eleventh Jack*bot is 300M. Then the value starts advancing by 50M for each Jack*bot, so that the fifteenth and final Jack*bot is 500M.

Collecting a Jack*bot turns that location's light off; at least one location will always be lit. If the player collects Jack*Bots at all four places, the Cashier target will be relit, and the lit location will move from left-to-right (to the left Eye, then the right, then Hit Me, then back to Cashier) each time it is collected.

Hitting the Game Saucer relights all four Jack*bot locations. If you hit it when all four are already lit, it scores a Jack*bot instead.

Collecting Jack*bot at one of the Eyes, then hitting the other Eye (lit or not) within a second, scores a Super Jack*bot instead. This triples the points (thus; a Super Jack*bot can be as high as 1.5 billion points).

Multi-ball ends when the player is down to one ball in play. There is about a three-second grace period during which a Jack*bot can still be scored. If the player loses a Multi-ball without scoring any Jack*bots at all, they are given a 10-second restart period; hitting the Eyes or the Game Saucer before the time runs out restarts a two-ball Multi-ball with a skill shot at the plunger. Only one restart per Multi-ball is allowed, however; if this occurs a second time, the player has to start from scratch.

After Multi-ball is over, the Visor will remain open until the game decides that the ball is in a place where it won't get caught behind the Visor when it closes. The ramp, the Cashier target, the Game Saucer, the rubber below the Game Saucer, the Poker Targets, and the Solar Jets will all trigger the Visor to close. As soon as the Visor starts closing, the Keno card will reset (with a row or column flashing for an instant Visor re-open), ready for the player to start refilling it.

== Mega Visor ==
Once the player has accumulated 15 or more Jack*Bots (including Super Jack*Bots), the Mega Visor mode is active. The Visor closes; the object now is to re-open it. The side row targets are ignored; only the Visor targets themselves count, and each hit spots one light in the column you hit, with 50M awarded for each light spotted. Twenty-five hits are needed to complete the card, which means a potential 1.5 billion points can be scored along the way. The player can hit any combination of colors to open the Visor.

When the visor opens up, the player can lock the balls in the eye sockets as before, and doing so earns a chance at a Mega Jack*Bot (always valued at least 1 billion points per Jack*Bot, although the Machine will still say "Super Jack*Bot!" when this is achieved). To score a Mega Jack*Bot, shoot the ball up the left ramp after locking a ball.

== Casino Games ==
To activate Casino Run, the player first needs to play all four Casino games. Games are initiated by hitting the Game Saucer when it is lit during single-ball play; if it's not lit, hitting the ramp or Cashier target will relight it, as will the Keno awards the first time through. Before the first Casino Run is unlocked, the Game Saucer will always be lit at the start of each ball; for the second and subsequent Casino Runs, the player must hit the ramp or Cashier to relight it. (Also, the Cashier target stops relighting the Game Saucer; the player has to make actual ramp shots.)

=== The Casino Games ===
There are four games in total Pin-Bot can play: Pin-Bot Poker, the Slot Machine, Roll the Dice, and Keno. Pressing the EXTRA BALL button repeatedly when it flashes gives the player an opportunity to cheat at the games, but this doesn't always happen.

In all four games, the machine will ask the player to either accept the total or attempt "DOUBLE OR NOTHING." If the player chooses to double, they have a limited time to shoot the ball under the left ramp and hit the Cashier target. Doing so doubles the player's winnings; if time expires or the ball is lost, no points are scored for that game. If the player takes too long to respond, the game will automatically pick the option to simply collect the bonus.

==== Pin-Bot Poker ====
This game uses the poker hand displayed at the center of the playfield. The Poker Targets, Keno awards, Casino Run, and Slot Machine can all light cards in this hand. (Completing the hand the first time lights an Extra Ball.) Points are awarded based on the value of the hand: 10 million points for a single deuce, 15 million for an ace or ace-deuce, 20 million for one pair, 30 million for two pair or three of a kind, or 50 million for a full house (all five cards). In addition, a flat 50 million is scored for each hand the player has already filled. The resulting total can be doubled later.

If the player successfully cheats, Pin-Bot pulls an extra Ace from his sleeve. ("Ace of Clubs?") This can give players a hand that is normally impossible: four Aces, worth 149M million points. (Players can still double this to 298 million if they wish.)

==== Slot Machine ====
The slot machine wheels spin and reveal a random award:

- Multi-Ball: Starts Multi-Ball.
- Special: Awards a Special; typically one credit, though it can be set to extra ball or points. When set to extra ball, and you are at the limit for extra balls, it will give 500 million points.
- Add 10 Cards: Adds 2 complete poker hands to the player's grand total.
- Hurry Up: Starts a timer that counts down from 75 million to 15 million; the player must shoot the "Hit Me" target in order to collect the bonus.
- Collect Bonus: Awards the player the bonus they would have received if they had lost the ball.
- Vortex at Max: Sets the Vortex value to 50 million automatically.
- Hold Vortex Value: Carries the Vortex value over to the next ball (including extra balls).
- Bonus: Awards a random bonus generally between 25 million and 40 million points. Players have the option to double the winnings if they wish.
- Lite Extra Ball: Lights the extra ball.

This is the hardest of the games to successfully cheat, but if done, Pin-Bot will slam the reels, and it will change to "Extra Ball Lit."

==== Roll the Dice ====
The game is based on the "Dice Game Wager" which begins at 3 million points, and increases by 100,000 points each time the ball makes contact with the bumpers located just below the mini-bagatelle playfield (known as the Solar Jet Bumpers). The Machine rolls the dice, and whatever she rolls is multiplied by the Dice Game Wager (i.e. 5,500,000 x 6 = 33,000,000). Players can then decide to double if they wish.

If the player successfully cheats, Pin-Bot will simply flick the dice so that the result is always a 12, and announce, "BOXCARS!"

==== Keno ====
This game is based on the Keno card (the 5x5 grid of lights under the visor); the player's progress on the grid determines how many squares are chosen for the random drawing. Six squares are picked at random, and the player wins 5 million points per square matched, plus 5 million points just for participating. If all six squares match, the player wins 50 million points. Players also win an additional 25 million points for every card filled previously. In the event the player has less than five squares lit on the grid, the game will allow the player to use the full center column to give them a chance at making some matches.

If the player successfully does a cheat, Pin-Bot will slam the whole card, giving the result that 25 matches were made, awarding the player 99 million points.

As before, the player can then decide whether or not they want to try and double the winnings.

== Casino Run ==
After all four games have been played, the Casino Run mode is activated; the player must shoot the Game Saucer trap again to activate it. During this run, the player has 45 seconds to spin the wheels as many times as possible. Shooting the Game Saucer trap or one of Pin-Bot's eye sockets spins the wheels. The player then has to decide whether to collect the bonus and end the run, or risk it and continue playing (akin to the bonus round of the game show The Joker's Wild). Players can unlock an Easter egg by pressing the EXTRA BALL button when it flashes during the introductory sequence to Casino Run, and if successful, they will see a cow jumping over the Moon.

Spins of the wheels can award the following:

- Points: Various point values. Sometimes the spaces might be left blank, but this doesn't affect the player any.
- Lite Extra Ball: Lights an extra ball, which can later be collected when the inlanes and outlanes are lit. Extra balls are at risk for being lost if the player runs out of time or spins a bomb.
- Special: Awards a special, which also runs the risk of being lost. If the player collects their bank, they win the special.
- Vortex X: Adds a skill shot multiplier to the Vortex.
- Poker Card: Adds a poker card to the current poker hand (which can also light the extra ball).
- Jack*Bot: Adds a Jack*Bot to the player's total number of Jack*Bots; the points are scored immediately and do not count toward the total in the Casino Run Bank.
  More Time: Adds 15 seconds to the timer, though it never exceeds 45.
  Cow: The player wins an automatic special without having to risk it.
  No Bomb: The player wins no points, but wins a bucket of water.
  Bomb: Ends the player's run and erases all points and awards earned up to that point. If the player spun a "No Bomb" earlier, or spins a Bomb and No Bomb together, the effect of the bomb is cancelled, and the machine will flash "BOMB DEFUSED."

While the timer is counting down, the player's Casino Run Bank, which begins at 100 million points, adds 4 million points each time the ball hits a switch, rollover, or bumper. Players must remember that the clock is ticking; if time expires, they lose everything in their bank.

The game awards a credit at the end of its conclusion after the player enters their initials if they have the highest total Casino Run score to date.

The game also has an Easter egg hidden; if the player holds both flippers while the wheels are spinning, they might instead receive a hint for the game Mortal Kombat 3 (Midway Games was co-owned at the time with Williams/Bally). Getting the hint also awards an extra ball. (Mortal Kombat 3 also has a Kombat Kode that explains getting the hint in this game, instructing players to "Hold Flippers During Casino Run"; another hint is for another pinball table, No Fear: Dangerous Sports, which also provides an MK3 hint.)

== End-of-Ball Bonus ==
The following criteria applies to scoring for the end-of-ball bonus:

- Cards: 3 million for each Poker and Hit Me card collected during the game.
- Vortex Value: Whatever the current skill shot value is (without the multiplier) is what is added. This will be between 10 million and 50 million.
- Dice Game Wager: Whatever the current wager is at that point is what is added.

The entire bonus then gets multiplied by the bonus multiplier; this will be between 1x and 5x.

If the player presses the EXTRA BALL button repeatedly during the bonus count, Pin-Bot may cheat on the bonus multiplier by slamming the screen; this gives an extra bonus X. Cheating successfully in this manner is the only way to achieve a 6X. The bonus multiplier must be at least 2X to allow the player to cheat.

However, all of the above end-of-round bonuses are forfeited upon tilting.

== Buy-Ins and High Score Lists ==
The player is allowed up to 3 buy-ins following the last ball, for a maximum of six total balls, not counting extra balls. For this reason, the game has two high score lists: one with buy-ins and one without buy-ins. The player with the highest score without a single buy-in is the player deemed Grand Champion. The game also allows players to enter their initials if they have the highest Casino Run score to date.

== Reception ==
Pinball Player found that due to its depth it is a good game for home use, but could suffer on location due to its complicated rules. The combination of gambling and robots to create its theme was found to be a "little odd".

== Digital versions ==
A licensed digital version of this table was released for The Pinball Arcade in April 2015 for several platforms, and was available until June 30, 2018, when the license for Williams tables expired.
