= Psi-Ops: The Mindgate Conspiracy =

2004 video game

- North American PlayStation 2 box art
- Developer: Midway
- Publishers: Midway; Zoo Digital Publishing (PC)
- Director: Brian Eddy
- Producer: Alexander Offermann
- Designer: Brian Eddy
- Programmer: Jason Blochowiak
- Artist: Chip Sineni
- Composer: Vincent Pontarelli
- Platforms: PlayStation 2, Xbox, Windows
- Release: PlayStation 2, Xbox: NA: June 14, 2004; EU: October 1, 2004; Windows: EU: February 11, 2005
- Genres: Action-adventure, third-person shooter
- Modes: Single-player, multiplayer

Psi-Ops: The Mindgate Conspiracy is a 2004 action-adventure video game developed by Midway for the Xbox, PlayStation 2, and Microsoft Windows. The game was developed as a means for Midway to develop new game physics capabilities. The primary game mechanic in Psi-Ops is the use of six different psychic abilities: telekinesis, remote viewing, mind drain, mind control, pyrokinesis, and aura view. These abilities are unlocked throughout the game and used in conjunction with stealth and third-person shooter gameplay to combat enemies and solve puzzles.

Psi-Ops follows Nick Scryer, a psychic secret agent who had his memory wiped and got captured by a terrorist organization run by rogue psychic agents. He fights against the group as his memories return and his powers are reawakened, and he learns about a conspiracy to take control of a powerful artifact. He is accompanied by Sara Blake, a woman who claims to be another undercover agent, but Scryer is unsure whether she can be trusted.

Development of Psi-Ops was plagued by time constraints. It was launched with a tie-in music video for an original song, "With My Mind" by Cold. Psi-Ops received generally positive reviews, and critics lauded its gameplay. Other aspects, such as its plot, controls, audio, and level design received mixed reception. The game saw poor sales, and plans for a sequel were shelved by Midway. In 2026, Sony announced the game would be re-released on the PlayStation 4 and PlayStation 5.

== Gameplay ==
Psi-Ops is a third-person shooter and action-adventure game featuring run-and-gun gameplay. The core gameplay involves the use of several psychic abilities with which the player can fight enemies and interact with the world. The player starts with no psychic powers in the first level and unlocks them throughout the game as the character's memory is restored. As each ability is unlocked, the game enters a flashback sequence from when the character learned how to use the ability, functioning as a tutorial. The abilities cost psi-energy, of which the player only has a limited supply, and psychic abilities cannot be used when psi-energy is depleted.

- Telekinesis allows the player to lift and throw objects. This allows the player to throw items at enemies, lift enemies to throw or shoot them, build structures to climb, or to stand on objects to levitate. Levels are populated with crates and explosive barrels that can be manipulated with telekinesis. Stronger enemies are resistant to the telekinesis ability.
- Remote viewing allows the player to venture past the current area, leaving the character's body behind, to explore adjacent rooms.
- Mind drain allows the player to obtain more psi-energy from the minds of enemies to power his other abilities. It can be used on dead enemies for limited energy or on living enemies to get large amounts of energy. After draining a live enemy's mind, the enemy dies as his head explodes.
- Mind control allows the player to take control of enemy characters and use them to attack other enemies or force them to commit suicide. This also allows the player to have enemies access switches that are otherwise unreachable. The player's body is still vulnerable while controlling an enemy.
- Pyrokinesis allows the player to project fire to attack enemies and create explosions.
- Aura view allows the player to see things that are normally hidden, such as entrances to secret areas and glowing auras around enemies that indicate whether the player has been detected. It also allows the player to see certain enemies that are normally invisible.

There are five different weapons in the game that the player can use in addition to the psychic abilities: a pistol, a shotgun, a machine gun, an assault rifle, and a sniper rifle. Combat in Psi-Ops also includes optional elements of stealth gameplay. The stealth gameplay is most prominent in the early levels before the character's psychic abilities are unlocked. The player is significantly more powerful than most enemies, meaning that they are only difficult to fight in large numbers. Besides combat, the game includes puzzles for the player to solve. The game mechanics are open-ended so that different approaches or combinations of abilities exist to defeat enemies and solve puzzles. Some elements of the game include horror aspects, including both gore-based violence as well as more existential and Lovecraftian elements.

Each level of Psi-Ops is a linear path from one end of the level to the other. These levels include boss fights in which the player fights one of The Movement's psychic members, each with a different psychic ability that defines the boss fight. Six of these boss fights are found throughout the game. Shorter bonus levels can be unlocked in addition to the main game. It also includes a multiplayer mode in which one player controls the character's movement and the other player controls his psychic abilities.

== Plot ==
An enemy being lifted with telekinesis in Psi-Ops; the top left denotes the ability being used, the character's health, and the remaining psi-energy. The bottom right denotes the active weapon and remaining ammo.

Nick Scryer is a psychic agent with the Mindgate organization. Along with his fellow agent Sara Blake, he is sent to infiltrate the terrorist organization The Movement, a group of former Mindgate agents led by The General who control an army of brainwashed soldiers. To evade psychic detection, Scryer's memories are wiped and his powers are deactivated.

Rendezvousing with Blake after a successful infiltration, she gives him an injection to bring back his memories. His memories and powers are gradually restored over the course of the story. Scryer navigates the facility he's held in and finds its blueprints for Blake. She then has him plant three warheads in specific locations. After planting the bombs and killing The Movement's master of mind control Jov Leonov, Scryer escapes with Blake on board a helicopter as the facility explodes. Scryer and Blake arrive at a facility where they find an artifact called Luna-1. Scryer takes it, but he runs into Blake later and she asks to hold on to it. When Scryer confronts The Movement's master of telekinesis Edgar Barrett, he discovers that Blake turned Luna-1 over to The Movement.

Scryer pursues Barrett to another facility, leaving Blake behind. Here he meets a reluctant member of The Movement, Kimiko Jones. She explains that Luna-1 is a fragment of another artifact, the Monolith, and that World War II and the Cold War were fought over such fragments. The Movement's master of illusions, Wei Lu tries to stop him from navigating the facility by creating visions of his dead allies returning as zombies. He confronts her, and he kills her after she transforms herself into a monster. Scryer encounters Blake, and she says she doesn't understand when he accuses her of siding with The Movement. Scryer continues through the facility and finds The General putting the Monolith in a machine powered by The Movement's master of pyrokinesis, Marlena Kessler. Scryer kills her, but The General gets away with the Monolith. As the facility's fusion reactor overloads, Scryer escapes in the helicopter to chase The General while Jones stays behind to contain the explosion.

Scryer follows The General to a temple filled with invisible flying beasts controlled by The Movement's master of remote viewing, Nicolas Wrightson. He rescues Blake, who is being held hostage, and she gives him a device to use at an uplink to repel the beasts. Scryer and Blake then encounter Sara's missing twin sister Tanya, who admits to killing their parents and taking Luna-1 from Scryer. Wrightson kidnaps Sara, so Scryer breaks open Wrightson's protective hatch, and the beasts turn on him as he is pulled into their dimension. Scryer navigates the caverns to find where The General and Barrett are activating the Monolith. After it is ready, The General kills Barrett so he does not have to share the power. He activates the Monolith and gains psychic powers, but Scryer collects energy fragments output by the machine and uses them to kill The General. After defeating The General, Scryer and Blake see their allies arriving in helicopters. Scryer's final memories return as the helicopters turn against them. The game ends on a cliffhanger with a "to be continued" screen.

== Development ==
Psi-Ops was developed by Midway Games. Brian Eddy served as the game's director, with Jason Blochowiak as lead programmer, Sal Divita as visual director, Chip Sineni as art director, and Alexander Offerman as producer. The game used the Havok physics middleware integrated with a custom game engine that the team designed specifically for the game. The plot of Psi-Ops was inspired by experiments carried out by the United States Department of Defense to investigate the veracity of psychic abilities as well as the conspiracy theories that developed about the experiments. According to Eddy, the developers explored this topic after a member of the team attempted to use remote viewing to see inside of a terrorist compound. Around 50 to 60 people worked on the game at its peak.

The main goal during early development was to prove that psychic abilities were a viable form of gameplay, so the team workshopped how different game mechanics would function and how they would be depicted. A series of 3D videos were created to demonstrate what the abilities and other aspects of the game would look visually. To test the game's mechanics, the developers created a one-room sandbox level filled with items and enemies. They found the level to be so fun to play in that they included it as a bonus feature in the game.

Time constraints were an issue throughout development. Psi-Ops was not ready for publication as the planned release date in late 2003 approached, so it was delayed until May 2004. According to Eddy, time constraints prevented the team from perfecting the gameplay and graphics, but positive reception from focus groups ensured that the game was not canceled mid-development.

== Promotion and release ==
The earliest promotion of Psi-Ops advertised it under the name ESPionage. The name was changed after it was decided that it did not convey the use of psychic abilities within the game. The main character was going to be called Nick Geller at this time, reminiscent of self-proclaimed psychic Uri Geller. Midway Vice President Helene Sheeler promoted the game as the first to let players use psychic abilities in an action stealth game.

Psi-Ops was first previewed at E3 2003, still under the name ESPionage. Midway needed a project to promote, and while the game was still early in development, Midway featured it against the wishes of the developers. Character designs were only placeholders that did not appear in the final product, and the game design changed significantly between the first preview and the final release. To promote Psi-Ops, Midway collaborated with Geffen Records and produced an original song for the game, "With My Mind" by Cold. A music video was produced for the song, directed by Marc Webb.

Psi-Ops was produced for PlayStation 2 and Xbox, and it was released in North America on June 14, 2004, and in Europe on October 1, 2004. A port for Windows was released the following year by ZOO Digital on February 11 in Europe. The game was also released by Capcom in Japan exclusively for PlayStation 2 on November 10, 2005. A GameCube version was planned, but it was canceled prior to the game's launch.

== Reception ==
Reception

Aggregate score
Aggregator	Score
Metacritic	84/100

Review scores
Publication	Score
1Up.com	8/10
Eurogamer	8/10
Game Informer	9/10
GameRevolution	B
GameSpot	8.4/10
GameZone	8.6
IGN	8.5/10
TeamXbox	8.2
VideoGamer.com	8/10

=== Gameplay ===
Critics overwhelmingly praised Psi-Ops for its gameplay and its focus on the game's psi-powers. (Note: Cited to several sources.) Of particular interest was the open-ended nature of combat and the variety of ways to combine psi-powers. (Note: Cited to several sources.) Leone described the game as a "fleshed out tech demo". Reviewers made note of the telekinesis ability specifically, describing it as the most important of the abilities and crediting it for making the gameplay engaging. (Note: Cited to several sources.) Critics also praised the game for introducing new abilities and mechanics as the player progresses through the game. Andy Young of Video Gamer criticized the game's lack of a destructible environment and the difficulty in discerning what objects can be interacted with.

Critics praised the accessibility of the controls, which allow the player to access all psi-powers immediately without having to find them in a menu. Joe Dodson of Game Revolution disagreed, saying that the controller was overburdened and that the game was in need of custom button-mapping. Reviewers were critical of the camera controls, though Reed said that it "never ever lets you down". Luiz approved of the game's aiming control, while Gamesradar described them as "fiddly".

The game's tutorial system was widely praised for introducing players to new gameplay elements without interrupting gameplay. (Note: Cited to several sources.) Young felt that the flashback nature of the tutorials complemented the plot. Also endorsed by critics were the game's boss battles as well as its bonus content and unlockable extras. The multiplayer mode was generally panned, though Reed found it to be an interesting addition.

Andrew Reiner of Game Informer said that the game was on par with other third-person shooters "even without the telepathic hook", and Eduardo Zacarias of GameZone approved of the gun mechanics, saying that it did not differ from other games but that it was sufficient. Dodson praised the game's puzzles, complimenting their integration into the main gameplay as opposed to minigames. Critics noted the short length of the game, though Young considered this to be beneficial as "a case of quality over quantity".

=== Plot and characters ===
The plot saw mixed reception from reviewers, several of whom described it as unoriginal and predictable. Matt Leone of 1UP felt that the cliffhanger ending was a disservice to the plot that left it unsatisfying. Some reviewers considered the plot to be a sufficient vehicle for the gameplay, while others described it as "cheesy" in an endearing way.

Will Tuttle of GameSpy believed Nick Scryer to be "a compelling main character", while Luiz H. C. of Bloody Disgusting considered the integration of Scryer's amnesia into the gameplay complemented the otherwise generic plot of a military protagonist with amnesia. Other reviewers enjoyed the eccentric nature of the villains. Kristan Reed of EuroGamer was disappointed in the characters, feeling that their personalities were weak and that the character models were overly sexualized.

=== Design and technical aspects ===
Reviewers praised the level design, saying they were constructed in a way that facilitates the use of the psi-power game mechanics and encourages players to experiment. This included overwhelming praise for the assortment of deadly objects and environments that could be used by the player in combat. (Note: Cited to several sources.) Some found the overall aesthetic of the levels to be boring, and Ivan Sulic of IGN criticized the game's "back-tracking" and "aimless wandering". One reviewer from Electronic Gaming Monthly criticized the final levels, saying they were more generic and that their new game mechanics harmed the player's experience.

Reviewers' opinions of the graphics varied. Young said they were "great", Will Tuttle of GameSpy said they were "not great", Sulic said they were "competent", and Brent Soboleski of Team Xbox said that they worked as functional background elements because were not noticeably good or bad. Praise for the graphics focused on the character animations and the visual effects when using the game's psi-powers. The primary criticism of the game's visual design of the game was that it is bland and featureless.Psi-Ops was widely praised for its physics and its use of the Havok physics engine, (Note: Cited to several sources.) and critics overwhelmingly approved of the game's ragdoll physics, which appeared prominently in the game through the use of telekinesis against enemies. (Note: Cited to several sources.) Also praised was the use of the game's physics engine when objects are destroyed or blown up.

Critics were split on the voice acting. Some reviewers felt it was adequate, and many said that it was mostly solid except some noticeable missteps and awkward lines. Some reviewers criticized it in its entirety, with Dodson blaming his dislike for the voice acting on the script rather than the actors. The sound effects were generally praised, particularly the violent effects when the player deals damage to enemies. Zacarias felt that the sound effects were inconsistent, arguing that some elements should have been more audible. The game's score was poorly received, though Eduardo Zacarias of GameZone found it sufficient.

Zacarias praised the artificial intelligence of enemy characters, but Adam Smith of Rock, Paper, Shotgun argued the opposite, saying they "were about as smart as a sack of potatoes". Sulic and Dodson criticized the enemies for their poor spawning as they appear without explanation and surprise players from behind. The game was also praised for short loading times. Dodson felt that the game had too many glitches, saying that it "doesn't seem like an entirely finished product".

=== Nominations and recognition ===
Psi-Ops was nominated for two awards during the 8th Annual Interactive Achievement Awards: "Outstanding Achievement in Character or Story Development" and "Console Action/Adventure Game of the Year", but it lost to Fable and Grand Theft Auto: San Andreas, respectively. GameSpot named Psi-Ops the best PlayStation 2 game of June 2004. In 2009, GamesRadar included it among the games "with untapped franchise potential". In 2010, UGO ranked it as #21 on the list of the games that need sequels. That same year, Psi-Ops was included as one of the titles in the book 1001 Video Games You Must Play Before You Die. Despite its initial positive reception, Psi-Ops sold poorly and was largely forgotten by the gaming community after its release. It is often listed as a "hidden gem" of the sixth generation of video game consoles.

== Legacy ==
Director Brian Eddy attributed the game's weak sales to its marketing, saying that Midway had restructured its marketing team half way through the game's promotion. Shortly after the game's release, film producers Adrian Askarieh and Chuck Gordon purchased its film rights. The intention was to release the film at the same time as the game's sequel.

Midway was sued for $1.5 million in 2007 by William L. Crawford III, who alleged that Psi-Ops and its plot was stolen from his 1998 screenplay of the same name. According to Crawford, he had spoken to Midway about the project in 2001. Judge Florence-Marie Cooper ruled in Midway's favor in 2008, finding there was no evidence of copyright violation.

While a sequel was considered, Midway decided against it due to poor sales. A story for the sequel was never decided on, but Eddy said that it likely would have involved Scryer's Mindgate organization hunting him after they fear he has become too powerful. The developers considered adding new psychic powers, new uses for existing ones, more destructible environments, larger levels, smarter enemy AI, and new gameplay mechanics such as vehicle use. Many of the developers for Psi-Ops went to work on Stranglehold, which included aspects such as destructible environments that they had wished to include in a Psi-Ops sequel. Midway continued suffering from internal issues and ended operations five years after the release of Psi-Ops. During its dissolution, the rights to Psi-Ops were purchased by Warner Bros. alongside hundreds of other intellectual properties. Psi-Ops was released as a free download with advertisements on FilePlanet in 2008, and was considered abandonware until Sony announced in 2026 that it would be re-released on the PlayStation 5.
