= Brian Eddy =

American pinball designer

- Born: 20 April 1968 (age 58); Detroit, Michigan, U.S.
- Occupations: Pinball and Video Game designer
- Employer: Midway Games
- Notable work: Attack from Mars; FunHouse

Brian R. Eddy (born April 20th, 1968) is an American game designer and programmer, best known for designing Attack From Mars pinball for Midway and programming FunHouse and, with Larry DeMar, The Machine: Bride of Pin*Bot. While at Williams Electronics / Midway Games, he also designed Medieval Madness, and programmed Indiana Jones: The Pinball Adventure. Eddy holds three patents related to game design.

== Biography ==
Eddy began his career in pinball in 1989 at age 21, working as a programmer for Williams. He worked on the notable pinball machines, Black Rose, The Machine: Bride of Pin-Bot, and Indiana Jones: The Pinball Adventure. He then became a designer and created his best known machines, Attack from Mars and Medieval Madness, as well as The Shadow.

After the closure of Midway's pinball division in 1999, Eddy moved to Midway's video game division, where he worked on Psi-Ops: The Mindgate Conspiracy, and several games in the Mortal Kombat franchise. As a programmer and designer, he also worked in slot machines and eventually became executive director and producer of Midway Home Entertainment.

In the 2000s and 2010s, Eddy worked in a range of electronic games, including home consoles, mobile, and online games. He worked as a technology consultant with Rand McNally, and in 2012 wrote the book, Classic Video Games: The Golden Age 1971–1984. That same year, Eddy joined Spooky Cool Labs, a game design firm founded by former Williams programmer Larry DeMar as chief creative officer. In 2013, he became president and the company was acquired by Zynga.

In 2018, Eddy left Spooky Cool Labs and joined Stern as senior game designer. His first pinball machine for the company, released in December 2019 was Stranger Things, based on the television show. His second game, based on the show The Mandalorian, was released in 2021 and the Venom game was released in 2023.

== Games ==
=== Pinball ===
- Diner (1990) (effects)
- Bad Cats (1990) (effects)
- Pool Sharks (1990) (software)
- FunHouse (1990) (effects)
- The Machine: Bride of Pin*Bot (1991) (software)
- Black Rose (1992) (software)
- Indiana Jones: The Pinball Adventure (1993) (concept, software)
- The Shadow (1994) (design, software)
- Attack From Mars (1995) (design, concept)
- Medieval Madness (1997) (design, concept)
- Stranger Things (2019) (design, concept)
- The Mandalorian (2021) (design, concept)
- Venom (2023) (design, concept)
- Dungeons & Dragons: The Tyrant's Eye (2025) (design, concept)

=== Video games ===
- Arctic Thunder (2001) (project lead)
- Psi-Ops: The Mindgate Conspiracy (2004) (project & design lead)
- Stranglehold (2007) (director)
