= Tales of the Arabian Nights (pinball) =

1996 pinball machine

- Manufacturer: Williams
- Release date: May 1996
- Design: John Popadiuk
- Programming: Louis Koziarz
- Artwork: Pat McMahon
- Mechanics: Jack Skalon, Ernie Pizarro, Joe Loveday
- Music: Dave Zabriskie
- Sound: Dave Zabriskie
- Production run: 3,128 units

Tales of the Arabian Nights is a 1996 pinball machine produced by Williams. The game is based on the stories of One Thousand and One Nights and features a blue jinn who has trapped a princess. The game uses the DCS sound system.

== Design and layout ==
The game has a vertical magnet diverter that grabs the ball and hurls it back at the player when the genie is hit, or can capture the ball and take it below the playfield. The game includes spikes located above the inlanes that rise up and save the ball when the shooting stars are summoned. There are three stand-up targets on the bottom left of the machine which enable the shooting stars.

There is an orbit on both sides of the machine, and a single ramp which has multiple exits. The magic lamp is in the centre of the playfield and consists of two posts on top of a spinning disc with a model of a lamp mounted above them. Towards the right of the lamp is the Bazaar sinkhole. Above and behind the lamp is a physical ball lock mechanism which is reached from either orbit or through the harem next to the lamp. Three pop bumpers are located towards the back right corner of the machine; the ball can reach these via a diverter in the left orbit.

A patent was granted for the captive ball mechanism; two of these are on the machine - one to the right of the right orbit, and the other between the left orbit and ramp entrance which has a saucer just below it.

=== Artwork ===
The woman on the backglass is based on an image of Stephanie Seymour. A reference to Joe Joos, a mechanical engineer at Williams, who died shortly before the release of this machine is hidden on the playfield.

playfield

== Gameplay ==
Players can experience seven Tales of the Arabian Nights that includes a travel around the ancient city of Baghdad, flying with the magic carpet and battling the evil genie, Saleem Bagazi. The evil genie has captured a princess in a magic bottle which is shown on the playfield. Rubbing the magic lamp conjures the good genie, Dimira, to aid the player. As with other mid-1990s Williams machines this is designed for the novice as well as experienced player, with the lamp positioned so beginners will hit it and still enjoy part of the game.

The game is controlled with two flippers and a manual plunger. After attempting a skillshot to charm the snake, players start tales by hitting the genie when the magic bottle is lit. The tales are "The Tale of Sinbad and the Cyclops", "The Tale of Sinbad and the Rocs", "The Tale of Ali Baba", "The Tale of the Forty Thieves", "The Tale of the Flying Horse", "The Tale of Sheherazade", and "The Tale of the Great Camel Race". These tales are completed with a variety shots, the last of which is always the left ramp which collects the jewel associated with the tale.

After collecting the B-A-Z-A-A-R letters from hitting hit it or other targets, hitting it once more collects a random award. Spinning the magic lamp starts the lightning lamp where the player can collect points by keeping the lamp spinning. Starting the lightning lamp also lights a wish at the sinkhole where the player can choose between obtaining one of the jewels and completing a tale, or an alternative award. Three wishes can be stacked and are shown by lights on the playfield.

=== Multiballs ===
The main multiball is started by hitting the genie to spell G-E-N-I-E and locking two balls in the ball lock mechanism by hitting an orbit and letting a magnet capture the ball, or from entering the harem. The player then needs to hit the genie so the ball is captured by the magnet and taken by the diverter below the playfield and the 3-ball multiball begins. Jackpots can be scored by hitting the genie when lit.

H-A-R-E-M can be spelled by hitting the left orbit when advance harem is lit. This is a 2-ball multiball with increasing scores from hitting the bumpers.

=== Genie battle ===
After completing all seven tales the wizard mode can be started by hitting the genie again. The first phase of this wizard mode is played with a single ball where several shots need to be hit to defeat skeletons summoned by the evil genie.

The second phase is a multiball where unlimited balls can be plunged by the player, with a maximum of four balls in play at any time. The bottle with the trapped princess is shown on the display, with the genie pulling on it trying to recapture the princess with the player hitting the main shots to pull the bottle towards them. This ends when either the genie recaptures the bottle, or when the player captures it to free the princess. If successful, the display show the princess and the player's character leaving on the magic carpet.

The end of ball bonus can be a particularly high part of the total score if the lamp has been spun a lot, and the bonus multiplier increased as unlike most pinball tables it doesn't reset on each ball.

== Reception ==
This table is rarely used for competitive tournament play because of an unintended option for skilled players to stack the genie battle wizard mode and harem multiball and play to not win the second phase of the wizard mode to get much higher than intended scores from the harem multiball.

In a 2022 retro review, Pinball Mag found it to be an easy game, suited for casual players.

== Digital versions ==
The first digital version of this table was in the 2001 computer game Williams Pinball Classics.

It was released by FarSight Studios for Pinball Hall of Fame: The Williams Collection on several systems between 2008 and 2011. The same developer released the table in season one of The Pinball Arcade in 2012, and it was available until June 30, 2018, when all Williams tables were removed due to licensing issues.

The table was released by Zen Studios for Pinball FX3 as part of Williams volume 5 on December 10, 2019. A remastered version released for Pinball FX on May 26, 2022.

It was also released in several mobile games, including Zen Studios Williams Pinball mobile app for iOS and Android

== Remakes ==
=== The Forgotten Tales ===
In 2022 an upgrade kit was released in small numbers which included a new CPU running software rewritten in Python and expanding the game from 7 to 14 tales. It includes new multiball modes which require an auto-plunger instead of the original manual plunger.

=== Remake ===
In June 2026 Pedretti Gaming announced two versions of a remake; a legacy edition retaining the original artwork, and the 30th anniversary edition with new artwork and other upgrades. Both versions use updated electronics, RGB lighting, and slightly updated software retaining the original ruleset. Both versions were manufactured in Italy.

== See also ==
- Genie
