= The Machine: Bride of Pin-Bot =

1991 pinball machine

The Machine: Bride of PIN•BOT
- Manufacturer: Williams
- Release date: February 1991
- System: Williams WPC (Alphanumeric)
- Model #: 50002
- Design: Python Anghelo; John Trudeau
- Programming: Brian Eddy
- Artwork: Python Anghelo; John Youssi
- Mechanics: Zofia Bil; Jack Skalon; Joe Joos, Jr.
- Music: Dan Forden
- Sound: Jon Hey; Rich Karstens
- Voices: Stephanie Rogers (The Machine); Barry Oursler (Pin-Bot); Mark Ritchie
- Production run: 8,100

The Machine: Bride of Pin-Bot (styled The Machine: Bride of PIN•BOT) is a 1991 pinball game designed by Python Anghelo and John Trudeau, and released by Williams. It is the second game in the Pin-Bot series, and is the last game produced by Williams to use a segmented score display rather than a dot-matrix screen. It is also one of the few pinball games produced that uses a variable-brightness segmented display.

== Design ==
The design process began with a poem.

You plug her in
And turn her on;
You push her buttons

The right way
Your balls will fly
Up curvy ramps,

Her head will spin,
She’ll scream She’ll moan
The scoring will be high!

— Python Anghelo

== Gameplay ==
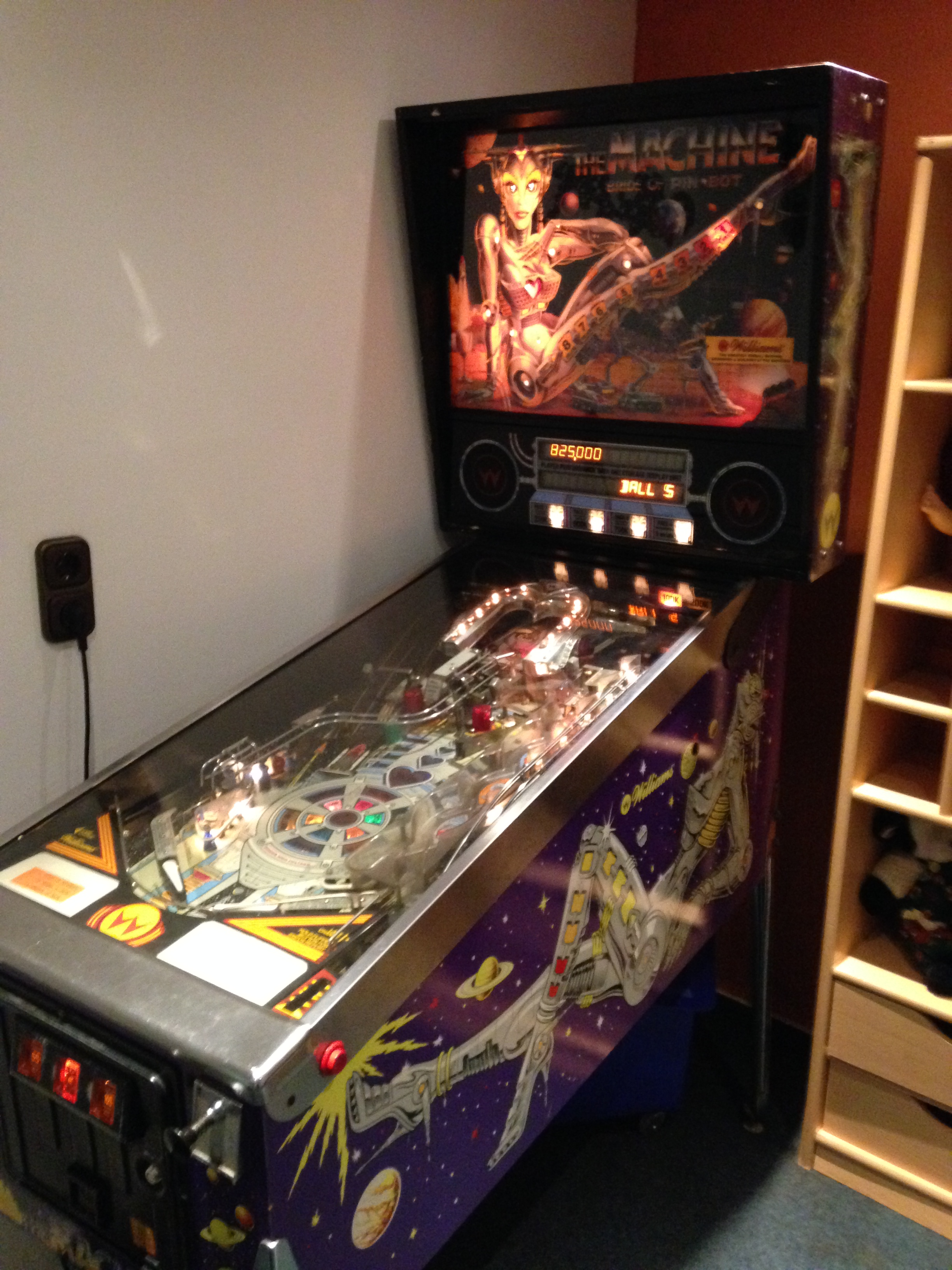
The Machine's cabinet

The game begins with a skillshot.

The primary plot of The Machine revolves around the eponymous female robot (also known as The Machine) that makes up the majority of the playfield. The robot begins the game in a semi-completed state, requiring the player to activate her voice circuits and her eyes, then cause her to metamorphose into a human female. Each of these events occurs as the player makes shots up the left ramp to lock balls. A two-ball multiball mode begins once the player locks two balls as her "eyes", enabling her to "see". During multiball, locking the two balls again begins her metamorphosis into a fully human woman. The Machine reverts to an incomplete robot when multiball ends.

The left ramp feeds into two areas: A pachinko-style raised playfield similar to the one in Pin-Bot, which can drop the ball either back onto the main playfield or into the shooter lane; and an enclosed area containing a rotating box with The Machine's various facial states on each side. The box contains raised guides and holes depending on which face is showing. Beside the left ramp is a saucer containing the Small Wheel. In single-ball mode, shooting this saucer awards a random Small Wheel award, which includes lighting a timed jackpot. During multiball and after the Metamorphosis, the player must lock both balls to spin the Big Wheel, which awards larger random prizes including lighting the center ramp (called the "Heartbeat Ramp") on a timed interval for a shot worth one billion points. (Scoring this shot at least once causes the player's score to be recorded in a special "Billionaire Club" high score list, separate from the main high score table.)

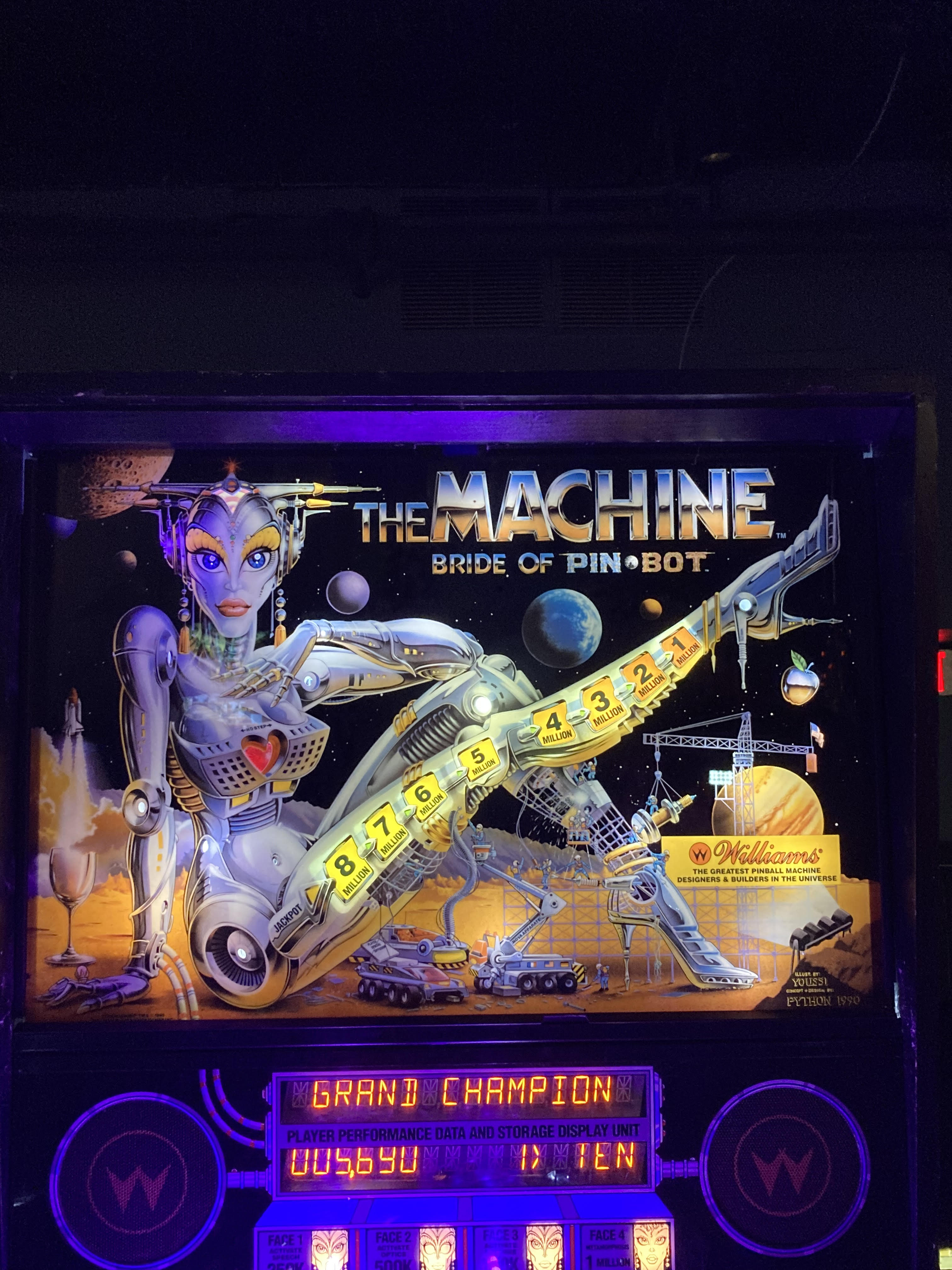
Close up of The Machine's backbox.

Once her voice circuits are activated, The Machine provides spoken feedback to the player on his or her shots. The Machine's voice is provided by Chicago-based singer Stephanie Rogers. Due to the sexual overtones in some of her speech, the game includes a "modesty" setting that prevents some clips from being played. The original synthetic voice of Pin-Bot is also featured in the game.

== Reception ==
Play Meter found it to have one of the most unusual playfields, and the rotating face to be innovative. It was expected to do well in a variety of locations.

== Digital versions ==
The Machine was available in The Pinball Arcade for any platform until June 30, 2018 along with Pin-Bot and Jack-Bot when the WMS license expired. It has also been recreated unofficially for Virtual Pinball and Visual Pinball.

After acquiring the WMS license, Zen Studios released a digital version of the table with optional additional animations and updated physics for Pinball FX on June 30, 2022.

== In popular culture ==
Barenaked Ladies played this machine in the music video for the "Silverball" track from their Silverball album.

Plastilina Mosh featured this machine in the music video of Human Disco Ball, with the outside of the cabinet rethemed as the titular Human Disco Ball.

== Legacy ==
In an early use of a P-ROC controller, a machine was upgraded in 2010 by Dutch Pinball.

The Machine: Bride of Pin-Bot was followed by a sequel, Jack-Bot in 1995.
