= Creature from the Black Lagoon (pinball) =

1992 pinball machine

- Manufacturer: Midway
- Release date: December 1992
- System: Midway WPC (Fliptronics II)
- Players: 1-4
- Design: John Trudeau
- Programming: Jeff Johnson
- Artwork: Kevin O'Connor
- Mechanics: Ernie Pizarro
- Music: Paul Heitsch
- Sound: Paul Heitsch
- Voices: Matt Booty, Paul Heitsch, Jeff Johnson, Allison Quant
- Animation: Scott Slomiany
- Production run: 7,841

Creature from the Black Lagoon is a pinball machine designed by John Trudeau and released by Midway under the Bally brand name. It is licensed from Universal Studios using the movie of the same name. The game is set at a drive-in theater in 1959 and includes five 1950s songs and a hologram of the Creature. Recreations of the game have been released in several video games.

== Design ==
The game is set at the Starlight drive-in theatre, showing the film Creature from the Black Lagoon. The game is set in 1959 which is shown on the number plate of the car; this enabled the game to have a wider choice of music than if it had been set in the same year as the film released, 1954.

=== Songs and audio ===
There are five 1950s songs used in the game. These are:

- "Rock Around the Clock" by Bill Haley and the Comets
- "Get a Job" by The Silhouettes
- "Summertime Blues" by Eddie Cochran
- "Willie and the Hand Jive" by Johnny Otis
- "Red River Rock" (Johnny and the Hurricanes version)

All of the songs are synthesizer-based instrumental versions played by the game's sound hardware. Two further songs were considered, "At the Hop" and "Little Darlin'", but were too cost prohibitive to use. Some of the sound samples from "At the Hop" remained in the ROM, but without a way to activate them on the pinball machine.

The music played during multiball is an original composition by Paul Heitsch, but incorporates a few notes from Grieg's "In the Hall of the Mountain King".

Several of the voices are performed by Paul Heitsch who created the sound package for the game. Matt Booty performed some of the other voices including the guy trying to kiss the girl, who was played by another Williams employee, Allison Quant.

=== Artwork ===
The artwork on the backglass states that the 3D version of the film is used, and 3D glasses are shown twice in the game. The backglass is a tribute to the movie poster, but without using likenesses of actors in the movie. The likeness of the son of the game designer is used for one of the characters on the backglass. The lower resolution on the dot matrix display (DMD) includes a sequence from the movie where the Creature lifts up the girl played by Julie Adams. The brake lights of the cars on the speaker panel are transparent, but have no illumination.

=== Hologram ===
The centerpiece of the table's playfield is a holographic depiction of the titular Creature, illuminated and in motion during multiball play within its "Black Lagoon habitat" (the space beneath the playfield visible through a customized window). The green hologram was produced by Polaroid and is affixed to a metal plate that is divided into three sections which are designed so that the hologram appears to float. A cam behind one section presses against the back of the plate, gently bending the hologram's surface, so that the Creature appears to "ripple" as if underwater and to swipe at the player with its claw. A second motor mounted in the bottom of the cabinet oscillates the light-reflecting mirror, changing the direction of the light source and causing the image of the creature to slowly turn from side to side. The model of the Creature was created by Jerry Pinsler.

The multiball uses two balls, because three balls were found to be too chaotic.

The display shows that the game use "Dot-Mation"; this is the name used for the technology to sync speech with character animation. The game includes a video mode with a "peeping Tom"; this character uses the likeness of another Williams pinball programmer, Dwight Sullivan. "Hi Do Ho" is hidden on the price board of the snack bar shown on the DMD, referencing the girlfriend/future wife of Scott Slomiany, who created the DMD animations.

== Gameplay ==
The main objective of the game is to collect the four letters in F-I-L-M and enable multiball play. Each letter is earned by completing a different objective; the Snack Bar (center scoop) can also give letters as random awards.

F: Shoot the ball into the left K-I-S-S scoop four times. At the start of a ball, the letter can be immediately earned with a properly timed skill shot that loops around the back of the field and comes down the left side.

I: Spot the four menu targets to open the Snack Bar. Targets can be spotted by hitting them, or by shooting the unlit Snack Bar until they have been completed for the first time.

L: Light the P-A-I-D rollovers at the top right of the playfield. One rollover flashes at the start of each ball; hitting it immediately completes all four. The rollovers award a bonus multiplier for each of the first five completions during a single ball, and 5 million per completion afterward.

M: Shoot the ball into the Slide (right scoop). All shots after the first one of the game earn an award that cycles through Mega Menu, Playground Award, and Big Millions (see below).

Once all four letters have been earned, the player can shoot the ball into the left or right scoop to begin a two-ball multiball. The Creature will randomly hide the girl in one of three locations: the left scoop, the Snack Bar, or the right scoop. The player must make the correct shot to find the Creature, then hit the Snack Bar to rescue the girl, and finally hit the Snack Bar again to collect the Jackpot. The jet bumpers must then be hit a specified number of times to light the Super Jackpot, which is worth double the current Jackpot and can be collected by shooting the Snack Bar one more time. The entire cycle then starts again, with the Jackpot doubled as long as it has not yet reached 250 million.

The Jackpot is set to 40 million at the start of the game and can be increased by hitting the jet bumpers, to a maximum of 1 billion. During multiball, shots to the left ramp feed into a small whirlpool above the right flipper, adding letters to the word CREATURE for every revolution; once the word is completed, the playfield multiplier is increased by one, to a maximum of four. This multiplier affects all shot values, including Jackpots and Super Jackpots, and reverts to one after multiball ends.

If one ball drains without a Jackpot being scored, the player is given 12 seconds to shoot the Snack Bar and restart multiball.

Additional scoring modes or methods include:

Snack Bar: Gives a random award when lit.

Mega Menu: The four menu targets are lit, awarding 5, 10, 15, and 20 million. This mode lasts for 20 seconds or until all targets are hit.

Playground Award: The game activates one of the following three modes at random.

- Unlimited Millions: The left ramp awards points for 24 seconds, starting at 3 million and increasing by this amount per shot.
- Fighter Jets: Jet bumpers award 1 million per hit for 25 seconds.
- Intermission Time: Both ramps award 5 million per shot for 15 seconds.

Big Millions: The right ramp awards points for 10 seconds, starting at 5 million and increasing by this amount per shot.

Move Your Car: After a certain number of center shots, a hurry-up countdown begins, decreasing rapidly from 8 million to 2 million. Making the center shot awards the points and starts a 15-second timer, during which the player can hit the shot up to three more times and collect increasing multiples of the value (double, triple, quadruple). Each shot is accompanied by a graphic of an irate patron deploying various weaponry (dynamite, rocket launcher, flamethrower, nuclear bomb) against a van that has blocked his view of the movie screen. Once the mode ends, the van drives away on its own, completely unharmed by any of these attacks.

Double Feature Combo: Shoot the left ramp several times in succession. The first shot sets the combo value at 500,000, and each successive shot doubles it to a maximum of 16 million. The value is collected by hitting the center shot before it times out.

Snack Attack: After shooting the right ramp four times, a hurry-up value begins to count down from 20 million. Shooting the Snack Bar awards the remaining points.

Video Mode: After shooting the right ramp eight times, either the left or right scoop lights up to begin Video Mode, changed by hitting the slingshots. In this mode, a peeping Tom appears, and the player must hit the flipper buttons to punch him as he dodges back and forth.

Super Scoring: After shooting the right ramp 12 times, a 12-second timer starts. Shoot the Snack Bar scoop to begin Super Scoring, which activates Mega Menu, Big Millions, Snack Attack, Unlimited Millions, and Intermission Time scoring modes all at once. This mode lasts for 25 seconds.

Super Creature Feature: During Super Scoring, shoot the ball into the left ramp within the first 10 seconds to divert it into the whirlpool. The first spin is worth 5 million, and the value increases by this amount per spin to a maximum of 35 million, after which no more points are awarded.

== Reception ==
An article in The Flipside found the game almost perfect, with two weak spots: the saucer and the whirlpool could be problematic if the machine was misaligned.

A review in Pinball Player found it to be an enjoyable game with good use of the sound and display systems; the flashlamps towards the sides were too bright in a darkened environment.

== Digital versions ==
This table is included in Williams Pinball Classics (2001) for PC.

Creature from the Black Lagoon was available as a licensed table for The Pinball Arcade on several platforms from 2012 until June 30, 2018. Due to music licensing issues "Summertime Blues" and "Get a Job" were not included. In addition, two Easter Eggs which refer to Mortal Kombat are disabled since the game's Family Mode is permanently activated in the Pinball Arcade incarnation.

The table was released for Pinball FX3 on October 29, 2019 as part of the Universal Monsters pack; with a remastered version released for Pinball FX on March 31, 2022. Both versions omit all of the music tracks except for "Red River Rock" due to music licensing issues; they also have alterations to the Cadillac and '57 Chevy on the playfield.
