= Black Rose (pinball) =

1992 pinball machine

- Manufacturer: Midway
- Release date: July 1992
- System: Williams WPC (Fliptronics II)
- Design: John Trudeau
- Programming: Brian Eddy
- Artwork: Pat McMahon
- Mechanics: Ernie Pizarro, John Krutsch
- Music: Paul Heitsch
- Sound: Paul Heitsch
- Voices: Alison Quant
- Animation: Scott Slomiany
- Production run: 3,746

Black Rose is a pinball machine designed by John Trudeau and Brian Eddy and produced by the Midway subsidiary of Williams (released under the Bally name). The game is set in the golden age of piracy and features the titular Black Rose as a pirate captain. Black Rose is not based on a specific historical figure, and the game calls her "Queen of the High Seas".

== Design and layout ==
The concept of the game began with the designers love of swashbuckling pirate films such as Captain Blood and The Sea Hawk, but with the twist of making the pirate captain female.

The backglass shows Black Rose in the foreground, opposing a pirate resembling Blackbeard. The game designer John Trudeau, art designer Pat McMahon, and Bally art director Greg Freres are shown as pirates. The voice of Black Rose is Alison Quant, a Bally office employee.

The central feature of this game is the cannon which can rotate and allows the player to launch a ball from it by using the fire button on the lockdown bar; this button covers a pressure sensitive membrane switch. This incorporates a mechanism similar to the fixed catapults on Big Guns and Taxi. Initial prototypes were designed with a clear plastic window from the cannon to the back of the playfield; this was abandoned after seeing how much it restricted players view of the main playfield, which would have become worse over time as this window was worn by the ball. The final design has the end of the cannon rise from the playfield when it is loaded with a ball, and fire the ball on the level of the playfield. During production factory adjustments were difficult to get this level with the playfield, and the mechanism was never used in another pinball machine.

The designer considered using black pinballs, but decided to use standard pinballs.

The game includes a pirate's cove at the bottom left of the playfield which is a dead-end that ball are returned back from. There are three ramps including the whirlpool ramp on the right which has a looping wireform to return the ball, and the side ramp which at times raises to reveal Davy Jones' locker. There are nine standup targets in three groups of three just off the centre-line of the playfield. The most visible wireform extends the length of the playfield and is reached from hitting the broadside at the very back of the playfield; this always safely returns the ball to the right flipper. This shot is one of the longest on any pinball machine.

== Gameplay ==
The game has three flippers, including an upper right flipper; there is a fire button on the lockdown bar, but its use is optional. The primary objective of the game is to sink ships with the score awarded for sinking each ship increasing incrementally. By spelling L-O-C-K on the rollovers or from hitting the pirate's cove a 2 or 3 multiball is started where letters for S-I-N-K S-H-I-P can be collected and are prominently displayed on the playfield. If successful, then after draining to a single ball the player can shoot Davy Jones' locket with the upper flipper to load the cannon and sink a ship by hitting the broadside with it.

When SINK SHIP is not lit a series of awards can be obtained from the locker instead, the first of which is most important and requires the broadside shot to be hit as many times as possible in a short period of time, with the score doubling for each hit.

A series of seven short modes or score is available from the broadside, which include a 2 ball multiball, and three video modes; and after all seven, a jackpot. The video modes are all pirate themed:

- Walk the Plank - after being thrown in the sea swim very rapidly to escape a shark and reach a desert island
- Knife Throw - throw a knife to explode a barrel
- Swing from the Riggings - swing on a rope and land on the enemy ship

This is the first pinball machine to include three video modes. Players are also encouraged to hit the whirlpool ramp a number of times in succession to earn an extra ball.

== Reception ==
An article in The Flipside found it fun to play, but with a fatal flaw of the scoring from sinking ships overwhelming everything else and making it a one shot game.

== Digital versions ==
It is one of four tables included in Williams Pinball Classics (2001) by Encore for Microsoft Windows.

Black Rose released as a licensed table for The Pinball Arcade on several platforms in April 2014, and was available until June 30, 2018, when all Williams tables were removed due to licensing issues.

It released for Pinball FX3 on December 4, 2018; additional animations were added including a compass that points in the direction of the ball. A remastered version released for Pinball FX on March 31, 2022.

== Black Rose: Skull & Bones ==
A conversion kit was released in 2023 by Cardona pinball. This kit includes new CPU and audio boards, translite, LCD, and software.

The new game is set on a ship called the Black Rose, under the command of Captain Maria Cortez De La Mancha. Six main modes can be played, and to play the mutiny wizard mode all of these and some other side modes need to be completed. The three video modes from the original game are not incorporated into these game rules.
