= Lost World (pinball) =

1978 pinball machine

- Release date: August 1978
- Design: Gary Gayton
- Artwork: Paul Faris
- Production run: 10,330

Lost World is a pinball machine released by Bally in 1977.

== Design ==
Lost World is the first pinball machine that uses electronic sounds to replace chimes. It is also the first machine that uses a backglass produced by the four-color process.

The backglass depicts a hybrid of a dinosaur/dragon, a gargoyle-winged hero, and a scantily dressed woman. The border was intended to be a Gothic style carving. Artist Paul Faris stated that the faces of these two figures were based on himself and his wife.

The game is the first to use electronic sounds, with the soundboard replacing chimes used in earlier machines; these sounds are played from a speaker under the cabinet.

== Gameplay ==
A Lost World cabinet

The player can hit the A-B-C-D-E-F targets to light various other targets, including the special when all six are hit. The player can also hit the two eject holes to increase their value and light the special.

== Reception ==
Roger Sharpe in Play Meter rated this machine at 3.75/4, and appreciated the artwork.

RePlay magazine noted that location testing indicated that this would be a successful game.

== Digital version ==
Lost World is one of four tables in Williams Pinball Classics released in 2001 by Encore for Windows.
