= Williams Pinball Classics (2001) =

2001 video game

- Developer: Redoubt Ltd.
- Publisher: Encore Software
- Platform: Windows
- Release: September 29, 2001
- Genre: Pinball

Williams Pinball Classics is a 2001 pinball video game developed by Redoubt for Encore Software.

It features the first commercial digital recreations of four Williams pinball tables: Creature from the Black Lagoon, Black Rose, Tales of the Arabian Nights, and Lost World.

== History ==
Rare released two games for the Nintendo Entertainment System based on physical pinball tables, Pin Bot in 1990, and High Speed in 1992; and Atari released Pinball Jam, also in 1992. Other than a crude version of The Getaway released for the Game Boy in 1995 no further licensed Williams pinball games were made until this one. Unlike these earlier games, Williams Pinball Classics features all the artwork from the original playfields.

== Gameplay ==
Each table has a single fixed viewpoint, with the DMD shown between the instruction cards at the bottom of the table. There are 3 difficulty settings which change the pitch of the table. Nudging is possible from the front or either side. The game simulates the rules of the four physical tables it is based on, but changes the display and adds a ball save on Lost World.

== Reception ==
Reception

Review scores
Publication	Score
Computer Gaming World	7/10
GameSpot	7.7/10
Gamezilla	76%

GameSpot found the physics to be generally good, but with some issues when entering or exiting a sinkhole. They lamented that tables such as The Addams Family or The Twilight Zone were not included. Lost World was found to be a bit boring compared to 1980s and 1990s pinball designs. Both Tales of the Arabian Nights and Creature from the Black Lagoon had visibility problems, especially at the back of the table, but Black Rose was better received. While they would have liked a better game, it was still favourably reviewed due to no directly competing products, only comparing it with Pro Pinball.

Computer Gaming World found the tables to be mixed, but enjoyed the hologram on Creature from the Black Lagoon, and the cannon on Black Rose.

In a review for Gamezilla, the reviewer favoured Lost World because of nostalgia for a similar table and found the feel of the physics of this game to be similar to that. A see-through flipper anomaly was found at higher resolutions, but otherwise the graphics were found to be acceptable.

Reviewing a beta version GameRoom found the score displays to be unobtrusive and easy to glance at during play.

== Legacy ==
Several games based on Williams tables followed from other developers; FarSight Studios with Pinball Hall of Fame: The Williams Collection in 2008 and The Pinball Arcade from 2012, and Zen Studios with a series of games beginning with Pinball FX3 in 2018.
