= Pinball =

Arcade entertainment machine

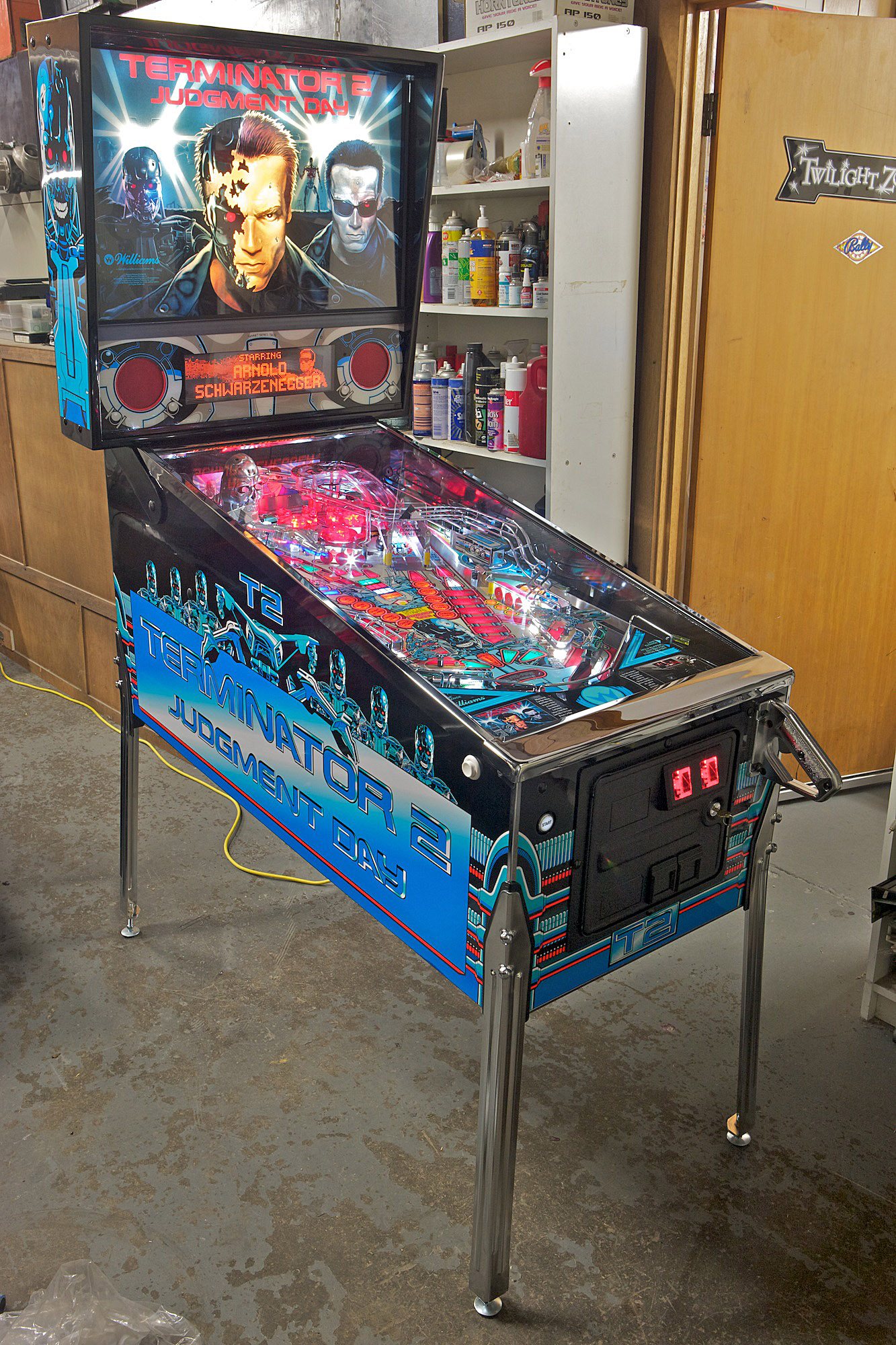
Terminator 2: Judgment Day, 1991 pinball machine designed by Steve Ritchie

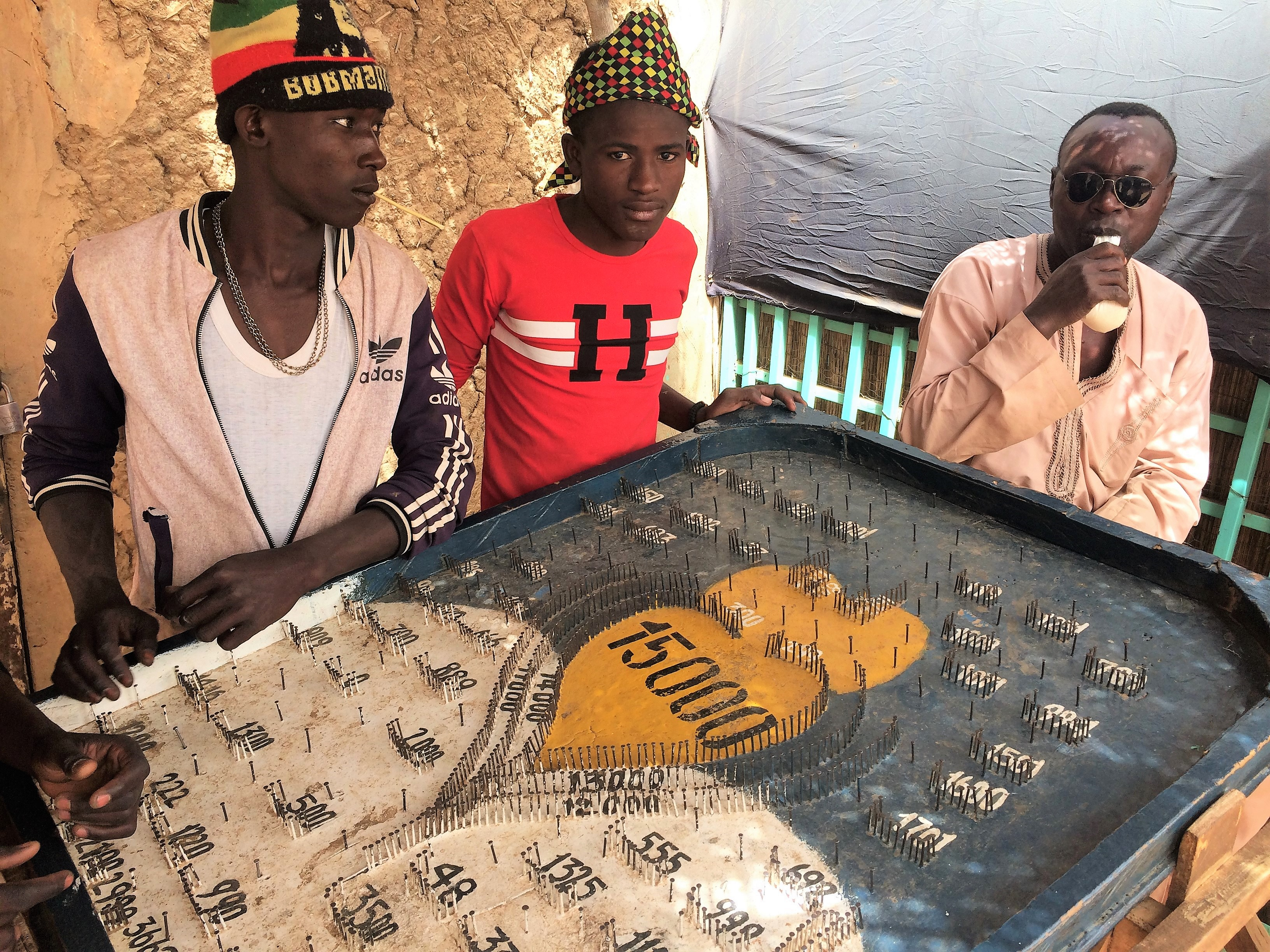
Boys with a local pinball game in Filingué, Niger

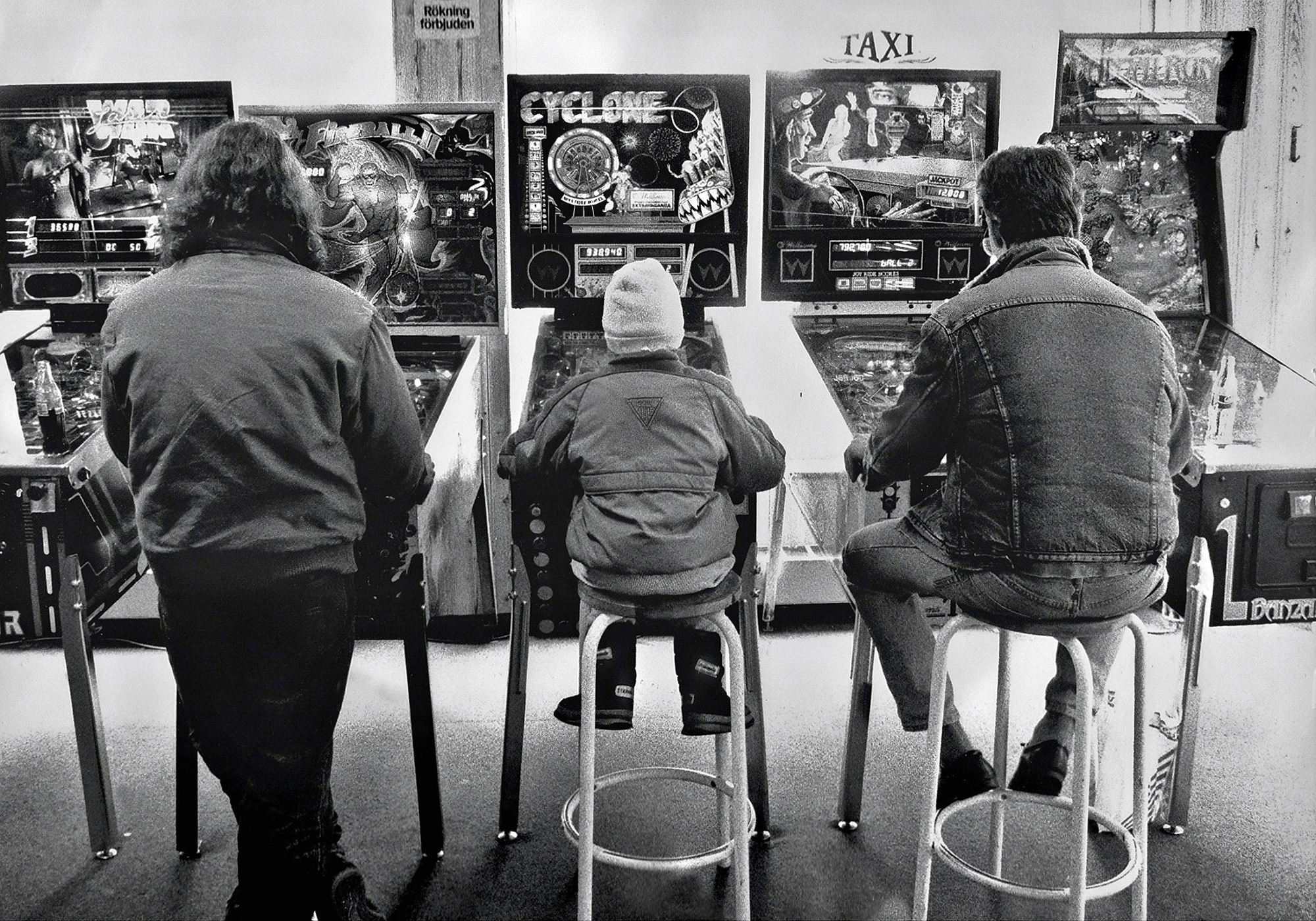
Pinball is played by all ages. Pinball hall in Malmö 1989.

Pinball games are a family of games in which a ball is propelled into a specially designed table where it bounces off various obstacles, scoring points either en-route or when it comes to rest. Historically the board was studded with nails called 'pins' and had hollows or pockets which scored points if the ball came to rest in them. Today, pinball is most commonly an arcade game in which the ball is fired into a specially designed cabinet known as a pinball machine, hitting various lights, bumpers, ramps, and other targets depending on its design.

The game's object is generally to score as many points as possible by hitting these targets and making various shots with flippers before the ball is lost. Most pinball machines use one ball per turn, except during special multi-ball phases, and the game ends when the ball(s) from the last turn are lost. The biggest pinball machine manufacturers historically include Bally Manufacturing, Gottlieb, Williams Electronics and Stern Pinball.

Currently active pinball machine manufacturers include Stern Pinball, Jersey Jack Pinball, American Pinball, Chicago Gaming Company, Pinball Brothers, Dutch Pinball, Spooky Pinball and Multimorphic, Inc., as well as several smaller boutique manufacturers.

== History ==
The history of pinball machines varies by the source. These machines definitely arrived in recognizable form prior to World War II. The opinions on the relevance of the earlier prototypes varies depending on the definition of the pinball machine, for example:

- Some researchers, like Steven L. Kent, declare that the history begins in the 1930s when Gottlieb's Baffle Ball and Raymond Maloney's Ballyhoo were manufactured in large quantities;
- Roger Sharpe, a pinball historian, asserts that the origin lies in Montague Redgrave's patents for the spring plunger and playfield bells (1871);
- Richard M. Bueschel traces the history way back to the 1500s when the table versions of garden bowling games were invented.

=== Pre-modern: Development of outdoor and tabletop ball games ===
The origins of pinball are intertwined with the history of many other games. Games played outdoors by rolling balls or stones on a grass course, such as bocce or bowls, eventually evolved into various local ground billiards games played by hitting the balls with sticks and propelling them at targets, often around obstacles. Croquet, golf and pall-mall eventually derived from ground billiards variants.

The evolution of outdoor games finally led to indoor versions that could be played on a table, such as billiards, or on the floor of a pub, like bowling and shuffleboard. The tabletop versions of these games became the ancestors of modern pinball.

=== Late 18th century: Spring launcher invented ===
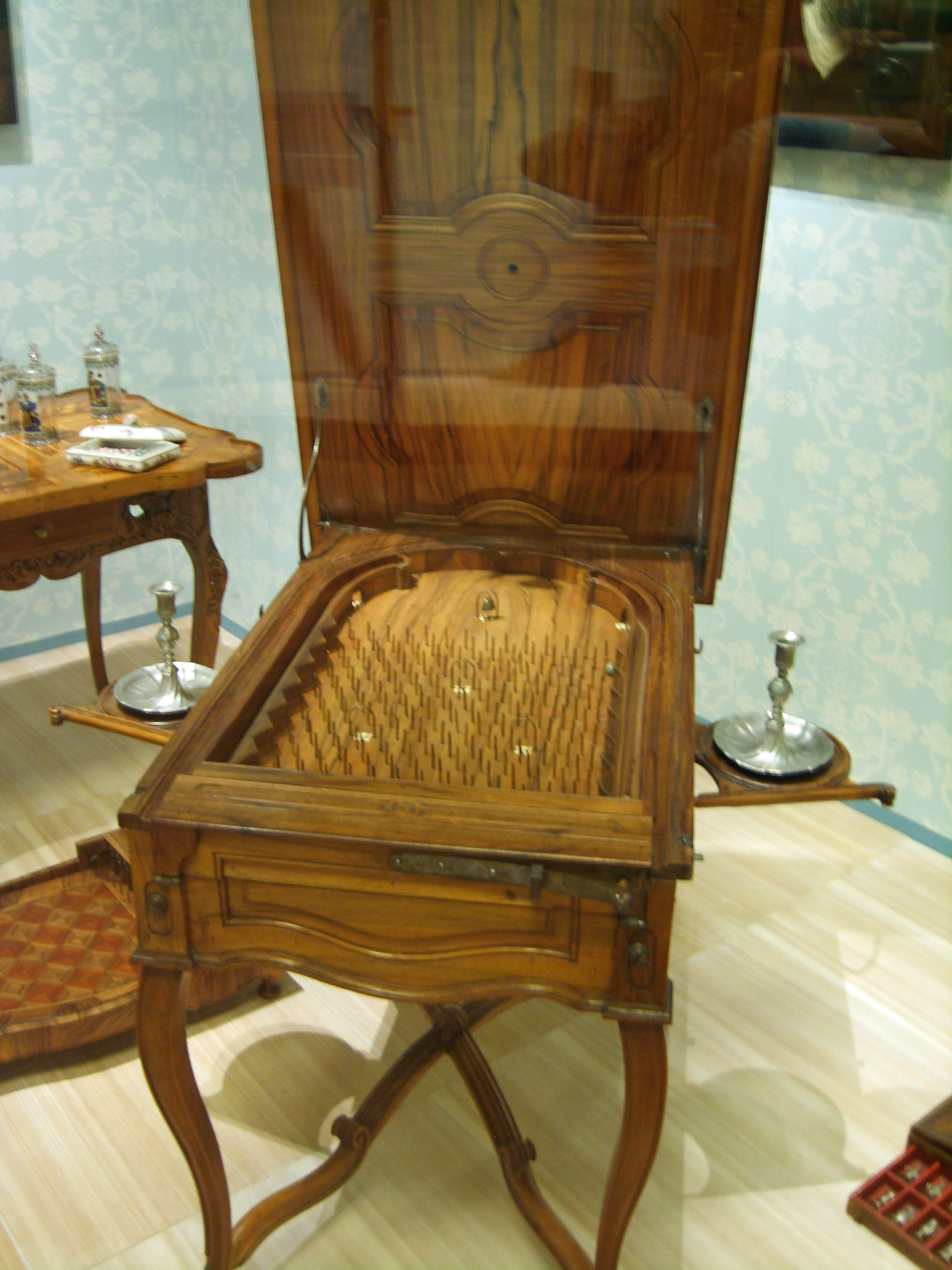
Billard japonais, Alsace, France c. 1750–70. It already has a spring mechanism to propel the ball, 100 years before Montague Redgrave's patent.

In France, during the long 1643–1715 reign of Louis XIV, billiard tables were narrowed, with wooden pins or skittles at one end of the table, and players would shoot balls with a stick or cue from the other end, in a game inspired as much by bowling as billiards. Pins took too long to reset when knocked down, so they were eventually fixed to the table, and holes in the table's bed became the targets. Players could ricochet balls off the pins to achieve the more challenging scorable holes. A standardized version of the game eventually became known as bagatelle.

Somewhere between the 1750s and 1770s, the bagatelle variant Billard japonais, or Japanese billiards in English, was invented in Western Europe, despite its misnomer. Also called Stosspudel, it used thin metal pins and replaced the cue at the player's end of the table with a coiled spring and a plunger. The player shot balls up the inclined playfield toward the scoring targets using this plunger, a device that remains in use in pinball to this day, and the game was also directly ancestral to pachinko.

=== 1869: Spring launchers become mainstream ===
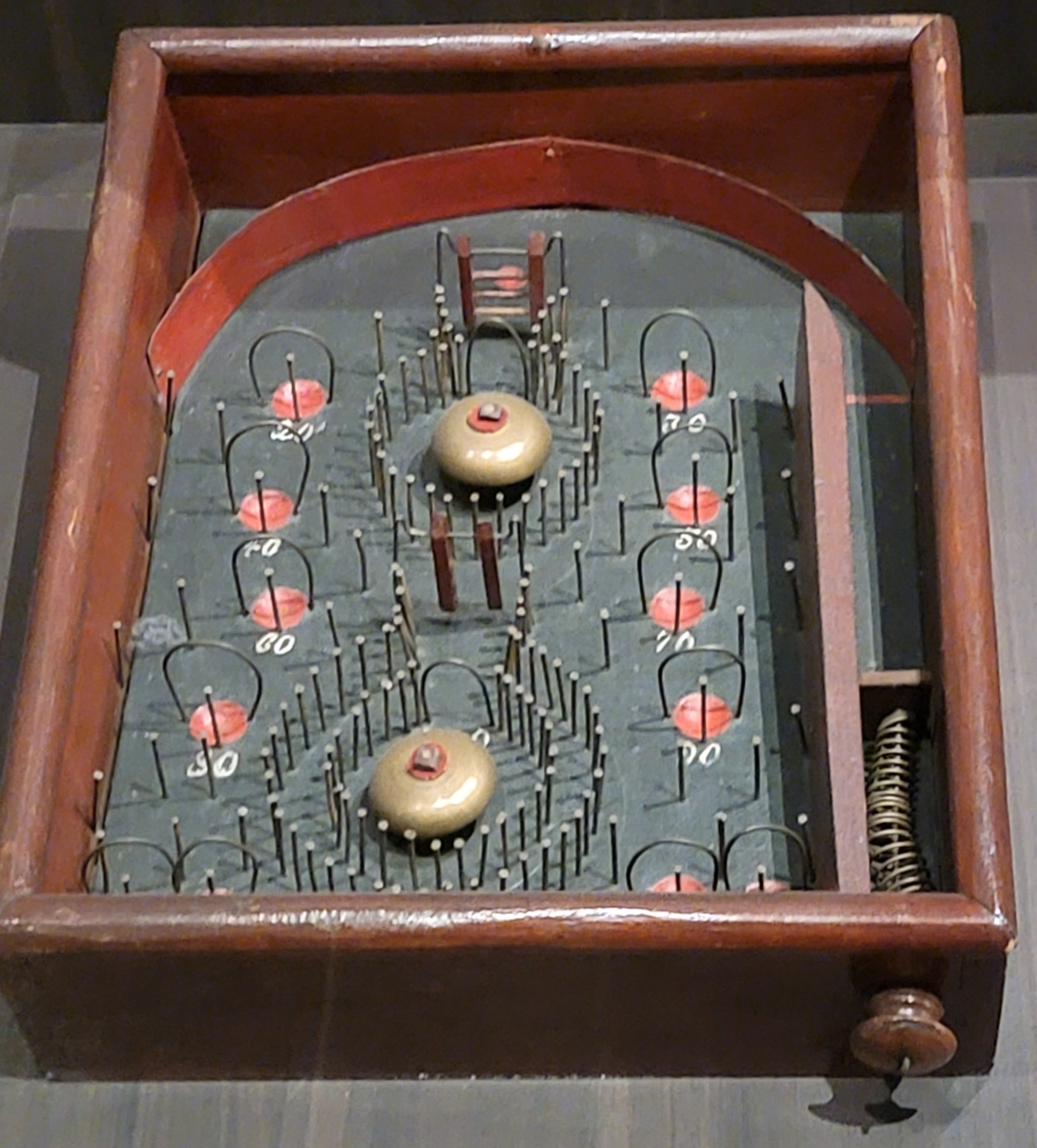
Patent model for U.S. Patent #115,357

In 1869, British inventor Montague Redgrave settled in the United States and manufactured bagatelle tables in Cincinnati, Ohio. In 1871 Redgrave was granted U.S. Patent #115,357 for his "Improvements in Bagatelle", another name for the spring launcher that was first introduced in Billard japonais. The game also shrank in size to fit atop a bar or counter. The balls became marbles and the wickets became small metal pins. Redgrave's popularization of the spring launcher and innovations in game design (playfield bells) are acknowledged as the birth of pinball in its modern form. The Redgrave Bagatelle was produced until 1927.

=== 1931: Coin operation introduced ===
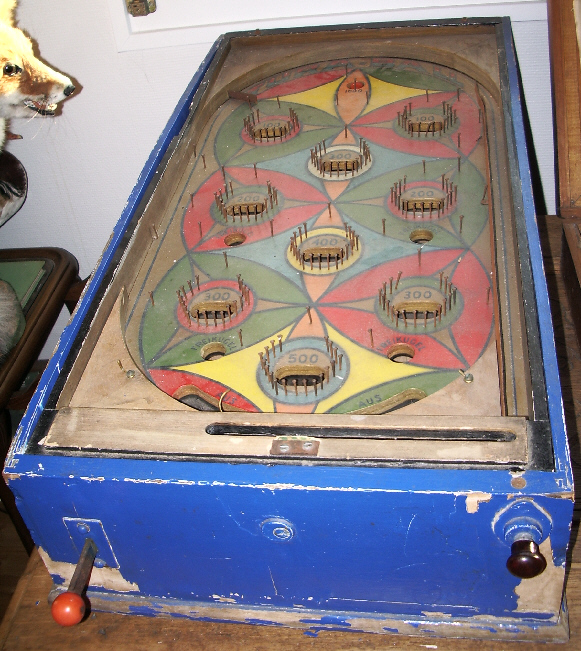
An early pinball game without flippers, c. 1932

By the 1930s, manufacturers were producing coin-operated versions of bagatelles, now known as "marble games" or "pin games". The table was under glass and used Montague Redgrave's plunger device to propel the ball into the upper playfield. In January of 1931 Whiffle was introduced in Youngstown, Ohio. The Whiffle is referred to as the birth of pinball by the IPDB. Later, that same year, David Gottlieb's Baffle Ball became the first major hit of the coin-operated era. Selling for $17.50, the game dispensed five, seven, or ten balls for a penny. At its peak, Gottlieb produced 400 Baffle Ball machines per day and establishing the company as the first major manufacturer of pinball machines.

In 1932, Gottlieb distributor Raymond Moloney found it hard to obtain more Baffle Ball units to sell. In his frustration he founded Lion Manufacturing to produce a game of his design, Ballyhoo, named after a popular magazine. The game became a smash hit. Its larger playfield and ten pockets made it more challenging than Baffle Ball, selling 50,000 units in 7 months. Moloney eventually changed the name of his company to Bally to reflect the success of this game. These early machines were relatively small, mechanically simple and designed to sit on a counter or bar top. 1932 also saw the earliest version of flippers used on a pinball machine with the Hercules Novelty Company's Double-Shuffle. Rock-Ola also experimented with player-controlled pinball; their 1932 Juggle Ball had a rod that players could use to manipulate the ball's direction.

=== 1933: Electrification and active bumpers introduced ===
The 1930s saw major advances in pinball design with the introduction of electrification. Pacific Amusements in Los Angeles, California produced Contact in 1933, which had an electrically powered solenoid to propel the ball out of a bonus hole in the middle of the playfield. Another solenoid rang a bell to reward the player. Contact's designer, Harry Williams, eventually formed his own company, Williams Manufacturing, in 1944. Other manufacturers quickly followed suit with similar features. Electric lights soon became standard on all pinball games, to attract players.

By the end of 1932, approximately 150 companies manufactured pinball machines, most of them in Chicago, Illinois. Chicago has been the center of pinball manufacturing ever since. Competition was strong, and by 1934, only 14 companies remained.

During World War II, all major manufacturers of coin-operated games turned to manufacturing for the war effort. Some, like Williams, bought old games from operators and refurbished them, adding new artwork with a patriotic theme. At the end of the war, a generation of Americans looked for amusement in bars and malt shops, and pinball saw another golden age. Improvements such as the tilt-sensing mechanism and the awarding of free games (replays) appeared.

=== 1947: Flippers widely introduced ===
Gottlieb's Humpty Dumpty, introduced in 1947, was the first game to add electromechanical player-controlled flippers to keep the ball in play longer. The low-power flippers required three pairs around the playfield to get the ball to the top.

Triple Action from Genco was the first game to feature just two flippers at the bottom of the playfield. Unlike in modern machines, the flippers faced outwards. These flippers were made more powerful by the addition of a DC (direct current) power supply. These innovations were some of many by designer Steve Kordek.

The first game to feature the familiar dual-inward-facing-flipper design was Gottlieb's Just 21 released in January 1950. However, the flippers were rather far apart to allow for a turret ball shooter at the bottom center of the playfield. Another 1950 Gottlieb game, Spot Bowler, was the first with inward-facing flippers placed close together.

The post-war era was dominated by Gottlieb. Game designers Wayne Neyens and Ed Krynski, with artist Leroy Parker, produced games that collectors consider some of the best classic pinball machines.

=== 1970s: Solid-state electronics and digital displays introduced ===
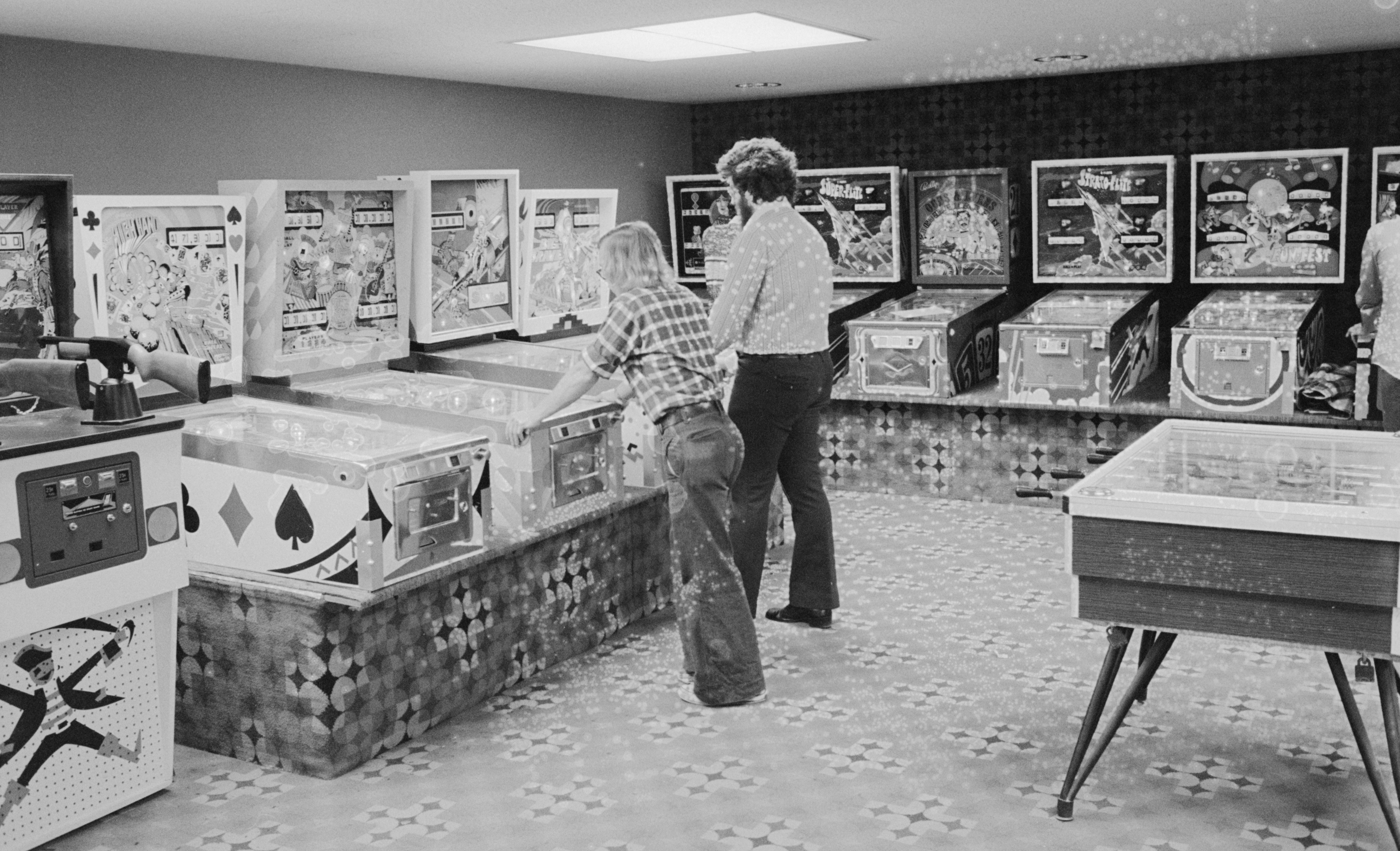
People playing pinball at the University of Maryland's Student Union in 1975

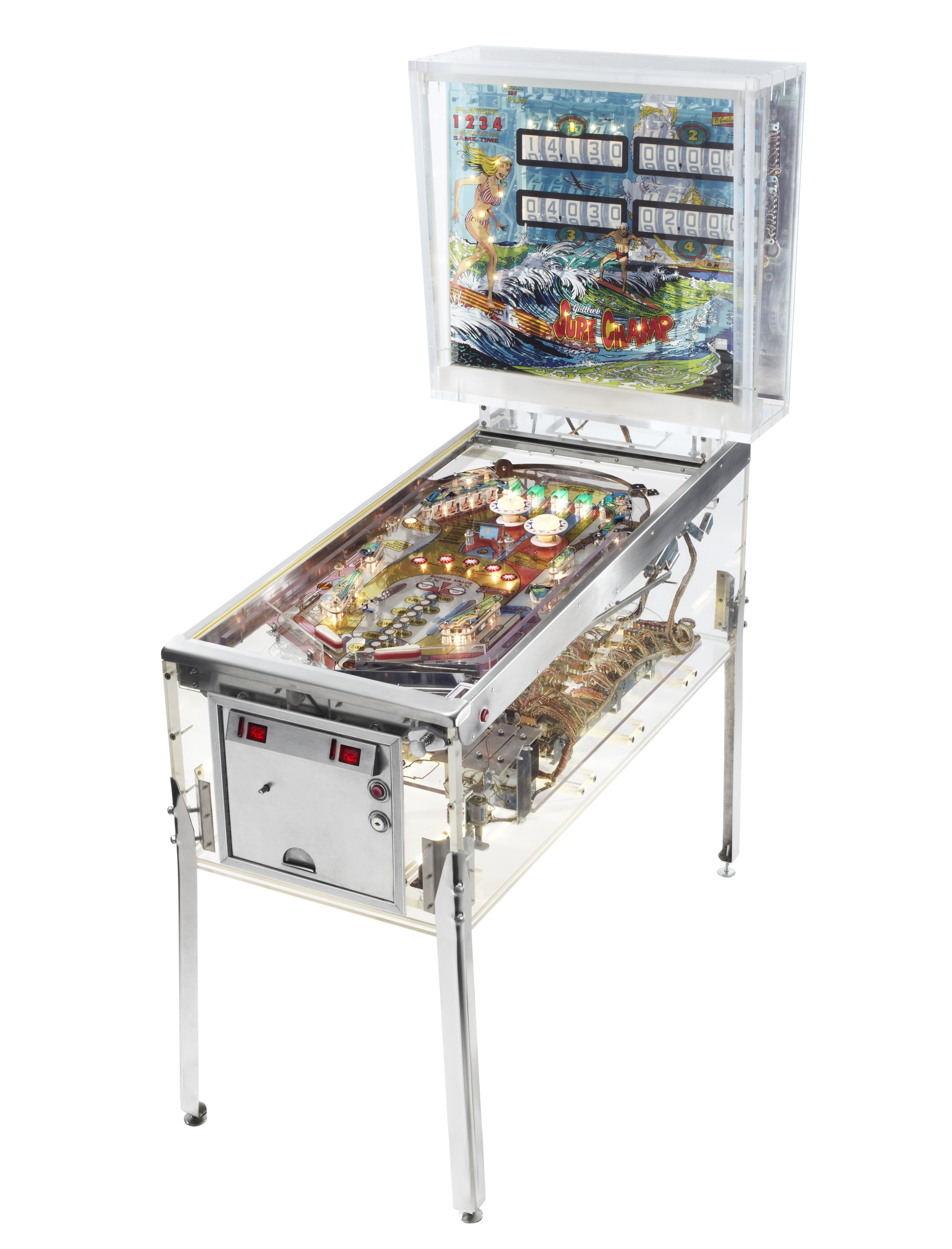
A clear-walled electromechanical pinball machine created by the Pacific Pinball Museum to illustrate the inner workings of a typical pinball machine

The introduction of microprocessors brought pinball into the realm of electronic gaming. The electromechanical relays and scoring reels that drove games in the 1950s and 1960s were replaced in the 1970s with circuit boards and digital displays.

In late 1973 the pinball industry, including Ross Schier of Bally, was skeptical about the use of microprocessors in pinball machines. Despite this, Dave Nutting Associates began to work under contract from Bally on the possibility in the last few weeks of 1973.

Cyan Engineering under Atari began work on an electronic pinball project around February 1974.

The first advert suggesting use of a microprocessor in a pinball machine was published by Intel in March 1974.

In May or June 1974 Atari had an event for employees and their families where a converted Bally El Toro (1972) machine was on display which had been attempted to run on a microprocessor, but didn’t function properly. By the summer of 1974 this machine was working as intended, and left beside a company cafeteria where it was played. This also used an Intellec-4 which was in cart beside it. Later in 1974 five Bally Delta Queen’s (1974) were similarly converted and the first one was shown in October/ November 1974 at the MOA trade show, with a fully working version shown at a conference in April 1975.

Dave Nutting Associates acquired a development kit for the Intel 4040 microprocessor and used a Bally Flicker (1974) pinball machine to experiment with. The circuit board used inside this machine was dubbed the “Bally brain”. A clock was reversed engineered for use as a 6 segment scoring display. The game was programmed using about 500 lines of assembly code. On September 26, 1974, they demonstrated this table to Bally running using a microprocessor, the implementation of which was subsequently patented. Bally began to develop their own version of this, converting an EM Boomerang (1975) which lead to them filing a patent in November 1975, six months later than the one filed by David Nutting. Bally later acquired Dave Nutting Associates and by the time they were granted in 1978 and 1980 held both patents. Universal Research Laboratories manufactured circuit boards for Bally pinball machines, and then reverse engineered these for Stern (who bought Universal Research Laboratories in October 1977), who were then sued by Bally. Stern agreed a license with Bally for this technology, and by September 1981 had paid $700,000 in royalties. Bally took legal action against Williams and Gottlieb in 1980 for breaching these patents. As defendants Williams and Gottlieb eventually won the case due to the judge ruling that the invention was “obvious”.

The first working pinball machine using a microprocessor is Flicker. Bally soon followed that up with a solid-state version of Bow and Arrow in the same year with a microprocessor board that was also used in eight other machines through 1978, which included Eight Ball, the machine that held the sales record from 1977 to 1993.

The first commercial solid-state (SS) pinball is considered by some to be Mirco Games' The Spirit of '76 (1976), which sold in very limited quantities. At almost the same time Allied Leisure released Rock On which Roger Sharpe considers to be a hybrid EM/SS game, and the 4 player version Dyn O'Mite (including and named after Jimmie Walker's catchphrase) had been shown to distributors in April 1976. The first mainstream solid-state game was Bally's Freedom in December 1976 with Williams' Hot Tip following nine months later; all of these games used a Motorola 6800. This new technology led to a boom for Williams and Bally, who attracted more players with games featuring more complex rules, digital sound effects, and speech. Atari released The Atarians at a similar time to Bally's Freedom, but remained a very minor player in the pinball market, exiting it shortly after.

The video game boom of the 1980s signaled the end of the boom for pinball. Arcades replaced rows of pinball machines with video games like 1978's Space Invaders, 1979's Asteroids, 1980's Pac-Man, and 1981's Galaga. These earned significantly greater profits than the pinball machines of the day while simultaneously requiring less maintenance. Bally, Williams, and Gottlieb continued to make pinball machines while also manufacturing video games in much higher numbers.

Many of the larger companies were acquired by, or merged with, other companies. Chicago Coin was purchased by the Stern family in 1977, who brought the company into the digital era as Stern Enterprises, which closed its doors in the mid-1980s. Bally exited the pinball business in 1988 and sold their assets to Williams, who subsequently used the Bally trademark from then on for about half of their pinball releases.

While the video game craze of the late 1970s and early 1980s dealt a severe blow to pinball revenue, it sparked the industry's creative talents. All companies involved tried to take advantage of the new solid-state technology to improve player appeal of pinball and win back former players from video games. Some of this creativity resulted in landmark designs and features still present today. Some of these include speech, such as Williams' Gorgar; ramps for the ball to travel around, such as Williams' Space Shuttle; "multiball", used on Williams' Firepower; multi-level games like Gottlieb's Black Hole and Williams' Black Knight; and blinking chase lights, as used on Bally's Xenon. Although these novel features did not win back players as the manufacturers had hoped, they changed players' perception of pinball for decades.

=== 1980s and 1990s: Pinball in the digital age ===
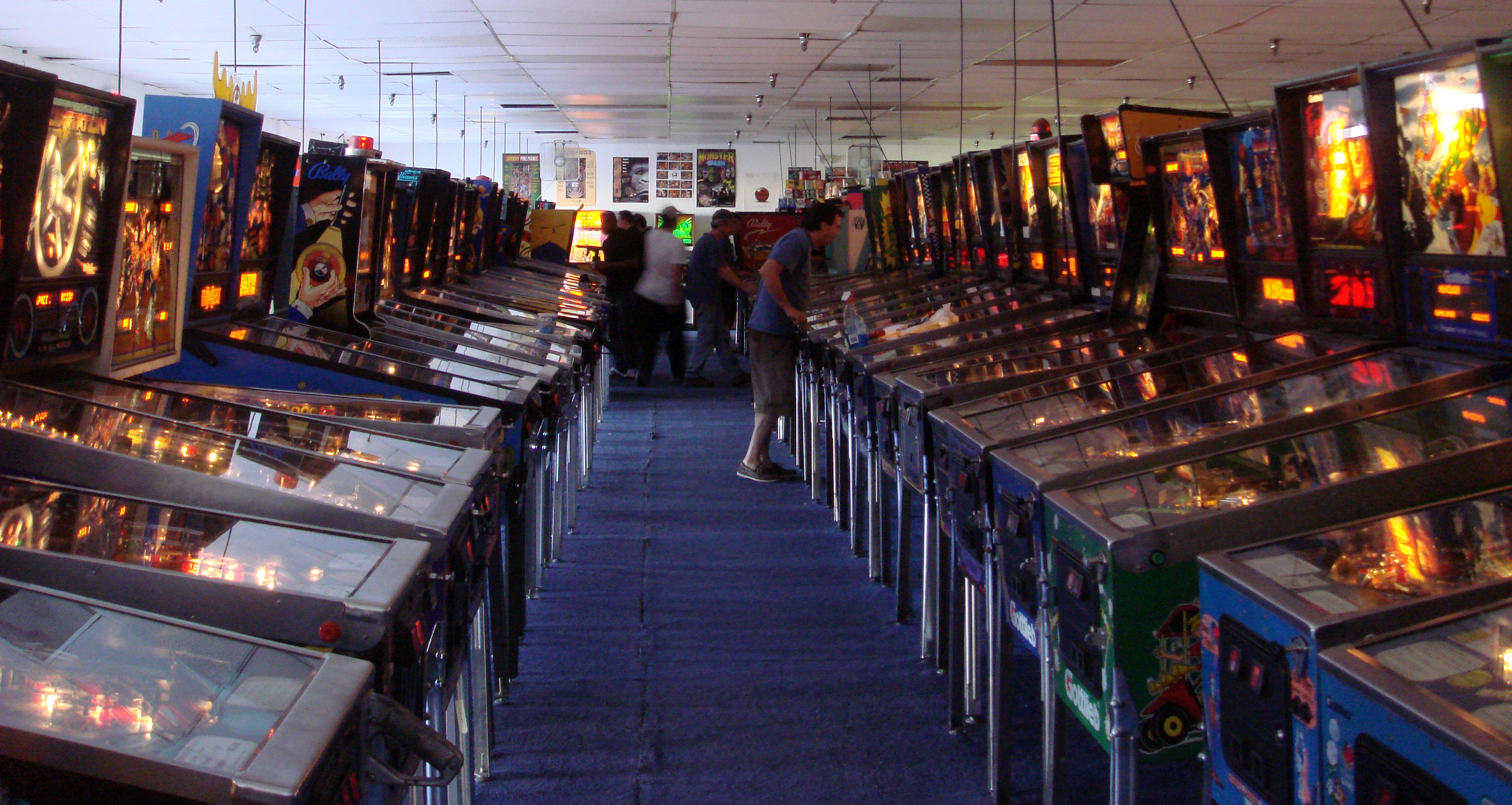
A row of pinball machines at the Pinball Hall of Fame in Las Vegas, Nevada

During the 1980s, pinball manufacturers navigated technology changes while going through changes of ownership and mergers: Gottlieb was sold to Premier Technologies, and Bally merged with Williams. The video game crash of 1983 made the manufacturers refocus on their pinball sales. A trend started of pinball becoming increasingly elaborate to use more computing resources, following video games.

Games in the latter half of the 1980s such as High Speed started incorporating full soundtracks, elaborate light shows and backbox animations - a radical change from the previous decade's electromechanical games. Although pinball continued to compete with video games in arcades, pinball held a premium niche, since the video games of the time could not reproduce an accurate pinball experience.

By the first years of the 1990s, pinball had made a strong comeback and saw new sales highs. Some new manufacturers entered the field, such as Capcom Pinball and Alvin G. and Company, founded by Alvin Gottlieb, son of David Gottlieb. Gary Stern, the son of Williams co-founder Sam Stern, founded Data East Pinball with funding from Data East Japan.

The games from Williams now dominated the industry, with complicated mechanical devices and more elaborate display and sound systems attracting new players to the game. Licensing popular movies and icons of the day became a staple for pinball, with Bally/Williams' The Addams Family from 1992 hitting a modern sales record of 20,270 machines. In 1994, Williams commemorated this benchmark with a limited edition of 1,000 Addams Family Gold pinball machines, featuring gold-colored trim and updated software with new game features. Other notable popular licenses included Indiana Jones: The Pinball Adventure and Star Trek: The Next Generation. Expanding markets in Europe and Asia helped fuel the revival of interest. Pat Lawlor was a designer, working for Williams until their exit from the industry in 1999. About a year later, Lawlor returned to the industry, starting his own company, working in conjunction with Stern Pinball to produce new games.

The end of the 1990s saw another downturn in the industry, with Gottlieb, Capcom, and Alvin G. closing by the end of 1996. Data East's pinball division was acquired by Sega and became Sega Pinball in 1994. By 1997, there were two companies left: Sega Pinball and Williams. In 1999, Sega sold their pinball division to Gary Stern, President of Sega Pinball at the time, who called his company Stern Pinball.

By this time, Williams games rarely sold more than 4,000 units. In 1999, Williams attempted to revive sales with the Pinball 2000 line of games, merging a video display into the pinball playfield. The reception was initially good with Revenge from Mars selling well over 6,000 machines, but short of the 10,000-plus production runs for releases just six years earlier. The next Pinball 2000 game, Star Wars Episode I, sold only a little over 3,500 machines.

Williams exited the pinball business on October 25, 1999 to focus on making gaming equipment for casinos, which was more profitable. They licensed the rights to reproduce Bally/Williams parts to Illinois Pinball and reproduce full-sized machines to The Pinball Factory. Stern Pinball remained the only manufacturer of original pinball machines until 2013, when Jersey Jack Pinball started shipping The Wizard of Oz. Many members of the design teams for Stern Pinball are former employees of Williams.

Amid the 1990s closures, virtual pinball simulations, marketed on computers and home consoles, had become high enough in quality for serious players to take notice: these video versions of pinball such as Epic Pinball, Full Tilt! Pinball and the Pro Pinball series found marketplace success and lasting fan interest, starting a new trend for realistic pinball simulation. This market existed largely independently from the physical pinball manufacturers, and relied upon original designs instead of licenses until the 2000s.

=== 2000s and beyond: Revival ===
After most pinball manufacturers' closure in the 1990s, smaller independent manufacturers started appearing in the early 2000s.

In November 2005, The Pinball Factory (TPF) in Melbourne, Australia, announced that they would be producing a new Crocodile Hunter-themed pinball machine under the Bally label. With the death of Steve Irwin, it was announced that the future of this game was uncertain. In 2006, TPF announced that they would be reproducing two popular 1990s era Williams machines, Medieval Madness and Cactus Canyon. TPF, however, was unable to make good on its promises to produce new machines, and in October 2010 transferred its Williams Electronics Games licenses as well as its pinball spare parts manufacturing and distribution business to Planetary Pinball Supply Inc, a California distributor of pinball replacement parts.

In 2006, Illinois pinball company PinBall Manufacturing Inc. produced 178 reproductions of Capcom's Big Bang Bar for the European and US markets.

In 2010, MarsaPlay in Spain manufactured a remake of Inder's original Canasta titled New Canasta, which was the first game to include a liquid-crystal display (LCD) screen in the backbox.

In 2013, Jersey Jack Pinball released The Wizard of Oz pinball machine, based on the 1939 film. It is the first pinball machine manufactured in the US with a large color display (LCD) in the backbox, the first widebody pinball machine since 1994 and the first new US pinball machine not made by Stern Pinball since 2001. This game was followed by several additional pinball machines, incorporating both existing media properties and original themes.

In 2013, the Chicago Gaming Company announced the creation of a remake of Medieval Madness. This was later followed by three additional remakes of earlier machines. They announced their first original title, Pulp Fiction, based on the film Pulp Fiction, in 2023.

In 2014, the new pinball manufacturer Spooky Pinball released their first game, America's Most Haunted. This was followed by a few more themed, original, and contracted titles.

In 2015, the new British pinball manufacturer Heighway Pinball released the racing themed pinball machine Full Throttle. The game has an LCD screen for scores, info, and animations located in the playfield surface at player's eye view. The game was designed with modularity in mind so that the playfield and artwork could be swapped out for future game titles. Heighway Pinball's second title, Alien, was released in 2017 and was based on the Alien and Aliens films. Due to internal company issues, Heighway Pinball ceased manufacturing operations and closed its doors in April 2018. The company assets were obtained by the Scandinavian company named Pinball Brothers, and in 2020, they officially announced the remake of the Alien pinball machine. Pinball Brothers released additional game titles, including Queen revealed in 2021 (based on the rock band Queen, and ABBA in 2024 (based on the Swedish rock band ABBA).

In 2016, Dutch Pinball, based in the Netherlands, released their first game The Big Lebowski, based on the 1998 film, The Big Lebowski.

In 2017, Multimorphic began shipping its pinball machine platform after several years of development. It is a modular design where different games can be swapped into the cabinet. It also has a large interactive display as the playfield surface, which differs from all prior pinball machines traditionally made of plywood and embedded with translucent plastic inserts for lighting. Multimorphic released several more unlicensed titles, and in 2022, released their first licensed game: Weird Al's Museum of Natural Hilarity (based on parody music artist "Weird Al" Yankovic). This was followed by additional licensed titles: The Princess Bride in 2024 (based on the movie of the same name), and Portal in 2025 (based on the Valve video game series of the same name).

In 2017, American Pinball released its first production game, Houdini, followed by Oktoberfest (2018), Hot Wheels (2020), Legends of Valhalla (2020), Galactic Tank Force (2023), and Barry O's BBQ Challenge (2024). Barry O's BBQ Challenge was a tribute to and the final game designed by pinball designer Barry Oursler, who passed in 2022.

In 2023, Barrels of Fun released its first production game, Jim Henson's Labyrinth. Barrels of Fun followed with Dune in 2025, based on the 2021 Dune film and the 2024 sequel.

In 2024, Turner Pinball began production on their first game named Ninja Eclipse, and in 2025 revealed their second game named Merlin's Arcade.

In 2024, Pedretti Gaming released a remake of FunHouse, and incorporated an LCD screen into the backbox, as well as a number of other technological updates to the original game.

=== Relation to gambling ===
External videos
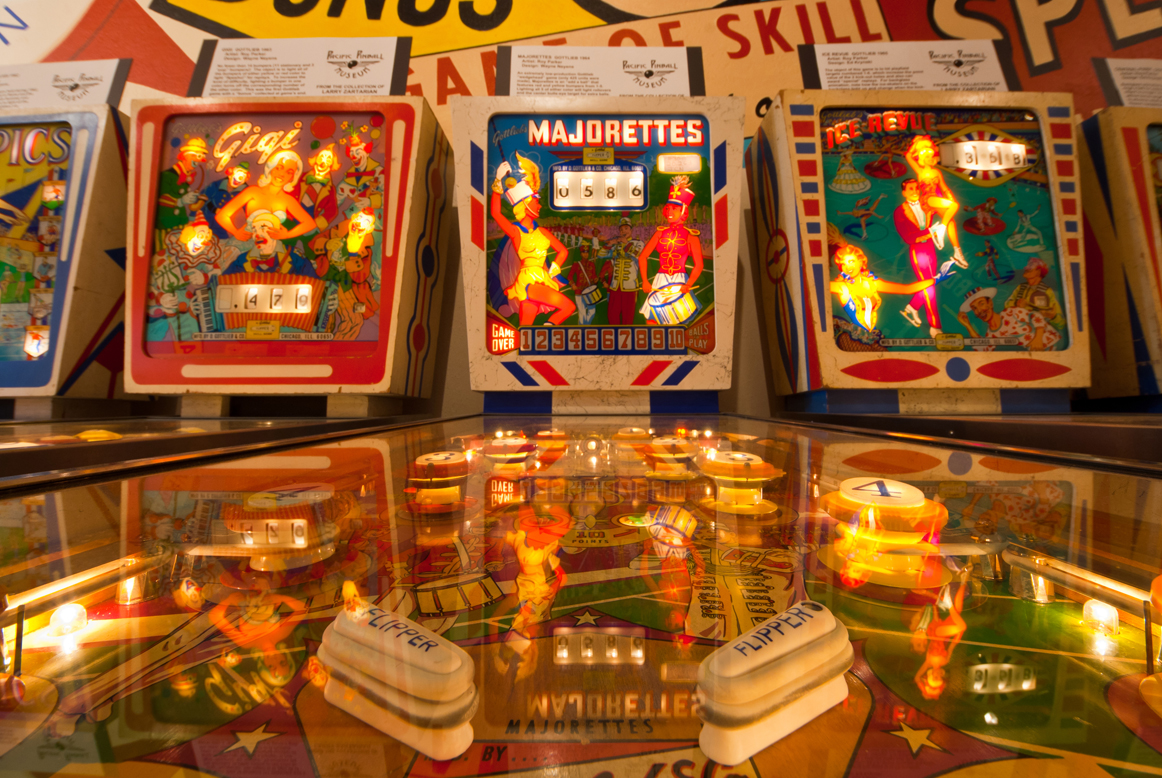
- When Pinball was Illegal, Retro Report Voices, 2:12, Retro Report

Pinball machines, like many other mechanical games, were sometimes used as gambling devices. Some pinball machines, such as Bally's "bingos", featured a grid on the backglass scoring area with spaces corresponding to targets or holes on the playfield. Free games could be won if the player could get the balls to land in a winning pattern; however, doing this was nearly random, and a common use for such machines was for gambling. Other machines allowed players to win and accumulate large numbers of "free games" which could then be cashed out for money with the location owner.

Later, this type of feature was discontinued to legitimize the machines, and to avoid legal problems in areas where awarding free games was considered illegal, some games, called Add-A-Ball, did away with the free game feature, instead giving players extra balls to play, between 5 and 25 in most cases. These extra balls were indicated via lighted graphics in the backglass or by a ball count wheel, but in some areas that was disallowed, and some games were shipped with a sticker to cover the counters.

Pinball was banned beginning in the early 1940s until 1976 in New York City. New York mayor Fiorello La Guardia was responsible for the ban, believing that it robbed school children of their hard-earned nickels and dimes. La Guardia spearheaded major raids throughout the city, collecting thousands of machines. The mayor participated with police in destroying machines with sledgehammers before dumping the remnants into the city's rivers.

The ban ended when Roger Sharpe, a star witness for the AMOA – Amusement and Music Operators Association, testified in April 1976 before a committee in a Manhattan courtroom that pinball games had become games of skill and were not games of chance, which are more closely associated with gambling. He began to play one of two games set up in the courtroom, and – in a move he compares to Babe Ruth's home run in the 1932 World Series – called out precisely what he was going to shoot for, and then proceeded to do so. Astonished committee members reportedly voted to remove the ban, which was followed in other cities. Sharpe reportedly acknowledges, in a self-deprecating manner, his courtroom shot was by sheer luck although there was admittedly skill involved in what he did.

Like New York, Los Angeles banned pinball machines in 1939. The ban was overturned by the Supreme Court of California in 1974 because (1) if pinball machines were games of chance, the ordinance was preempted by state law governing games of chance in general, and (2) if they were games of skill, the ordinance was unconstitutional as a denial of the equal protection of the laws. Although it was rarely enforced, Chicago's ban on pinball lasted three decades and ended in 1977. Philadelphia and Salt Lake City also had similar bans. Regardless of these events, some towns in the United States still have such bans on their books; the town of Kokomo, Indiana lifted its ordinance banning pinball in December 2016, and although the law was not enforced, South Carolina banned minors under 18 from playing pinball machines (SC-63-19-2430) until June 2026.

== Components ==
=== Cabinet ===
The cabinet of a pinball machine is the (traditionally wooden) frame usually shaped like a box, with the playfield laid inside.

=== Backbox/head ===
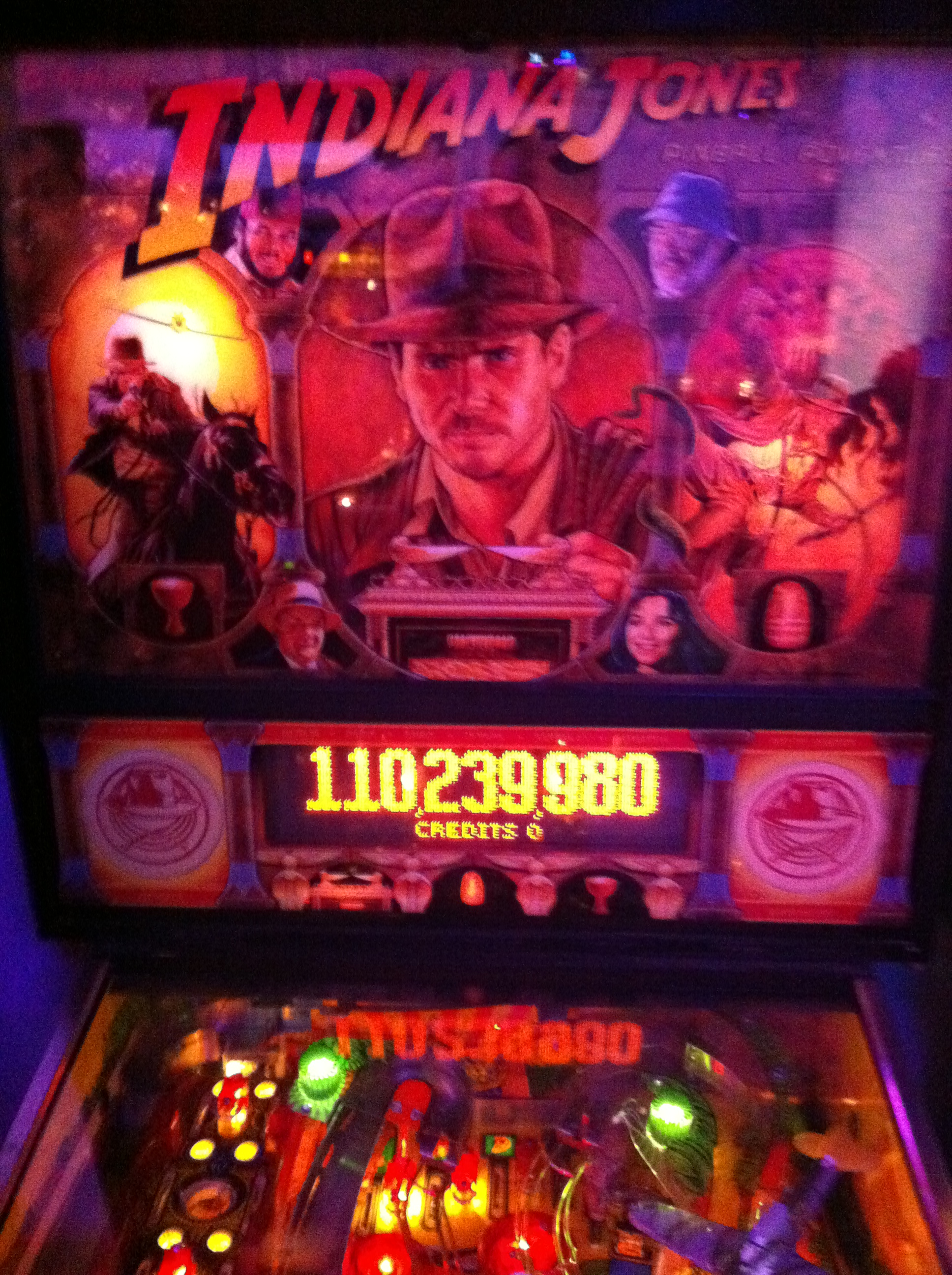
Backbox/head & Backglass shows the pinball machine's theme, player's score and missions for the player to do.

The 'backbox', 'head', or 'lightbox' is the vertical box atop the cabinet opposite the player's position. It usually consists of a wooden box with colorful graphics on the side and a large 'backglass' in the front. The backglass usually has very stylized graphics related to the game.

=== Backglass ===
The backglass is a vertical graphic panel mounted on the front of the backbox. The backglass contains the name of the machine, graphics, and score displays (lights, mechanical wheels, an LED display, or a dot-matrix display depending on the era). Some backglasses include a mechanical device tied to gameplay, such as NBA Fastbreak, which featured a miniature basketball and hoop. For older games, the backglass image is screen printed in layers on the reverse side of a piece of glass; in more recent games, the image is imprinted into a translite.

=== Playfield ===
The playfield is a planar surface inclined upward, usually at six and a half degrees, away from the player, and includes multiple targets and scoring objectives. Some operators intentionally extend threaded levelers on the rear legs and/or shorten or remove the levelers on the front legs to create additional incline in the playfield, making the ball move faster and harder to play.

=== Plunger ===
The plunger is a spring-loaded rod with a small handle, used to propel the ball into the playfield. The player can control the amount of force used for launching by pulling the plunger a certain distance (thus changing the spring compression). This is often used for a "skill shot", in which a player attempts to launch a ball so that it exactly hits a specified target. Once the ball is in motion in the main area of the playfield, the plunger is not used again until another ball must be brought onto the playfield. An electronically controlled launcher is sometimes substituted for the plunger in modern machines. The shape of the ball launch button that replaces the plunger may be modified to fit the aesthetics of a particular game's theme, such as being made to look like the trigger of a gun in a game with a military or action-hero theme.

=== Flippers ===
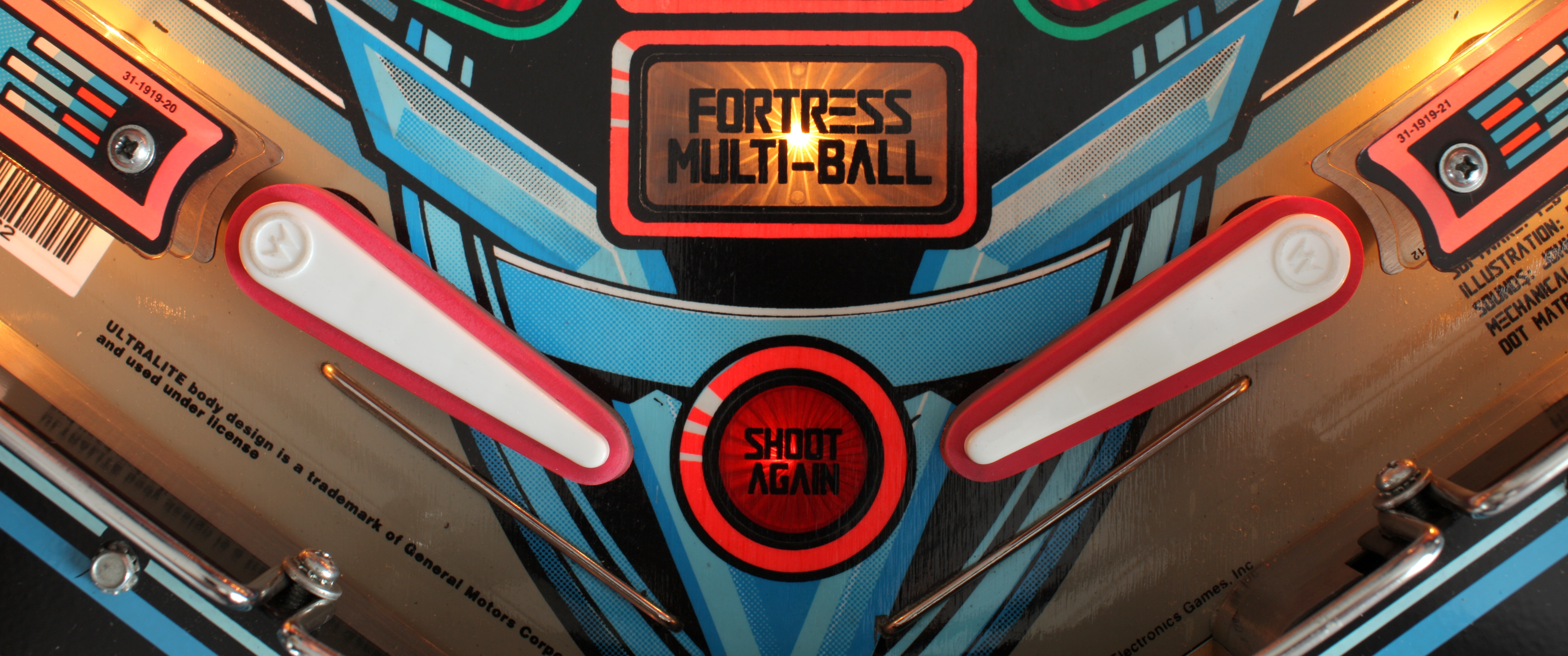
Flippers allow the player to redirect the ball.

The flippers are one or more mechanically or electromechanically (solenoid) controlled levers, roughly 3 to 7 cm (1 1/4 to 2 3/4 in) in length, used for redirecting the ball up the playfield. They are the main control that the player has over the ball, usually by corresponding pushbuttons on the cabinet's sides. They can primarily be switched fully on, sometimes with two different strengths for thrusting the flipper up and for holding it in position. Careful timing of this limited positional control allows the player to direct the ball in a range of directions with various levels of velocity and spin. With the flippers, the player attempts to move the ball to hit various types of scoring targets, and to keep the ball from disappearing off the bottom of the playfield.

The very first pinball games appeared in the early 1930s and did not have flippers. After launching the ball simply proceeded down the playfield, directed by static nails (or "pins") to one of several scoring areas. These pins gave the game its name. In 1947, the first mechanical flippers appeared on Gottlieb's Humpty Dumpty and by the early 1950s, the two-flipper configuration at the bottom above the center drain had become standard.

Some pinball models have a third or fourth flipper. A few later machines have flippers that the machine's software could operate independently of the flipper button. During "Thing Flips" on The Addams Family pinball machine, the upper-left flipper automatically triggers a brief moment after the ball passes an optical sensor just above the flipper. Very few machines came with curve-shaped banana flippers.

The introduction of flippers ushered in the "golden age" of pinball, where the fierce competition between the various pinball manufacturers led to constant innovation in the field. Various types of stationary and moving targets were added, spinning scoring reels replaced games featuring static scores lit from behind. Multiplayer scores were added soon after, and then bells and other noise-makers, all of which began to make pinball less a game and more of an experience. The flippers have loaned pinball its common name in many languages, where the game is known mainly as "flipper".

=== Bumpers ===
Bumpers are round knobs that, when hit, will actively push the ball away. There is also an earlier variety of bumper (known as a dead bumper or passive bumper) that does not propel the ball away; most bumpers on machines built since the 1960s are active bumpers, variously called "pop bumpers", "thumper bumpers", "jet bumpers", or "turbo bumpers". Most recent games include a set of pop bumpers, usually three, sometimes more or fewer depending on the designer's goals. Bumpers predate flippers, and active bumpers served to add interest and complexity to older games.

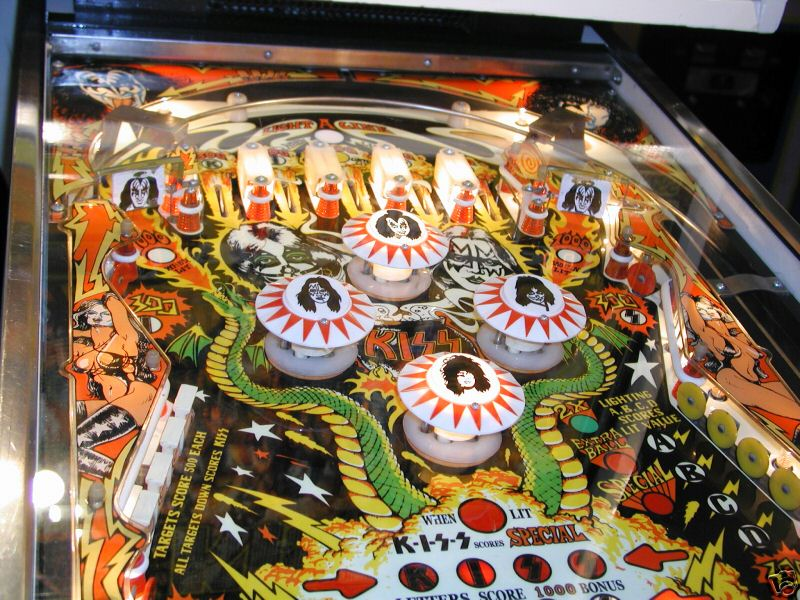
Bumpers add complexity and excitement to pinball

Pop bumpers are operated by a switch connected to a ring surrounding the bottom circumference of the bumper that is suspended several millimeters above the playfield surface. When the ball rolls over this ring and forces one side of it down, a switch is closed that activates the bumper's solenoid. This pulls down a tapered ring surrounding the central post of the bumper that pushes downward and outward on the ball, propelling it away.

=== Kickers and slingshots ===
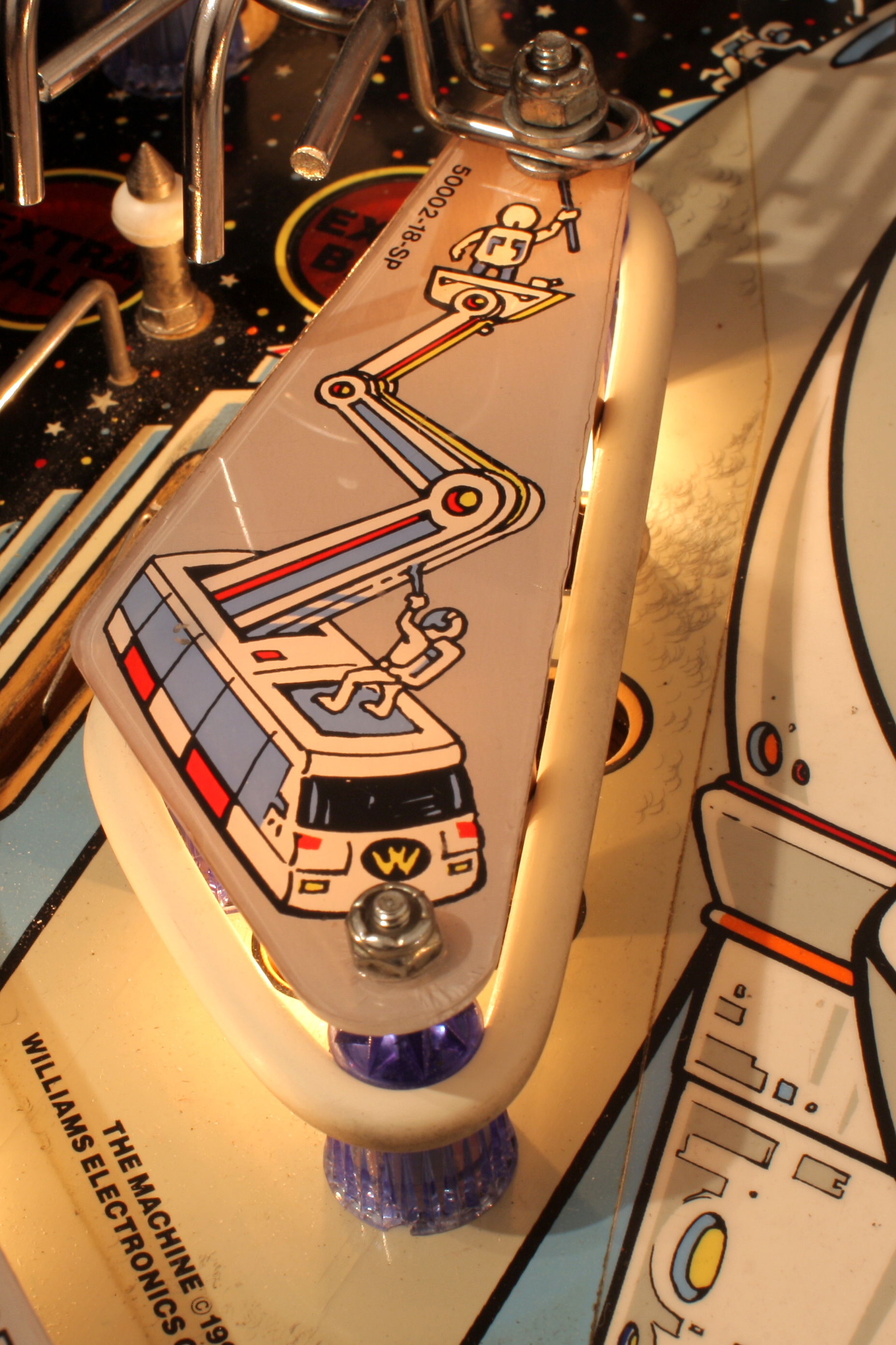
Slingshots have rubber bands around them. Switches behind the rubber detect the ball's impact and a solenoid-driven lever kicks it away.

Kickers and slingshots are rubber pads that propel the ball away upon impact, like bumpers, but are usually a horizontal side of a wall. Every recent pinball machine includes slingshots to the upper left and upper right of the lowest set of flippers; older games used more experimental arrangements. They operate similarly to pop bumpers, with a switch on each side of a solenoid-operated lever arm in a typical arrangement. The switches are closed by ball contact with the rubber on the kicker's face, which activates the solenoid.

Early pinball machines typically had full solenoid current passing through trigger switches for all types of solenoids, from kickers to pop bumpers to the flippers themselves. This caused arcing across switch contacts and rapid contact fouling and failure. As electronics were gradually implemented in pinball design, solenoids began to be switched by power transistors under software control to lower switch voltage and current, vastly extend switch service lifetime, and add flexibility to game design.

The smaller, lower-powered solenoids were first to be transistorized, followed later by the higher-current solenoids as the price, performance, and reliability of power transistors improved over the years.

=== Targets ===
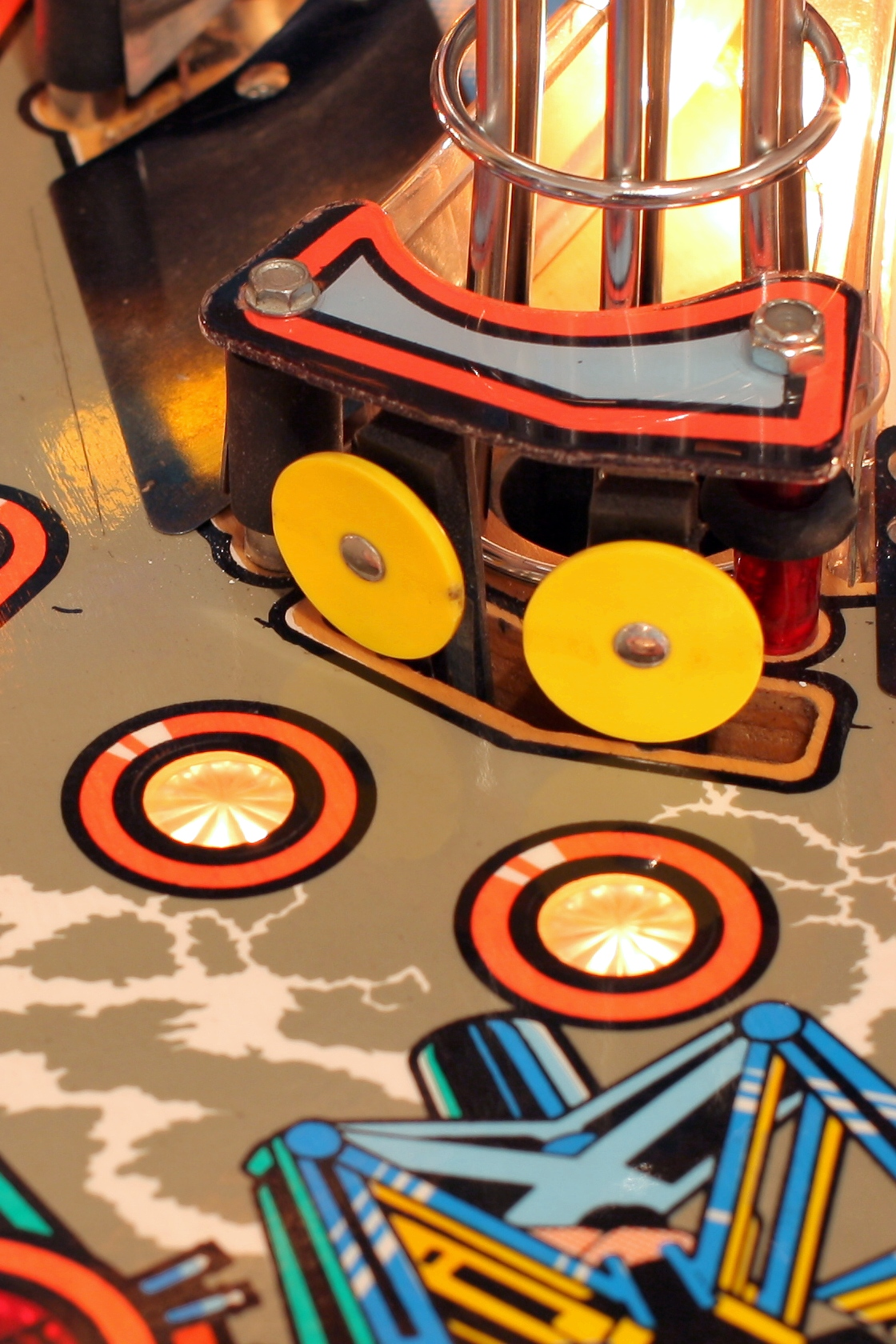
Stationary targets detect the ball's impact and typically increment the player's score.

- Stationary Targets: These are static targets that simply record when a ball strikes them. These are generally the simplest playfield elements. They are also known as spot targets or standup targets.
- Bullseye Targets: These are static targets that have two concentric elements, similar to a stationary target. Hitting the outer ring usually scores lower than hitting the center bull's eye. They are found chiefly in older electro-mechanical games.
- Drop targets: These are targets that drop below the playfield when hit. Eliminating an entire row in this manner may lead to any of various features. Once an entire bank of drop targets is hit, the bank may reset or pop back up. Alternatively, the drop targets can be placed in front of other targets, requiring the drop target to be knocked down before the targets behind can be hit, or the drop target may only pop up at specific times to deny the player the ability to shoot the ball into whatever is behind it. If used in the latter way, the target is usually blocking a lane or ramp.
- Kicking Target: Used rarely, these targets look like stationary targets, but when hit, they kick the ball away in the opposite direction, much like a slingshot or bumper.
- Vari-Target: These targets award different points depending on how hard the target was hit. It is a metal arm that pivots under the playfield. When a ball hits it, it ratchets back sometimes, resetting immediately or resetting only after it is hit all the way back. A large sum of points is usually awarded when the target is hit back all the way with one strike of the ball.

=== Holes and saucers ===
- Holes: The player directs the ball into a hole. In modern games, there are both vertical and horizontal holes (also called scoops), and the game may include mechanisms to move the ball between them. A "gobble hole" is sometimes included in some older games, which does not return the ball, but gives a large bonus or a game feature, which may be the ball itself.
- Saucers: A shallow hole with a kicker inside. The ball remains visible on the playfield and is kicked out straight up (usually into a duct or rail chute) or sideways back onto the playfield.

Initially, holes and saucers worked by using tubes behind the playing field, with a pin at the top to hold the ball for later drops. Another version of the tube uses two spinning wheels to transfer the ball from hole to hole. Newer versions use an electronic track with a carriage or an electromagnet to pull the ball between holes.

=== Spinners and rollovers ===
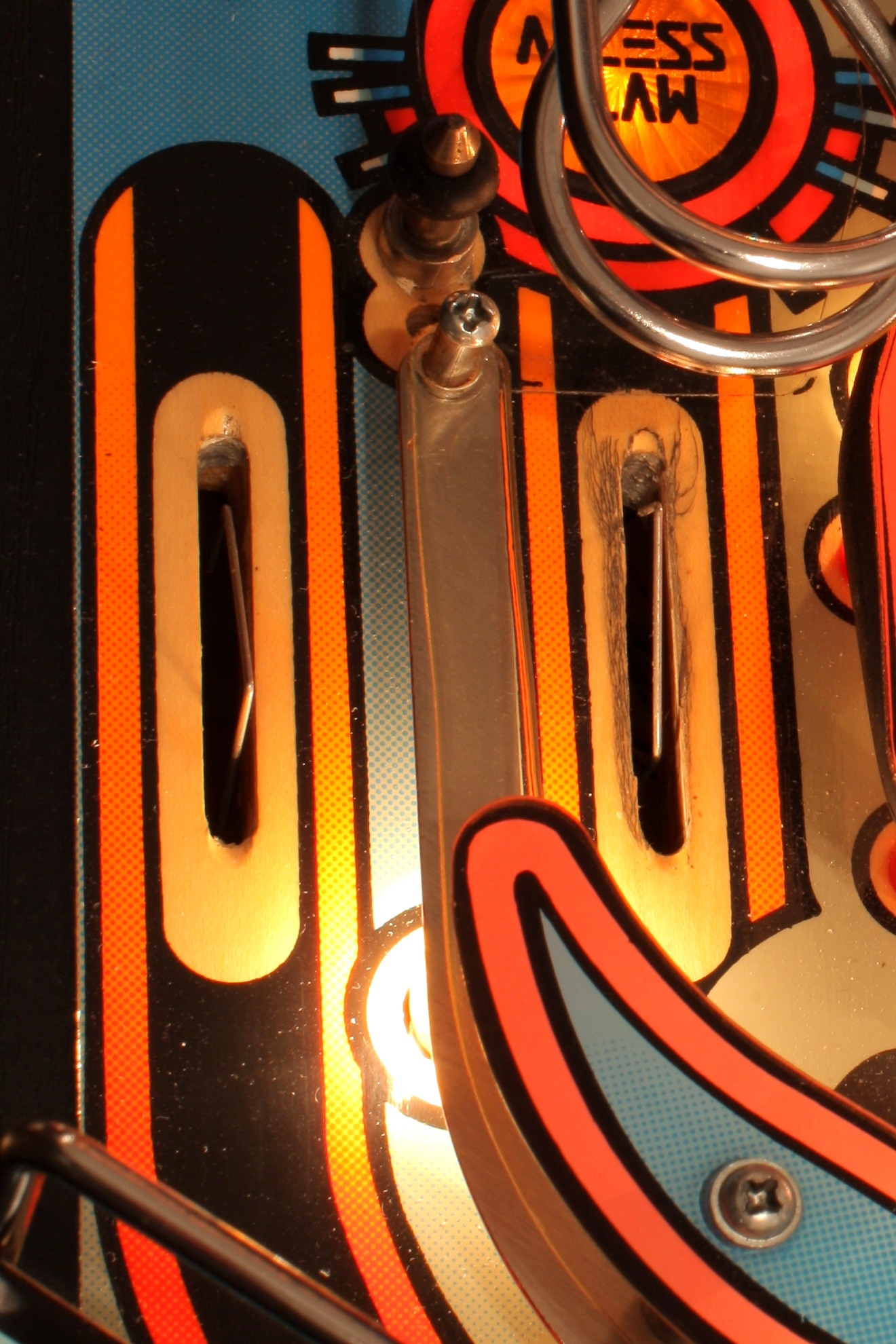
Rollovers detect when the ball passes over them.

- Spinners: A ball can push through a flat surface hinged in the middle, causing it to spin; each rotation adds points.
- Rollovers: These are targets activated when a ball rolls over them. Often a series of rollover targets are placed side-by-side and with dividers between them forming "lanes"; the player must guide the ball to particular lanes (or to all lanes) to complete an objective. Such lanes are frequently placed at the bottom sides of the playfield: "inlanes" feed the ball back to the flippers, "outlanes" cause the ball to drain immediately. On many machines, outlanes can have extra balls or "specials" lit to play the same role as the older gobble holes.
- Whirlwind Spinner(s): Used in some games, a whirlwind spinner is a rapidly rotating (often rubberized) disk on the playfield that momentarily "grabs" the ball and throws it in a random direction. Some games couple a whirlwind spinner with a magnet placed in the center, although Data East seems to be the only manufacturer to do so. Bally's "Fireball" and Chicago Coin's "Casino" were popular games with a whirlwind spinner.

=== Switches, gates, and stoppers ===
- Switch: A switch is an area that is blocked off after the ball passes through it once. An example of this is the initial firing lane: as a ball passes through the firing lane, it hits a switch and cannot reenter that chute.
- Gate: This block will allow balls to come through one way but will block the ball if it is going the other way.
- Stopper: Also called a magic post, this is a small pole most often found centered between and just below the lowest set of flippers and also rarely next to the outlanes. When activated (typically by hitting a specific target or targets), the pole ascends from inside the machine, blocking the area between the flippers for a limited time, making it more difficult to drain and lose the ball. After time expires, it returns to its resting place just below the playfield.

=== Ramps ===
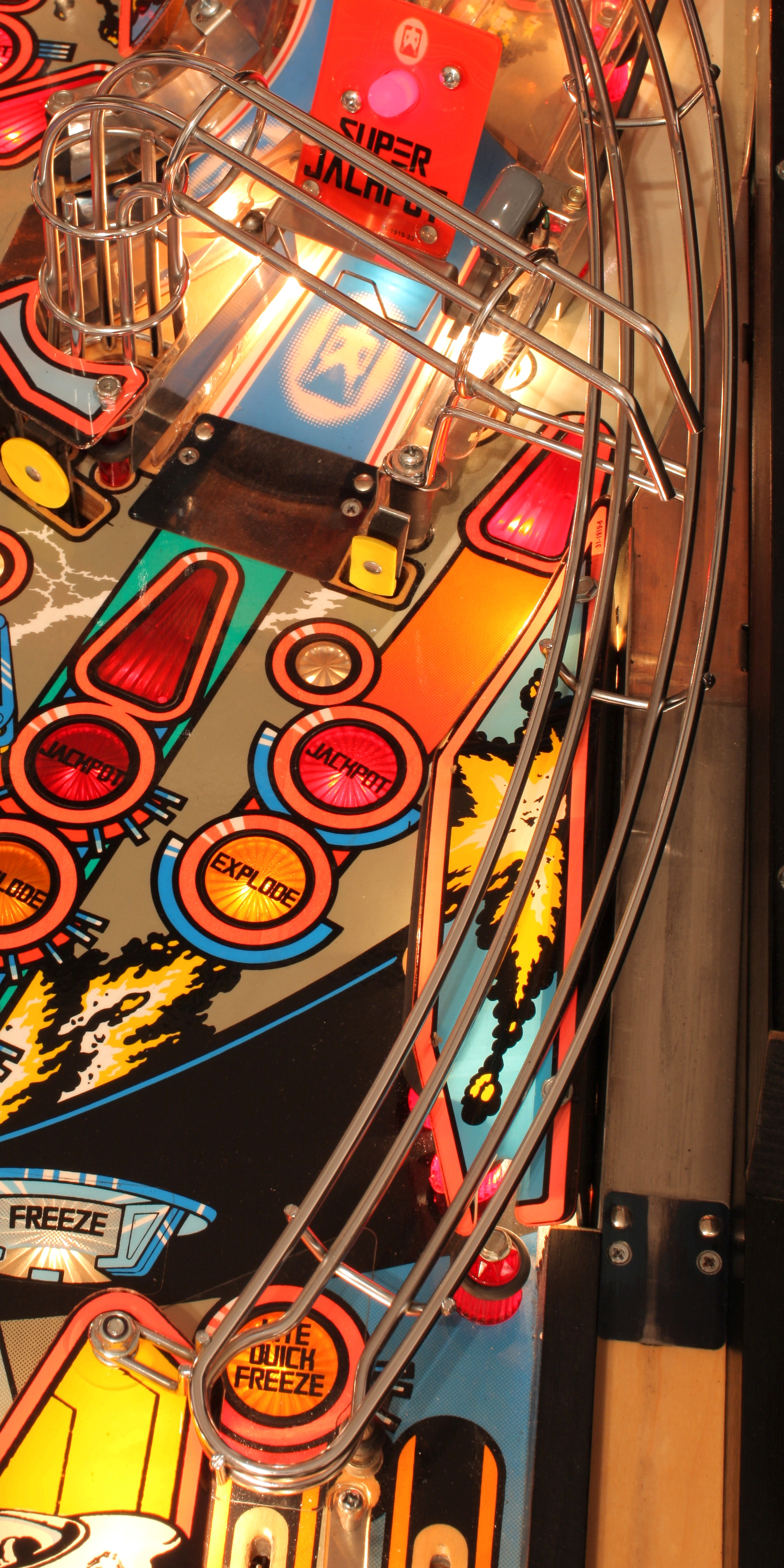
A wire ramp along which the ball can travel

Ramps are inclined planes with a gentle enough slope that the ball may travel along it. The player attempts to direct the ball with enough force to make it to the top of the ramp and down the other side. If the player succeeds, a "ramp shot" has been made. Ramps frequently end so that the ball goes to a flipper so one can make several ramp shots in a row. The number of ramp shots scored in a game is often tallied, and reaching certain numbers may lead to various game features. At other times, the ramps will go to smaller "mini-playfields" (small playfields, usually raised above the main game surface, with special goals or scoring).

=== Toys, magnets and captive balls ===
- Toys: Toys are various items on, above, or beneath the playfield (items beneath the playfield visible through windows) or attached to the cabinet (usually to the backbox). Usually, each toy is unique to the machine it was made for, and reflects the game's theme. They may be visual only, and have no effect on gameplay; they may be alternate ways of performing common game functions (for example, instead of using a drop hole to hold the ball, a hand or claw might reach out, grab the ball, and capture it that way); or they may be an integral part of the game rules and play (for instance, having a smaller playfield over the main playfield that can be tilted right and left by the player, using the flipper buttons).
- Electromagnets: Some machines feature electrically operated magnets below the playfield to affect the ball's speed and trajectory according to the current state of gameplay. This may be done to make the ball's movement unpredictable, temporarily halt the ball (as a ball saver, for example), or otherwise control the ball by non-mechanical means. Electromagnets may also be used in above-playfield elements (often as part of the playfield toys) to grab the ball and move it elsewhere (onto a mini-playfield, for example). The Williams machine The Twilight Zone featured a mini-playfield that used electromagnets controlled by the flipper buttons, allowing the player to flip the ball on the mini-playfield, essentially working as invisible flippers. Contrary to a popular myth, there are no professionally produced pinball machines that contain magnets under the playfield intended to clandestinely make gameplay harder or increase ball losses.
- Captive balls: Sometimes a ball can move around only within a confined area. A typical application of this has a short lane on the playfield with a narrow opening, inside which a captive ball is held. The player can strike this captive ball with the ball in play, pushing it along the lane to activate a rollover switch or target. In games such as Theatre of Magic, captive balls sometimes have what is called a "Newton Ball", which is a stationary ball adjacent to a free ball in a small lane. The ball being played strikes the Newton ball which, in turn, transfers its momentum to the adjacent ball, which causes it to move.

== Features ==
Pinball games have become increasingly complex. Multiple play modes, multi-level playfields, and even progression through a rudimentary "plot" have become common features in recent games. Pinball scoring objectives often require a series of targets to be hit in a particular order. Recent pinball games are distinguished by their requiring strategy and planning for maximum scoring. Players seeking the highest scores are advised to study a game's placard (usually found in the lower-left corner of the playfield) to learn the specific patterns required for advanced features and scoring.

Common features in modern pinball games include the following:

- Ball lock: Each time a ball goes into a specific hole or target, it is locked, and a new ball appears at the plunger. The multiball feature starts when the player has locked the required number of balls (often three). On some games, the balls are physically locked in place by solenoid-actuated gates, but many newer machines use virtual ball locks instead, in which the game merely keeps count of the number of locked balls and then auto-launches them from the main ball trough when it is time for them to be released.
- Multiball: This occurs when there is more than one ball in play at a time and usually includes some kind of jackpot scoring. Multiball ends when all but one ball is lost down the bottom of the playfield, and then regular play resumes.
- Jackpot: Some targets on the playfield increase the scoring value of something else, which could be as simple as hitting a ramp, or a complicated sequence of targets. Upon their inception, the jackpot was the main goal of most pinball machines in the 1980s. Jackpots often ranged from one to four million (back when this was a significant addition to the score), and their value would accrue between games until it was scored. Scoring it was usually a complicated task. Modern games often dilute the meaning of "jackpot". Modern games give off several jackpots in each multiball mode, which is usually quite easy to attain, and the value of today's jackpots is far less significant. Many jackpots awarded during special modes often do not increase at all, but are instead simply fixed-value bonuses.
- End-of-ball bonus: After each ball is played, the player scores bonus points depending on how many times certain features have been activated or the numbers of items that the player may obtain. Some games award a seemingly arbitrary number of points that depend on the number of times any switch has been hit. Virtually all games have the ability to assign a multiplier to the bonus. Most games cap the bonus multiplier at 5x or 10x, although more modern games apparently have no limit.
- Extra ball: If a player has earned this, when they lose a ball they get another one to play immediately afterward and the machine does not count the lost ball towards the limit of balls for that game. For example, if the player were on ball two and they earn an extra ball, the next ball will still be counted as ball two instead of the third ball. When a machine says "SHOOT AGAIN" on the scoreboard, it signifies that an extra ball will shoot. In a multiplayer game, the player who just lost the ball is the same one to shoot again.
- Kickback: When a ball goes into one of the outlane instead of draining goes into a kicker that will launch the ball back into play. Their use is limited and has to be earned to be used.
- Various timed rounds (modes): For example, if the player hit a specific target three times within the next 20 seconds, they might score several tens of millions of points for it. There are many and various time-related features in pinball. Progression through each mode is frequently accompanied by DMD animations and sound.
- Stackability: To stack means that the player can run one play mode while another mode is in progress. This strategy usually yields higher scores. A noted example of this is Williams' Bram Stoker's Dracula, with its Multi-Multiball feature.
- Wizard Mode: This is a special scoring mode, which is reached after meeting certain prerequisites to access this mode (e.g., finishing all modes). This is the pinball equivalent of the final boss fight in video games. Classic examples of this include Williams' Black Knight 2000 (The King's Ransom) and Midway's Twilight Zone (Lost in the Zone). Named after The Who's song "Pinball Wizard". Wizard modes come in two varieties: goal-oriented types where the player receives a huge number of points after completing a specific task, or multiball modes with 4–6 balls in play, and virtually every feature active. Some games offer both and award the latter as a condition for completing the former.
- Ball Saver: Many modern games include a feature that prevents a player from being disappointed if a ball sent into play quickly drains before substantial points have been added. This player will immediately be given another (free) ball to compensate. Electromechanical games made during the 1970s had a similar Ball Index switch system that returned a drained ball if no points were made.
- Slam Tilt: There are special tilt switches placed on the underside of the playfield, on the coin door, and (on electromechanical games) in the lower cabinet and upper cabinet, designed to prevent cheating. If a player lifts and drops, pounds, or kicks the machine and activates any slam tilt, the entire game ends immediately for all players and may go into a reset/reboot mode. These are also used on video and coin pusher games. A similar Incline Tilt prevents a player from lifting the front of the cabinet to tip the ball back up the playfield by ending his turn.

In the 1990s, game designers often put hidden, recurring images or references in their games, which became known as easter eggs. For example, Williams' designers hid cows in the video displays of the games, and Pat Lawlor placed a red button in the artwork of games he developed. The methods used to find the hidden items usually involved pressing the flipper buttons in a certain order or during specific events. Designers also included hidden messages or in-jokes; one example of this is the phrase "DOHO" sometimes seen quickly displayed on the dot matrix displays, a reference to Doris Ho, the wife of then-Williams display artist Scott "Matrix" Slomiany. DOHO was popularly thought to be an acronym for Documented Occurrence of a Hidden Object until its true meaning was revealed in a PinGame Journal article on the subject. The game Star Trek: The Next Generation went so far as to embed a hidden Breakout-like game, available only after a complex sequence of events had been accomplished during the game.

== Scoring points ==
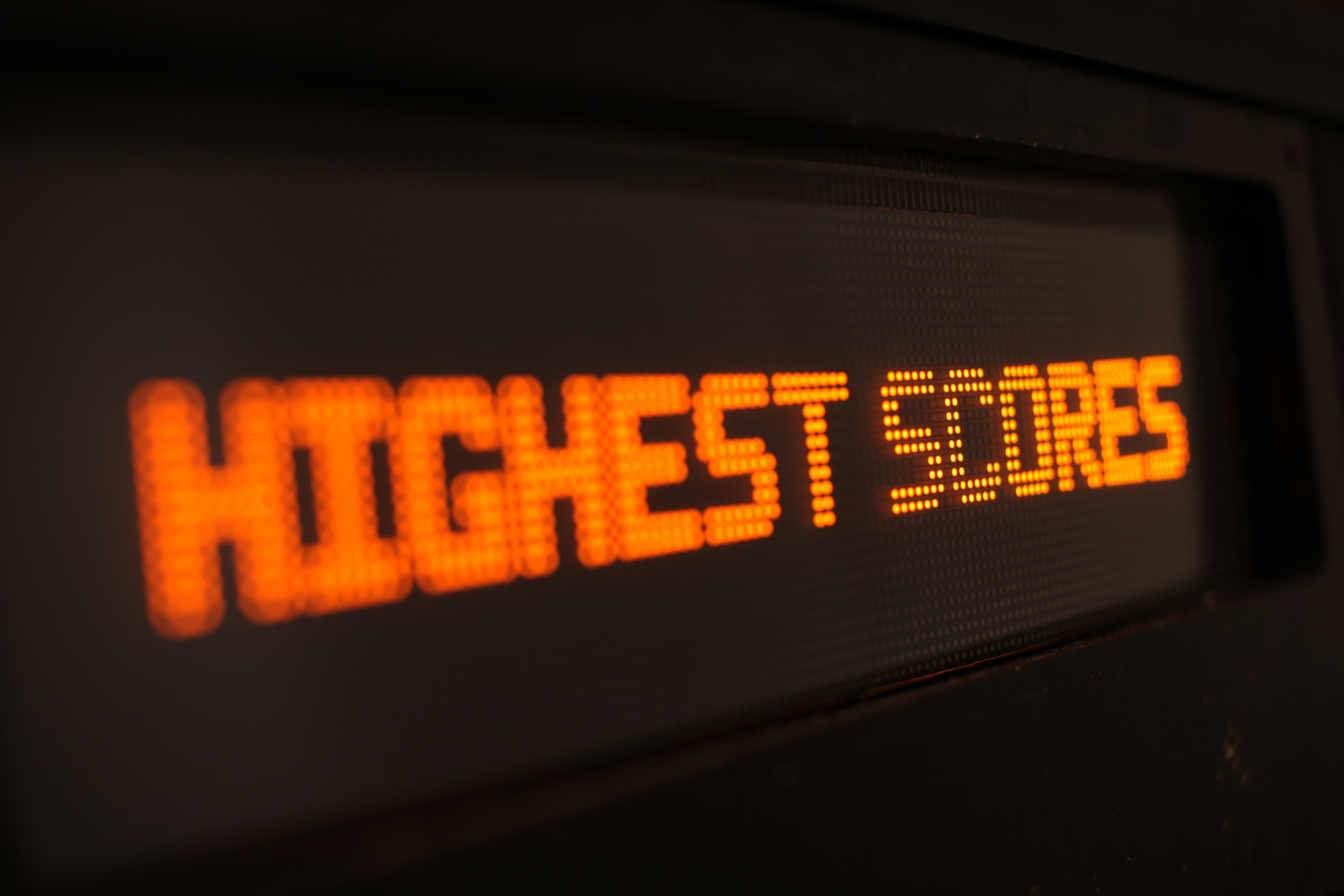
Dot-matrix display

Contact with or manipulation of scoring elements (such as targets or ramps) scores points for the player. Electrical switches embedded in the scoring elements detect contact and relay this information to the scoring mechanism. Older pinball machines used an electromechanical system for scoring wherein a pulse from a switch would cause a complex mechanism composed of relays to ratchet up the score. In later games these tasks have been taken over by semiconductor chips and displays are made on electronic segmented or dot-matrix displays (DMD). The first DMD on a pinball machine was used by Checkpoint and features also video mode minigames.

MarsaPlay in Spain manufactured a remake of Inder's original Canasta titled New Canasta, with an LCD screen in the backbox in 2010. The Wizard of Oz is the first US pinball machine that used a LCD in the back box. It is used for scoring and mini-games and to display full color videos. Other display innovations on pinball machines include pinball video game hybrids like Baby Pac-Man in 1982 and Granny and the Gators in 1984 and the use of a small color video monitor for scoring and minigames in the backbox of the pinball machine Dakar from manufacturer Mr. Game in 1988 and CGA color monitors in Pinball 2000 in 1999 that uses a Pepper's ghost technique to reflect the monitor in the head of the machine. ColorDMD is an LCD screen that is used to replace the standard mono color DMDs, and uses colorized animations.

Pinball scoring can be peculiar and varies greatly from machine to machine. During the 1930s and the 1940s, lights mounted behind the painted backglasses were used for scoring purposes, making the scoring somewhat arbitrary. Frequently the lights represented scores in the hundreds of thousands. During the 1950s and 1960s when the scoring mechanism was limited to mechanical wheels, high scores were frequently only in the hundreds or thousands. In an effort to keep with the traditional high scores attained with the painted backglass games, the first pinball machines to use mechanical wheels for scoring, such as Army Navy, allowed the score to reach into the millions by adding a number of permanent zeros to the end of the score.

The average score changed again in the 1970s with the advent of electronic displays. Average scores soon began to commonly increase back into tens or hundreds of thousands. Since then, there has been a trend of scoring inflation, with modern machines often requiring scores of over a billion points to win a free game. At the peak of this trend, Williams No Fear: Dangerous Sports and Jack-Bot have been played into ten billions and Williams Johnny Mnemonic and Bally/Midway Attack from Mars, have been played into one hundred billion.

The 1997 Bally game NBA Fastbreak which, true to its theme, awards points in terms of a real basketball score: Each successful shot can give from one to three points. Getting a hundred points by the end of a game is considered respectable, which makes it one of the lowest scoring pinball machines of all time. The inflated scores are the source of one of the Spanish-language names of pinball machines, máquina del millón ("million machine").

=== Special scores ===
- High score lists: If a player attains one of the highest scores ever (or the highest score on a given day), they are invited to add their initials to a displayed list of high-scorers on that particular machine. "Bragging rights" associated with being on the high-score list are a powerful incentive for experienced players to master a new machine.

Pinball designers also entice players with the chance to win a free game or credit. Ways to get a free game might include the following:

- Replay: A free game is awarded if the player exceeds a specified score. Some machines allow the operator to set this score to increase with each consecutive game in which the replay score is achieved, in order to prevent a skilled player from gaining virtually unlimited play on one credit by simply achieving the same replay score in every game.
- Special: A mechanism to get a free game during play is usually called a "special". Typically, some hard-to-reach feature of the game will light the outlanes (the areas to the extreme left and right of the flippers) for special. Since the outlanes always lose the ball, having "special" there makes it worth shooting for them (and is usually the only time, if this is the case).
- Match: At the end of the game, if a set digit of the player's score matches a random digit, a free game is awarded. In earlier machines, the set digit was usually the ones place; after a phenomenon often referred to as score inflation had happened (causing almost all scores to end in 0), the set digit was usually the tens place. The chances of a match appear to be 1 in 10, but the operator can alter this probability – the default is usually 7% in all modern Williams and Bally games for example. Other non-numeric methods are sometimes used to award a match.
- High Score: Bally/Midway, Williams and Stern Pinball machines award 1–3 free games if a player gets on the high score list. Typically, one or two credits are awarded for a 1st–4th place listing, and three for the Grand Champion.

When a free game is won, most machines typically makes a single loud bang, most often with a solenoid that strikes a piece of metal, or the side of the cabinet, with a rod, known as a knocker, or less commonly with loudspeakers. "Knocking" is the act of winning a free game when the knocker makes the loud and distinctive noise.

== Playing techniques ==
The primary skill of pinball involves application of the proper timing and technique to the operation of the flippers, nudging the playfield when appropriate without tilting, and choosing targets for scores or features. A placard is often placed in a lower corner of the playfield with pricing information and details about game-specific rules and scoring techniques.

=== Nudging ===
Players can influence the movement of the ball by moving or bumping the pinball machine, a technique known as "nudging" or "shaking".

There are tilt mechanisms which guard against excessive manipulation of this sort. The mechanisms generally include:

- a grounded plumb bob centered in an electrified metal ring – when the machine is jostled or shaken too far or too hard, the bob contacts the ring, completing a circuit. The bob is usually cone-shaped allowing the operator to slide it vertically, controlling the sensitivity.
- an electrified ball on a slight ramp with a grounded post at the top of the ramp – when the front of the machine is lifted (literally, tilted) too high, the ball rolls to the top of the ramp and completes the circuit.
- an impact sensor – usually located on the coin door, the playfield and/or the cabinet itself.

When any of these sensors is activated, the game registers a "tilt" and the lights go out, solenoids for the flippers no longer work, and other playfield systems become inoperative so that the ball can do nothing other than roll down the playfield directly to the drain. A tilt will usually result in forfeiting the end-of-ball bonus points that would have been earned by the player during that ball; the game is automatically over if it is the last ball and the player has no extra ball. Older games would immediately end the ball in play on a tilt.

Modern games give tilt warnings before sacrificing the ball in play. The number of tilt warnings can be adjusted by the operator of the machine. Until recently most games also had a "slam tilt" switch which guarded against kicking or slamming the coin mechanism, or for overly aggressive behavior with the machine, which could give a false indication that a coin had been inserted, thereby giving a free game or credit. This feature was taken out by default in Stern SAM System games, but can be added as an option; some other manufacturers omit it entirely. A slam tilt will typically end the current game for all players.

=== Trapping ===
Players can hold a ball in place with the flipper, giving them more control over where they want to place the ball when they shoot it forward. This is known as trapping.

== Manufacturing process ==
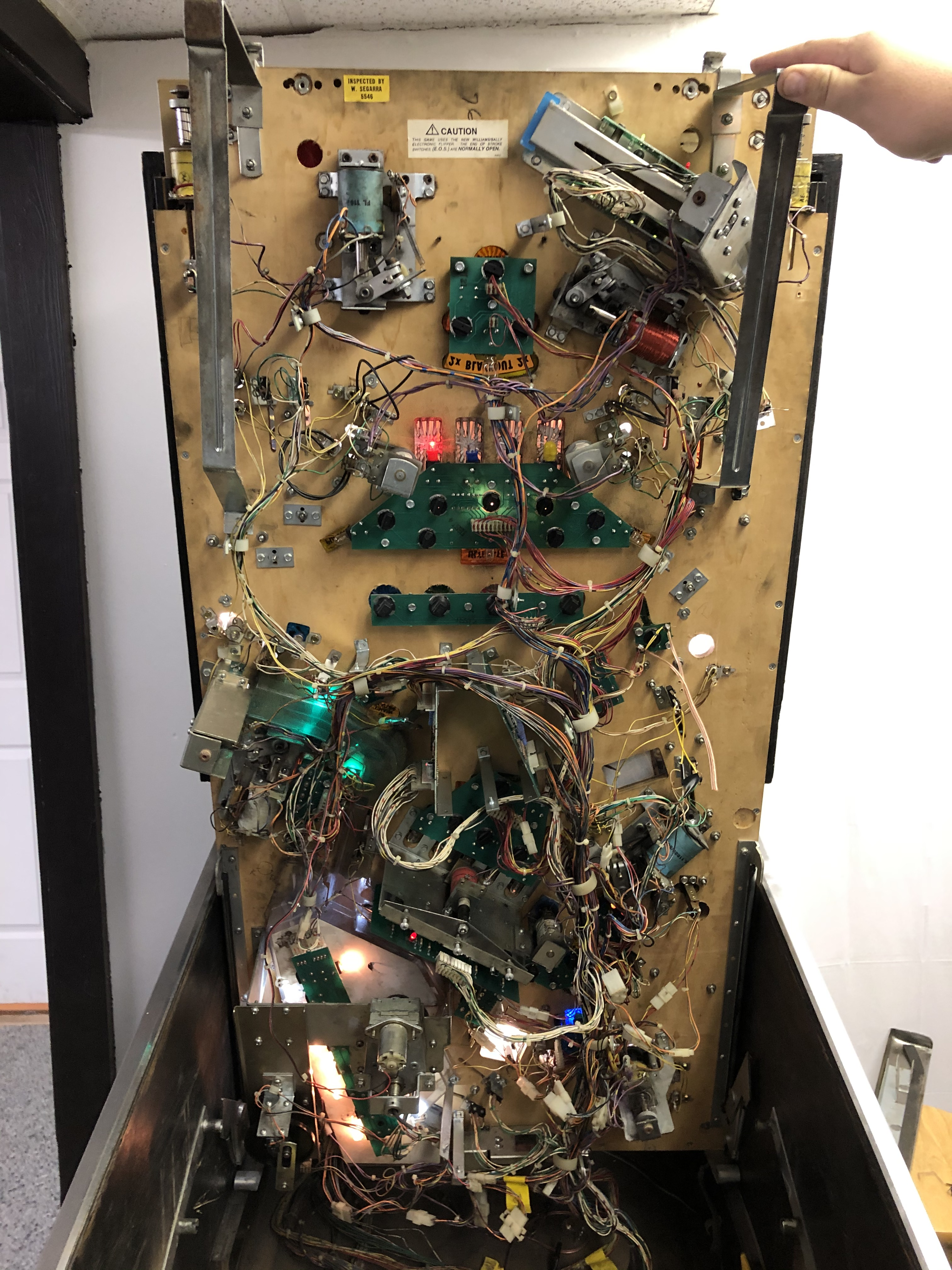
The underside of a 1990s playfield, showing a variety of mechanical and electrical components

The assembly of a pinball machine is a complex process and involves several manual steps.

The wiring for the game's electronic system is a major effort. A color-coded flexible wiring harness is typically soldered to many lamps, switches and solenoids, and connected with plugs to the main electronic circuit boards in modern machines. Technicians are guided by a set of instructions and templates to ensure all wires (that can have a total length of almost half a mile) are installed properly.

The main construction on one hand involves the mounting of mechanical components onto the wooden playfield, such as hammering in anchored metal railing that keeps the balls from exiting the playfield and attachment of plastic parts with nuts and screws. On the other hand, electrical components are installed, like bumpers, slingshots, and sockets for lamps and flashing lights. All of the wiring is fastened to the playfield and big components like speakers, mains transformers or shaker motors are bolted into the bottom of the cabinet. The player-accessible parts like the spring plunger, buttons and the coin door with its mechanics are attached directly to the cabinet.

After successful testing, the playfield is set on hinges into the cabinet. The cabinet of computerized games contains very few parts. On older electromechanical games, the entire floor of the lower box was used to mount custom relays and special scoring switches, making them much heavier. To protect the top of the playfield, tempered glass is slid into side rails and secured with a metal locking bar.

The backbox is installed with hinges on modern machines or screws on older games. It contains the scoring displays and electronic circuit boards and is historically covered with a removable, painted, partially transparent, backglass which defined the game's appeal as much as the playfield design and the cabinet art. Since a damaged backglass is hard to restore, newer games use (sometimes optional) plastic translites behind a clear glass.

Other steps include installation of removable boards with speaker and dot-matrix displays and/or hinged wooden boards with lights and displays. The cabinet and backbox are covered with artwork that was historically sprayed on with stencils and later is applied as full-size decal stickers.

=== Solenoids ===
- Solenoids or coils: These are found in every modern pinball machine since the flipper age. They are usually hidden under the playfield, or covered by playfield components. By applying power to the coil, the magnetic field created by electromagnetism causes a metal object (usually called a plunger) to move. The plunger is then connected mechanically to a feature or accessory on the playfield.

Flipper solenoids contain two coil windings in one package; a short, heavy gage 'power' winding to give the flipper its initial thrust up, and a long, light gage 'hold' winding that uses lower power (and creates far less heat) and essentially just holds the flipper up allowing the player to capture the ball in the inlane for more precise aiming. As the flipper nears the end of its upward travel, a switch under the flipper disconnects the power-winding and leaves only the second sustain winding to hold the flipper up in place. If this switch fails 'open' the flipper will be too weak to be usable, since only the weak winding is available. If it fails 'closed' the coil will overheat and destroy itself, since both windings will hold the flipper at the top of its stroke.

Solenoids also control pop-bumpers, kickbacks, drop target resets, and many other features on the machine. These solenoid coils contain a single coil winding. The plunger size and wire gage & length are matched to the strength required for each coil to do its work, so some types are repeated throughout the game, some are not.

All solenoids and coils used on microprocessor games include a special reverse-biased diode to eliminate a high-voltage pulse of reverse EMF (electromotive force). Without this diode, when the solenoid is de-energized, the magnetic field that was built up in the coil collapses and generates a brief, high-voltage pulse backward into the wiring, capable of destroying the solid-state components used to control the solenoid. Proper wiring polarity must be retained during coil replacement or this diode will act as a dead short, immediately destroying electronic switches. Older electromechanical AC game solenoids do not require this diode, since they were controlled with mechanical switches. However, electromechanical games running on DC do require diodes to protect the rectifier.

All but very old games use low DC voltages to power the solenoids and electronics (or relays). Some microprocessor games use high voltages (potentially hazardous) for the score displays. Very early games used low-voltage AC power for solenoids, requiring fewer components, but AC is less efficient for powering solenoids, causing heavier wiring and slower performance. For locations that suffer from low AC wall outlet voltage, additional taps may be provided on the AC transformer in electromechanical games to permit raising the game's DC voltage levels, thus strengthening the solenoids. Microprocessor games have electronic power supplies that automatically compensate for inaccurate AC supply voltages.

Historically, pinball machines have employed a central fixed I/O board connected to the primary CPU controlled by a custom microcontroller platform running an in-house operating system. For a variety of reasons that include thermal flow, reliability, vibration reduction and serviceability, I/O electronics have been located in the upper backbox of the game, requiring significant custom wiring harnesses to connect the central I/O board to the playfield devices.

A typical pinball machine I/O mix includes 16 to 24 outputs for driving solenoids, motors, electromagnets and other mechanical devices in the game. These devices can draw up to 500 W momentarily and operate at voltages up to 50 Vdc. There is also individually controlled lighting that consists of 64 to 96 individually addressable lights. Recently developed games have switched from incandescent bulbs to LEDs. And there is general illumination lighting that comprises two or more higher-power light strings connected and controlled in parallel for providing broad illumination to the playfield and backbox artwork. Additionally, 12 to 24 high-impulse lighting outputs, traditionally incandescent but now LED, provide flash effects within the game. Traditionally, these were often controlled by solenoid-level drivers.

A game typically includes 64 to 96 TTL-level inputs from a variety of sensors such as mechanical leaf switches, optical sensors and electromagnetic sensors. Occasionally extra signal conditioning is necessary to adapt custom sensors, such as eddy sensors, to the system TTL inputs.

Recently, some pinball manufacturers have replaced some of the discrete control wiring with standard communication buses. In one case, the pinball control system might include a custom embedded network node bus, a custom embedded Linux-based software stack, and a 48-V embedded power distribution system.

=== Custom machines ===
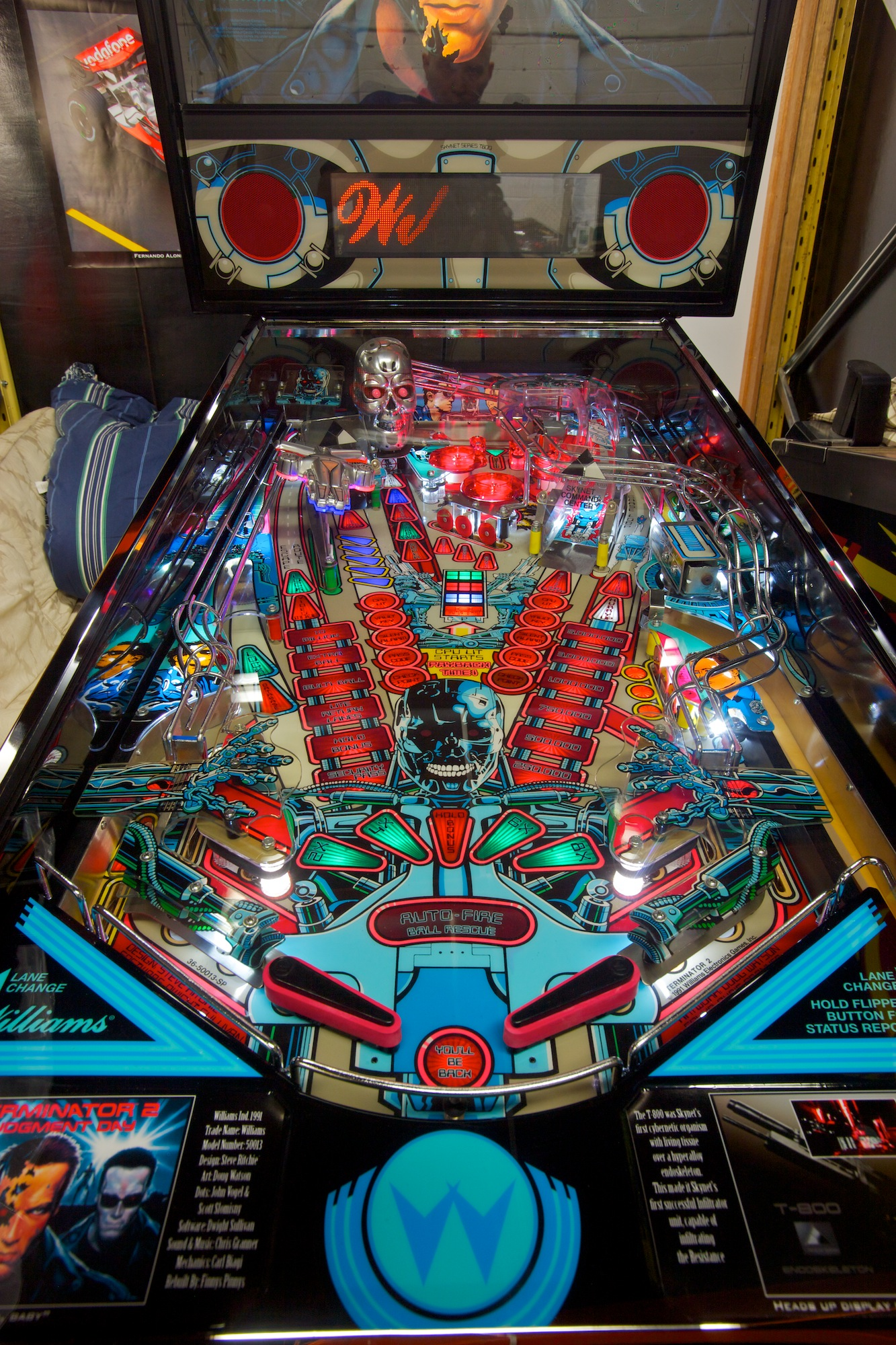
A restored Terminator 2 pinball machine with all metal parts plated with chrome

Some hobbyists and small companies modify existing pinball machines or create their own custom pinball machines. Some want, for example, a game with a specific subject or theme that cannot be bought in this form or was never built at all. Some custom games are built by using the programmable P-ROC controller board. Modifications include the use of ColorDMD that is used to replace the standard mono color dot-matrix displays or the addition of features, e.g. figures or other toys.

A few notable examples of custom pinball machines include a Ghostbusters theme machine, a Matrix style game, Bill Paxton Pinball, Sonic, Star Fox, and Predator machines.

Data East was one of the few regular pinball companies that manufactured custom pinball games (e.g. for Aaron Spelling, Michael Jordan and the movie Richie Rich), though these were basically mods of existing or soon to be released pinball machines (e.g. Lethal Weapon 3 or The Who's Tommy Pinball Wizard).

== Competitions ==
Two Pinball World Championships were held in the Washington, D.C. area in 1972 and 1973 under the auspices of the World Pinball Association which also published a newsletter carrying results of regional tournaments.

In 1974, students at Jersey City State College wanted to make pinball playing a varsity school sport, like football was, so they started a Pinball Club Team to compete against clubs at other schools. They asked two other schools to participate. St. Peter's College took up the challenge, while the other school did not.

Many pinball leagues have formed, with varying levels of competitiveness, formality and structure. These leagues exist everywhere from the Free State Pinball Association (FSPA) in the Washington, D.C. area to the Tokyo Pinball Organization (TPO) in Japan. In the late 1990s, game manufacturers added messages to some games encouraging players to join a local league, providing website addresses for prospective league players to investigate.

Competitive pinball has become increasingly popular in recent years, with the relaunch of both the Professional and Amateur Pinball Association (PAPA) and the International Flipper Pinball Association (IFPA).

Two different systems for ranking pinball players exist. The World Pinball Player Rankings (WPPR) was created by the IFPA. The WPPR formula takes into account the quantity and quality of the players in the field, and awards points based on that calculation for the nearly 200 IFPA endorsed events worldwide. PAPA manages a ranking system known as the PAPA Advanced Rating System (PARS), which uses the Glicko Rating System to mathematically analyze the results of more than 100,000 competitive matches. Since 2008 the IFPA has held a World Championship tournament, inviting the top-ranked WPPR players to compete; the 2019 title holder was Johannes Ostermeier of Germany.

PAPA also designates the winner of the A Division in the annual PAPA World Pinball Championships as the World Pinball Champion. Current Junior (16 and under) and Senior (50 and over) World Champions are Joshua Henderson and Paul McGlone, respectively. Samuel Ogden has become one of the most memorable champions in the PAPA tournaments, winning four straight competitions from 2004 to 2008 in the 50 and over category.

In 2018, the IFPA and Stern Pinball created the Stern Pro Circuit. The top 32 qualifiers in this series are invited to the Stern Pro Circuit Final for an invitation-only, no-entry-fee-required event where all contestants who qualify win prize money.

The popularity of competitive pinball continues to increase with widely adopted tournament rules, standard competition formats and guides for new players.

== Video game simulations ==
Simulating a pinball machine has also been a popular theme of video games. Chicago Coin's TV Pingame (1973) was a digital version of pinball that had a vertical playfield with a paddle at the bottom, controlled by a dial, with the screen filled with simple squares to represent obstacles, bumpers and pockets. This inspired a number of clones, including TV Flipper (1973) by Midway Manufacturing, Exidy's TV Pinball (1974), and Pin Pong (1974) by Atari, Inc. The latter replaced the dial controls with button controls.

Other early pinball video games include Toru Iwatani's Gee Bee (1978), Bomb Bee (1979), and Cutie Q (1979), Tehkan's arcade game Pinball Action (1985), the Atari 2600 game Video Pinball (1981), and David's Midnight Magic (1982). Bill Budge's Pinball Construction Set, released for the Apple II in 1983, allowed the user to create their own simulated pinball machine and play it.

Most early simulations were top-down 2D. As processor and graphics capabilities have improved, more accurate ball physics and 3D pinball simulations have become possible. Tilting has also been simulated, which can be activated using one or more keys (sometimes the space bar) for "moving" the machine. Flipper button computer peripherals were also released, allowing pinball fans to add an accurate feel to their game play instead of using the keyboard or mouse. Modern pinball video games are often based around established franchises such as Metroid Prime Pinball, Mario Pinball Land, Pokémon Pinball, Kirby's Pinball Land, and Sonic Spinball.

Popular pinball simulations of the 1990s include Pinball Dreams, Pro Pinball and 3D Pinball: Space Cadet that was included in Windows 2000 and Windows XP. More recent examples include Pinball FX (2007), Pinball FX 2, Pinball FX 3 and Pinball FX (2023).

There have been pinball programs released for all major home video game and computer systems, tablet computers and smart phones. Pinball video game engines and editors for creation and recreation of pinball machines include for instance Visual Pinball, Future Pinball and Unit3D Pinball.

A BBC News article described virtual pinball games e.g. Zen Pinball and The Pinball Arcade as a way to preserve pinball culture and bring it to new audiences. Another example of preserving historic pinball machines is Zaccaria Pinball that includes digital recreations of classic Zaccaria pinball machines.

In 2022 Flutter released an online pinball game. That same year Google released an Easter Egg pinball game on iOS.

== In popular culture ==
The most famous media about pinball is the rock opera album Tommy (1969) by The Who, which centers on the title character, a "deaf, dumb, and blind kid", who becomes a "Pinball Wizard" and who later uses pinball as a symbol and tool for his messianic mission. The album was subsequently made into a movie and stage musical. The movie features a Gottlieb Kings and Queens machine and Gottlieb Buckaroo machine. Wizard has since moved into popular usage as a term for an expert pinball player.

== See also ==
- List of pinball machines
- List of pinball manufacturers
- List of pinball game designers
- Pinball Hall of Fame – Pinball arcades located in Las Vegas, Nevada.
- Special When Lit – feature documentary about pinball
- John W. Baumgartner, Los Angeles City Council member, 1933–35, opposed pinball machines
- Pinball museum

== Sources ==
- DeLeon, Christopher Lee (May 2012). Arcade-Style Game Design – Pinball's Connections to Coin-Op Videogames (PDF) (Master of Science in Digital Media thesis). Georgia Institute of Technology.
