= David Nutting =

David Nutting may refer to:

- Dave Nutting, American video game designer
- David Nutting (RAF), British intelligence officer during the Second World War
