= The Spirit of '76 (pinball) =

1975 pinball machine

- Manufacturer: Mirco Games, Incorporated
- Release date: October 1975
- Players: 2
- Production run: 127

The Spirit of '76 was the first microprocessor-based production pinball machine, i.e. the first solid state pinball machine. It was released by Mirco Games, Inc. in October 1975. This game should not be confused with Gottlieb's Spirit of 76 pinball machine.

== Technology ==
The game was based on the technology Dave Nutting Associates had created for Bally in 1974 which used Intel's 4004. The firm licensed the technology to Mirco Games in 1975 to create the game, since Bally was not initially interested in the system. The patent was later assigned to Bally whose first solid state pinball machine, Freedom, released in December 1976. The game had a small production run and was regarded as having an unattractive design by critics.

The CPU is a Motorola 6800 with a single 6820 used for I/O. The program memory is stored in ten 93446 512 x 4 bit bipolar PROMs which is no more than 2.5 Kbytes of program memory. RAM is 256 bytes, using two 2112 static RAMs. The CPU, score LEDs, backbox displays, and lamp and solenoid drivers are all contained on the main board. The game is the first pinball machine to use LEDs. The cabinet contains the power supply, and electro-mechanical (EM)-style chime unit.

Maintenance of the game is much easier than on EM games by the inclusion of two diagnostic programs: one turns all bulbs on and checks for errors in switches; the other briefly turns on all solenoids and runs a test on the display. The time the game would be out of service was estimated to be 80-90% less than an EM.

One change from EM games is that solid state games could register all hits of targets whereas EM games could only activate one relay at a time so if multiple targets were hit in quick succession only the first one registered. Reliability was improved and operating costs were reduced by lowering the current to 3.5A at 5V, about 1/10th that on an EM machine. Due to the elimination of stepping switches and relays, and significantly simplifying the "rat's nest" of wiring the machine was 60lb lighter than a typical EM machine which also had the advantage of reducing shipping costs. Darlington transistors are used to activate the 30V solenoids.

== Design and layout ==
Unlike a typical pinball table the legs extend further up the cabinet, almost reaching the metal sides at the top of the cabinet. The backbox uses a design based on the USA flag, but the sides of the backbox are plain white, and the cabinet is plain blue.

The layout is very similar to Gottlieb's 1972 Flying Carpet, with geometry adjusted including moving the slingshots up to create in-lanes. At the top of the machine are four 1-9-7-6 rollovers. Below these are the S-P-I-R-I-T targets which can be hit by bouncing the ball from the 3 pop bumpers just below them. Further down the machine are two side-kickers, and just above the flippers are two triangular slingshots (which the manual for the game calls bumpers).

In a 2-player game the machine could recall game conditions from one ball to the next, which was impossible on an EM machine.

The operator could set it to be played as a 3 or 5 ball game.

The only other pinball games produced by this company were Lucky Draw and Space Fantasy, both cocktail models, in 1978.
