= Johnny Mnemonic (pinball) =

1995 pinball machine

- Johnny Mnemonic pinball flyer
- Manufacturer: Williams Electronic Games, Inc
- Release date: August 1995
- System: Williams WPC Security (WPC-S)
- Players: 4
- Design: George Gomez
- Artwork: John Youssi
- Mechanics: Tom Kopera
- Music: Dave Zabriske
- Multiball: 4
- Production run: 2,756 units

Johnny Mnemonic is a pinball machine designed by George Gomez and released by Williams Electronic Games, Inc in August 1995. Based on the 1995 film of the same name, itself an adaptation of William Gibson's cyberpunk short story, the game introduces innovative mechanics, including a player-controlled magnetic glove and a Cyber Matrix ball lock system. Though overshadowed by the film's commercial struggles, the pinball machine has gained recognition for its fast-paced gameplay and unique features.

== Description ==
Johnny Mnemonic was developed by Williams Electronic Games, Inc., with George Gomez as the lead designer and John Youssi contributing the artwork. Drawing inspiration from Gibson's short story, Gomez also incorporated film elements, such as the magnetic glove used to manipulate the pinball. Released in tandem with the movie, the game's sales suffered due to the film's poor box office performance. Over time, however, it has been celebrated as an underrated gem in the pinball community.

George Gomez, in retrospect, said he should have made the glove move twice as fast.

== Gameplay ==
Johnny Mnemonic is a four-player pinball machine where players complete various objectives and modes. The playfield features standard components—flippers, bumpers, and ramps—augmented by distinctive elements like the Cyber Matrix ball lock system and a magnetic hand assembly.

The Cyber Matrix is a nine-slot grid, with each slot offering a random award that changes per game. Players use the magnetic hand, controlled by the flipper buttons, to pick up the ball and deposit it into a chosen slot. The game includes a "Power Down" wizard mode, where players manage four balls as the machine simulates a shutdown, reminiscent of The Shadow. A "Midnight Madness" mode triggers at midnight based on the machine's clock, delivering a unique play experience.

An interactive Dot Matrix Display features a "Pac-Man-like" creature that players control with the flipper buttons, blending video game elements into the pinball experience.

== Features ==
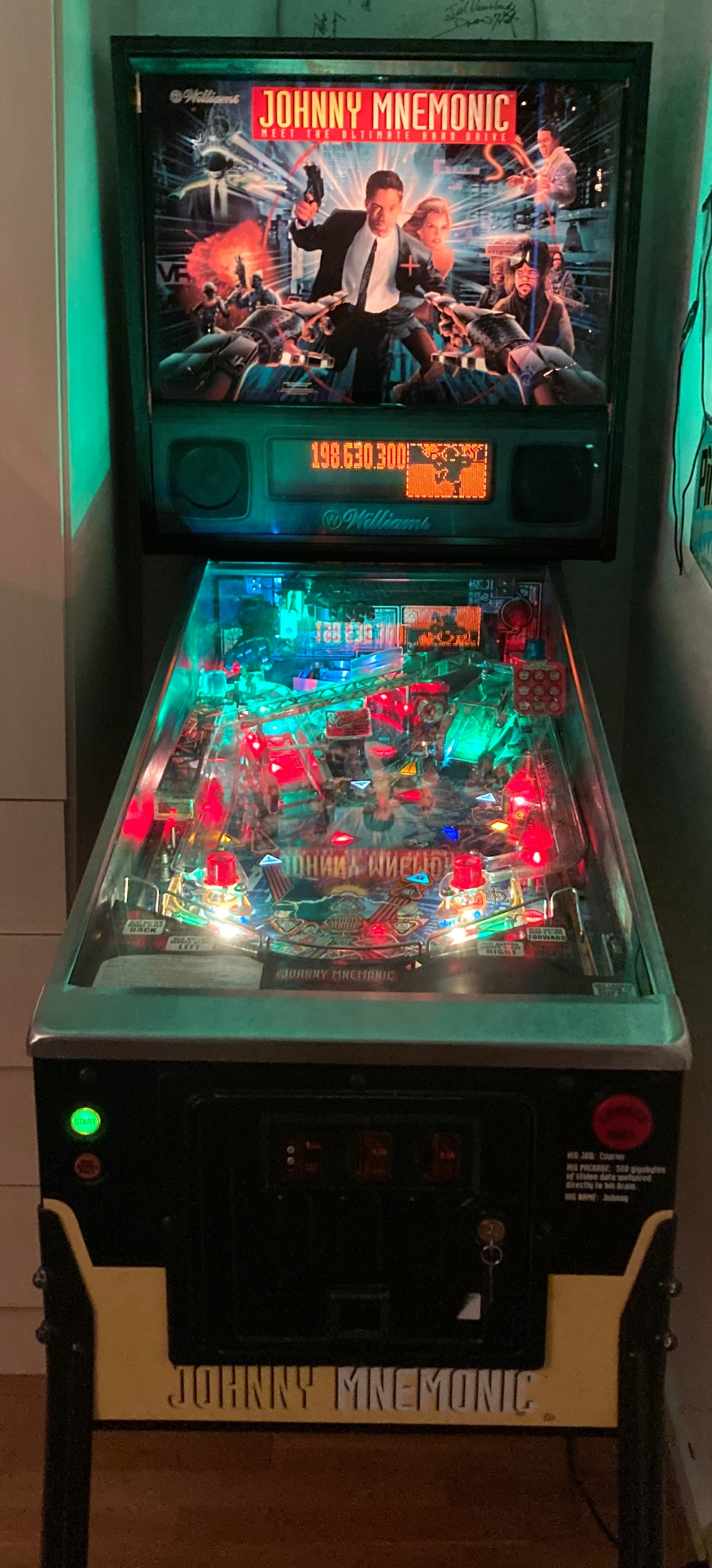

Key features of the game include:

- Cyber Matrix Ball Lock: A system for locking balls into slots to earn variable awards.
- Magnetic Hand Assembly: A player-operated glove that lifts and moves the ball via a magnet.
- Interactive Dot Matrix Display: Allows control of an on-screen character.
- Multiball Modes: Includes the challenging "Power Down" mode with multiple balls.

== Reception ==
Initially hampered by the film's lackluster reception, Johnny Mnemonic has since earned praise from pinball fans. It holds a 7.788/10 rating on Pinside (based on 353 reviews), ranking #106 in the Pinside Pinball Top 100. The Internet Pinball Database reports an average fun rating of 7.8/10 from 108 users.

The game is explored in Adam Ruben's 2017 book Pinball Wizards: Jackpots, Drains, and the Cult of the Silver Ball for its design merits. Andrea Austin's 2007 paper in TEXT Technology commends its stylized cyberspace portrayal and nostalgic appeal.

== Marketing ==
Williams marketed the game with slogans like "Meet the ultimate hard drive," "Gigabytes / Gigabucks," "The Ultimate Mind Game," and "Get Johnny Mnemonic and you'll be in the Mnemoney." A promotional video showcased its features.

In attract mode, the character J-Bone exclaims, "Don't be a zombie — play pinball!" The "Power Down" mode features Steve Ritchie's voice, and audio Easter eggs reference Williams' Funhouse, including Rudy's laugh.
