= Montague Redgrave =

English American game designer

Montague Andrew Elijah Redgrave (July 31, 1844 – 1934) was an English-American game designer who bridged the gap between table Bagatelle and Pinball through his popular "Parlor Table Bagatelle" game. The game was first released around 1871 and possibly went on to influence the creation of the Caille Bros. "Log Cabin" (released around 1902).

Redgrave was born in Lambeth, Surrey, the son of William Redgrave and Sarah Curtis Newberry. He immigrated to New Jersey, where he worked as a grocery manufacturer.

In 1871, he patented the first game that resembles modern pinball, calling it "Improvements in Bagatelles." His design introduced the spring-loaded plunger for launching the pinball.

He died in 1934 in Montclair, New Jersey.
