= Mirco Games =

American electronics manufacturer

Mirco Games Inc.
- Type: Defunct
- Industry: Coin-operated Games
- Founded: December 26, 1973; 52 years ago in Phoenix, Arizona, United States
- Founders: Richard N. Raymond, John L. Walsh
- Defunct: 1980; 46 years ago
- Fate: Sold to Amstar Electronics
- Products: Video games

Mirco Games Inc. was a manufacturer of coin-operated games based in Phoenix, Arizona founded in 1973. The company was a subsidiary of electronics manufacturer Mirco Inc, producing foosball tables and coin-operated video games through the 1970s. They notably created a few of the earliest games incorporating microprocessors, including The Spirit of ’76, the first commercially available pinball utilizing the technology. The company was eventually sold in 1980 to Amstar Electronics.

== History ==
The roots of Mirco Games lie in the company Arizona Automation, an importer of foosball tables founded by Richard “Dick” N. Raymond and John L. Walsh. Walsh and Raymond had worked together at General Electric in Germany and discovered the popularity of foosball in Europe, which had not yet taken off in the United States. Raymond opened Arizona Automation in a 600-square-foot office space in 1970 in Phoenix, Arizona with Walsh serving as the import agent in Germany. Their tables were marketed under the name Champion Soccer. Within a year, Raymond bought out Walsh’s shares in the company.

Subsequently, the German mark suffered in value, leading to Arizona Automation tables domestically. Using manufacturing materials in both the United States and Taiwan, Raymond found great success as the popularity for foosball boomed in the country. Within four years, the company achieved sales of $1 million.

In November 1971, Joe Walsh along with Robert Kessler and Bruce Kinkler formed electronics company Mirco Incorporated, producing both electronics testing hardware and software. To help finance the expansion of this business, Micro purchased the assets of Arizona Automation to get into the coin-op market. On December 26, 1973, Micro Games Inc. was formed with all of Arizona Automation’s staff and product transferred to the new company.

In 1974, Mirco Games published the book Table Soccer Rules and Strategy by Bob and Steve Edgell. One of the earliest books aimed at competitive coin-operated games, the company agreed to publish the book in exchange for one of their tables being featured on the cover. The book helped to spur competitive foosball to new heights, attracting mainstream interest in the craze. Mirco Games itself promoted foosball tournaments, spurring adoption of their tables in large numbers. They eventually captured 10% of the foosball table market. Bob Edgell subsequently joined Mirco Games in a marketing role.

Using their combined expertise in coin-operated games and electronics, Micro Games expanded into electronic games starting in 1973. They first manufactured a number of Pong clones including Champion Ping-Pong (1973) and Challenge (1974). This new revenue stream helped grow the company from $1 million in the foosball trade to $7.3 million in 1975 – $6.1 million of which was from video games. Mirco also offered test equipment services to the coin-op industry through their Mirco Electronic Distributors subsidiary and opened manufacturing plants in Australia and Germany.

Mirco Inc. started exploring early microprocessors after a number of engineers and managers at the company arrived from Motorola, which had released the 8-bit Motorola 6800 microprocessor. In 1975, Mirco Games was approached by engineer David Nutting who had led the project to convert an electro-mechanical pinball table to be powered by a microprocessor. After Nutting shipped Mirco Games one of his prototypes, a team led by former Motorola engineers created The Spirit of ’76 (1975) based on the Motorola 6800 microprocessor.

When shown at the 1975 Music Operators of America show, The Spirit of ’76 was the first commercially available pinball game using a microprocessor. However, Mirco Games had no prior experience manufacturing pinball tables, and the game was not in a finalized state. The initial units shipped in November 1975 were over-engineered and defective, causing a halt to production in March of 1976. The table sold 140 units; its failure caused Mirco to not pursue the pinball business until reentering the market with cocktail table pinball models Space Fantasy and Lucky Draw in 1978. At the same M.O.A. show, Mirco also introduced one of the earliest microprocessor-based video games, PT-109 (1975), utilizing the Fairchild F8 microprocessor – which also sold poorly.

In January 1976, Mirco entered into an agreement with Fairchild Camera & Instrument to create a dedicated home video game console based on their Challenge arcade machine. The deal subsequently fell apart, resulting in a lawsuit over the terms of the agreement in 1977. Micro Inc's financial situation took a serious hit as a result of the game business, with The Spirit of '76, the Fairchild agreement, and the formation of their German subsidiary being blamed for the company's first reported loss in fiscal 1977. This situation led to a firing of 50% of staff and a 10% reduction in pay for those remaining.

The company continued releasing coin-operated video games in a number of genres. These included racing games, flight combat games, and card games. Beginning with 21 (1976), Mirco found a niche in video adaptation of gambling-adjacent “gray market” games. Co-founder of Mirco Inc, John Walsh, went onto form Intermark Industries which distributed gray market video games similar to those produced under Mirco Games.

The last game from the company was published in 1979. In 1980, Mirco Games and Mirco Games GmbH in Germany were sold to Amstar Electronics, licensors of the game Phoenix (1980), whom Mirco had previously done distribution for.

== Products ==
=== Coin-Operated Games ===
==== Foosball Tables ====
- Champion Soccer (1971) as Arizona Automation
- Champion Soccer Club (1973) as Arizona Automation (not coin-operated, sold to the home)
- Grand Champion (1975)
- Grand Champ (1975) (not coin-operated, sold to the home)
- Maverick (1975)
- Grand Champion VI (January 1977)

==== Arcade video games ====
- Champion Ping-Pong (1973) originally released as Arizona Automation, later as Mirco Games.
- Challenge (April 1974)
- Slam (August 1975)
- PT-109 (1975)
- Skywar (May 1976)
- 21 (September 1976)
- Super Stud (December 1976)
- Super 21 (August 1977)
- Formula M Vroom (November 1977)
- Dawn Patrol (June 1978)
- Hold & Draw (1978)
- Break In (1978)
- Hi-Lo Jackpot (1979)

==== Electro-mechanical Games ====
- Scramble (June 1975)

==== Pinball ====
- The Spirit of '76 (October 1975)
- Space Fantasy (March 1978)
- Lucky Draw (June 1978)
