= NBA Fastbreak (pinball) =

1997 pinball machine

- Manufacturer: Williams Electronics Games
- Release date: March 1997
- System: WPC-95
- Design: George Gomez
- Programming: Tom Uban
- Artwork: Kevin O'Connor
- Mechanics: Tom Kopera
- Music: Kevin Quinn
- Sound: Kevin Quinn
- Voices: Tim Kitzrow
- Production run: 4,414

NBA Fastbreak is a 1997 pinball machine released by Williams Electronics Games (under the Bally brand name).

Two machines could be linked together for competitive play. Another machine based on NBA, and called NBA, was released by Stern in 2009, this also had the artwork by Kevin O'Connor.

== Development ==
NBA Fastbreak was one of the last machines released by Bally. The game was designed in a record time of about six months. The design was intended to mirror the experience of playing basketball.

== Gameplay ==
playfield

=== Single machine ===
The game begins with the player selecting one of 29 NBA teams. The scoring is like the real NBA, unlike typical pinball scoring. The objective of NBA Fastbreak is to get to Trophy Multiball by completing six tasks, win a championship ring, and score as many points as possible along the way. The six tasks are:

- Goals (2PT, 3PT & Free Throw)
- 20 points
- Combos (Tip-Off, Slam Dunk, Alley Oop & Fastbreak)
- Stadium Goodies (Crazy Bob's Concessions, Hot-Dog Mania, Scoreboard Trivia & Egyptian Soda)
- Multiballs (Shoot Around Multiball & Around The World Multiball)
- Power Hoops and Power Points (Half Court Hoops, Hook Shot Hoops, Run & Shoot Hoops & Hoops Multiball)

When all the tasks are completed, Trophy Multiball automatically starts (if the player loses the ball before it starts, it will start on the next ball). The player then has unlimited balls for about 20 seconds. The center ramp is lit for 2 points and the goal is to outscore the "other team". If the player wins, a championship ring is awarded.

Unlike scoring for other pinball games, NBA Fastbreak scores purely in basketball-scoring intervals; progress can only be made one, two, or three points at a time, with the exception of the Scoreboard Trivia. Because of this scoring convention, the game scores drastically lower point totals than other games of its era.

=== Linked machines ===
When two machines linked together are played, a single player plays on each machine. Both players have unlimited balls, with drains not counting. The game is timed, and the winner is the player to score the most baskets.
