= Dave Nutting =

American video and pinball game designer (1930–2020)

- Born: December 26, 1930
- Died: September 23, 2020 (aged 89)
- Known for: Western Gun (Gun Fight); Original Jeep Wagoneer

David Judd Nutting (December 26, 1930 – September 23, 2020) was an industrial design engineer who played a role in the early video game industry. He also designed the exterior of the Jeep Wagoneer.

== Career ==
David Judd Nutting was born in 1930 to parents Harold Judd Nutting and Margaret P. Peet in River Forest, Illinois. He was the youngest of four brothers, including the second oldest brother William Gilbert "Bill" Nutting. David came to be interested in engineering, disassembling and reassembling household items to understand how they worked. Despite pressure from his father to become a department store salesman, David joined the Army Corps of Engineers and intended to follow a career path in engineering.

After a year studying at Denison University, Nutting learned about the discipline of industrial design. He switched colleges to the Pratt Institute in their industrial design program, then rejoined the Army Corps of Engineers. Thereafter, he joined prestigious industrial design firm Brook Stevens Associates in Milwaukee, Wisconsin. He worked to design the physical shape of many different items for clients including 3M, Studebaker, cookware for Mirro, tractors for Bolens, and Evinrude Outboard Motors. He also designed one of the first computer-controlled interfaces for milling machines.

In 1961, Brooks Stevens Associates received a contract from Willys to design an update on the concept of the station wagon. Though the initial design parameters called for Detroit automotive style exteriors, Nutting worked on his own time to create a design based on the legacy of the Jeep automobile. His design was subsequently chosen for what was called the Jeep Wagoneer, thereafter inaugurating the category of sport utility vehicles (SUVs).

David became involved with the coin-operated games industry after his brother, Bill Nutting, started as an agent for the Knowledge Computer (1963) electro-mechanical quiz game. The device needed redesigning, so David and his friend Harold Montgomery who worked at engineering firm Cutler-Hammer created a new version of the machine. After a falling out between the brothers, David and Harold decided to form their own company, Nutting Industries, in Milwaukee to distribute their device. They launched their machine I.Q. Computer (1967) to the coin-op industry in 1967, competing with Nutting Associates’ Computer Quiz (1966).

David continued to design the games produced by Nutting Industries, initially different styles of quiz games. Nutting Industries opened a subsidiary called Modec to expand into the teaching machine market outside of the coin-op industry, which wound up as a financial disappointment. Nutting and Montgomery convened to create a traditional electro-mechanical shooting game called Red Baron (1971), which was the final game released by Nutting Industries.

Nutting Industries entered receivership, but David purchased the company’s assets with his personal finances. He formed a new company in 1971 called Milwaukee Coin Industries Inc. (MCI) with partner David Winter, dedicated to producing electro-mechanical games starting with Red Baron. The company did well in the business of arcade games and recruited engineers from the Milwaukee area to help implement David’s game ideas.

In 1972, former Air Force engineer Jeffery Frederiksen began working with MCI as a contractor. Trained in solid-state electronics and computer engineering, Frederiksen was recognized by David Nutting for his technical skill. Nutting increasingly wanted to explore the benefits of solid-state electronics and the two of them collaborated on a game called The Safe (1974) which utilized integrated circuits for the game logic.

Shortly thereafter, David heard about the potential of the Intel microprocessor. Both he and Frederiksen wanted to pursue creating games using the microprocessor, but the executive board of MCI was not interested. In 1972, they had opened their Red Baron Amusement Center arcade locations and increasingly wanted to exit game manufacturing. David was removed from the company, though he allowed them use of the building under his lease as they wound down manufacturing. He and Frederiksen jointly established a new research and development company dedicated to coin-op games located in the back of the building, Dave Nutting Associates.

Their first contact in the industry was with Bally Mfg, who were interested in the proposed application of the microprocessor to their pinball business. Nutting and Frederiksen acquired a development kit for the Intel 4040 microprocessor and obtained a table of Bally’s Flicker (1974) to experiment with. On September 26, 1974, they demonstrated a working unit which ran using a microprocessor, the implementation of which was subsequently patented.

Bally representatives were impressed with the demonstration, but did not produce a pinball game based on the technology. Instead, David offered the design to Mirco Games in Arizona, who produced the pinball table The Spirit of ’76 (1975) which was the first commercial pinball table to use a microprocessor.

Dave Nutting Associates kept close communication with Bally as they continued to work on microprocessor prototypes. After producing a working example of a video game, Bally proposed that Dave Nutting Associates adapt the Taito game Western Gun (1975) to a microprocessor. Dave, working with Fredriksen as hardware designer and University of Milwaukee graduate Tom McHugh as programmer, designed the video game Gun Fight (1975) which became a huge hit and the first commercially successful video game using a microprocessor.

Dave Nutting subsequently designed Sea Wolf (1976) which was the highest grossing arcade video game of 1976 and 1977. Sequels to Western Gun and Sea Wolf – Boot Hill (1977) and Sea Wolf II (1977), respectively – were also successful. Bally purchased Dave Nutting Associates in 1977, moving it to Illinois and allowing Nutting to run a mostly autonomous operation focused around video game development for their subsidiary Midway. They also developed and released the Bally Professional Arcade console, developed by team members at Dave Nutting Associates.

In 1982 John C. Dvorak described Dave Nutting Associates as "one of the leading American companies in arcade-game design". David mentored a number of arcade game designers at his company. These included Alan McNeil, creator of Berzerk (1980), and Jamie Fenton, creator of Gorf (1981). Another employee, Bob Ogdon, later took over development of home games for the Bally Professional Arcade with his company Action Graphics with Nutting’s support. David continued to design arcade games including Wizard of Wor (1981) and quiz game Professor Pac-Man (1983).

Eventually, Dave Nutting Associates was sidelined in favor of Midway’s internal development. David Nutting worked on several unreleased games, including a proposal for the game that eventually became Tron (1982). With home games being developed by Action Graphics and arcade games handled by the Midway team, Bally closed Dave Nutting Associates in 1984. Nutting left the industry and Jeff Frederiksen moved on to work in graphical display technology, which he had worked on as part of his work with the GRASS programming language on the Bally Professional Arcade.

In the following years, Nutting moved to Colorado spent time pursuing interests in aviation. He built an experimental helicopter called Tiger Shark.

David returned to the coin-op industry in 1993, designing a video-based baseball pitching game. He later wrote two books, the quantum mechanics primer Language of Nature: Quantum World Revealed (2005) and the creative motivational book Secrets of a Creative Mind (2012).

David married Phyllis Mason on August 8, 1953. They had a daughter named Elizabeth. He died at his home in Green Valley, Arizona, on September 23, 2020.
