= Star Wars: Episode I – The Phantom Menace =

1999 film by George Lucas

- Theatrical release poster by Drew Struzan
- Directed by: George Lucas
- Written by: George Lucas
- Produced by: Rick McCallum
- Starring: Liam Neeson; Ewan McGregor; Natalie Portman; Jake Lloyd; Ahmed Best; Ian McDiarmid; Anthony Daniels; Kenny Baker; Pernilla August; Frank Oz
- Cinematography: David Tattersall
- Edited by: Paul Martin Smith; Ben Burtt
- Music by: John Williams
- Production company: Lucasfilm Ltd.
- Distributed by: 20th Century Fox
- Release dates: May 16, 1999 (Los Angeles); May 19, 1999 (United States)
- Running time: 134 minutes
- Country: United States
- Language: English
- Budget: $113.8 million
- Box office: $1.047 billion

Star Wars: Episode I – The Phantom Menace is a 1999 American epic space opera film written and directed by George Lucas in his first directorial effort since the original Star Wars, (Note: Later titled Star Wars: Episode IV – A New Hope) released in 1977. Produced by Lucasfilm Ltd. and distributed by 20th Century Fox, (Note: Known as 20th Century Studios for 2024 theatrical re-release) it is the fourth film in the Star Wars film series, the first film of the prequel trilogy and the first chronological chapter of the "Skywalker Saga." The film stars Liam Neeson, Ewan McGregor, Natalie Portman, Jake Lloyd, Ahmed Best, Ian McDiarmid, Anthony Daniels, Kenny Baker, Pernilla August, and Frank Oz. It is set 32 years before the original trilogy, during the era of the Galactic Republic.

The film follows Jedi Master Qui-Gon Jinn and his apprentice Obi-Wan Kenobi as they try to protect Padmé Amidala of Naboo in her mission to resolve an interstellar trade dispute. They also confront the mysterious return of the Sith with the Force-sensitive young slave Anakin Skywalker joining their efforts.

Following the release of Return of the Jedi (1983), talks of a follow-up were proposed, but Lucas was not motivated to return to the franchise. During the hiatus, the backstories he created for the characters, particularly Anakin's, sparked interest in him to develop a prequel trilogy during the 1990s. After he determined that computer-generated imagery (CGI) had advanced to the level he wanted for the prequel trilogy's visual effects, Lucas began writing The Phantom Menace in 1993, and production began in 1994. Filming started in June 1997—at locations at Leavesden Film Studios, at the Royal Palace of Caserta in Italy and the Tunisian desert—and ended in September.

The Phantom Menace was released in theaters on May 19, 1999, almost 16 years after the premiere of Return of the Jedi. The film's premiere was extensively covered by media and was widely anticipated because of the large cultural following the Star Wars saga had cultivated. Upon its release, The Phantom Menace received mixed reviews from critics. While the visual effects and action sequences were praised, criticism was largely focused on its exposition and characters—particularly Jar Jar Binks.

The film was a box-office success and broke numerous records. It grossed $924 million worldwide during its initial theatrical run, becoming the highest-grossing film of 1999, the second-highest-grossing film of all-time, and the third-highest in North America (behind Titanic and Star Wars), as well as the highest-grossing Star Wars film at the time (not factoring in inflation). The film has been re-released several times, including a 2012 3D reissue which brought its overall worldwide gross to over $1 billion. Attack of the Clones (2002) and Revenge of the Sith (2005) followed The Phantom Menace, rounding out the Star Wars prequel trilogy.

== Plot ==
The Trade Federation blockades the planet Naboo in secret preparation for a full-scale invasion, disrupting order in the Galactic Republic. The Republic's leader, Supreme Chancellor Finis Valorum, dispatches Jedi Master Qui-Gon Jinn and his apprentice Obi-Wan Kenobi to negotiate with Trade Federation Viceroy Nute Gunray. Darth Sidious, a Sith Lord and the Trade Federation's secret benefactor, orders the Viceroy to kill the Jedi and begin their invasion with an army of battle droids. Qui-Gon and Obi-Wan escape and flee to Naboo. Amid the invasion, Qui-Gon rescues a bumbling Gungan outcast, Jar Jar Binks. Qui-Gon and Obi-Wan fail to persuade the Gungan leader Boss Nass to aid the planet's surface dwellers, but they secure Jar Jar's guidance and underwater transport to Theed, Naboo's capital city. After rescuing Queen Padmé Amidala, the group escapes Naboo aboard her royal starship, intending to reach the Republic capital, the ecumenopolis planet of Coruscant.

The ship is damaged while passing through the Federation blockade. Still, astromech droid R2-D2 spares it from destruction, and the group lands on the outlying desert planet of Tatooine, beyond the Republic's jurisdiction, for repairs. Qui-Gon, Jar Jar, R2, and Padmé, disguised as one of her own handmaidens, visit the settlement of Mos Espa to purchase a new part for the hyperdrive. They meet a junk dealer, Watto, and his nine-year-old slave, Anakin Skywalker, a gifted pilot and engineer who built a protocol droid, C-3PO. Qui-Gon senses a strong presence of the Force within Anakin and is convinced he is the prophesied "Chosen One," destined to restore balance to the Force. With Watto refusing to accept payment in Republic currency, Qui-Gon wagers both the required hyperdrive part and Anakin's freedom on a podrace. Anakin wins the race and joins the group to be trained as a Jedi, leaving behind his mother, Shmi, as is the Jedi way. En route to their starship, Darth Maul, Sidious's apprentice, attacks Qui-Gon after being sent to capture Amidala. After a brief lightsaber duel, Qui-Gon escapes on board the starship with the others.

Qui-Gon and Obi-Wan escort Padmé to Coruscant so she can plead her people's case to Valorum and the Galactic Senate. Qui-Gon asks the Jedi Council for permission to train Anakin as a Jedi, but the Council refuses, concerned that Anakin is vulnerable to the dark side of the Force due to his age. Undaunted, Qui-Gon vows to train Anakin anyway. Naboo's Senator Palpatine persuades Amidala to call for a vote of no confidence in Valorum to elect a more capable leader and to resolve the crisis. Though she pushes the vote through, Amidala grows frustrated with the Senate's corruption and decides to return to Naboo. The Jedi Council orders Qui-Gon and Obi-Wan to accompany the queen and investigate the return of the Sith, whom they believed extinct for more than a millennium.

On Naboo, Padmé reveals herself as the queen before the Gungans and persuades them to join in an alliance against the Trade Federation. Jar Jar is promoted to general and joins his tribe in a battle against the droid army, while Padmé leads the search for Gunray in Theed. During a hangar battle, Anakin flees to a starfighter and accidentally triggers its autopilot, traveling to the battle against the Federation droid control ship and inadvertently causing its destruction from within, which deactivates the droid army. Meanwhile, Darth Maul infiltrates the Theed Palace and engages Qui-Gon and Obi-Wan in a lightsaber duel. Maul fatally impales Qui-Gon with his double-bladed lightsaber, before being bisected by Obi-Wan and falling down a shaft. Before Qui-Gon dies, he asks Obi-Wan to train Anakin.

The Republic arrests Gunray, and Palpatine is elected as Chancellor. Jedi Grand Master Yoda promotes Obi-Wan to Jedi Knight and reluctantly accepts Anakin as Obi-Wan's apprentice. That evening, at Qui-Gon's funeral, Yoda contemplates the likelihood of a second Sith Lord beyond Maul, given legends that Sith Lords always have a master. The following day, they celebrate their victory on Naboo and the reconciliation of the Gungans and Naboo, and Padmé rewards Boss Nass with a peace-making trophy.

== Cast ==
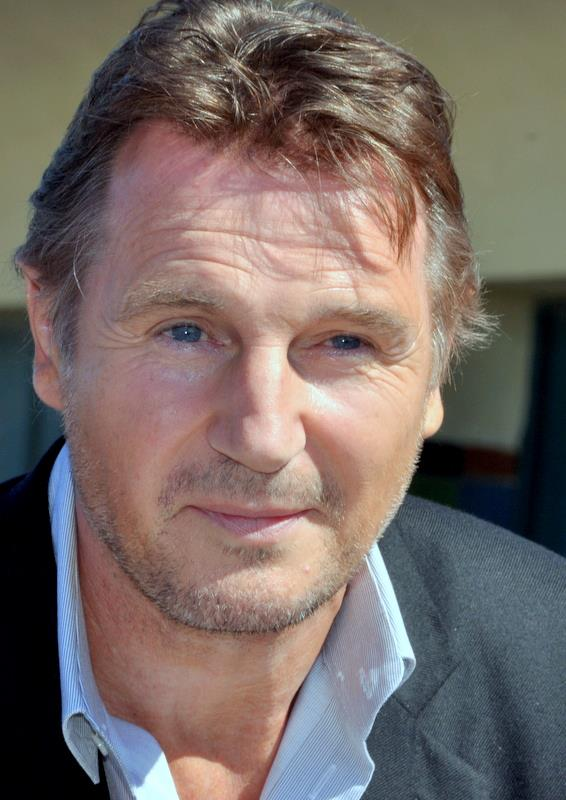
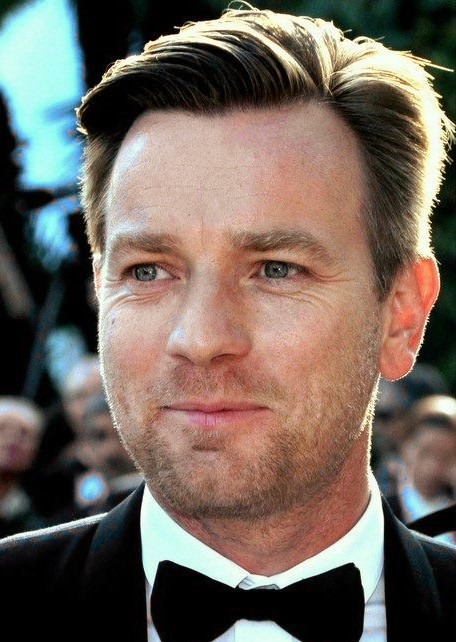
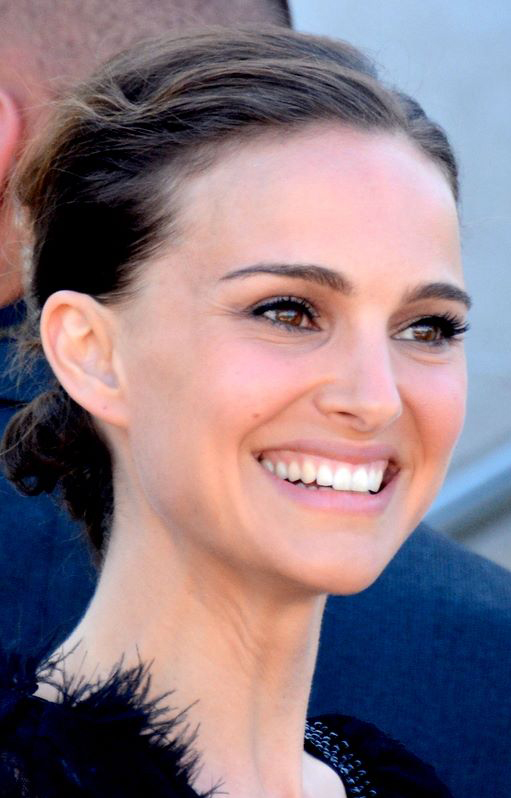
Left to right: Liam Neeson (pictured in 2012), Ewan McGregor (2012) and Natalie Portman (2015)
- Liam Neeson as Qui-Gon Jinn, a Jedi Master who discovers Anakin Skywalker and under the belief that the boy is destined to bring balance to the force as the prophesied "Chosen One", insists that he be trained as a Jedi, despite the Jedi Council's refusal to do so. Lucas originally wanted to cast an American actor in the role but cast Neeson (who is Irish) because he considered that Neeson had great skills and presence. Lucas said Neeson was a "master actor, who the other actors will look up to, who has got the qualities of strength that the character demands".
- Ewan McGregor as Obi-Wan Kenobi, Qui-Gon's twenty-five-year-old Jedi Padawan, who holds his master in high regard but questions his motives at times, especially when it seems he is breaking the rules of the Jedi. McGregor was cast from a shortlist of fifty actors, all of whom had to be compared to pictures of young Alec Guinness, who portrayed the elderly Obi-Wan, to make a believable younger version. McGregor had a vocal coach to help his voice sound closer to Guinness's. He also studied several of Guinness's performances, from his early work and the original Star Wars films. McGregor said, "[We] had a lot of work to do to establish the plot and set up the saga as a whole, such as introducing the idea of the Senate and the Jedi."
- Natalie Portman as Padmé Amidala, the fourteen-year-old Queen of Naboo, who hopes to protect her planet from the Trade Federation's blockade invasion. Throughout most of the film, she uses her birth name Padmé Naberrie and poses as one of the queen's handmaidens for protection. Over 200 actresses auditioned for the role. The production notes stated that "The role required a young woman who could be believable as the ruler of that planet, but at the same time be vulnerable and open." He stated, "I was looking for someone who was young, strong, along the lines of Leia [and] Natalie embodied all those traits and more." Portman was unfamiliar with Star Wars before being cast, but was enthusiastic about being cast as a character she expected to become a role model. Portman said, "It was wonderful playing a young queen with so much power. I think it will be good for young women to see a strong woman of action who is also smart and a leader."
- Jake Lloyd as Anakin "Ani" Skywalker, a nine-year-old slave boy and a skilled pilot who dreams of becoming a Jedi. Hundreds of actors were tested across the UK, Ireland, Canada and the United States before the producers settled on Lloyd, who Lucas considered met his requirements of "a good actor, enthusiastic and very energetic". Producer Rick McCallum said that Lloyd was "smart, mischievous, and loves anything mechanical—just like Anakin".
- Ahmed Best as Jar Jar Binks, a clumsy Gungan exiled from his home and taken in by Qui-Gon and Obi-Wan. Best was hired after casting director Robin Gurland saw him on a Stomp performance in San Francisco. Best was originally intended to provide motion capture data only, but his offer to voice the character was accepted. On the set, to provide references for the actors, Best was clothed in a suit made of foam and latex and a headpiece. Best's filmed performance was later replaced with the computer-generated character. Best frequently improvised movements to make Jar Jar look as clumsy and comedic as possible.
- Pernilla August as Shmi Skywalker, Anakin's mother, who is concerned for her son's future but allows him to leave with the Jedi. August, a veteran of Swedish cinema, was chosen after auditioning with Liam Neeson. She was afraid of being rejected because of her accent.
- Ian McDiarmid as Palpatine / Darth Sidious, a middle-aged senator of Naboo and a secret Sith Lord who orchestrates the invasion of his home planet to get elected Supreme Chancellor. He is the Trade Federation's mysterious benefactor, and the titular "Phantom Menace". In a 1998 interview for Star Wars Insider, McDiarmid said he was surprised when Lucas approached him sixteen years after Return of the Jedi to reprise the role of Palpatine, having assumed that a younger actor would play the role in the prequel films.
- Anthony Daniels as C-3PO, a protocol droid built by Anakin. He lacks a metal covering in this film; R2-D2 humorously refers to it as being "naked". Industrial Light & Magic's Michael Lynch, dressed in a color closely matching the background—in a manner similar to the Japanese puppet theater Bunraku—manipulated a skeletal C-3PO figure attached to his front while Daniels read his lines off-camera. The puppeteer was erased from the film during post-production. Lucas told Daniels that his character was created by Anakin while discussing the plot line at Leavesden Studios in 1997.
- Kenny Baker as R2-D2, an astromech droid from Naboo that saves Queen Amidala's ship when other astro droids fail. Before the film's production started, fans campaigned on the Internet to retain Baker as R2-D2; Lucas replied that the actor would reprise the role. Baker is used for scenes where R2-D2 bends forwards and backwards and wobbles from side-to-side. Robots and a digital model were used in other shots.
- Frank Oz as Yoda, the centuries-old Jedi Grandmaster and head of the Jedi Council who is apprehensive about allowing Anakin to be trained. Yoda was mostly portrayed as a puppet designed by Nick Dudman based on Stuart Freeborn's original design. Oz controlled the puppet's mouth, and other parts were controlled by puppeteers using remote controls. Lucas fitted Yoda's filming around Oz's schedule as he finished and promoted In & Out. A computer-generated Yoda is featured in two distant shots. Warwick Davis (who played the part of the Ewok Wicket W. Warrick in Return of the Jedi in 1983) portrays him in the scene where Obi-Wan becomes a Jedi Knight. Lucas said he originally wanted to use a full-time digital Yoda, but the attempts did not work well enough at the time. Beginning with the 2011 Blu-ray release of The Phantom Menace, which was also used for the 3D reissue, a CG Yoda replaced the puppet entirely.
- Oliver Ford Davies as Sio Bibble, the governor of Naboo.
- Hugh Quarshie as Captain Quarsh Panaka, Queen Amidala's chief of security at the Theed Palace.
- Samuel L. Jackson as Mace Windu, a Jedi Master and high-ranking member of the Jedi Council who opposes training Anakin.
- Ray Park / Peter Serafinowicz (voice) as Darth Maul, Darth Sidious's Zabrak Sith apprentice, who wields a double-bladed lightsaber. Park also played as one of the Royal Guards of Naboo.
- Terence Stamp as Finis Valorum, the Supreme Chancellor of the Galactic Republic who commissions Obi-Wan and Qui-Gon to negotiate with the Trade Federation viceroy. Lucas described the character as a "good man but he's beleaguered—a bit like [Bill] Clinton".
- Keira Knightley as Sabé, one of Queen Amidala's handmaidens who serves as her decoy throughout the majority of the film.
- Silas Carson as:
  - Nute Gunray, the viceroy of the Trade Federation who leads Naboo's invasion and tries to force Queen Amidala to sign a treaty to legitimize their occupation of the planet.
  - Ki-Adi-Mundi, a wise and powerful Jedi Master who sits on the council.
  - Lott Dod, a Trade Federation Senator.
  - Antidar Williams, co-pilot of the Radiant VII. This was the role for which Carson originally auditioned.
- Jerome St. John Blake as:
  - Rune Haako, Gunray's chief lieutenant and Settlement Officer in the Trade Federation.
    - James Taylor as the voice of Rune Haako.
  - Oppo Rancisis, a Jedi Master and member of the council.
  - Orn Free Taa, a Twi-lek senator.
  - Mas Amedda, a Chagrian politician and Vice Chair of the galactic senate.

Additionally, Brian Blessed voiced Boss Nass, the leader of the Gungan tribe who allies with the Naboo surface dwellers; Andy Secombe voiced Watto, a junk dealer on Tatooine who owns Anakin and his mother as slaves; and Lewis MacLeod voiced Sebulba, an aggressive, scheming podracer who is Anakin's main rival at the Boonta Eve podrace. Greg Proops and Scott Capurro voiced Fode and Beed, respectively, the two-headed announcer of the Boonta Eve Race. Alan Ruscoe appears as Jedi Master Plo Koon and Neimoidian Daultay Dofine, commander of the Trade Federation's droid control ships. Ralph Brown plays Ric Olie, commander of the Naboo Royal Space Fighter Corps and chief pilot aboard Queen Amidala's starship, while Matthew Wood appears as the Twi'lek Bib Fortuna alongside a CGI Jabba the Hutt, who is voiced by Ben Burtt. Dominic West plays the role of Jerus Jannick a Naboo Palace Guard, Celia Imrie appears as a fighter pilot, and Sofia Coppola appears as Saché, one of Amidala's handmaidens. Christian Simpson appears as Lieutenant Gavyn Sykes. Lindsay Duncan voices TC-14, a protocol droid on the Federation ship. Sally Hawkins made her screen debut as an uncredited villager. Mark Hamill's son, Nathan makes a cameo appearance as one of the Royal Guards of Naboo.

== Production ==
=== Development ===
While writing the original Star Wars film (1977), George Lucas decided the story was too vast to be covered in one film. He introduced a wider story arc that could be told in sequels if it became successful. He negotiated a contract that allowed him to make two sequels, and over time created an elaborate backstory to aid his writing process. While writing the second film, The Empire Strikes Back (1980), Lucas considered directions in which to take the story. In the original trilogy, Darth Vader was revealed to have been Anakin Skywalker, a once-powerful Jedi Knight, and a traitor to the Jedi Order. With this backstory in place, Lucas decided that the movies would work best as a trilogy. In the trilogy's final episode, Return of the Jedi (1983), Vader is redeemed through an act of sacrifice for Luke.

In the early 1980s, Mark Hamill and Anthony Daniels discussed the potential prequels with the BBC. In 1980, Hamill said after finishing the trilogy, they would "go back 20 years" and focus on stories of a young Darth Vader and young Obi-Wan Kenobi and hinted that a five or six year old Luke Skywalker could appear in the third prequel preceding A New Hope. In 1983, Daniels said Jedi gave the original trilogy a sense of closure with "no leftovers" and indirectly mentioned the potential prequels saying, "if there's anymore they're go back in time."

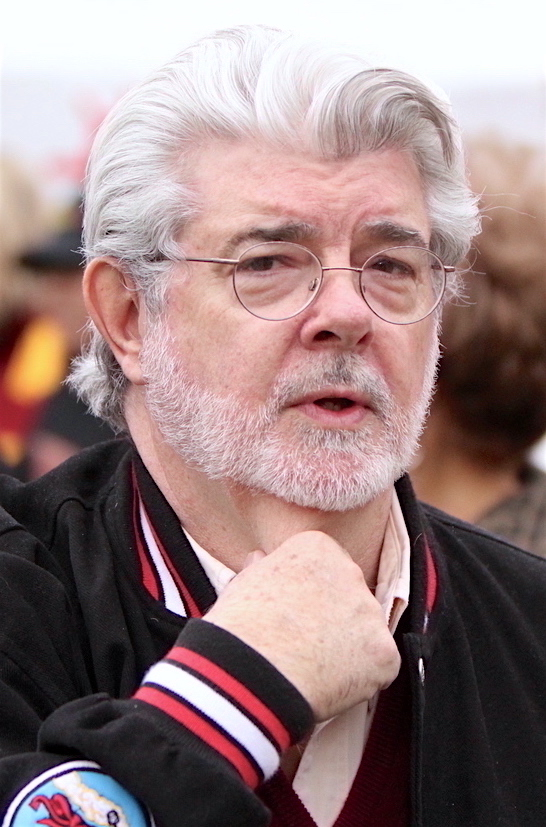
Star Wars creator George Lucas (pictured in 2011) decided to return to the series in the 1990s following advancements in computer-generated imagery.

Throughout the 1980s, Lucas said he had no desire to return to Star Wars and had canceled his sequel trilogy by the time of Return of the Jedi. However, because Lucas had developed most of the backstory, the idea of prequels continued to fascinate him. In the early 1990s, Star Wars saw a resurgence in popularity in the wake of Dark Horse's comic line and Timothy Zahn's trilogy of novels. (Note: Coruscant was first described in the Legends novel, Heir to the Empire and made its first live-action appearance in the 1997 Special Edition release of Return of the Jedi.) Lucas saw that there was still a large audience for his idea of a prequel trilogy, and with the development of special effects generated with computer-generated imagery (CGI), Lucas considered returning to his saga and directing the film. In October 1993, it was announced in Variety and other sources that he would be making the prequels. Lucas began outlining the story; Anakin Skywalker rather than Obi-Wan Kenobi would be the protagonist, and the series would be a tragedy examining Darth Vader's origins. A relic of the original outline was that Anakin would, like his son, grow up on Tatooine. Lucas also began to change the prequels' timeline relative to the original series; instead of filling in the tangential history, they would form the beginning of a long story that started with Anakin's childhood and ended with his death. This was the final step toward turning the franchise into a saga.

Lucas began writing the Star Wars prequel trilogy on November 1, 1994. The screenplay of Star Wars was adapted from Lucas's 15-page outline that was written in 1976, which he designed to help him keep track of the characters' backstories and events that occurred before the original trilogy. Anakin was first written as a twelve-year-old, but Lucas reduced his age to nine because he felt that the lower age would better fit the plot point of Anakin being affected by his mother's separation from him. Eventually, Anakin's younger age led Lucas to rewrite his participation in the movie's major scenes. The film's working title was The Beginning, with the title not being changed to The Phantom Menace until shortly before the film's completion. Lucas later revealed that the Phantom Menace title was a reference to Palpatine hiding his true identity as an evil Sith Lord behind the facade of a well-intentioned public servant.

The larger budget and possibilities opened up by the use of digital effects made Lucas "think about a much grander, more epic scale—which is what I wanted Star Wars to be". The story ended with five simultaneous, ongoing plots, one leading to another. The central plot is Palpatine's intent to become Chancellor, which leads to the Trade Federation's attack on Naboo, the Jedi being sent there, Anakin being met along the way, and the rise of the Sith Lords. As with the original trilogy, Lucas intended The Phantom Menace to illustrate several themes throughout the narrative. Duality is a frequent theme; Amidala is a queen who passes as a handmaiden, Palpatine plays on both sides of the war, among others. "Balance" is frequently suggested; Anakin is supposedly "the one" chosen to bring balance to the Force—Lucas said, "Anakin needed to have a mother, Obi-Wan needed a Master, Darth Sidious needed an apprentice" as without interaction and dialogue, "you wouldn't have drama."

In November 2015, Ron Howard confirmed that he, Robert Zemeckis and Steven Spielberg were approached by Lucas to direct The Phantom Menace. All three approached directors told Lucas that he should direct the film, as they each found the project "too daunting."

=== Pre-production and design ===
Before Lucas had started writing, his producing partner Rick McCallum was preparing for the film. McCallum stated that his experience with The Young Indiana Jones Chronicles led to many of his decisions on The Phantom Menace, such as long-term deals with actors and soundstages, the employment of recent graduates with no film experience, and the creation of sets and landscapes with digital technology. In April 1994, McCallum started searching for artists in art, architecture and design schools, and in mid-year he began location scouting with production designer Gavin Bocquet. Industrial Light & Magic (ILM) art director Doug Chiang impressed McCallum the most and was hired as the design director. Art development on the film began in January 1995.

Within three to four months of Lucas beginning the writing process, Chiang and his design team started a two-year process of reviewing thousands of designs for the film. Chiang stated that Lucas intended Episode I to be stylistically different from the other Star Wars films; it would be "richer and more like a period piece, since it was the history leading up to A New Hope." The story takes place on three planets, some with varied environments such as the human and Gungan cities of Naboo and three buildings in Coruscant. With the exception of the Gungan city, which had an Art Nouveau-inspired visual, these locations would be given distinctive looks with some basis in the real world. The concept drawings of Ralph McQuarrie for the original trilogy served as the basis for Mos Espa—which was also inspired by old Tunisian hotels and buildings and had touches such as a marketplace to differentiate it from A New Hope's Mos Eisley—and Coruscant, in particular a metropolis design that became the basis for the Senate. Bocquet would later develop the work of Chiang's team and design the interiors, translating the concepts into construction blueprints with environments and architectural styles that had some basis in reality "to give the audience something to key into." Some elements were directly inspired by the original trilogy; Lucas described the battle droids as predecessors to the stormtroopers. Chiang uses that orientation to base the droids on the Imperial soldiers, only in the same style of stylized and elongated features seen in tribal African art.

Terryl Whitlatch, who had a background on zoology and anatomy, was in charge of creature design. Many of the aliens are hybrids, combining features of real animals. At times, entire food chains were developed, even though only a small percentage of them would appear in the film. Whitlatch also designed detailed skeletons for the major characters and facial muscles on Jar Jar Binks as a reference for ILM's animators. Each creature would reflect its environment; those on Naboo were more beautiful because the planet is "lush and more animal-friendly", Tatooine has rough-looking creatures "with weather-beaten leathery skin to protect them from the harsh desert elements", and Coruscant has bipedal, human-looking aliens.

The film made extensive use of the new technique of digital pre-visualization, using computers to essentially create 3D animated storyboards. This was done for dozens of scenes in the film but was first and primarily used in the pod race sequence. Animatic supervisor David Dozoretz, also an ILM alum, worked on this sequence for nearly three years, and at one point had a 25-minute version of the race, although the film only included a 9-minute version.

Qui-Gon Jinn and Obi-Wan Kenobi dueling Darth Maul. Lucas wanted the lightsaber battles to be fast and more intense than those of the original trilogy, depicting the Jedi in their prime. This scene was highly praised by critics and audiences.

Stunt coordinator Nick Gillard was recruited to create a new Jedi fighting style for the prequel trilogy. Gillard likened the lightsaber battles to a chess game "with every move being a check." Because of their short-range weapons, Gillard thought that the Jedi would have had to develop a fighting style that merged every sword fighting style, such as kendo and other kenjutsu styles, with other swinging techniques, such as tennis swings and tree-chopping. While training Liam Neeson and Ewan McGregor, Gillard wrote a sequence that lasted around 60 seconds and intended to be around five or six sequences per fight. Lucas later referred to the Jedi as "negotiators" rather than high-casualty soldiers. The preference of hand-to-hand combat was intended to give a spiritual and intellectual role to the Jedi. Because Gillard thought that the stunt jumps with the actors and stuntmen dangling from wires did not look realistic, air rams were used to propel them into the air instead.

Lucas decided to make elaborate costumes, because the film's society was more sophisticated than the one depicted in the original trilogy. Designer Trisha Biggar and her team created over 1,000 costumes that were inspired by various cultures. Biggar worked closely with concept designer Iain McCaig to create a color palette for the inhabitants of each world: Tatooine followed A New Hope with sun-bleached sand colors, Coruscant had grays, browns and blacks, and Naboo had green and gold for humans while Gungans wore "a leathery look, like their skin." The Jedi costumes followed the tradition from the original film; Obi-Wan's costume was inspired by the costume that was worn by Guinness. Lucas said he and Biggar would look at the conceptual art to "translat[e] all of these designs into cloth and fabric and materials that would actually work and not look silly." Biggar also consulted Gillard to ensure that the costumes would accommodate action scenes, and consulted the creature department to find which fabrics "wouldn't wear too heavily" on the alien skins. A huge wardrobe department was set up at Leavesden Film Studios to create over 250 costumes for the main actors and 5,000 for the background ones. McCaig initially designed Darth Maul as a cross "between a ghost and a serial killer" after he was given a piece of the script where it stated "give me your worst nightmare", but when Lucas saw the design, it terrified him. He closed the book and told McCaig "give me your second worst nightmare." McCaig later based Darth Maul's design on Bozo the Clown.

Nute Gunray's Thai accent was chosen after Lucas and McCallum listened to various languages to decide how the Neimoidians would speak. The character design of Watto was an amalgam of rejected ideas; his expressions were based on video footage of Secombe's voice acting, photographs of animation supervisor Rob Coleman imitating the character, and modeler Steve Alpin saying Watto's lines to a mirror. Lucas described Sebulba's design as "a spider crossed with an orangutan crossed with a sloth", with a camel-like face, and clothing inspired by medieval armor.

=== Casting ===
Samuel L. Jackson expressed interest in appearing in a Star Wars film in any role, including as a Stormtrooper. He was approached after casting director Robin Gurland suggested Jackson to Lucas and accepted; his role was kept secret from him until his first day on set where he found out he is playing Mace Windu. Tupac Shakur was also considered for the role of Mace Windu. Ray Park, a martial arts champion with experience in gymnastics and sword fighting, was originally a member of the stunt crew. Stunt coordinator Nick Gillard filmed Park to demonstrate his conception of the lightsaber battles. Lucas and McCallum were so impressed with the test tape that they gave Park the role of Maul. His voice was considered "too squeaky" and was dubbed over in post-production by Peter Serafinowicz. Keira Knightley's parents tried to convince her not to audition, but she still sought a role since she was a Star Wars fan. The casting was influenced by Knightley's remarkable similarity to Natalie Portman, with Knightley admitting their mothers could not tell them apart. Knightley was reported to have "cried every single day" due to finding the wardrobe uncomfortable.

Over 3,000 actors auditioned for the role of Anakin Skywalker including Haley Joel Osment, Cameron Finley, Justin Berfield and Michael Angarano before Jake Lloyd was selected. Vinette Robinson auditioned for the role of Padmé Amidala. Benicio del Toro was initially cast as Darth Maul before later leaving the project when the character's lines were cut. Michael Jackson expressed interest in playing Jar Jar Binks, but he wanted to do it in prosthetic makeup while Lucas wanted to do it in CGI. Joseph Fiennes auditioned for the role of Obi-Wan Kenobi and nearly landed the part until Lucas's daughter rejected him upon meeting him during the second level of auditioning. According to McCaig, in the first draft of the script Neeson's character was originally named Obi-Wan Kenobi and McGregor's character was named Qui-Gon Jinn; with the young Qui-Gon taking on the name of Obi-Wan upon the elder Jedi's death. However, these roles were reversed late in filming.

Silas Carson was cast as Nute Gunray because another actor was uncomfortable with the costumes used by the Trade Federation characters, which were hot, exerted a lot of pressure on the bearer, and took about 15 minutes to apply. Hugh Quarshie considered the part of Panaka as "a good career move" and a production that would be fun to make. Brian Blessed originally auditioned for the role of Sio Bibble, the Governor of Naboo, for which he was considered "too loud." Casting director Robin Gurland approached him to play Nass because it was a "bigger than life" character with "a kind of bravado." Blessed described Nass as a "reluctant hero." Sofia Coppola, daughter of Lucas' long-time friend and creative partner Francis Ford Coppola, considers Lucas as "like an uncle to me." As she prepared the script for her directorial debut The Virgin Suicides, Coppola heard Lucas would be making a new Star Wars film and asked him if she could accompany him during filming. Lucas offered Coppola a role in the royal entourage, which she accepted because it "seemed like a good vantage point to watch without getting in the way."

=== Filming ===
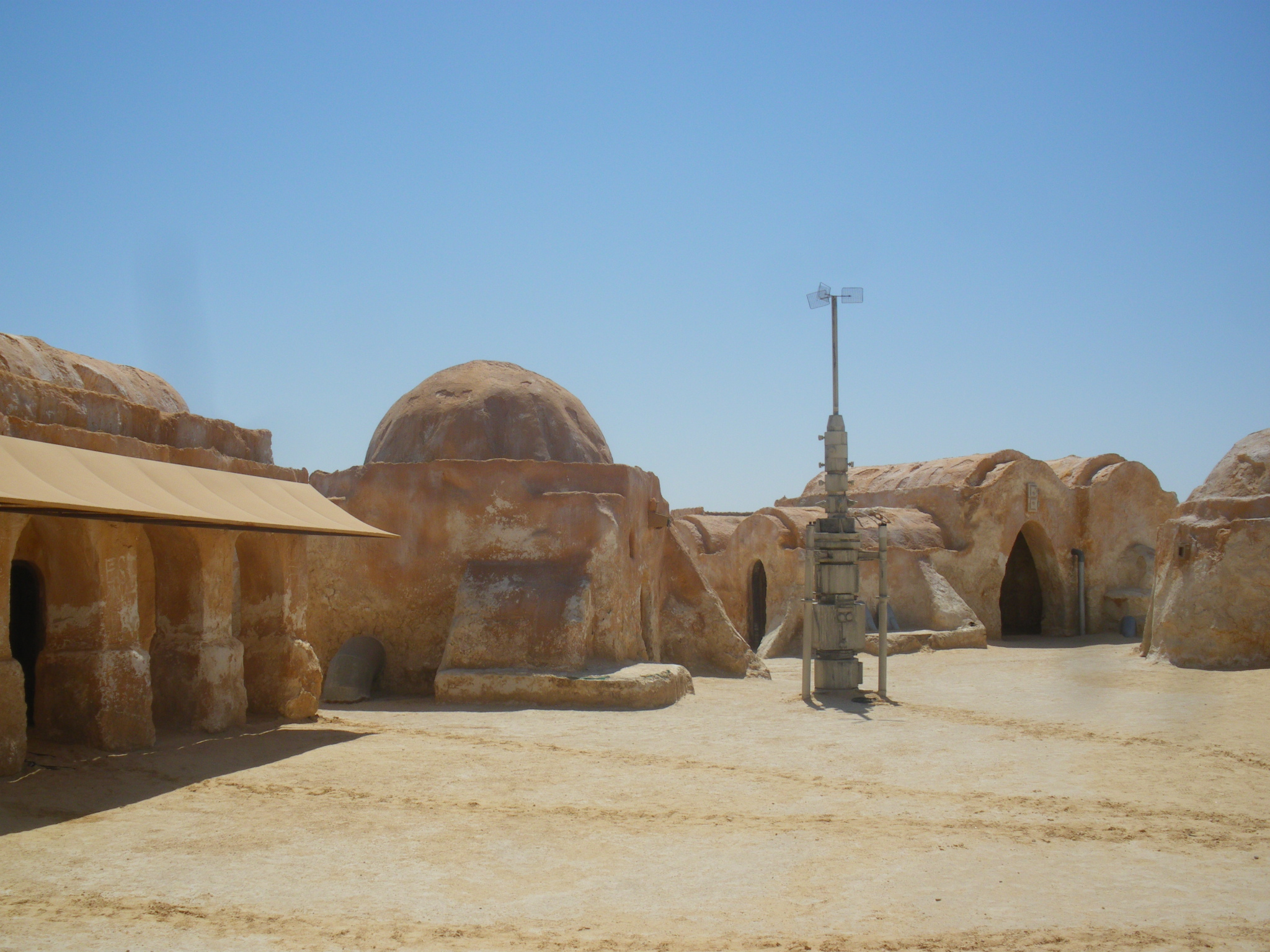
Remains of Mos Espa in the Tunisian desert, near Nafta

Filming began on June 26, 1997, and ended on September 30 of that year, primarily taking place at Leavesden Film Studios in England. Leavesden was leased for a two and a half year period so the production company could leave the sets intact and return after principal photography had been completed. The forest scenes on Naboo were filmed at Cassiobury Park in Watford, Hertfordshire. Pick-ups were shot between August 1998 and February 1999 after Lucas screened a rough cut of the film for friends and colleagues in May 1998. Most of the action and stunts were filmed by Roger Christian's second unit, which worked alongside the main unit instead of afterwards because of the high number of shots to be completed daily.

The Tunisian desert was again used for the Tatooine scenes; Mos Espa was built outside the city of Tozeur. On the night following the third day of shooting in Tozeur, an unexpected sandstorm destroyed many of the sets and props. The production was quickly rescheduled to allow for repairs and was able to leave Tunisia on the date originally planned. The Royal Palace of Caserta in Italy was used as the interior of the Theed City Naboo Palace; it was used as a location for four days after it had been closed to visitors. Scenes with explosions were filmed on replica sets in Leavesden.

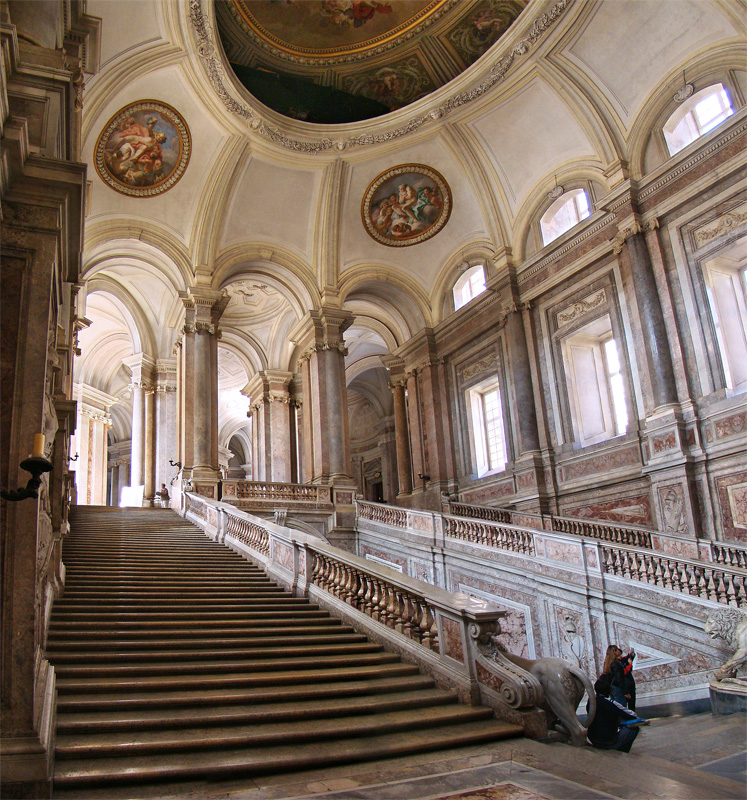
The Royal Palace of Caserta, the filming location for the Naboo Royal Palace

A binder with the film's storyboards served as a reference for live-action filming, shots that would be filmed in front of a chroma key blue screen, and shots that would be composed using CGI. The sets were often built with the parts that would be required on screen; often they were built only up to the heights of the actors. Chroma key was extensively used for digital set extensions, backgrounds, or scenes that required cinematographer David Tattersall to seek powerful lamps to light the sets and visual effects supervisor John Knoll to develop software that would remove the blue reflection from shiny floors. Knoll, who remained on set through most of the production, worked closely with Tattersall to ensure that the shots were suitable to add effects later. The cameras were fitted with data capture models to provide technical data for the CGI artists.

The Phantom Menace was the final Star Wars film to be shot mainly on 35mm film until The Force Awakens (2015). Some scenes, mostly of elements filmed by the special effects team, were shot on high definition digital video tapes to test the performance of digital recordings, which Lucas and McCallum considered the next logical step because of the amount of digitizing—an expensive process compared to recording directly on digital media—for the compositing of computer-generated effects. A couple of digitally shot scenes made it into the movie, one of them being of Qui-Gon taking a blood sample of Anakin Skywalker. Later prequel trilogy films Attack of the Clones (2002) and Revenge of the Sith (2005) would be shot using Sony CineAlta high-definition video cameras. Greg Proops and Scott Capurro were filmed wearing makeup and blue bodysuits so their heads could be joined in a computer-generated body. The visual effects crew did not like the original results and crafted Fode and Beed as an entirely computer generated alien.

Because of the amount of visual effects produced, editing took two years; Paul Martin Smith started the process in England and focused on dialogue-heavy scenes. Ben Burtt—who was also the film's sound editor—was responsible for action sequences under Lucas's supervision. Non-linear editing systems played a large part in translating Lucas's vision; he constantly tweaked, revised and reworked shots and scenes. The final sound mix was added in March 1999, and the following month, the film was completed after the delivery of the remaining visual effects shots.

=== Effects ===
"Writing the script was much more enjoyable this time around because I wasn't constrained by anything. You can't write one of these movies without knowing how you're going to accomplish it. With CG at my disposal, I knew I could do whatever I wanted."

— —George Lucas

The film saw a breakthrough in computer generated effects. About 1,950 of the shots in The Phantom Menace have visual effects. The scene in which toxic gas is released on the Jedi is the only sequence with no digital alteration. The work was so extensive that three visual effects supervisors divided the workload among themselves—John Knoll supervised the on-set production and the podrace and space battle sequences, Dennis Muren supervised the underwater sequence and the ground battle, and Scott Squires, alongside teams assigned for miniature effects and character animation, worked on the lightsaber effects.

Until the film's production, many special effects in the film industry were achieved using miniature models, matte paintings and on-set visual effects—although other films had made extensive use of CGI. Knoll previewed 3,500 storyboards for the film; Lucas accompanied him to explain factors of the shots that would be practical and those that would be created through visual effects. Knoll later said that on hearing the explanations of the storyboards, he did not know how to accomplish what he had seen. The result was a mixture of original techniques and the newest digital techniques to make it difficult for the viewer to guess which technique was being used. Knoll and his visual effects team wrote new computer software, including cloth simulators to allow a realistic depiction of the digital characters' clothing, to create certain shots. Another goal was to create computer-generated characters that could act seamlessly with live-action actors. While filming scenes with CGI characters, Lucas would block the characters using their corresponding voice actors on-set. The voice actors were then removed and the live-action actors would perform the same scene alone. A CGI character would later be added into the shot to complete the conversation. Lucas also used CGI to correct the physical presence of actors in certain scenes. Practical models were used when their visuals helped with miniature sceneries for backgrounds, set extensions and model vehicles that would be scanned to create the digital models or filmed to represent spaceships and podraces.

Lucas, who had previously confronted problems with the props used to depict R2-D2, allowed ILM and the production's British special effects department to create their own versions of the robot. Nine R2-D2 models were created; one was for actor Kenny Baker to be dropped into, seven were built by ILM and featured two wheelchair motors capable of moving 440 pounds (200 kg), enabling it to run and be mostly used in stage sets, and the British studio produced a pneumatic R2-D2 that could shift from two to three legs and was mostly used in Tunisia because its motor drive system allowed it to drive over sand.

Lucas originally planned to create many of the aliens with computer graphics, but those that would be more cost-effectively realized with masks and animatronics were created by Nick Dudman's creature effects team. These included the Neimoidians, background characters in Mos Espa, the Jedi Council, and the Galactic Senate. Dudman's team was told where the creatures would be required six months before principal photography begun, and they rushed the production. The Neimoidian suits, which were originally intended as digital characters, were delivered one day before they would be required on set. Dudman traveled to Skywalker Ranch to see the original creatures that could be reused, and read the script for a breakdown of scenes with practical creatures, leaving only the more outlandish designs to be created using CGI.

To research for the podrace vehicles, the visual effects crew visited a jet aircraft junkyard outside Phoenix, Arizona and scavenged four Boeing 747 engines. Life-sized replicas of the engines were built and sent to Tunisia to provide reference in the film. Except for Jake Lloyd inside a hydraulically controlled cockpit and a few practical podracer models, the entire podracing scene—which the effects crew designed to be as "out of this world" as possible—is computer-generated. Lucas told the effects crew to take references from Formula 1 crashes, where the high kinetic energy leads the vehicles to spin and break into pieces upon impact, leading to the creation of dedicated plugins to shatter the pod engines.

== Themes and analysis ==
=== References: Cinematic and literary allusions ===
Like previous Star Wars films, The Phantom Menace makes several references to historical events and films that George Lucas watched in his youth. The Star Wars films typically mix several concepts from different mythologies together, drawing heavily from the hero's journey, an archetypical template developed by comparative mythologist Joseph Campbell. The film also notably borrows from Ben-Hur (1959), including the podrace sequence, which mirrors the chariot race scene, the rivalry between Anakin and Sebulba, which mirrors that of Ben-Hur and his former friend turned enemy Messala and the end celebration scene closely resembles a Roman parade in Ben-Hur.

The face of Darth Maul drew upon depictions of the devil.

There are many references to Christianity in the film, such as the appearance of Darth Maul, whose design draws heavily from traditional depictions of the devil, complete with red skin and horns. The Star Wars film cycle features a similar Christian narrative involving Anakin Skywalker; he is the "Chosen One"—the individual prophesied to bring balance to the Force—who was conceived of a virgin birth. However, unlike Jesus, Anakin will eventually fall from grace and seemingly fail to fulfill his destiny (until the prophecy comes true in Return of the Jedi).

Japanese films such as Akira Kurosawa's The Hidden Fortress (1958) influenced the original Star Wars film; scholars say that The Phantom Menace was likewise influenced by Korean and Japanese culture. Film historians Geoff King and Tanya Krzywinska write, "The costume and make-up designs ... favour a mixture of the gothic and the oriental over anything very futuristic. The gothic is most strongly apparent in Darth Maul's demonic horns and the red and black make-up mask that borrows from the facial designs found in depictions of Japanese demons." King and Krzywinska say that "Qui-Gon's pony tail and Obi-Wan's position of apprentice further encourage a reading in terms of the Samurai tradition." They also say "Amidala, in keeping with her status and character, has a number of highly formal outfits ... to go with hair sculpted into a curve that frames make-up of a Japanese cast."

The Jedi practice Zen-like meditation and martial arts, as did the ancient Japanese Samurai warriors. The name "Qui-Gon" adapts the term qigong, which refers to a Chinese discipline involving meditation and cultivation of the flow of the vital energy called "qi" for healing, health, and combat. The words qi (Chinese), gi (Korean), ki (Japanese), and the Indian term "Prana" all refer to the energy that is thought to flow through all living things, from the source of all qi (or power), which is "The Way" or "The Tao" in Chinese philosophy. In Taoist philosophy, from The Way, yin and yang—the opposing but complementary aspects of reality or nature—are born. Unlike Chinese philosophy, in which yin and yang are not moral qualities, the ancient Persian philosophy of Zurvanism taught that the dualism of dark and light forces are locked in an eternal battle while being two sides (or evolutes) of the same "Force", the force of time itself (Zurvan)—the prime mover. These elements derive primarily from Eastern and Iranian religions and myths.

As with other Star Wars films, themes about family and hope are featured prominently. In the Disney Gallery: The Mandalorian episode "Legacy", Dave Filoni explains that the use of "Duel of the Fates" during the lightsaber duel between Darth Maul against Qui-Gon and Obi-Wan represents the fight for the fate of Anakin Skywalker. According to Filoni, Qui-Gon acts like a father figure towards Anakin because he feels he needs one after taking him from his mother, having realized that the Jedi should not be opposed to love and care. In the end, Qui-Gon dies, and thus Anakin loses his father figure; Obi-Wan ultimately becomes his master to honor Qui-Gon's dying wish despite his initial contempt for him, and while he comes to eventually see him like a brother as shown in Attack of the Clones and Revenge of the Sith, he does not act like a father, which coupled with the Jedi's indifference, seals Anakin's fate.

=== Dramatic irony ===
The film contains dramatic irony which the following sequels would also connect with and gain from the original trilogy. Due to the original trilogy being released first, some of the audience had already seen what followed and knew some things the characters did not know; Palpatine's true nature as the main antagonist of the saga and Ben Kenobi mentioning the Clone Wars, the Great Jedi Purge, the fall of the Republic, the rise of the Empire and a bit about Anakin's backstory to Luke Skywalker. Although C-3PO's role is smaller in the film, the audience knows he would see R2-D2 again and that they would later play significant roles alongside Anakin's children in forthcoming galactic events. Other significant dramatic ironies include Darth Vader's breathing and The Imperial March being featured in the end credits; this reminds the audience that despite Anakin's portrayal as an innocent boy and Qui-Gon's belief he is The Chosen One, the following sequels would inevitably explore his transformation into the Sith Lord. (Note: This is echoed by the 1998 poster showing Anakin Skywalker casting Darth Vader's shadow behind him.)

While the Battle of Naboo is seemingly a victory for the protagonists, what they do not know that the audience knows is that it is actually a step forward in Darth Sidious' plans for galactic domination. Although Obi-Wan has defeated Darth Maul, the true antagonist has not been revealed nor held to account for his actions. Maul's death robs Sidious of his assassin but the Sith master's survival means he is free to continue his facade as the benign politician, manipulate the galaxy's forthcoming events and pull the strings for his dark purposes. (Note: During the funeral of Qui-Gon Jinn, Mace Windu wondered whether Darth Maul was the master or the apprentice. There is an emphasis on the music when the newly-elected Supreme Chancellor Palpatine (secretly the master, Darth Sidious) is in shot. The audience is aware about Palpatine's true identity however the Jedi and heroes are unaware about it. They would not know until Palpatine reveals his identity to Anakin at the end of the Clone Wars in Revenge of the Sith.) The audience also knows (which Obi-Wan and the other heroes do not) that Sidious, being a patient long-term strategist would use Anakin as a tool to help him fulfil his objectives as well as playing a role in Anakin's turn to the dark side. After Qui-Gon's death, Anakin would seek out another father figure, Palpatine but would not know his true identity and nature until it is too late. The film significantly establishes Anakin's Achilles heel; fear of losing people he cares for. Sidious would later manipulate that fear in Revenge of the Sith. While Anakin is freed from slavery by a Jedi in the film, he becomes a slave of the Sith at the end of the prequel trilogy. While Anakin takes his first fateful steps away from his mother to become a Jedi in The Phantom Menace, he takes his final steps on a metaphorical bridge his new father figure creates in Revenge of the Sith to become the Sith Lord the audience already knows.

=== Parallels ===
The film shares several parallels with the original and sequel trilogies. While reflecting on the parallels between Anakin and Luke during The Beginning: The Making of Episode I, George Lucas said, "It's like poetry, sort of: they rhyme." Darth Sidious/Emperor Palpatine's first appearance in the prequel and original trilogies is via a hologram. His different roles as the phantom menace and Emperor are referenced in the opening crawl of The Rise of Skywalker. (Note: "Meanwhile, Supreme Leader KYLO REN rages in search of the phantom Emperor.") Qui-Gon's relationship with Anakin mirrors Ben Kenobi's relationship with Luke. Both The Phantom Menace and A New Hope mark the beginning of a young Skywalker's journey to become a Jedi on the same planet, Tatooine. Although Anakin and Luke start off with the same ambition the former is hesitant about leaving his mother behind and does not want things to change. While the latter loses his aunt and uncle he is prepared to accept the changes he faces before moving forward on his path. So Luke inadvertently accepts his grandmother's lesson to Anakin about change bringing inevitable loss. At the end of Return of the Jedi, the redeemed Anakin finally accepts his late mother's lesson to him as a boy when he requests his helmet to be removed - knowing that his death can not be prevented. Obi-Wan's reaction to his master's death mirrors Luke's reaction to Ben Kenobi's death; both Obi-Wan and Luke witness their master/mentor fighting a Sith Apprentice of Sidious. Anakin, Luke and Rey lose their mentor in the first film of their respective trilogy and this impacts their journeys as they try to find their place in the galaxy.

Anakin's destruction of the Droid Control Ship in the first film of the prequel trilogy echoes Luke's destruction of the Death Star in the first film of original trilogy. R2-D2 participates with a young Skywalker piloting a starfighter during the space battles in both The Phantom Menace and A New Hope. Both films end with a victory celebration however Sidious remains undefeated and the protagonists still have a series of forthcoming challenges to face; both Anakin and Luke struggle with the dark side but the latter displays resilience and is ultimately defined by the choices he makes (including his compassion for his father). Professor of Philosophy, John C. McDowell insists that the parallels are not limited to Anakin and Luke. He establishes parallels between Padme and Leia; both display courage and wisdom beyond their years and fight for justice. Both the Gungans and Ewoks help the heroes and courageously fight and triumph over a superior technological force. There is a bit of a resemblance between Maul's starship, Scimitar and Vader's TIE Advanced starfighter; their manufacturer is Sienar Fleet Systems (formerly known as Republic Sienar Systems during the Republic era and events of The Phantom Menace).

== Music ==
As with previous Star Wars films, Star Wars Episode I: The Phantom Menace's score was composed and conducted by John Williams. He started composing the score in October 1998 and began recording the music with the London Voices and London Symphony Orchestra at Abbey Road Studios on February 10, 1999. Williams decided to use electronic instruments such as synthesizers to enhance the sound and choral pieces to "capture the magical, mystical force that a regular orchestra might not have been able to provide", and create an atmosphere that was "more mysterious and mystical and less military" than those of the original trilogy. One of the most notable tracks is "Duel of the Fates", which uses the chorus to give a religious, temple-like feel to the epic lightsaber duel. The track was made into a music video. While composing Anakin's theme, Williams tried to reflect the innocence of his childhood and to foreshadow his transformation into Darth Vader by using slight suggestions of "The Imperial March" in the melody.

The film's soundtrack was released by Sony Classical Records on May 4, 1999. The album made its broadcast premiere on C101.5 FM Mohawk College Radio's soundtrack program, Cinematic Sound, hosted by Erik Woods on May 1, 1999. This album featured the score, which Williams restructured as a listening experience; it is not presented in film order and omits many notable cues from the film because of the space restriction of the compact disc. A two-disc "Ultimate Edition" was released on November 14, 2000. The set features the entire score as it is heard in the film, including all of the edits and loops that were made for the sound mix.

== Marketing ==
=== Promotion ===
Lucasfilm spent US$20 million on the film's advertising campaign and made promotional licensing deals with Hasbro, Lego, Tricon Global Restaurants and PepsiCo. Lucasfilm also helped the Star Wars fan club to organize an event called Star Wars Celebration, which was held in Denver, Colorado, between April 30 and May 2, 1999. Anthony Daniels collaborated with Dan Madsen organising the Celebration. He also organised finding guests, planned the stage sessions and attended the Celebration as a guest.

The first teaser trailer was released on selected screens accompanying Meet Joe Black on November 17, 1998, (Note: This was remastered in 4K to mark the film's 25th anniversary in 2024.) and media reported that people were paying full admission at theaters to see the trailer. Other films that played this trailer included The Waterboy, The Siege, A Bug's Life, The Rugrats Movie, and Enemy of the State. To keep fans from leaving before the movie was over, some theaters played the teaser an additional time after the film finished. The second trailer debuted on March 12, 1999, in front of Wing Commander's theatrical screenings. Again, many fans paid full theater admission to watch the new trailer. A bootlegged version of the preview was leaked to the Internet the same day. The next morning, the trailer was released on the film's official website and shortly afterwards the servers became overloaded. This trailer had over 1 million downloads within its first 24 hours of release, setting a record for the most downloaded trailer at the time. It would hold this record for a year until it was surpassed by The Lord of the Rings: The Fellowship of the Ring (2001) in April 2000. The theatrical trailer caused even more media attention because it was premiered in theaters and screened at the ShoWest Convention in Las Vegas, and was aired on Entertainment Tonight and Access Hollywood.

The teaser poster, featuring Anakin with his shadow forming Darth Vader's silhouette, was released on November 10, 1998. After Lucas opted for a drawn theatrical poster, Drew Struzan, the artist responsible for the Special Edition posters, was commissioned to illustrate, and the poster was unveiled on March 11, 1999. Lucasfilm dictated that, contractually, Struzan's illustration was the only art the foreign distributors could use, and other than the text, it could not be modified in any way. The film also reused the Godzilla (1998) slogan on teaser posters.

=== Adaptations ===
A novelization was written by Terry Brooks, who met with Lucas before writing the book and received his approval and guidance. It includes some scenes that are not in the film and foreshadows pending developments in the following two installments of the series. Additionally, a Scholastic junior novelization was written by Patricia C. Wrede. A four-issue comic book adaptation was written by Henry Gilroy and published by Dark Horse Comics. The film was again adapted as part of the all-ages Star Wars: The Prequel Trilogy – A Graphic Novel, released by Disney-Lucasfilm Press in 2017.

A video game adaptation was released by LucasArts for the PlayStation and PC. The podracing tie-in game Star Wars Episode I: Racer was released for Nintendo 64, PC and other platforms. A pinball machine was created by WMS Industries, becoming the second to utilize the Pinball 2000 hardware, after Revenge from Mars (1999). This was the company's last game to be made before their pinball division was shut down in October 1999.

== Release ==
=== Theatrical ===
The release of the first new Star Wars film in 16 years was accompanied by a considerable amount of attention. According to The Wall Street Journal, so many workers announced plans to view the premiere that many companies closed on the opening day. Queue areas formed outside cinema theaters over a month before ticket sales began. More theater lines appeared when it was announced that cinemas were not allowed to sell tickets in advance until two weeks into the release. This was because of a fear that family theater-goers would be either unable to receive tickets or would be forced to pay higher prices for them. Instead, tickets were to be sold on a first-come-first-served basis. However, after meetings with the National Association of Theatre Owners, Lucasfilm agreed to allow advance ticket sales on May 12, 1999, provided there was a limit of 12 tickets per customer. As a result, some advance tickets were sold by scalpers at prices as high as US$100 apiece, which a distribution chief called "horrible" and said was exactly what they wanted to avoid. Daily Variety reported that theater owners received strict instructions from Lucasfilm that the film could only play in the cinema's largest auditorium for the first 8–12 weeks, no honor passes were allowed for the first eight weeks, and they were obliged to send their payments to distributor 20th Century Fox within seven days.

Despite worries about the film being finished on time, two weeks before its theatrical release, Lucasfilm moved the release date from May 21 to 19, 1999. At the ShoWest Convention, Lucas said the change was intended to give the fans a "head start" by allowing them to view it during the week and allowing families to view it during weekends. Eleven charity premieres were staged across the United States on May 16, 1999; receipts from the Los Angeles event, where corporate packages were available for between US$5,000 and US$25,000; proceeds were donated to the Elizabeth Glaser Pediatric AIDS Foundation. Other charity premieres included the Dallas premiere for the Children's Medical Center, the Aubrey Fund for Pediatric Cancer Research at the Sloan-Kettering Hospital in New York, the Big Brother/Sister Association of the Philadelphia premiere, and the Children's National Medical Center in Washington, D.C. A statement said that tickets were sold at US$500 apiece and that certain sections of the theaters were set aside for disadvantaged children.

The film opened at 12:01 am on Wednesday, May 19, 1999, in 2,010 theaters in the United States and Canada. An additional 960 theaters screened the film later in the day. About 120 theaters showed the film continuously on opening day, including the Ziegfeld Theatre in New York City and the Chinese Theatre in Los Angeles. Foreshadowing his future conversion to digital cinematography, Lucas said the film would be released on four digital projectors (two in New York and two in Los Angeles) on June 18, 1999. Few film studios released films during the same week: DreamWorks and Universal Studios released The Love Letter on May 21 and Notting Hill on May 28, respectively. The Love Letter was a commercial failure but Notting Hill fared better and followed The Phantom Menace closely in second place. Employment consultant firm Challenger, Gray & Christmas estimated that 2.2 million full-time employees missed work to attend the film, resulting in a US$293 million loss of productivity.

The film had its UK premiere as the Royal Film Performance, an event held in aid of the Film & TV Charity, on July 14, 1999, at the Odeon Leicester Square. This event was attended by Prince Charles and helped to raise £225,000 for the charity.

=== Home media ===
Comparison between the puppet of Yoda, present in the original 1999 theatrical and 2001 DVD releases, and the computer-generated model, present in the 2011 Blu-ray Disc and 3D releases

The film was released on VHS on April 3, 2000, in the United Kingdom. It was released in North America a day later and in Japan and Brazil on April 8 in what was claimed as the tightest worldwide release for a home video. There were two versions of the film, which were a standard pan and scan version and a widescreen Collector's Edition version. In its first two days of availability in the United States, the regular version sold 4.5 million copies and the limited edition sold 500,000. Making $176 million in sales revenue, The Phantom Menace was the fourth-highest-selling home video release of 2000, after Tarzan, Toy Story 2, and The Sixth Sense (all 1999).

A year later on June 19, 2001, it was announced that The Phantom Menace would become the first Star Wars film to be officially released on DVD, in a slightly extended cut from the theatrical releases. This THX-certified two-disc DVD release debuted on October 16 of the same year. The first disc contains the film and the second disc contains special features. On the first disc, there are three randomized selected menus themed to the planets Naboo, Tatooine, and Coruscant. There is an Easter egg located in the options menu. When the THX Optimizer is highlighted, the viewer can press 1-1-3-8. By doing this, some bloopers and DVD credits will be shown. The special features include seven deleted scenes completed specifically for the DVD, a commentary track featuring Lucas and producer Rick McCallum, and several documentaries—including a full-length documentary entitled The Beginning: Making Episode I. There are also DVD-ROM features, including trailers for Attack of the Clones (2002).

Upon its DVD premiere on October 16, 2001, The Phantom Menace competed with other major DVD titles that were released that month, including Snow White and the Seven Dwarfs (1937) and The Godfather trilogy. It became the fastest-selling DVD title of all time in the United States with 2.2 million copies being sold in its first week after release. This surpassed the previous record briefly held by The Mummy Returns (2001) two weeks prior, which sold 2 million copies within its first week. Less than a month later, The Phantom Menace's record for being the fastest-selling DVD was taken by Shrek (2001) when it sold 2.5 million copies in its first three days. The Phantom Menace was one of the only four films to sell over 2 million DVD copies during their first weeks of release at the time, with the others being The Mummy Returns, Shrek, and How the Grinch Stole Christmas (2000). The film would overall earn $45 million from its first week DVD sales, more than the theatrical releases of From Hell, Riding in Cars with Boys, Training Day (all 2001), and other post-9/11 films.

At the 5th Annual DVD awards, The Phantom Menace won four categories: Viewers' Choice Award, Best Menu Design, Best Authoring and Best Audio Presentation, with the latter award being tied with Pearl Harbor (2001).

A fullscreen version of the DVD was released in 2002 to coincide with the home video release of Attack of the Clones. A two-pack DVD release in that format would premiere at the same time.

The DVD version was re-released in a prequel trilogy box set on November 4, 2008. A LaserDisc version of The Phantom Menace was released in Japan on April 7, 2000, a year and a half before it was available on DVD in the U.S. The Star Wars films were released by 20th Century Fox Home Entertainment on Blu-ray Disc on September 16, 2011; The Phantom Menace was restored to improve the picture quality and remove the magnification present on the previous DVD release, restoring approximately 8% of the picture to the frame. In the Blu-ray release of The Phantom Menace, the Yoda puppet was replaced with a CGI model, making it consistent with the other films of the prequel trilogy.

On April 7, 2015, Walt Disney Studios, 20th Century Fox and Lucasfilm jointly announced the digital releases of the six released Star Wars films. The Phantom Menace was released through the iTunes Store, Amazon Video, Vudu, Google Play and Disney Movies Anywhere on April 10, 2015.

Walt Disney Studios Home Entertainment reissued The Phantom Menace on Blu-ray, DVD and digital download on September 22, 2019. Additionally, all six films were made available for 4K resolution HDR and Dolby Atmos streaming on Disney+ upon the service's launch on November 12, 2019. This version of the film was released by Disney on 4K Ultra HD Blu-ray box set on March 31, 2020.

=== Theatrical re-releases ===
On September 28, 2010, it was announced that all six films in the series would be adapted to 3D. These would be re-released in episode order, beginning with The Phantom Menace, which was released to cinemas on February 10, 2012. Prime Focus Limited did the conversion under the supervision of ILM. However, the 3D re-releases of Episodes II–VI were postponed or canceled after Lucasfilm was bought by The Walt Disney Company, who decided to focus on the development of Star Wars: The Force Awakens (2015).

Lucas stated the 3D re-release was "just a conversion" of the film's 2011 Blu-ray release and no additional changes were made. Only a change to Anakin's magnetic wand during the podrace scene—its tip was sharpened to more accurately fit the original 2D photography to the new 3D image—was confirmed.

General Mills and Brisk were promotional partners in North America for the 3D re-release but promotion was limited. The film was extensively promoted in Japan; promotional products were sold by 7-Eleven, Domino's Pizza, Pepsi and Gari-Gari Kun. Kellogg's promoted the film internationally, and French restaurant Quick launched three Star Wars-themed burgers. Lucasfilm also partnered with Variety, the Children's Charity to raise funds for children through the sale of a special edition badge.

On February 10, 2024, it was announced that The Phantom Menace would be re-released by 20th Century Studios on May 3, 2024, for the film's 25th anniversary. The film's re-release announcement was accompanied by a new poster by artist Matt Ferguson. A preview for the TV series The Acolyte was shown after these screenings. (Note: This television series is set at the end of the High Republic era and a 100 years before the Skywalker saga. The Phantom Menace is set in 32 BBY therefore The Acolyte is set in 132 BBY.)

== Reception ==
=== Critical response ===
Following an advance screening on Saturday, May 8, 1999, several newspapers broke an agreement with Fox and published reviews of the film on Sunday, May 9. In a front-page review, the Los Angeles Daily News gave it 3½ stars calling it "pretty good" overall and "outstanding in many parts." The New York Daily News was less positive, giving it 2½ stars. Variety also made its review by Todd McCarthy available on the Sunday with McCarthy calling it "the most widely anticipated and heavily hyped film of modern times" but said that the film "can scarcely help being a letdown on some levels, but it's too bad that it disappoints on so many" and that "it is neither captivating nor transporting, for it lacks any emotional pull, as well as the sense of wonder and awe that marks the best works of sci-fi/fantasy."

On review aggregator Rotten Tomatoes, the film has an approval rating of 54% based on 290 reviews, with an average rating of 6.2/10. The site's critical consensus reads, "Burdened by exposition and populated with stock characters, The Phantom Menace gets the Star Wars prequels off to a bumpy—albeit visually dazzling—start." As of February 2025, the film is the second lowest-rated live-action film of the Star Wars series just ahead of The Rise of Skywalker (2019). On Metacritic, the film has a weighted average score of 51 out of 100, based on 36 critics, indicating "mixed or average reviews." Audiences polled by CinemaScore gave the film an average grade of "A−" on an A+ to F scale.

Many aspects of the script and characters were criticized, especially that of Jar Jar Binks, who was regarded by many members of the older fan community as toyetic—a merchandising opportunity rather than a serious character. Ahmed Best had later said that he contemplated suicide after receiving backlash for his portrayal. Kenneth Turan of the Los Angeles Times described Binks as "a major miscue, a comic-relief character who's frankly not funny." Drew Grant of Salon wrote, "Perhaps the absolute creative freedom director George Lucas enjoyed while dreaming up the flick's 'comic' relief—with no studio execs and not many an independently minded actor involved—is a path to the dark side."

Conversely, Roger Ebert of the Chicago Sun-Times gave it three-and-a-half stars out of four and called it "an astonishing achievement in imaginative filmmaking" and said, "Lucas tells a good story." Ebert also wrote that, "If some of the characters are less than compelling, perhaps that's inevitable" because it is the opening film in the new trilogy. He concluded his review by saying that rather than Star Trek films, filmmakers could "[g]ive me transparent underwater cities and vast hollow senatorial spheres any day." Owen Gleiberman of Entertainment Weekly gave the film a "B" grade and complimented Liam Neeson's performance and the action scenes. In an Entertainment Weekly review for the DVD release, Marc Bernardin gave the film a "C−", calling it "haplessly plotted, horribly written, and juvenile." ReelViews' James Berardinelli wrote, "Looking at the big picture, in spite of all its flaws, The Phantom Menace is still among the best 'bang for a buck' fun that can be had in a movie theater," and said the film was a "distinct improvement" over Return of the Jedi. In 2024, Brian Lowry of CNN praised the film for its "duel of fates" between Darth Maul, Qui-Gon Jinn and Obi-Wan, the Emperor's long game of how the Sith were to outmaneuver the Jedi, and the digital effects.

Andrew Johnston of Time Out New York wrote, "Let's face it: no film could ever match the expectations some have for Episode I – The Phantom Menace. Which isn't to say it's a disappointment: on the contrary, it's awesomely entertaining, provided you accept it on its own terms ... Like the original film, it's a Boy's Own adventure yarn with a corny but irresistible spiritual subtext. The effects and production design are stunning, but they always serve the story, not the other way around." Susan Wloszczyna of USA Today said that the film does "plenty right" and praised the characters Darth Maul and Watto. David Cornelius of efilmcritic.com said that the film's better moments "don't merely balance out the weaker ones—they topple them." Colin Kennedy of Empire magazine said that despite problems with pacing and writing, "there is still much pleasure to be had watching our full-blown Jedi guides in action." He praised the visuals and Liam Neeson's performance and said that the duel between Darth Maul and the Jedi is "the saga's very best lightsaber battle."

Empire magazine ranked The Phantom Menace on its list of "500 Greatest Movies of All Time", while Entertainment Weekly and Comcast included the film on their lists of the worst movie sequels. James Berardinelli wrote, "The Phantom Menace was probably the most overhyped motion picture of the last decade (if not longer), and its reputation suffered as a result of its inability to satisfy unreasonable expectations." William Arnold of the Seattle Post-Intelligencer agreed that the film's massive hype caused many of the negative reactions, saying, "it built expectations that can't possibly be matched and scuttled [the] element of storytelling surprise." He also said that the film was "well made and entertaining" and was much better than similar box office fare released around that year, such as The Mummy and The Matrix. Ewan McGregor said in 2002 that he was "slightly disappointed" that the film was "kind of flat" and believed the next film in the franchise would have "much more humor and...color."

The introduction of midi-chlorians—microscopic organisms that mediate use of the Force—has been regarded as controversial. Some viewed it as a concept that negates the Force's spiritual quality. Film historian Daniel Dinello says, "Anathema to Star Wars fanatics who thought they reduced the Force to a kind of viral infection, midi-chlorians provide a biological interface, the link between physical bodies and spiritual energy." Religion expert John D. Caputo writes, "In the 'Gospel according to Lucas', a world is conjured up in which the intractable oppositions that have tormented religious thinkers for centuries are reconciled ... The gifts that the Jedi masters enjoy have a perfectly plausible scientific basis, even if its ways are mysterious: their bodily cells have a heavier than usual concentration of 'midi-chlorians'."

There has been some controversy over whether several alien characters reflect racial stereotypes. For example, the oafish, slow-witted Jar Jar Binks has long droopy ears reminiscent of dreadlocks and spoke with what many perceived as a Caribbean patois reminiscent of Jamaican Creole. Andrew Howe rejects most such connections, arguing that only Jar Jar's accent links him to the Caribbean and no other factor. However, Nicholas Wanberg argues that linguistic analysis of Jar Jar's accent shows no common features with Caribbean English save those it also shares with American English, although he concedes that Jar Jar is constructed with tropes typical of ethnically stereotyped characters. Similarly, Drew Grant describes the character as "[s]ervile and cowardly ... a black minstrel-ish stereotype on par with Stepin Fetchit." Georgetown University professor of African-American studies Michael Eric Dyson says that the entire Gungan species seems suggestive of a primitive African tribe, with Boss Nass portrayed as "a fat, bumbling ... caricature of a stereotypical African tribal chieftain." The greedy and corrupt Neimoidians of the Trade Federation have been noted as resembling East Asian stereotypes, and the unprincipled trader Watto has been interpreted as a Jewish stereotype reminiscent of Charles Dickens' character Fagin. Lucas has denied all of these implications, instead criticizing the American media for using opinions from the Internet as a reliable source for news stories. Lucas added that it reflects more the racism of the commenters than it does the movie; however, animator Rob Coleman said ahead of the film's release that Watto's mannerisms were inspired by footage of Alec Guinness as Fagin in Oliver Twist.

=== Box office ===
Box office revenue			Box office ranking		Reference
United States and Canada	Other territories	Worldwide	All time U.S. and Canada	All time worldwide	Reference
$487,576,624	$558,938,785	$1,046,515,409	No. 23	No. 49	

Even though it received mixed reviews, The Phantom Menace was a financial success, breaking many box office records in its debut, and beating out The Mummy by taking number 1. The film broke The Lost World: Jurassic Park's records for the largest single-day gross for taking more than $28 million in the opening day and fastest to gross $100 million in five days. Additionally, it grossed $64.8 million in its opening weekend, the second highest ever at the time, behind The Lost World: Jurassic Park. The film's opening day record would be held until Harry Potter and the Sorcerer's Stone beat it in 2001. It also became the quickest film to reach the $200 million and $300 million marks, surpassing Independence Day (1996) and Titanic (1997), respectively. The Phantom Menace held both records before Spider-Man took them in 2002. It would go on to earn $105.7 million, making it the highest five-day Wednesday opening weekend of all time. The film had the biggest opening weekend for any 20th Century Fox film for two years until 2001 when it was taken by Planet of the Apes. Then in 2003, The Lord of the Rings: The Return of the King surpassed The Phantom Menace for having the largest Wednesday gross, as well as the highest five-day Wednesday opening weekend. During its second weekend, The Phantom Menace made $51.3 million, making it the highest-grossing second weekend at the time, surpassing Jurassic Park (1993). The film would hold this record until it was surpassed a year later by How the Grinch Stole Christmas. In total, the film stayed at the top of the box office for three weeks until it was overtaken by Austin Powers: The Spy Who Shagged Me during its fourth weekend. The Phantom Menace was 1999's most successful film, staying in the Top 10 until August 5 (11 weeks total), earning $431.1 million in the United States and Canada. Box Office Mojo estimates that the film sold over 84.8 million tickets in the US in its initial theatrical run.

The film set an opening record in Japan, grossing $12.2 million in its first two days from 403 screens. In the UK, the film also set an opening record with £9.5 million in its opening weekend (including previews), surpassing Men in Black (1997). It would go on to hold this record for seven months until it was taken by Toy Story 2 in February 2000. The Phantom Menace also grossed a record $11 million in its opening weekend in Germany. Outside the United States and Canada, the film grossed over $10 million in Australia ($25.9 million), Brazil ($10.4 million), France and Algeria ($43 million), Germany ($53.9 million), Italy ($12.9 million), Japan ($109.9 million), Mexico ($12 million), Spain ($25 million), and the United Kingdom and Ireland ($81.9 million). Its overseas total was $493.2 million, taking its worldwide total to $924.3 million. At that time, the film was the third-highest-grossing film in North America behind Titanic and Star Wars (1977), and the second-highest-grossing film worldwide behind Titanic without adjusting for inflation of ticket prices.

After its 3D re-release in 2012, the worldwide box office gross exceeded $1 billion, making it the first Star Wars film and the 11th film in history—excluding inflation—to do so. Although in the intervening years, the film had lost some of its rankings in the lists of highest-grossing films, the 3D re-release returned it to the worldwide all-time Top 10 for several months. In North America, its revenues overtook those of the original Star Wars as the saga's highest-grossing film when not adjusting for inflation of ticket prices, and is the tenth-highest-grossing film in North America as of August 2017. In North America, its ranking on the Adjusted for Ticket Price Inflation list climbed to 16th place—one place behind Return of the Jedi. The 3D re-release, which premiered in February 2012, earned $43 million—$22.5 million of which was in North America—worldwide. The 3D re-release earned US$102,727,119 worldwide—including $43.5 million in North America—and has increased the film's overall box office takings to $474.5 million domestically, and $552.5 million in other territories. The 25th anniversary re-release debuted in second place at the U.S. and Canadian box office behind The Fall Guy with $8.8 million and grossed an additional $6.4 million internationally, bringing its weekend total to $14.5 million worldwide.

=== Accolades ===
The Phantom Menace received three nominations at the 72nd Academy Awards: Best Sound Effects Editing, Best Visual Effects and Best Sound (Gary Rydstrom, Tom Johnson, Shawn Murphy and John Midgley); all three awards went to The Matrix. The film won Saturn Awards for Best Costumes and Best Special Effects, the MTV Movie Award for Best Action Scene, and a Young Artist Award for Jake Lloyd's performance. It was also nominated for—among others—the BAFTAs for Visual Effects and Sound, and the Grammy Award for Best Score Soundtrack for Visual Media. However, the film did receive seven Golden Raspberry Award (Razzie) nominations for Worst Picture, Worst Director, Worst Screenplay, Worst Supporting Actor (Jake Lloyd as Anakin), Worst Supporting Actress (Sofia Coppola as Saché), Worst Screen Couple (Jake Lloyd and Natalie Portman), and Jar Jar Binks actor Ahmed Best won the Worst Supporting Actor category.

== Legacy ==
A month after the film's release, "Weird Al" Yankovic released the parody song and music video "The Saga Begins", in which he interprets the film's plot from Obi-Wan's point of view to the tune of Don McLean's "American Pie"; this was included as a bonus feature on a 2011 Star Wars Blu-ray. June 1999 also had South Park parodying Jar Jar Binks in the episode "Jakovasaurs", which had the townspeople of South Park getting annoyed at extraterrestrials who spoke and behaved similarly to Jar Jar to reflect the hatred writers Matt Stone and Trey Parker had for the character.

The film is known for starting the Lego Star Wars toyline, which has become one of Lego's most successful licensed brands. Darth Maul's lightsaber-fighting style served as the inspiration for the 2003 viral video Star Wars Kid. Maul, who appears to die in The Phantom Menace, was resurrected for the animated series Star Wars: The Clone Wars, and he also appears in Star Wars Rebels, Solo: A Star Wars Story (2018) (Note: This marked his first live-action appearance since The Phantom Menace.) and Star Wars: Maul - Shadow Lord. (Note: This television series takes place after the events of Star Wars: The Clone Wars.) In 2012, IGN named Maul the 16th-greatest Star Wars character. A similar weapon to his dual-bladed lightsaber appears in Star Wars: The Rise of Skywalker (2019).

Qui-Gon Jinn did not physically appear in Attack of the Clones however archival recordings of Liam Neeson appear as a disembodied ghostly voice heard by Anakin through the Force as he was slaughtering the Tusken Raiders. Despite his death during the Battle of Naboo, he returned as a Force ghost in Star Wars: Clone Wars, (Note: Following Disney's acquisition of Lucasfilm, this was discarded from the franchise's canon.) Star Wars: The Clone Wars and Obi-Wan Kenobi (2022). Some footage of The Phantom Menace can be seen in a recap of the prequel trilogy at the beginning of Obi-Wan Kenobi Part I. Qui-Gon also appeared as a Jedi Padawan as well as Jedi Master in Star Wars: Tales of the Jedi. Liam Neeson, Ewan McGregor and Samuel L. Jackson made vocal cameos as Qui-Gon Jinn, Obi-Wan Kenobi and Mace Windu respectively in The Rise of Skywalker.

Following the reappraisal of the prequel trilogy, Ahmed Best has continued his association with his character and the franchise. He voiced a Sith Lord version of Jar Jar in Lego Star Wars: Rebuild the Galaxy (2024-2025). Best previously voiced Jar Jar in Star Wars: The Clone Wars. On 11 October 2025, it was announced that he and Marc Guggenheim would co-write a Marvel Comics issue, Jar Jar Binks #1 featuring Jar Jar and another character Best portrayed - Jedi Master Kelleran Beq. (Note: The character appeared in the gameshow, Star Wars: Jedi Temple Challenge and The Mandalorian season 3, Chapter 20: The Foundling.) Following his portrayal of Jedi Master Kelleran Beq in The Mandalorian season 3, Best discussed the possibility of playing Jar Jar again saying, “I would never say never. I don’t feel like Jar Jar’s story was ever closed.”

=== Sequels ===
A sequel, Attack of the Clones, was released in 2002. The story continues a decade later with Anakin grown to adulthood, played by Hayden Christensen. A second sequel, Revenge of the Sith, was released in 2005 and culminates with Anakin's transformation into Darth Vader.

=== Cast and crew response ===
“I was impressed the prequels had their own identity.”

— —Mark Hamill in 2021

Since the release of The Phantom Menace, many people who have worked on the Star Wars films and viewers have defended the prequel trilogy. Ewan McGregor said that he found it difficult dealing with the criticism saying, "For it to come out and get knocked so hard was personally quite difficult to deal with." He also said that his opinion of the prequels improved as he met fans who grew up with them and "realized how important our films have been to them", stating that critics "just wanted to feel like they were seven or eight again, and they didn't get that," and defending how George Lucas attempted to do something different rather than just "make another three Star Wars films that felt like the original ones." Such a point of view was reflected by Richard Newby of The Hollywood Reporter, on the 20th anniversary of The Phantom Menace, who acknowledged that "the film didn't live up to the lofty expectations that many fans of the original trilogy held for 16 years", but that the fan backlash never changed his own appreciation of the film, that he first saw as a child and even as Newby started to notice the film's flaws as he grew up, "they expanded the Star Wars universe in a way that kept me interested."

Hayden Christensen, who plays Anakin Skywalker in Attack of the Clones and Revenge of the Sith, reflected that by going back to the character as a child in The Phantom Menace, "George Lucas subverted our expectations and understanding of this character" and made it a good starting point for Anakin's character development throughout the trilogy. In a 2018 Saturday Night Live comedy rap video, Natalie Portman dresses up as Queen Amidala and threatens an interviewer who tries to mock the prequels. Anthony Daniels, who has portrayed C-3PO in the Skywalker saga, one anthology film, one animated film, radio series and numerous television shows, said in his memoirs that following a reappraisal of the prequel trilogy that "the years have been kinder to this, the first Prequel. Many, who were young at the time, still hold it, and Jar Jar Binks as their dearest memory of the Saga." He also said that Darth Maul remains one of his favourite characters in the saga - despite his limited appearance in the film. In a 1999 interview for Star Wars Insider, he said that he "enjoyed [the film] immensely." In a 2019 article, Daniels defended Ahmed Best praising him for his humour, intelligence and energy and saying that the criticism he faced "was beyond cruel."

Many members of the prequel production team have defended the character of Jar Jar Binks and its portrayer Ahmed Best. In an interview with Andy Cohen, Liam Neeson said that he was proud of his involvement with the film, and expressed how he was distressed at the backlash at Best, "one of the funniest and most talented guys [he's] ever worked with." Visual effects supervisor John Knoll reflected that "George took a lot of the criticism pretty harshly", down to reducing Jar Jar's role in the following two movies, and that he was happy to see Best received with a standing ovation at the 2019 Star Wars Celebration Chicago. Animation director Rob Coleman said that twenty years later he still has younger people coming up to him and telling him that Jar Jar is their favorite character, and digital model designer Jean Bolte, who cited Jar Jar Binks as one of her favorite characters to work with alongside Sebulba and Yoda, added that "seeing and hearing the fans so interested in which one was our contribution…. It really completely changed my point of view about being privileged to have had anything to do with these films."

During the Celebration, George Lucas named Jar Jar as his favourite character and praised Best saying, "Ahmed, you did a fantastic job. It was very, very hard." Best himself said he was moved by the newfound appreciation and support he received during The Phantom Menace 20th anniversary panel (at Star Wars Celebration) - given the previous backlash, adding that it was possible because for the ones who saw the movie as children, "the prequels, that's theirs, and they defend the prequels. So I see the same thing. I see the resurgence of The Phantom Menace." He cited the audience (the film was aimed for) reaching adulthood and their perspective as some of the reasons for the newfound appreciation for The Phantom Menace.

== See also ==
- List of underwater science fiction works

== Works cited ==
- Bouzereau, Laurent (1997). The Annotated Screenplays. Del Rey. ISBN 0-345-40981-7.
- Bortolin, Matthew (2005). The Dharma of Star Wars. Wisdom Publications, ISBN 978-1614292869
- Bouzereau, Laurent; Duncan, Jody (1999). The Making of Star Wars: The Phantom Menace. Ballantine. ISBN 0-345-43111-1.
- Bowen, Jonathan L. (2005). Anticipation: The Real Life Story of Star Wars: Episode I-The Phantom Menace. iUniverse. ISBN 0-595-34732-0. Archived from the original on January 31, 2021.
- Brooker, Will (2017). Star Wars (ebook ed.). Bloomsbury Publishing. ISBN 9781844575541.
- Chernoff, Scott (1998). Snyder, John Bradley (ed.). "Something Wicked This Way Comes". Star Wars Insider 37. Fantastic Media.
- Chernoff, Scott (1999). Snyder, Jon Bradley (ed.). "Anthony Daniels: Nuts and Bolts". Star Wars Insider 46. The Fan Club, Inc.
- Daniels, Anthony (2019). I Am C-3PO: The Inside Story (Hardback ed.). London: DK. ISBN 9780241357606.
- Dowsett, Elizabeth; Beecroft, Simon; Fry, Jason; Hugo, Simon (2024). LEGO Star Wars Visual Dictionary Updated Edition (Hardback ed.). London: DK. ISBN 9780241651339.
- Grimes, Caleb; Winship, George (2006). "Episode I: The Phantom Menace". Star Wars Jesus: A spiritual commentary on the reality of the Force. WinePress Publishing. ISBN 1579218849.
- Hanson, Michael; Kay, Max S. (2000). Star Wars: The New Myth. ISBN 9781401039899.
- Kaminski, Michael (2007). "The Secret History of Star Wars". Archived from the original on July 6, 2007.
- —— (2008) [2007]. The Secret History of Star Wars. Legacy Books Press. ISBN 978-0-9784652-3-0.
- Magazines, Titan (2021b). Star Wars: Episode V: The Empire Strikes Back The 40th Anniversary Special Edition (Hardback ed.). London: Titan Magazines. ISBN 9781787734234.
- Magazines, Titan (2021). Star Wars: The Skywalker Saga: The Official Collector's Edition (Hardback ed.). London: Titan Magazines. ISBN 9781787734661.
- Magazines, Titan (2024). Star Wars: The Phantom Menace: The 25th Anniversary Special Edition (Hardback ed.). London: Titan Magazines. ISBN 9781787745162.
- Magazines, Titan (2025). Star Wars: Revenge of the Sith The 20th Anniversary Special (Hardback ed.). London: Titan Magazines. ISBN 9781787746725.
- McDonald, Paul F. (2013). The Star Wars Heresies: Interpreting The Themes, Symbols and Philosophies of Episodes I-III. McFarland, ISBN 978-0786471812
- McDowell, John C. (2016). Identity Politics in George Lucas' Star Wars (ebook). McFarland. ISBN 9781476624501.
- Rinzler, J.W. (2007). The Making of Star Wars: The Definitive Story Behind the Original Film (Star Wars). Del Rey. ISBN 978-0-345-49476-4.
- Wainerdi, Brandon (2025). Star Wars Encyclopedia of Starfighters and other Vehicles (Hardback) (1st ed.). London: Dorling Kindersley. ISBN 9780241722701.
- Wilkins, Jonathan, ed. (2019). Star Wars: Aliens, Creatures and Droids (Paperback) (1st ed.). Titan. ISBN 9781785851964. Archived from the original on April 27, 2026.
- Windham, Ryder; Wallace, Daniel; Hidalgo, Pablo (2011). Star Wars Year by Year: A Visual Chronicle (Hardback ed.). London: DK. ISBN 9781405392303.
