= Star Wars Episode I (pinball) =

1999 pinball machine

- Manufacturer: Williams
- Release date: June 1999
- System: Williams Pinball 2000
- Design: John Popadiuk
- Programming: Cameron Silver, Duncan Brown
- Artwork: Dave Mueller, Paul Barker, Kevin O'Connor
- Mechanics: Jack Skalon, Bob Brown
- Music: Eric Pryzby
- Sound: Eric Pryzby
- Website: Star Wars Episode I
- Production run: 3,525 units (confirmed)

Star Wars Episode I is a 1999 pinball game designed by John Popadiuk and released by Williams and the second (and last) machine to use the Pinball 2000 hardware platform. It is based on the first installment of the Star Wars prequel trilogy, The Phantom Menace.

Released in June 1999, Star Wars Episode I was the last game manufactured by WMS industries (Williams and Bally labels) before the company announced the closure of their pinball division on October 25 of the same year, with production ceasing on November 19. The jet bumper rule of the 1.4 software reminds players of that date: The number of points for spelling Jar Jar is 19,992,510; This is the date 25-10-1999, the same day WMS announced the closing of their pinball branch.

The game was also available as a conversion kit for Revenge From Mars which included a Star Wars Episode I playfield, game ROMs, manual, cabinet decals, translite and a manual plunger.

== Design ==
In early development the concept began as Defenders, a remake of Defender, but transitioned to Star Wars when the license became available.

As part of the secrecy imposed by the agreement with Lucas Licensing, during development it was named "The Kahuna Project".

The game used three programmers, and six graphic designers.

The game was designed to be more open like 1970s games such as Captain Fantastic, and had fewer main shots to make it more accessible to younger players.

Due to having a similar build and long hair John Popaduik played the part of Qui-Gon Jinn using motion capture. Kevin O'Connor similarly played the part of Darth Maul.

== Gameplay ==
The goal of the game is to become a Jedi Spirit. To reach the Spirit level one must battle through Youth, Knight, and Master levels, fighting Darth Maul in a light saber battle at each level. To get to the duel one must spell "J-E-D-I" by completing the various modes started at the Holoprojector or being randomly awarded a letter through various other means. The included modes are:

- Ground Battle - Hit center field 4 times to destroy MTT and end mini-game.
- Sub Escape - Hit center or ramps enough times to end mini-game
- Hangar Escape - Destroy all Droids (by hitting them or using lasers) and then hit center to end mini-game
- Jar Jar Juggling - Trip Jar Jar (by hitting center) and then collect 3 items to end mini-game.
- Podracing - Hit 3 checkered flags to end mini-game.
- Space Battle - Similar to Hangar Escape, Destroy all fighters (by hitting them or using lasers) and then hit center to end mini game
- Sith Droids - Hit the moving target 3 times to end mini-game
- R2-D2 Astrodroid - Hit center field enough times to end mini-game
- Queen’s Game - Hit all 6 cards to end mini-game. Hit the cards using the ramps, and hit center to spin the wheel. Firing a laser also spins the wheel.
- Jedi Musical Chairs - Hit 3 characters when their name is displayed to end mini-game. The character in center will always be called, and hitting left and right ramps will move them
- Watto’s Chance - Hit center field or ramps enough times to advance dialogue and end mini-game
- Destroyer Droids - Hit the moving target enough times to end mini-game
- Gungan Battle - Hit the moving target enough times to end mini-game

Other ways to get Jedi Letters include:

- Completing C-3PO twice (the first time lights Extra Ball)
- Getting a Skill Shot 3 times
- Randomly getting one from right saucer (Mos Espa Market)
- Selecting a character with Jedi Letter in Jedi Musical Chairs

=== Multiball ===
Multiball is started by putting a ball into each of the saucers (Mos Espa Market and Watto’s Junk Shop). If more than one player is playing it is possible to “steal” the other players multi-ball prep work. It's also possible to shoot the active ball into a saucered ball so both come flying back. Useful in a multiplayer game, less so in a single player (and counter-productive if it happens during a Jedi Battle).

When multiball is started, the center target lights up for a 1,000,000 jackpot. If 2 (or 3 if the ball saver is still running) balls drain without making the first jackpot the player will be offered the opportunity to restart the multiball by shooting either saucer. Note that the restarted multiball is only two balls but allows the player to hit the skill shot again.

The pattern for jackpots:

- Center target only – 1,000,000 points
- Left and Right ramps – 1,000,000 points each
- Center target, Left and Right ramps – 1,000,000 points each with a Super Jackpot awarded for the last of the three 5,000,000 points.

After one has lost two of the three balls in play, the multiball ends and the saucers go dark. To relight the saucers one needs to hit either saucer once for each multiball that has been started. So to lock the ball in the Junk Shop for the second multiball, one first needs to hit either the Junk Shop or the Market once first.
