= Pinball 2000 =

Pinball hardware and software platform

- Product type: Pinball
- Current owner: Williams Electronic Games
- Introduced: 1999
- Website: Pinball 2000

Pinball 2000 was the last pinball hardware and software platform developed by major pinball manufacturer Williams, and was used in the machines Revenge from Mars (under the brand name Bally) and Star Wars Episode I (under the brand name Williams) before Williams exited the pinball business on October 25, 1999. It is the successor to the Williams Pinball Controller platform.

Unlike previous pinball machines, Pinball 2000 machines feature a computer monitor to display animations, scores, and other information. The player perceives this video to be integrated with the playfield, due to a mirrored playfield glass (utilizing an illusion called "Pepper's ghost") that reflects the monitor hung in the head of the machine. This allows the display of virtual game targets in the playfield's upper third that can be "hit" by the machine's physical steel ball. "Impacts" on these targets are detected by physical targets in the middle of the playfield, and by recognizing successful shots up the left and right ramps and orbits/loops.

Revenge from Mars, the first of the two released games, sold a promising 6,878 units. However, Star Wars Episode I suffered from a rushed and top-secret production cycle and sold only about half as many units (3,525), contributing to Williams' decision to close down its historic pinball division.

== Development ==
The Pinball 2000 platform was originally designed to use a backbox video display (replacing the standard dot matrix display) but without the mirroring technique, reminiscent of those seen in Bally's Baby Pac-Man (1982) and Granny and the Gators (1983) or Gottlieb's Caveman (1982) pinball machines.

The first-generation mockup prototype of the Pinball 2000 architecture was called Holopin—it used main designer George Gomez's old Amiga computer to drive the video display, and a No Good Gofers whitewood prototype playfield. The integration of pinball and video was inspired by the Asteroids Deluxe arcade machine, which used a one-way mirror to add a static background graphic to the game's animated vector graphics.

Tom Uban was the system architect.

== Technical details ==
- Computer: The machine's head contains an IBM PC compatible computer consisting mainly of a BAT style PC mainboard running a Cyrix MediaGX model GXm-233GP CPU connected to a Cyrix CX5520 bridge. A PCI-PRISM card holds the game ROMs and DCS2 sound hardware. The "Pinball 2000 hardware" setup was an ATX motherboard running a MediaGX CPU (x86 clone, it lives on as AMD Geode). It also had a custom PCI card for storage and sound DSP, and a secondary board connected by parallel port for driving lamps and solenoids.
- Video: Pinball 2000 uses a 19-inch CGA color monitor either a Wells-Gardener 19K7302 or a Ducksan CGM-1901CW model. It is possible to exchange the built-in monitor with an LCD, provided it can handle the low refresh rate (15 Hz) and resolution (640x240) of an arcade CGA monitor.
- Graphics SDK: Allegro Software Development Kit
- Audio: DCS2 audio hardware provides full stereo output, compared to the old WPC system's mono. The Pinball 2000 cabinet was the first to be equipped with a real subwoofer, where prior machines used a less-expensive broadband speaker.
- OS and Sub System: XINA is an application layer on top of XINU that handles the executive tasks of running a pinball machine, and also abstracts the various hardware features. The name XINA was inspired by XINU meaning: "XINA Is Not APPLE" (APPLE was the previous pinball programming system of previous WPC pinballs, no connection to the computer company.)
- Software management: Software can be updated via a serial cable connected to a second PC, so no ROM exchanges are necessary as in previous generations.
- Network support: Pinball 2000 machines can be networked, enabling them to be set up for game tournaments where each machine displays all high scores and even optional player pictures. It is also possible to play a machine from another computer—for example, over the Internet—using the Telnet protocol and a webcam.
- Maintenance innovations: Broken hardware such as lamps, fuses, switches and coils are listed in the service menu on the display and indicated on a playfield or circuit board diagram.
- Quick game swapping: Playfields and software can be quickly swapped, theoretically enabling operators to convert an existing game into a new one in just 5 to 10 minutes; or to exchange a faulty playfield with a replacement.

A conversion kit for Revenge from Mars was released so it could be converted into a Star Wars Episode I. The kit included a new playfield, ROMs, cabinet decals and a manual plunger.

== Games ==
Released

- Revenge From Mars (1999)
- Star Wars Episode I (1999)

Planned (unreleased)

- Wizard Blocks – A prototype exists, owned by Gene Cunningham.
- Playboy – A prototype exists, owned by Gene Cunningham.
- Monopoly – Planned but canceled. Stern later released their own Monopoly pinball.
- Wild Toys – Registered as a trademark to Williams Electronic Games but later abandoned in favor of Wizard Blocks.
- Holopin - Prototype Machine. Made to show Pinball 2000 concepts.
