= Revenge from Mars =

1999 pinball machine

- Manufacturer: Williams Electronics Games
- Release date: January 1999
- System: Pinball 2000
- Design: George Gomez
- Artwork: John Youssi, Greg Freres
- Mechanics: Chris Shipman
- Music: Dan Forden
- Sound: Dan Forden
- Dots/Animation: Adam Rhine, Scott Slomiany, Jack Liddon, Scott Sanders, Dave Mueller
- Website: Revenge From Mars
- Production run: 6,878 (confirmed)

Revenge from Mars is a pinball machine designed by George Gomez and manufactured by Williams Electronics Games (under the Bally label) in 1999. It is the sequel to the similarly themed Attack from Mars.

== Design ==
This game was the first to use the Williams Pinball 2000 system that overlays interactive video onto the mechanical playfield (see also Star Wars Episode I).

Software updates were available from the manufacturer's website.

An additional first was the default absence of a replay/special. Instead of awarding the player a free game when reaching a certain number of points, it was decided to rather award extra balls (default at 50 million and 200 million). This default behaviour can be changed by the operator though. Additionally the match sequence at the end of a pinball game (a random free play award) can be disabled. This was originally disabled in 1994's Road Show pinball machine by default, too, but was since enabled by default again.

=== Artwork ===
The large Martian on the backbox is shown crushing an Edsel. Greg Freres incorporated this after hearing CEO of Williams, Neil Nicastro, telling a distributor "this could revolutionize pinball, or it could be the next Edsel".

== Gameplay ==
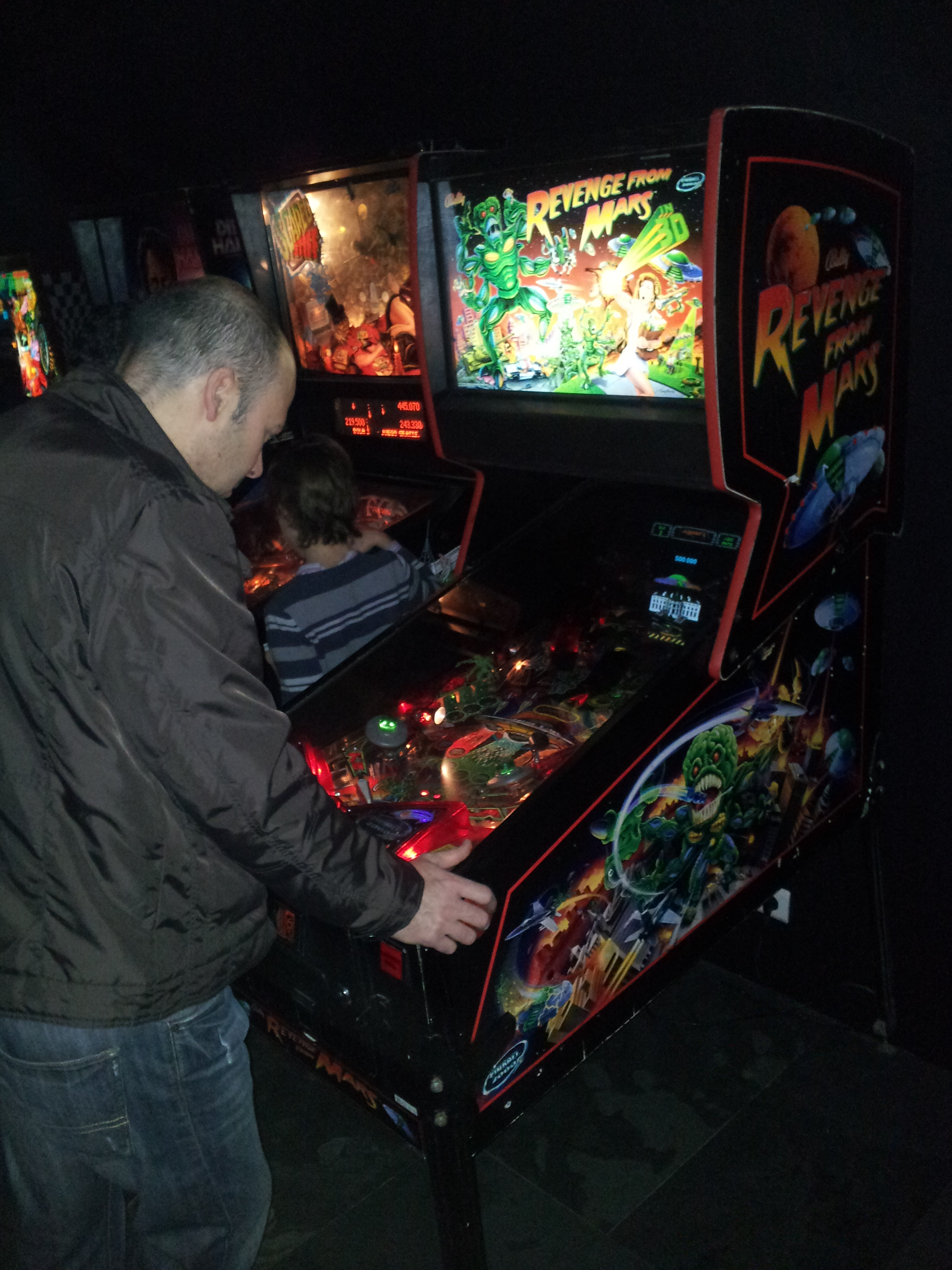
Man playing Revenge from Mars.

There are 9 different main modes which can each be completed to obtain a Saucer light. These 9 modes are divided into 3 different groups and are listed below. The initial mode begins upon its selection at the start of the game (either manually with the action buttons or automatically after the choice times out). The modes move from left to right in sequence automatically after the previous mode has been completed (i.e. there is no "start mode" shot), with the exception of the middle group (Saucer) which begins after one of the other two mode groups has been completed. Each individual mode continues until it has been completed, even between balls. When a mode has been completed, the video will display a report. If the mode is completed properly according to the directions on the video display, the player will receive a "Flawless" rating. This rating must be achieved in order to obtain one Saucer light. Thus completing all of these modes with a Flawless rating will light all 9 Saucer lights. This, along with the other 2 requirements (Martian Multiball and Mothership Multiball), will light Attack Mars. Saucer lights can also be obtained in other ways (Martian Multiball, Stroke of Luck, Bonus Wave Multiball, Super Jackpot), so getting Flawless on all (or even any) of these modes is not a requirement.

=== Fuel ===
- Alien Abduction — The scene is in front of the White House. A large saucer is hovering overhead, with smaller saucers appearing to the sides. Various objects (sportscars, cows, etc.) appear at the sides as well, and the smaller UFOs attempt to use their tractor beams to steal these objects (these objects can be cycled through by using the Action buttons). The scoring is based on saving the item being beamed up and goes up to 3 million. Regardless of where an item's value starts, it counts down fairly rapidly (i.e. a hurry-up) once the Martians start abducting it. Shooting the Martian to save the item immediately awards the current item's value, and adds the item value to the mode "jackpot" (which starts at 1M). Once all items have been rescued and the center ramp lights, the mode jackpot will start counting down as a hurry-up until you shoot the ramp to collect. Hitting the center targets, ramps and loops will destroy the smaller UFOs, as will the missiles. After seven of the smaller saucers are destroyed, one final hit up the middle Mini ramp will destroy the large saucer, ending the mode. Destroying all seven saucers will award a Flawless rating and a Saucer light. The whole mode features various audio samples made by a Bill Clinton impersonator.
- Martian Happy Hour — In this mode, there are five Martians sitting at the bar in various states of inebriation, cracking bad human jokes, consuming various flammable substances and engaging in dangerous pastimes. Overhead are suspended three "kegs" of kerosene, gasoline and propane, which can be set off by the Missiles with devastating effects. The Martians on each of the ramps can be destroyed by one hit apiece, the ones on the Capture Lane and Martian target (left of the Center Target bank) take two hits apiece, and the one in the middle takes three hits (these hit numbers can be adjusted by the difficulty setting). Each Martian destroyed awards 1.5M points. Each orbit will set off one of the kegs on the sides for 4M apiece. To destroy the center keg, one must shoot the right ramp (after taking care of the Martian that's blocking the way) and the center ramp will briefly pop up. If you successfully make this shot, it is worth 6M points. (Note: destroying all three kegs will immediately blow up the bar, ending the mode and possibly denying you of a Flawless rating unless you've already killed all the Martians). When the three center Martians are destroyed, the center ramp will pop up to end the mode, awarding 2M for any remaining kegs at the top of the screen. Destroying all five Martians will award a Flawless rating and Saucer Light.
- Secret Weapon — This mode is depicted as hand-to-hand combat between A.B.E (a giant robotic version of Abraham Lincoln called the Advanced Battle Emancipator) and one of the Big-O-Martians. a "life bar" is shown at the top for the Martian, and various shots will cut down this life bar. Finally, when the life bar is down all the way, in a callback to the Mortal Kombat games, "Finish him!" appears on the screen, and one last shot will send the Martian flying upwards and hitting the saucer, causing it to explode dramatically.

=== Saucer ===
- Tower Struggle — The Leaning Tower of Pisa is being used for a game of Tug-of-War by four Martians. Shoot the left and right ramps to destroy the saucers with one hit apiece, and the two Martians that are located on the lock shot and the top Martian light. As in several other modes, there is a "life bar" which is decreased by shooting the tower (Center Target Bank), and enough hits will eventually raise the ramp to end the mode. Destroying the two Martians and saucers will immediately raise the center Mini ramp to end the mode with one more shot. All four must be destroyed for a Flawless rating.
- Mystery Mode (?) — This mode will randomly select one of the following four modes:
  - Martian Aerobics — This mode is a tribute to Space Invaders. By shooting any shot, some missiles will launch at the 24 moving Martians on the screen. Sometimes while playing this mode, a huge saucer floats down into the middle of the image. One can shoot it, but it is unclear yet whether or not one can destroy it without completing the mode the usual way. Destroy all 24 before they get to the bottom of the screen to finish the mode and receive a saucer light.
  - Martian Bowling — 10 Martians are moving across the screen. The action buttons are used to aim while the real pinball will resemble a bowling ball that can hit the Martian shaped pins.
  - Martian Autopsy — At the start of the mode, a hurry-up runs on the center shot, starting at 3M. Whatever value one collects is locked in as the value for each object during the rest of the mode. 10 objects must be collected for a Flawless rating (and Saucer Light).
  - Martian Tank — This mode is the toughest to complete. Basically there is a moving tank target with two Martians sitting aboard on both sides. The object is to destroy both Martians by shooting the ramps at the right moment. Destroying both Martians and the tank afterwards, a Flawless rating is received.
- Drive-In Demolition — The last saucer mode pays homage to the "Move Your Car" mode from Creature from the Black Lagoon, but this time, it's the Martians blocking the screen. As with Secret Weapon, all shots will inflict damage (there is a power bar that tells how much damage is still left to do). In order to get a saucer light one must complete the meter all the way down.

=== Weapons ===
- Paris in Peril — This mode begins with a flying saucer located over the Eiffel Tower. There is a catapult in the center which is used to fire various objects (watermelons, spiked balls, cows, etc.) at the saucer. Hitting the center targets will fire the catapult, with each hit doing 13% damage (this is operator adjustable and can be up to 25% or 4 hits to destroy). The missile lanes on the outside will do 25% damage to the saucer. After the saucer is hit once, 4 Martians will parachute in (some may not be initially visible as they float off of the screen) on the left and right ramps, the Capture lane and the Martian target to the left of the Center Target Bank. Each Martian can be destroyed by one hit from the ball, and are worth 1M, 1.5M, 2M, and 5M. All 4 must be destroyed for a Flawless rating. You can complete this mode with or without destroying the Martians by hitting the middle X times (the side shots do 2x the middle damage). After 8 hits of damage (again, operator adjustable), the center Mini Ramp will pop up, and one more shot will destroy the saucer, ending the mode and earning points.
- Big-O-Beam — This mode is set on a farm, where the livestock seem to have taken on rather large proportions. There is a saucer hovering over the barn, and large barnyard animals to the side. Hitting the center targets will cause the barn to leap up and damage the saucer, and now, with 2M points per hit. The ramps and orbits will, in addition to awarding missiles, shrink the currently enlarged animals for 4M apiece. There are 4 animals (a cow, a duck, a pig and a chicken) which need to be "saved" for a Flawless rating. There is "Life bar" above the saucer that shows how much damage is left--once this is depleted the center mini ramp will raise and light. Shrinking all 4 animals will also cause the center ramp to raise and light to finish the mode, so you don't have to deplete the life bar. Overall, this mode is a good one to start out the game on, as this one is a higher-point mode than several others.
- Mars Kneads Women — There are six television screens you can tune in on. You can change the currently playing show on these by using the Action Buttons. The object here is to tune into a screen and watch the show. You can always cancel a show by pressing all 4 buttons while it is playing. The left TV screens can be viewed by either hitting the loop or the left ramp/middle ramp combo. Same goes for the right side. If you shoot either the left or right ramp, the center ramp will pop up for a shot to watch a show. Shooting the orbits is a better way to go, as this will start the show immediately and save you a shot (the rollover lanes will register here, but the jets are disabled, and the ball isn't returned to play until the show is over or cancelled). The center targets will light the 2 center TV screens (which, again, can be watched via the center ramp shot). Finally, after the two center TV screens have been watched, one more center ramp shot will destroy the console for a point value between 2-5M based on how many TVs were watched during the mode. Note, the screen will say "Destroy the Console" to let you know that the ramp shot will end the mode, so if you are not finished viewing all of the screens, shoot the remaining shot(s), watch the shows, then destroy the console to get Flawless. You must view all six TV stations to obtain a Flawless rating.

== Multiball modes ==
display during "Martian Attack Multiball"

There are six multiball modes in Revenge from Mars:

- Martian Attack Multiball (2-ball)
- Multiball (3-ball)
- Bonus Wave Multiball (Fuel, Saucer & Weapons, 4-ball)
- Mothership Multiball (4-ball)
- Martian Hypno-Beam (extendable 2-ball)
- Attack Mars (Wizard Mode, 4-ball)

These rules were extended and tweaked almost 20 years after the initial release by unofficial updates (see https://www.mypinballs.com/software/rfm/code_updates.jsp), also introducing formerly unused sounds and graphics found in the ROMs.

== Software upgrades ==
Revenge from Mars allows for software updates to enhance gameplay or fix software problems. To update the game software, it is necessary to connect a serial cable from the Revenge From Mars to a personal computer using the Pinball 2000 software updater program. Software updates can be obtained from http://www.planetarypinball.com/.

== Hardware upgrades ==
An unofficial "Upgrade" / Mod was released to allow the CRT in Pinball 2000 machines to be replaced with an LCD monitor. This allowed owners a cheaper alternative for machine repair - and lightened the overall machine weight.

== Reception ==
It was reported in 2008 that one particular Revenge from Mars had made US $41,900 on location.
