= Pong =

1972 video game

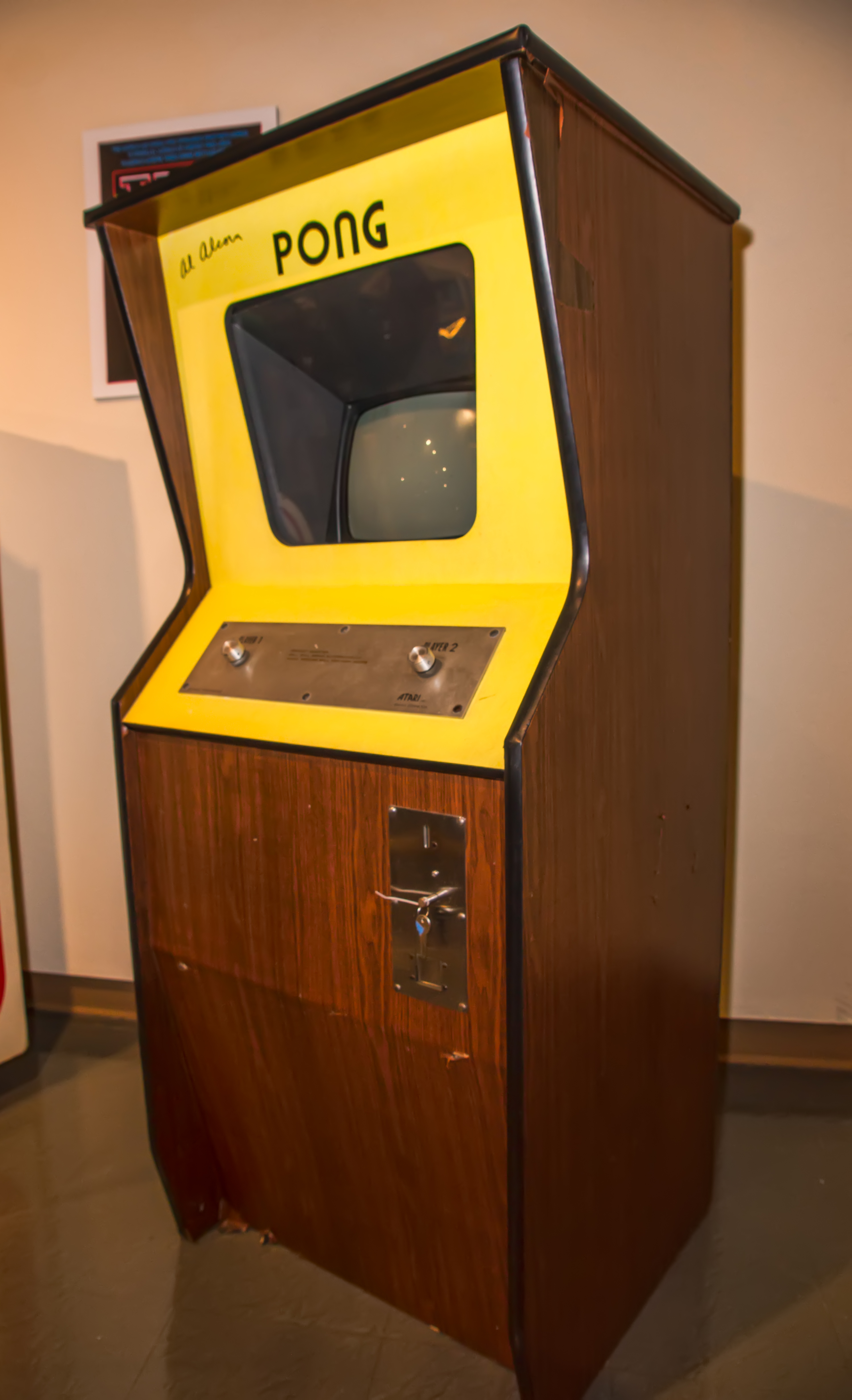
- An upright cabinet of Pong on display at the Neville Public Museum of Brown County
- Developer: Atari, Inc.
- Publishers: Atari, Inc.
- Designer: Allan Alcorn
- Platforms: Arcade, dedicated console
- Release: Arcade: NA: November 29, 1972; JP: November 1973; EU: 1973; Home version October 1975
- Genre: Sports
- Modes: Single-player, multiplayer

Pong is a 1972 sports video game developed and published by Atari, Inc. for arcades. It was created by Allan Alcorn as a training exercise assigned to him by Atari co-founder Nolan Bushnell. Bushnell and Atari co-founder Ted Dabney were so surprised by the quality of Alcorn's work that they decided to manufacture the game. Bushnell based the game's concept on an electronic ping-pong game included on the Magnavox Odyssey, the first home video game console; in response, Magnavox later sued Atari for patent infringement.

Pong was the first commercially successful video game, helping to establish the video game industry along with the Magnavox Odyssey. Soon after its release, several companies began producing games that closely mimicked its gameplay. Eventually, Atari's competitors released new types of video games that deviated from Pong's original format to varying degrees; this, in turn, led Atari to encourage its staff to move beyond Pong and produce more innovative games themselves.

Atari released several sequels to Pong that built upon the original's gameplay by introducing new features. During the 1975 Christmas season, Atari released a home version of Pong exclusively through Sears retail stores. The home version was also a commercial success and led to numerous clones. The game was later remade on numerous home and portable platforms. Pong is regarded as one of the most influential and greatest video games of all time, and is considered one of the most culturally significant video games, being part of the permanent collection of the Smithsonian Institution in Washington, D.C..

== Gameplay ==
The two paddles return the ball back and forth. The score is displayed at the top of the screen.

Pong is a two-dimensional sports game that simulates table tennis. The player controls an in-game paddle by moving it vertically across the left or right side of the screen. They can compete against another player controlling a second paddle on the opposing side. Players use the paddles to hit a ball back and forth. The goal is for each player to reach eleven points before the opponent; points are earned when one fails to return the ball to the other.

== Development and history ==
Atari engineer Allan Alcorn designed and built Pong as a training exercise.

Pong was the first game developed by Atari. In 1971, Bushnell and Dabney founded Syzygy Engineering to develop the concept of a standalone computer system with a monitor and attaching a coin slot to it to play games on. Drawing inspiration from Spacewar!, the duo created Computer Space. As the game did not fare well commercially, Bushnell decided to form a company to produce more games by licensing ideas to other companies. The first contract was with Bally Manufacturing Corporation for a pinball game and a video game that Bushnell told Bally would have a hockey theme. Soon after the founding, Bushnell hired Allan Alcorn because of his experience with electrical engineering and computer science; Bushnell and Dabney also had previously worked with him at Ampex. Prior to working at Atari, Alcorn had no experience with video games.

To acclimate Alcorn to creating games, Bushnell gave him a project secretly meant to be a warm-up exercise. Bushnell told Alcorn that he had a contract with General Electric for a product, and asked Alcorn to create a simple game with one moving spot, two paddles, and digits for score keeping. In 2011, Bushnell stated that the game was inspired by previous versions of electronic tennis he had played before; Bushnell played a version on a PDP-1 computer in 1964 while attending college. However, Alcorn has claimed it was in direct response to Bushnell's viewing of the Magnavox Odyssey's Tennis game. In May 1972, Bushnell had visited the Magnavox Profit Caravan in Burlingame, California where he played the Magnavox Odyssey demonstration, specifically the table tennis game. Though he thought the game lacked quality, seeing it prompted Bushnell to assign the project to Alcorn.

Alcorn first examined Bushnell's schematics for Computer Space, but found them to be illegible. He went on to create his own designs based on his knowledge of transistor–transistor logic (TTL) and Bushnell's game. Feeling the basic game was too boring, Alcorn added features to give the game more appeal. He divided the paddle into eight segments to change the ball's angle of return. For example, the center segments return the ball at a 90° angle in relation to the paddle, while the outer segments return the ball at smaller angles. He also made the ball accelerate the longer it remained in play; missing the ball reset the speed. Another feature was that the in-game paddles were unable to reach the top of the screen. This was caused by a simple circuit that had an inherent defect. Instead of dedicating time to fixing the defect, Alcorn decided it gave the game more difficulty and helped limit the time the game could be played; he imagined two skilled players being able to play forever otherwise.

Three months into development, Bushnell told Alcorn he wanted the game to feature realistic sound effects and a roaring crowd. Dabney wanted the game to "boo" and "hiss" when a player lost a round. Alcorn had limited space available for the necessary electronics and was unaware of how to create such sounds with digital circuits. After inspecting the sync generator, he discovered that it could generate different tones and used those for the game's sound effects. To construct the prototype, Alcorn purchased a $75 Hitachi black-and-white television set from a local store, placed it into a 4-foot (1.2 m) wooden cabinet, and soldered the wires into boards to create the necessary circuitry. The prototype impressed Bushnell and Dabney so much that they felt it could be a profitable product and decided to test its marketability.

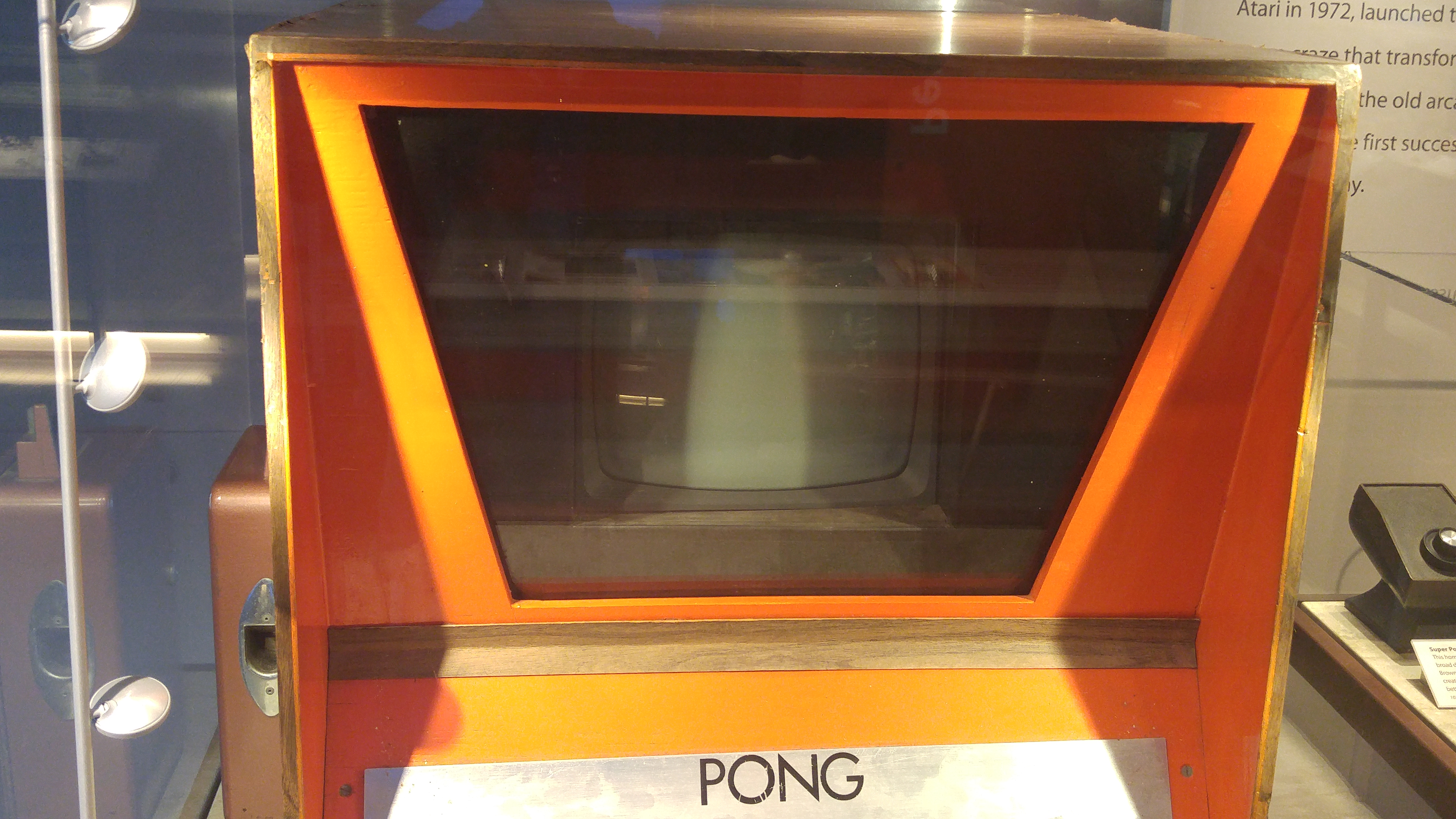
The Pong prototype that was used in the tavern

In August 1972, Bushnell and Alcorn installed the Pong prototype at a local bar, Andy Capp's Tavern. They selected the bar because of their good working relationship with the bar's owner and manager, Bill Gaddis; Atari supplied pinball machines to Gaddis. Bushnell and Alcorn placed the prototype on one of the tables near the other entertainment machines: a jukebox, pinball machines, and Computer Space. The game was well received the first night and its popularity continued to grow over the next one and a half weeks. Bushnell then went on a business trip to Chicago to demonstrate Pong to executives at Bally and Midway Manufacturing; he intended to use Pong to fulfill his contract with Bally. A few days later, the prototype began exhibiting technical issues and Gaddis contacted Alcorn to fix it. Upon inspecting the machine, Alcorn discovered that the problem was due to the coin mechanism overflowing with quarters.

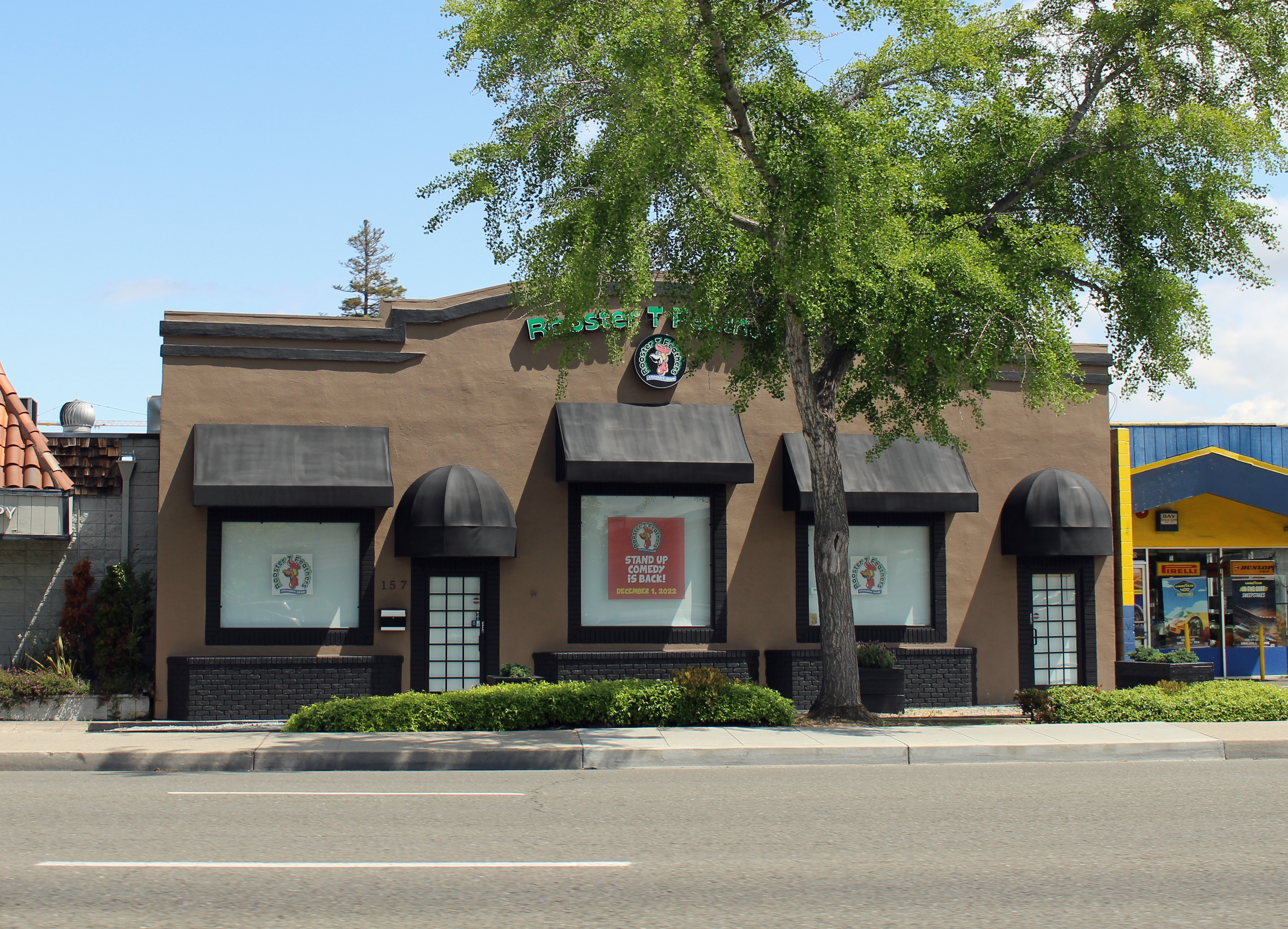
The former site of Andy Capp's Tavern in 2023, which was replaced by the Rooster T. Feathers comedy club in 1984

After hearing about the game's success, Bushnell decided there would be more profit for Atari to manufacture the game rather than license it. Bushnell had difficulty finding financial backing for Pong; banks viewed it as a variant of pinball, which at the time the general public associated with the Mafia. Atari eventually obtained a line of credit from Wells Fargo that it used to expand its facilities to house an assembly line. The company announced Pong on November 29, 1972. Management sought assembly workers at the local unemployment office, but was unable to keep up with demand. The first arcade cabinets produced were assembled very slowly, about ten machines a day, many of which failed quality testing. Atari eventually streamlined the process and began producing the game in greater quantities. By 1973, they began shipping Pong to other countries with the aid of foreign partners.

In Japan, Pong was officially released in November 1973 by Atari Japan, which would later be sold to Namco. However, Pong had been beaten to the market by two Japanese Pong clones released in July 1973: Sega's Pong Tron and Taito's Elepong.

=== Home version ===
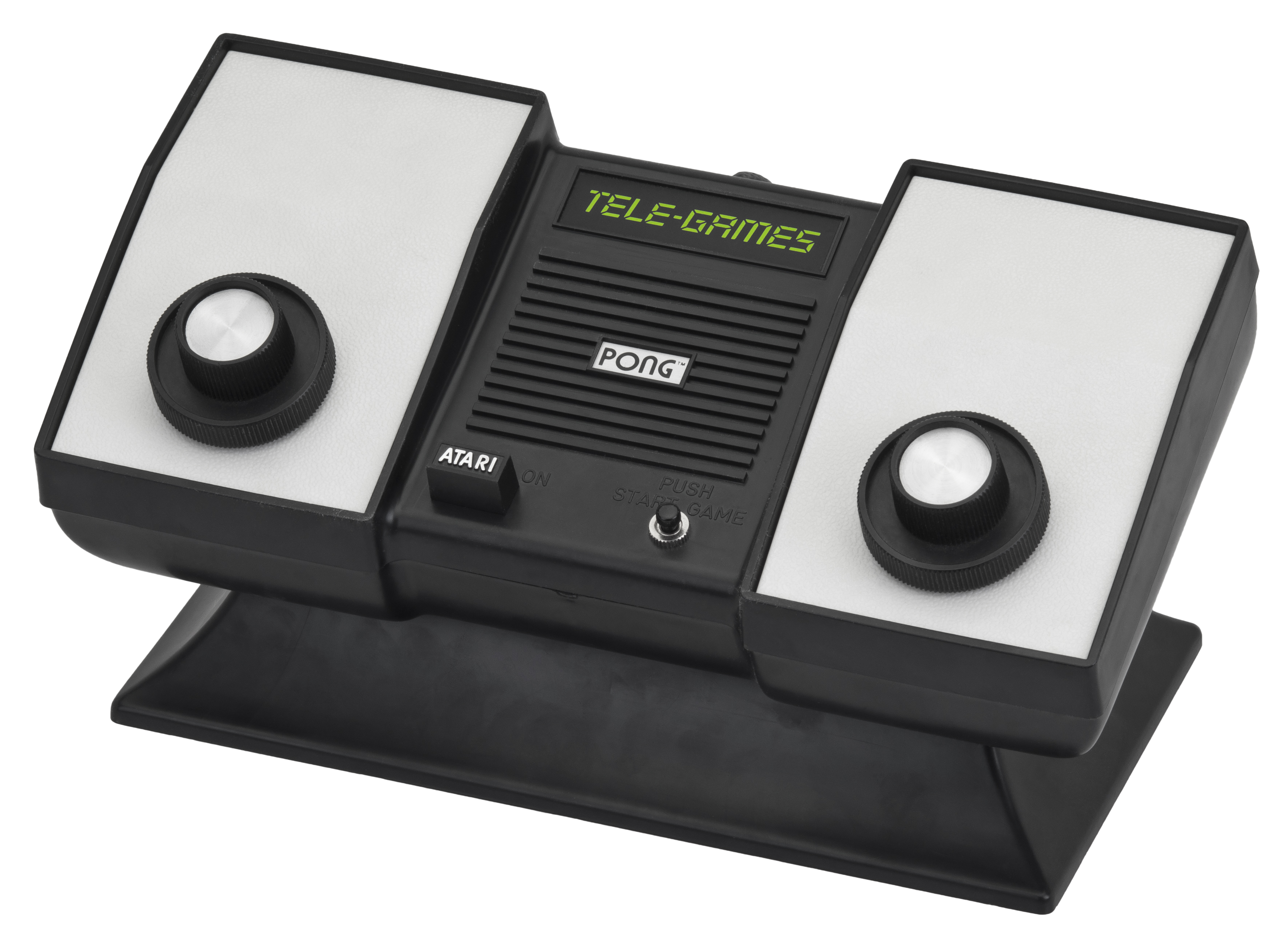
Atari's Home Pong console, released through Sears in 1975

After the success of Pong, Bushnell asked his employees to create new products. A new electronic technology, the large-scale integration (LSI) chip, had recently become available, which Bushnell believed would "allow pioneering in new" game concepts. Atari began working on the reduction of Pong from a large arcade printed circuit board (PCB) down to a small LSI chip for use in a home system. The initial development cost for a game on a single LSI chip was expensive, costing around $50,000 (equivalent to $397,000 in 2025), but once the chip was developed, it became significantly cheaper to mass-produce the game as well as more difficult to reverse-engineer.

In 1974, Atari engineer Harold Lee (1944-2021) proposed a home version of Pong that would connect to a television: Home Pong. The system began development under the codename Darlene, named after an employee at Atari. Alcorn worked with Lee to develop the designs and prototype and based them on the same digital technology used in their arcade games. The two worked in shifts to save time and money; Lee worked on the design's logic during the day, while Alcorn debugged the designs in the evenings. After the designs were approved, fellow Atari engineer Bob Brown assisted Alcorn and Lee in building a prototype. The prototype consisted of a device attached to a wooden pedestal containing over a hundred wires, which would eventually be replaced with a single chip designed by Alcorn and Lee; the chip had yet to be tested and built before the prototype was constructed. The chip was finished in the latter half of 1974, and was, at the time, the highest-performing chip used in a consumer product.

Bushnell and Gene Lipkin, Atari's vice-president of sales, approached toy and electronic retailers to sell Home Pong, but were rejected. Retailers felt the product was too expensive and would not interest consumers. Bushnell contacted Sears after coming across a Magnavox Odyssey advertisement in the sporting goods section of its catalog. Atari staff (including Bushnell and Lipkin) discussed the game with a representative, Tom Quinn, who expressed enthusiasm and offered the company an exclusive deal. Believing they could find more favorable terms elsewhere, Atari's executives declined and continued to pursue toy retailers. In January 1975, Atari staff set up a Home Pong booth at the American Toy Fair (a trade fair) in New York City, but was unsuccessful in soliciting orders due to high price of the unit.

While at the show, they met Quinn again, and, a few days later, set up a meeting with him to obtain a sales order. In order to gain approval from the Sporting Goods department, Quinn suggested Atari demonstrate the game to executives in Chicago. Alcorn and Lipkin traveled to the Sears Tower and, despite a technical complication in connection with an antenna on top of the building which broadcast on the same channel as the game, obtained approval. Bushnell told Quinn he could produce 75,000 units in time for the Christmas season; however, Quinn requested double the amount. Though Bushnell knew Atari lacked the capacity to manufacture 150,000 units, he agreed. Atari acquired a new factory through funding obtained by venture capitalist Don Valentine. Supervised by Jimm Tubb, the factory fulfilled the Sears order. The first units manufactured, branded with Sears' "Tele-Games" name, started to sell around the end of October to mid-November 1975 with a 1-year warranty for $98.95 and an additional $7.95 for the optional AC adapter. Atari later released a version under its own brand in 1976.

=== Lawsuit from Magnavox ===
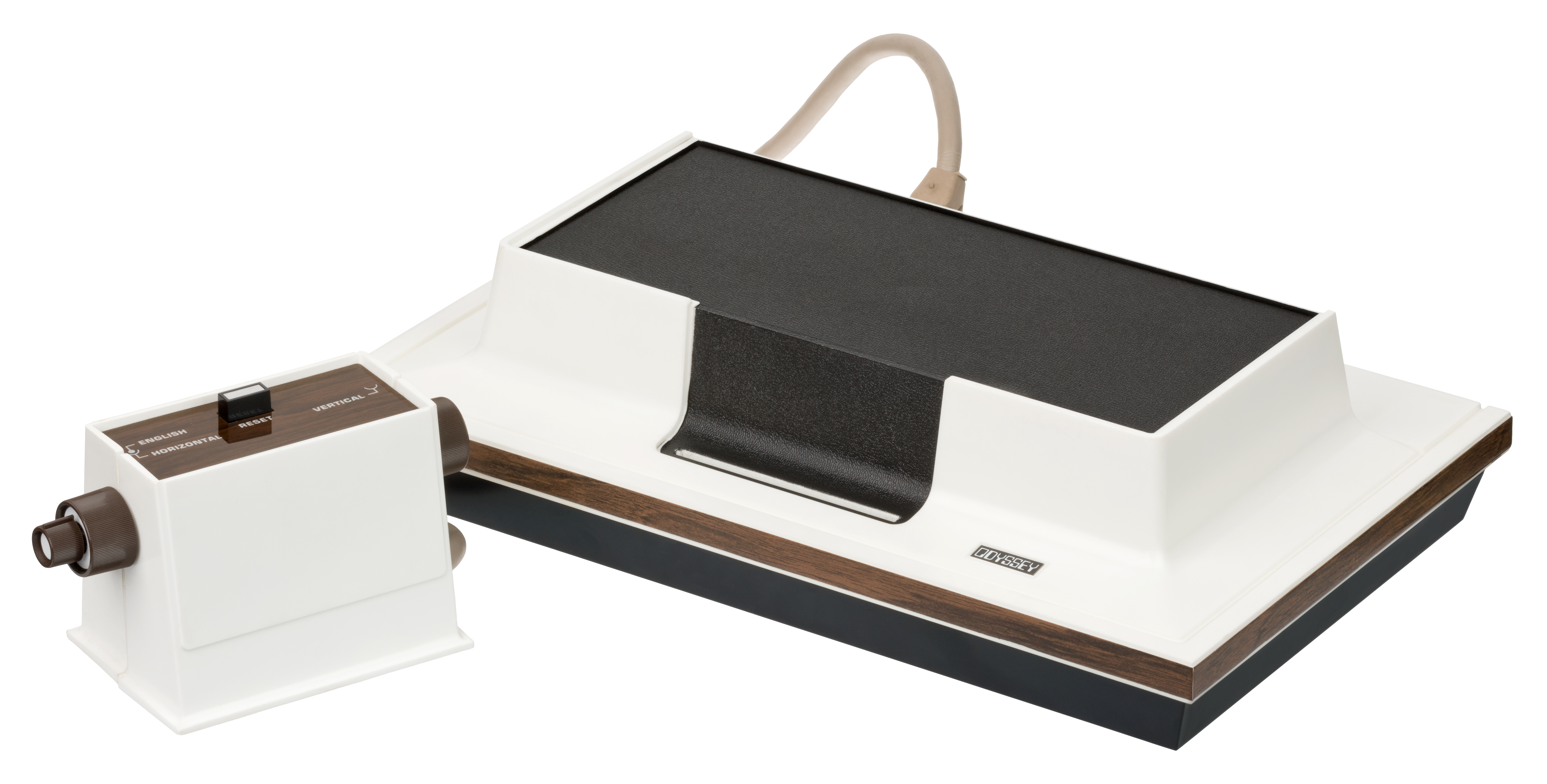
The Magnavox Odyssey, invented by Ralph H. Baer, inspired Pong's development.

In April 1974, Magnavox filed suit against Atari, Allied Leisure, Bally Midway and Chicago Dynamics. Magnavox argued that Atari had infringed on Sanders Associates' patents relating both to the concept of TV games generally and to the interaction of player and machine-controlled objects rendered on a screen and presented detailed records Ralph Baer kept of the Odyssey's design process dating back to 1966. Other documents included depositions from witnesses and a signed guest book that demonstrated Bushnell had played the Odyssey's table tennis game prior to releasing Pong. In response to claims that he saw the Odyssey, Bushnell later stated that, "The fact is that I absolutely did see the Odyssey game and I didn't think it was very clever."

After considering his options, Bushnell decided to settle with Magnavox out of court in June 1976. Bushnell's lawyer felt they could win; however, he estimated legal costs of US$1.5 million, which would have exceeded Atari's funds. Magnavox offered Atari an agreement to become a licensee for US$1.5 million payable in eight installments. In addition, Magnavox obtained the right to full information on Atari products publicly announced or released over the next year. Magnavox continued to pursue legal action against the other companies, and proceedings began shortly after Atari's settlement. The first case took place at the district court in Chicago, with Judge John Grady presiding. Magnavox won the suit against the remaining defendants. Atari may have delayed the announcement of the Atari 2600 by a few months to avoid disclosing information about the system under the settlement agreement.

== Impact and legacy ==
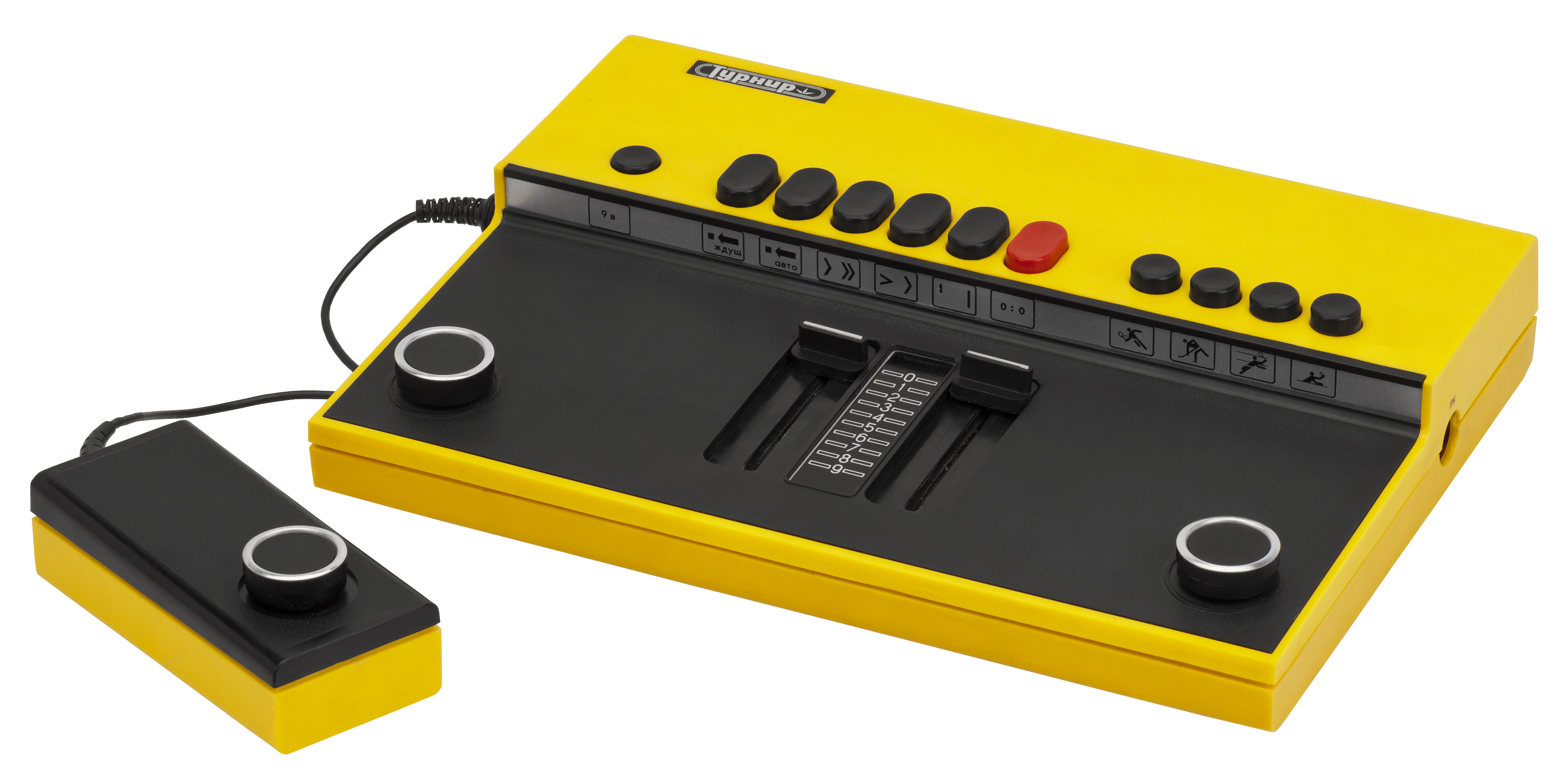
Dedicated Pong consoles made their way to various countries, like the Soviet Turnir.

The Pong arcade games manufactured by Atari were a great success. The prototype was well received by Andy Capp's Tavern patrons; people came to the bar solely to play the game. Following its release, Pong consistently earned four times more revenue than other coin-operated machines. Bushnell estimated that the game earned US$35–40 per day (i.e. 140–160 plays daily per console at $0.25 per play), which he described as nothing he'd ever seen before in the coin-operated entertainment industry at the time. The game's earning power resulted in an increase in the number of orders Atari received. This provided Atari with a steady source of income; the company sold the machines at three times the cost of production. By 1973, the company had filled 2,500 orders, and at the end of 1974, sold more than 8,000 units. The arcade cabinets have since become collector's items, with cocktail cabinets being the rarest. Soon after the game's successful testing at Andy Capp's Tavern, other companies began visiting the bar to inspect it. Similar games appeared on the market three months later, produced by companies like Ramtek and Nutting Associates. Atari could do little against the competitors as they had not initially filed for patents on the solid state technology used in the game. When the company did file for patents, complications delayed the process. As a result, the market consisted primarily of "Pong clones"; author Steven Kent estimated that Atari had produced less than a third of the machines. Bushnell referred to the competitors as "Jackals" because he felt they had an unfair advantage. His solution to competing against them was to produce more innovative games and concepts.

Home Pong was an instant success following its limited 1975 release through Sears; around 150,000 units were sold that holiday season. The game became Sears' most successful product at the time, which earned Atari a Sears Quality Excellence Award. Atari's own version sold an additional 50,000 units. Similar to the arcade version, several companies released clones to capitalize on the home console's success, many of which continued to produce new consoles and video games. Magnavox re-released their Odyssey system with simplified hardware and new features and, later, released updated versions. Coleco entered the video game market with their Telstar console; it features three Pong variants and was also succeeded by newer models. The dedicated Pong consoles and the numerous clones have since become varying levels of rare; Atari's Pong consoles are common, while APF Electronics' TV Fun consoles are moderately rare. Prices among collectors, however, vary with rarity; the Sears Tele-Games versions are often cheaper than those with the Atari brand.

Several publications consider Pong the game that launched the video game industry as a lucrative enterprise. Video game author David Ellis sees the game as the cornerstone of the video game industry's success, and called the arcade game "one of the most historically significant" titles. Kent attributes the "arcade phenomenon" to Pong and Atari's games that followed it, and considers the release of the home version the successful beginning of home video game consoles. Bill Loguidice and Matt Barton of Gamasutra referred to the game's release as the start of a new entertainment medium, and commented that its simple, intuitive gameplay made it a success. In 1995, Flux magazine ranked the game 56th on their "Top 100 Video Games." In 1996 Next Generation named it one of the "Top 100 Games of All Time", recounting that "Next Generation staff ignor[ed] hundreds of thousands of dollars of 32-bit software to play Pong for hours when the Genesis version was released." In 1999, Next Generation listed Pong as number 34 on their "Top 50 Games of All Time", commenting that, "Despite, or perhaps because of, its simplicity, Pong is the ultimate two-player challenge – a test of reaction times and very simple strategy stripped down to its barest essentials." Entertainment Weekly named Pong one of the top ten games for the Atari 2600 in 2013. Many of the companies that produced their own versions of Pong eventually became well known within the industry. Nintendo entered the video game market with clones of Home Pong. The revenue generated from them—two systems sold over a million units combined—helped the company survive a difficult financial time, and spurred them to pursue video games further. In 2015, The Strong National Museum of Play inducted Pong to its World Video Game Hall of Fame.

Bushnell felt that Pong was especially significant in its role as a social lubricant, since it was multiplayer-only and did not require each player to use more than one hand: "It was very common to have a girl with a quarter in hand pull a guy off a bar stool and say, 'I'd like to play Pong and there's nobody to play.' It was a way you could play games, you were sitting shoulder to shoulder, you could talk, you could laugh, you could challenge each other ... As you became better friends, you could put down your beer and hug. You could put your arm around the person. You could play left-handed if you so desired. In fact, there are a lot of people who have come up to me over the years and said, 'I met my wife playing Pong,' and that's kind of a nice thing to have achieved."

=== Ports ===
Atari remade the game on numerous platforms. In 1977, Pong and several variants of the game were featured in Video Olympics, one of the original release titles for the Atari 2600.

Pong has also been included in several Atari compilations on many different platforms, such as Arcade Classics on the Sega Genesis, Paired with Asteroids and Yars' Revenge on the Game Boy Advance. Atari Classics Evolved on the PlayStation Portable, Retro Atari Classics on the Nintendo DS, and Atari: 80 Classic Games in One! for personal computer, and the Atari 50: The Anniversary Celebration (2022) compilation for Nintendo Switch, PlayStation 4, Steam, and Xbox One.

Through an agreement with Atari, Bally Gaming and Systems developed a slot machine version of the game.

The game was also included as a loading screen minigame on the PlayStation 2 and Xbox versions of TD Overdrive: The Brotherhood of Speed; however, the Windows version does not include it.

=== Sequels and remakes ===
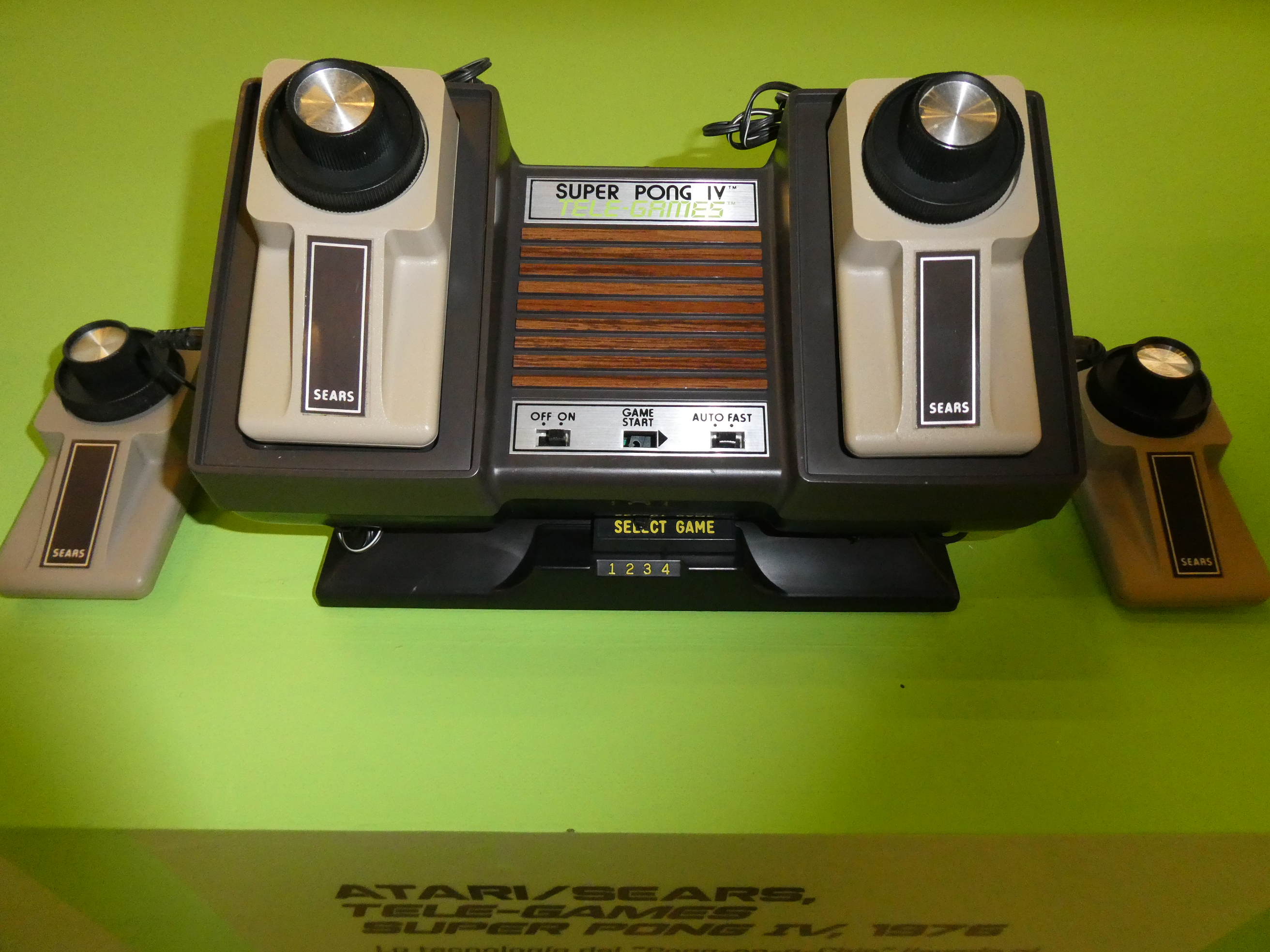
Tele-Games Pong IV, Sears' version of Pong sequel (Pong Doubles), was one of the many consoles that flooded the market by 1977.

Bushnell felt the best way to compete against imitators was to create better products, leading Atari to produce sequels in the years following the original's release: Pong Doubles, Super Pong, Quadrapong and Pin-Pong. The sequels feature similar graphics, but include new gameplay elements; for example, Pong Doubles allows four players to compete in pairs, while Quadrapong—also released by Kee Games as Elimination—has them compete against each other in a four-way field. Pin-Pong was called by Atari the "only video game simulating play of the classic pin-ball machine". Bushnell also conceptualized a free-to-play version of Pong to entertain children in a doctor's office. He initially titled it Snoopy Pong and fashioned the cabinet after Snoopy's doghouse with the character on top, but retitled it to Puppy Pong and altered Snoopy to a generic dog to avoid legal action. Bushnell later used the game in his chain of Chuck E. Cheese's restaurants. In 1976, Atari released Breakout, a single-player variation of Pong where the object of the game is to remove bricks from a wall by hitting them with a ball. Like Pong, Breakout was followed by numerous clones that copied the basic gameplay, such as Arkanoid, Alleyway, and Break 'Em All.

A 3D platform game with puzzle and shooter elements was reportedly in development by Atari Corporation for the Atari Jaguar in September 1995 under the title Pong 2000, as part of their series of arcade game updates for the system and was set to have an original storyline for it, but it was never released.

In 1999, Hasbro Interactive released a new title known as Pong: The Next Level for home computers and the PlayStation. This game was released as part of a trend within the time period of popular arcade games being remade with 3D graphics and art styles. The game also featured many power-ups.

In 2012, Atari celebrated the 40th anniversary of Pong by releasing Pong World for iOS, which was developed by zGames. In 2020, a new game titled Pong Quest was developed by Chequered Ink and released by Atari on Windows, PlayStation 4, Xbox One, and Nintendo Switch. A remake of Pong has been announced for release exclusively for the Intellivision Amico.

=== In popular culture ===
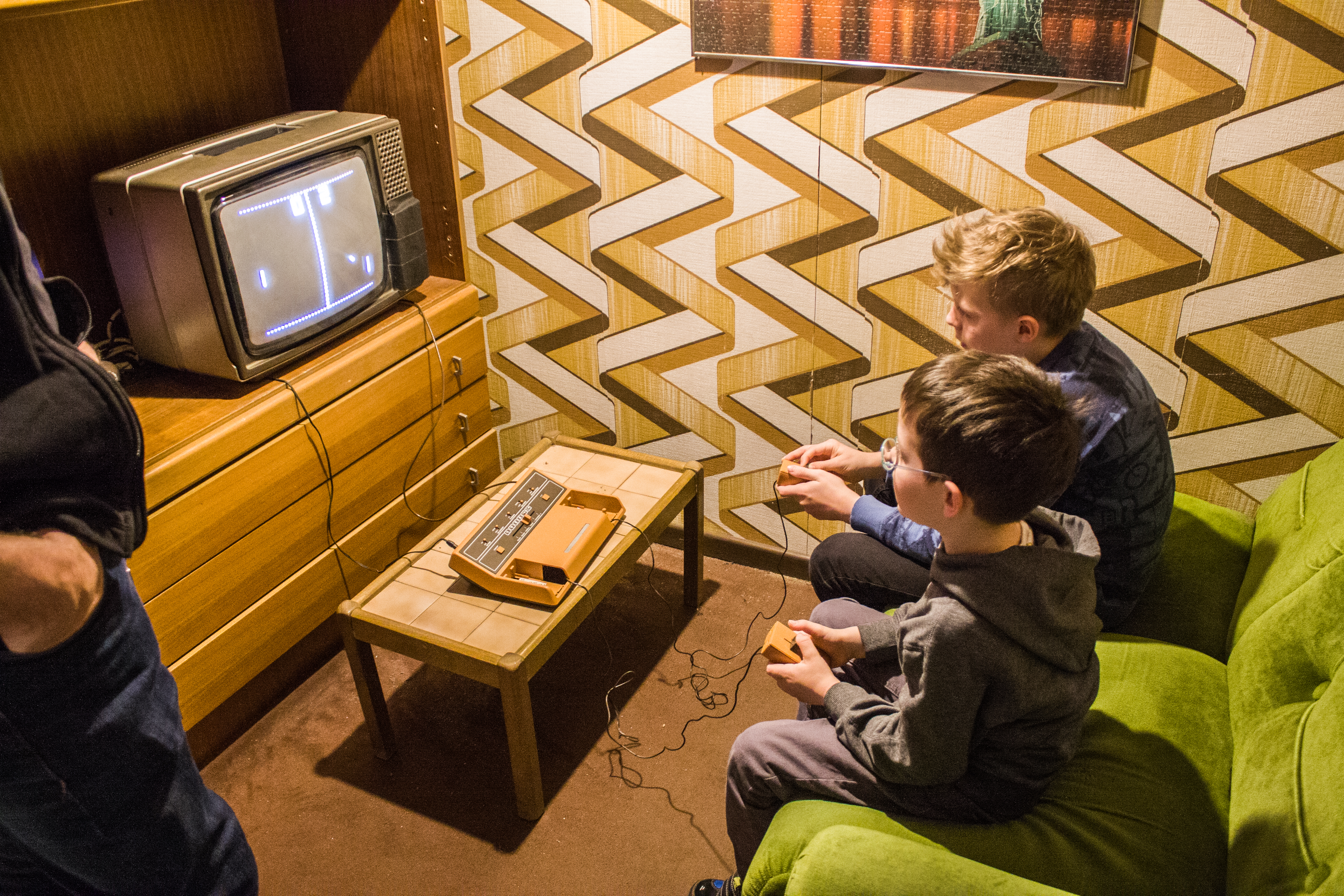
First-generation Pong console in a retro 1970s installation at the Computerspielemuseum Berlin, pictured in 2017

The game is featured in episodes of television series including That '70s Show, King of the Hill and Saturday Night Live. In 2006, an American Express commercial featured Andy Roddick in a tennis match against the white, in-game paddle. Other video games have also referenced and parodied Pong; for example Neuromancer for the Commodore 64 and Banjo-Kazooie: Nuts & Bolts for the Xbox 360. The concert event Video Games Live has performed audio from Pong as part of a special retro "Classic Arcade Medley". Frank Black's song "Whatever Happened to Pong?" on the album Teenager of the Year references the game's elements.

Dutch design studio Buro Vormkrijgers created a Pong-themed clock as a fun project within their offices. After the studio decided to manufacture it for retail, Atari took legal action in February 2006. The two companies eventually reached an agreement in which Buro Vormkrijgers could produce a limited number under license. In 1999, French artist Pierre Huyghe created an installation titled "Atari Light", in which two people use handheld gaming devices to play Pong on an illuminated ceiling. The work was shown at the Venice Biennale in 2001, and the Museo de Arte Contemporáneo de Castilla y León in 2007. The game was included in the London Barbican Art Gallery's 2002 Game On exhibition meant to showcase the various aspects of video game history, development, and culture.

Starting in 2012, Chuck E. Cheese's began referencing Pong as a part of the rebranding of its eponymous mascot. According to a backstory of the character published in 2014, Chuck E. won $50 in a Pong tournament and moved to New York City, where he eventually met the rest of the band members.

A licensed version of the original cabinet released in 2026 for use in arcades in the video game Planet Coaster 2.
