= Baffle Ball =

1931 pinball machine

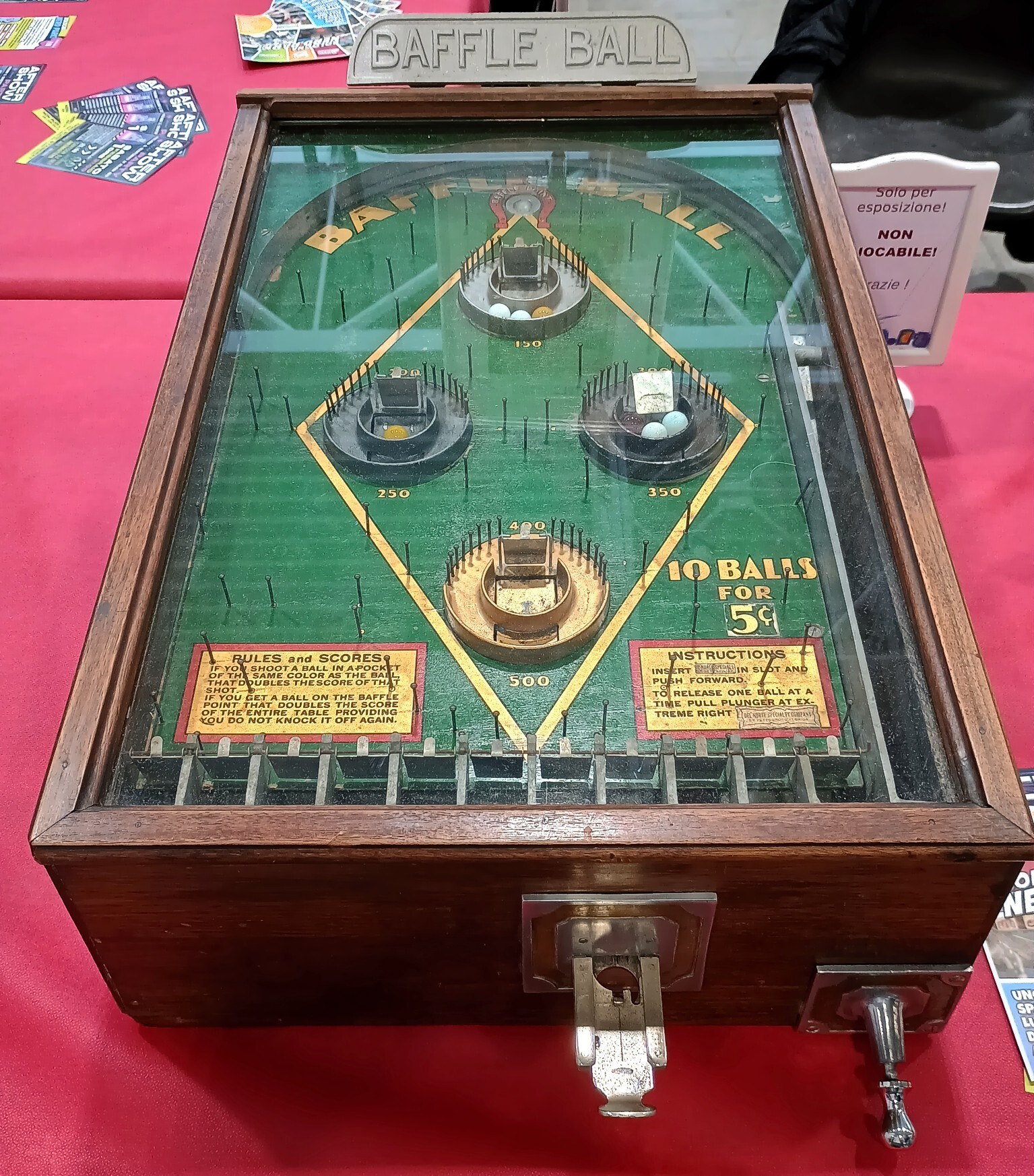
- Manufacturer: D. Gottlieb & Co.
- Release date: October 1931
- Players: 1
- Design: David Gottlieb & John Keeney
- Mechanics: Purely Mechanical
- Production run: > 50,000

Baffle Ball is a pinball machine created on October 6, 1931 by David Gottlieb, founder of the Gottlieb amusement company, in collaboration with John H. Keeney of Keeney & Sons. Unlike modern pinball machines, Baffle Ball lacks flippers, relying instead on a mechanical playfield design inspired by parlor bagatelle games.

== History ==
In 1931, during the Great Depression, David Gottlieb saw potential in coin-operated amusement games after observing the success of Roll-a-ball. Gottlieb obtained exclusive manufacturing and distribution rights for a game called Bingo, which he redesigned to improve the quality and to make it easier to manufacture. Unable to keep up with orders Gottlieb subcontracted Keeney & Sons to also manufacture Bingo. With both manufacturing and marketing it Bingo became one of the leading coin-operated products on the market.

Gottlieb's financiers reneged on their exclusive deal with him when approached by an offer for national distribution of Bingo. This caused Gottlieb to start over and create his own pin game that he would call Baffle Ball. Gottlieb continued to improve efficiency in the manufacturing process based on the assembly line method that had transformed the auto industry. This caused Baffle Ball to be the first pin game to achieve high volume production. Gottlieb received over 75,000 orders for the game and even with the improvements to manufacturing could only produce about 400 per day filling roughly 50,000 of them.

== Design and mechanics ==
Baffle Ball's playfield is painted with vibrant colors to entice players. It includes instructions to the player on the bottom right as well as rules and scoring on the bottom left. The four metal cups in the center of the playfield each have a one-way tilting gate. The layout includes a baseball diamond in its iconography, but otherwise has no connection with baseball. Many games state "a game of skill for amusement only" in the middle of the playfield. The playfield is covered with a sheet of glass to prevent players tampering with the balls.

Baffle Ball uses a simple coin mechanism which had been introduced in a pinball machine earlier the same year called Whiffle. While bagatelle-derived "marble games" had long existed previously, Baffle Ball was the first commercially successful game of its type, being affordable enough for store and tavern owners to recoup the machine's US$17.50 cost in a few days.

== Components ==
=== Cabinet ===
US Patent 1,966,862

The cabinet of Baffle Ball is rectangular and wooden with the playfield contained inside under glass.

=== Playfield ===
The playfield is an inclined wooden surface beneath the glass top, designed to guide balls downward via gravity. The playfield includes four main scoring cups as well as scoring positions of varying scores at the bottom of the playfield where the balls collect before reset. The balls are placed into the playfield by means of the plunger, a spring-loaded device that consists of a rod extending through the cabinet wall and fitted with a spring. The playfield also contains four metal cups in the middle of the playfield, arranged in a diamond pattern, and a metal collection area near the bottom of the playfield with varying scores.

=== Plunger ===
The plunger is a spring-loaded device at the front-right corner of the cabinet, positioned at the lower-right end of the ball channel. It consists of a rod extending through the cabinet wall, topped with a brass knob for manual operation. A helical spring launches the ball forward and up onto the playfield via the ball channel when released.

=== Coin mechanism ===
The coin mechanism is a coin controlled system that governs the release of the balls. Costing 1 cent for 10 balls it included a normally locked, manually operated lever that when activated by a coin would shift the gates beneath the playfield releasing the balls and beginning a new game.

== Gameplay and techniques ==
For one US cent (equivalent to 21 cents in 2025) players get ten balls. These balls are launched up onto the playfield and fall into pockets and holes. Some ball targets are worth more than others, and matching the color of a ball to a pocket doubles that shot. The best target is the Baffle point at the top which doubles all other points. The game uses no electricity, and all scoring has to be done by hand.

The primary skill of Baffle Ball involves the proper amount of tension on the plunger to propel the balls with varying amounts of speed and angle onto the playfield. With practice a player can place balls around the table where they had intended.

=== Nudging ===
Players can influence the movement of the ball by slightly moving or bumping the machine cabinet, a technique known as "nudging". Baffle Ball predates all tilt mechanisms which guard against excessive manipulation of this sort, but nudging too hard can cause a ball to roll off the score doubling baffle point. Modern pinball games warn the player before eventually sacrificing the ball in play.

== Video game simulations ==
Baffle Ball has been virtually recreated in the pinball simulation video game, Microsoft Pinball Arcade. Colored balls, that correspond to the colors of the targets, are used. Extra points are awarded if the player lands the ball in the target that matches the color of the ball.

Baffle Ball has also been made into Visual Pinball game.

== Legacy ==
Initial versions gave the player 10 balls, but some later variants were produced with 5 or 7 balls. A home version was also released, and a version with detachable legs, called Baffle Ball Senior, released in 1932.

The game sat on top of bar counters and the bartender might award prizes for high scores.

Electric Baffle Ball was released in October 1935, and with novel uses for its signal light was operated in locations not usually associated with gaming. This was named in tribute after Baffle Ball but has a completely different design.

Gottlieb's inability to produce more than 400 machines a day led one of his distributors, Raymond Moloney, to seek a new game for distribution. After partnering with his investors to create a new division, they aggressively marketed and distributed their competing game Ballyhoo under the company name Bally Manufacturing Company.

At the end of the 20th century, it was still regarded as the game that launched all subsequent pinball games.

== See also ==
- Play-Boy - the follow-up game
