= Play-Boy (pinball) =

1932 pinball machine

- Manufacturer: D. Gottlieb & Co.
- Release date: February 1932
- System: Purely Mechanical

Play-Boy is a pinball machine released by Gottlieb in 1932. The game features a card gambling theme. It should not be confused with several other pinball machines with the name Playboy as from Chicago Coin (1947), Rally Play Company (1967), Bally (1978), Data East (1989) and Stern (2002).

== Design and production ==
After the success of Baffle Ball, Gottlieb used the existing production line to produce a new game using the same cabinet as Baffle Ball. The new playfield was cheaper to produce because the former game's aluminium pieces were not required. The game is the first in a series of Gottlieb games to use a card based playfield, using a full deck of 52 cards, with a hard to hit Joker.

Similar to Baffle Ball, Keeney & Sons were contracted to make manufacture some of the machines. The standard version was advertised as 24 inches long by 16 inches wide (60 by 40 centimeters). Additional versions were produced: a larger table version on legs, called Play-Boy Sr., and a longer version called Master Playboy was introduced in April 1932. The game was advertised to pay for itself in a few days.

== Gameplay ==
10 balls cost 1 US cent (equivalent to 20 cents in 2025) with 5 balls each, if two players were playing. Players can play for accumulated points or play card games such as blackjack or poker by landing their balls in the holes for each card.

== Reception ==
Based on the "tremendous popularity of cards" the game was an instantaneous hit. Production of Baffle Ball was stopped due to demand for this machine.

== Legacy ==
Due to the success of this machine Gottlieb produced pinball games based on cards for over forty years.

== Digital versions ==
Play-Boy was released in the Pinball Hall of Fame: The Gottlieb Collection. Unlike the physical version where the player adds up their points, this version calculates the score.
