= Raymond Moloney =

American inventor

Raymond T. Moloney
- Born: November 2, 1900; Cleveland, Ohio, USA
- Died: February 26, 1958 (aged 57); Chicago, Illinois, USA
- Occupations: Businessman; Entrepreneur; Industrial Designer
- Known for: Ballyhoo machine; Bally Manufacturing

Raymond T. Moloney (November 2, 1900 - February 26, 1958) was an American businessman, and the founder of Bally Manufacturing Corporation. He was instrumental in popularizing the pinball machine, and was regarded, at the time, as "Mr. Coin Machine Industry".

== Biography ==
He was born on November 11, 1900, in Cleveland, Ohio, the son of Daniel J. Moloney, a steelworker, and Gertrude Smith. He spent his early adult life in a variety of jobs, including in the oil fields of Texas, harvesting crops in California, and working in sugar refineries in the South. Ultimately, he returned to Cleveland to work with his father at the steel mill, as a foreman.

In 1921 he relocated to Chicago, where he started working in a print shop, making punchboards. He was eventually put in charge of the punchboard operation, for which a subsidiary, Lion Manufacturing Company, was created. Later, Midwest Novelty Company was established as a subsidiary of Lion, to distribute coin-operated products such as slot machines and trade stimulators via mail order. Moloney served as president of Lion and Midwest Novelty.

When Gottlieb's Baffle Ball started to become popular, Moloney tried to secure a steady supply of Baffle Ball cabinets for Midwest Novelty. Frustrated with Gottlieb's inability to supply the machines quickly enough, Moloney decided to start producing pin games himself. He acquired a pin game design from freelance designers Oliver Van Tyle and Oscar Bloom, and designed a colorful playfield based on the cover of the December 1931 edition of satirical magazine Ballyhoo.

To avoid risking the existing business, Moloney and his partners established a new company, Bally Manufacturing Company, dedicated to the production of pinball machines. Ballyhoo was released in January 1932, with a price of $16.50 per machine, a relatively affordable price for operators at the time. The machine was a great success, selling 50,000 units in its first seven months. Before the end of the year, a second hit, Goofy, was released. A third game, Airways, was released the next year; it too proved highly successful, and helped expand the popularity of pinball in Europe.
