= Whiffle =

First coin-operated pinball machine

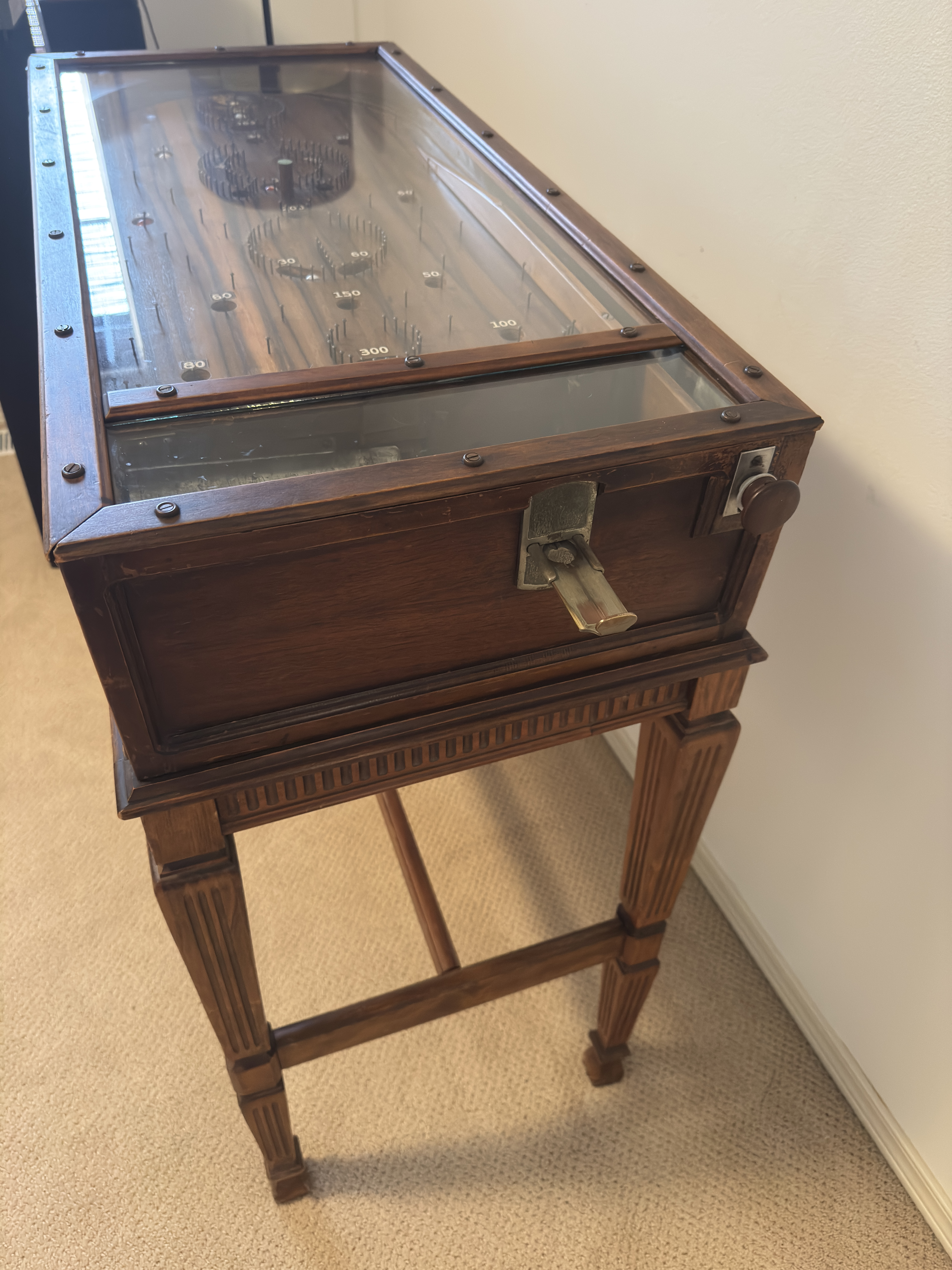
- Manufacturer: Automatic Industries, Inc.
- Release date: January 1931
- Design: Arthur L. Paulin, Earl W. Froom
- Production run: > 27,000

Whiffle is a pinball machine that was invented in 1931 by Arthur L. Paulin and Earl W. Froom out of Youngstown, Ohio. The Whiffle machine is commonly referred to as the first pinball machine despite the lack of flippers, standard on all modern pinball machines.

The Whiffle game shares many of the game elements one would find in any pinball machine; various obstacles (pins, posts, walls), different scoring hole values, clear glass covering playfield, limited number of balls (10) and differently colored balls for scoring incentives. One way Whiffle is different from pinball is that there are no bumpers or other electronic scoring mechanics as the Whiffle predates electricity being added to pinball

The object of the game is to score as many points as possible by using the spring-loaded plunger to propel one of the games 10 balls into a scoring hole and repeating this until all the balls are played. With very little practice one could be able to place the balls around on the table much the same as Pool.

== History ==
Arthur Paulin found an old board with holes and nails, in his barn, around Christmas 1930. This board is often linked to British bagatelle marble games and its said that Paulin adapted this board into a Christmas gift for his daughter Lois. Lois loved the game so much that it drew other neighborhood children, leading to its commercial potential.

Paulin partnered with his friend Earl W. Froom, a salesman, and two others Myrl A. Park and William B. Howell and on January 28, 1931 the company Automatic Industries was founded. With their first prototype "Old Jenny" being worked on and perfected after Park mentioned to Earl and Arthur that they should put a coin device on it and let the public pay to play.

=== Company and production ===
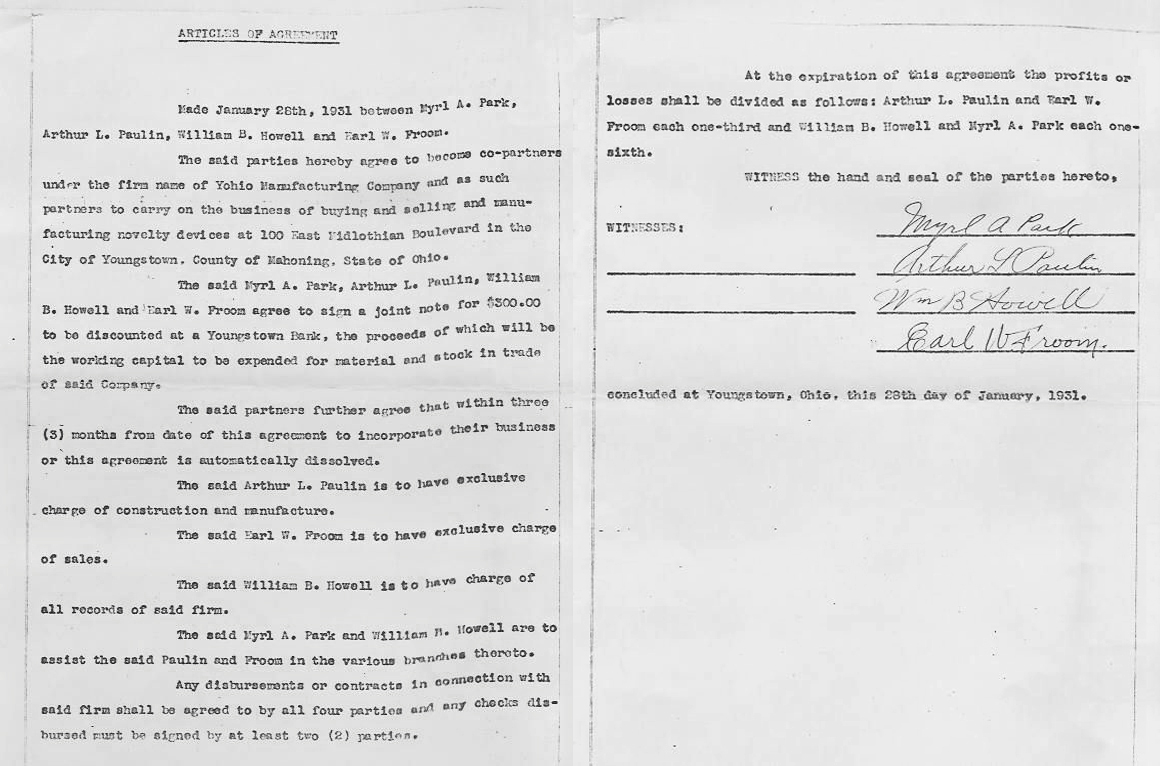
Scan of the original articles of agreement between the inventors and investors of the Whiffle Board

Automatic Industries was based out of Youngstown, Ohio with additional offices in Kansas City, Missouri and Toronto, Ontario and it grew rapidly. Along with a rented, second-floor space, the company outgrew multiple locations before deciding to build their own facility due to the demand for the Whiffle.

At its peak the company employed 53 shop workers and 13 office staff. During this time the company produced several Whiffle variants, including; Automatic Whiffle, Baby Whiffle, Champion Whiffle, Improved Whiffle, Whiffle Board, Whiffle Board Deluxe, Whiffle Delux, Whifflette and Whiffle-Zip which was the first electro-mechanical version of the Whiffle which included the use of magnets to move balls. While exact production totals are unclear Earl Froom was quoted as saying, "We Built 27,000 Whiffle games the first year. Then things got tough. We sold it for $100. It had some real cabinetry, real walnut. We made a fine machine. Then Bally comes out with something small for $12.50 in a box with some colored silk screening on a board. It was junk and was in a lot of colors. How do you fight that?"

=== Design and mechanics ===
The U.S. Patent No. 1,938,495

The Whiffle machine features a real walnut cabinet with brass hardware, a glass-covered wooden playfield, and a manual operation system. The playfield consists of pins (small nails) and numbered holes (ex. 10, 20, 30, 50, 60, 80, 100, 300) with the balls propelled by a spring-loaded plunger. The Whiffle is one of the first coin-operated pinball machines in the US. For 5 cents players would receive 10 balls, 9 white and 1 red and the object was to try to place the ball in the highest possible scoring combination.

=== Cultural impact and controversy ===
The Whiffle's popularity spawned many imitators and outright copycats which sparked the "pinball patent wars" of the 1930's. Racketeers got involved with the business and would often smash other operator's games on location and replace it with their own game.

=== Collector value and scarcity ===
Today, Whiffle machines that are intact are rare. The International Arcade Museum classifies them as "Rare". Pinside has a map on their listing of the Whiffle machine that lists all the known locations of the Whiffle game and there are 11 listed with only 4 public locations to view the Whiffle.

=== Obsolescence and decline ===
While Whiffle was popular Automatic Industries could not keep up with demand and the incoming pressure on price by competitors like Baffle Ball which was much cheaper and could be bought outright as opposed to lease only as the Whiffle was.

Bob Froom (Earl's son) tells a story about how the game was easy to copy and Chicago game manufacturers began to produce copies of the game. One North Carolina company actually started copying the Whiffle so closely that they went to the trouble of putting Automatic Industries name on the clones. Froom was quoted as saying, "The problem got so bad that many places tried to pass laws banning pinball games, which often resulted in court decisions against the games business". There was also gambling that occurred and led to the banning of pinball in New York on January 21, 1942.

== Components ==
=== Cabinet ===
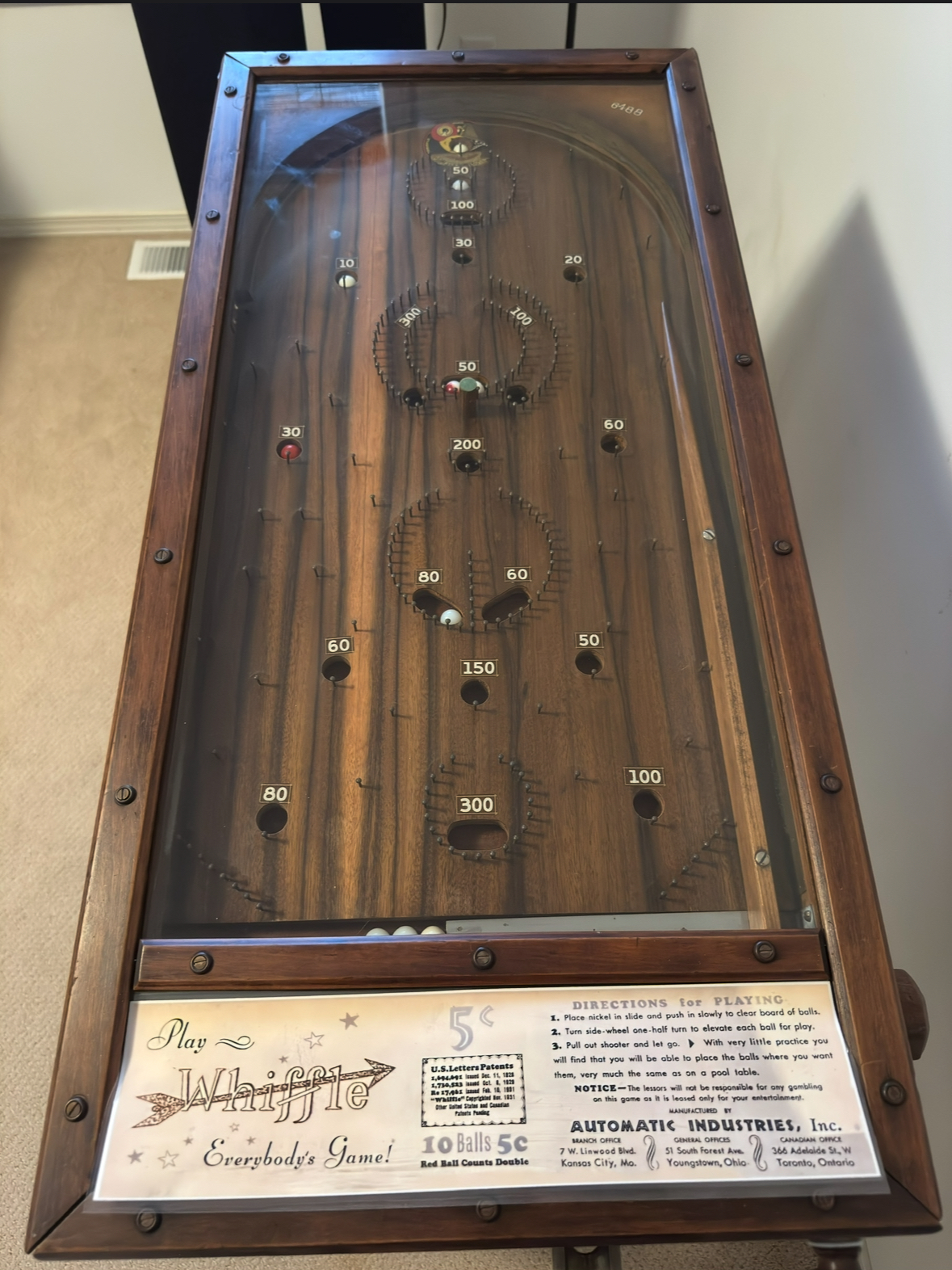
The Playfield of the Whiffle board

The cabinet of the Whiffle is rectangular and wooden (walnut) with the playfield contained inside under glass.

=== Playfield ===
The playfield is an inclined wooden surface beneath the glass top, designed to guide balls downward via gravity. It includes multiple scoring holes or zones of varying size and score. The balls are placed into the playfield by means of the plunger, a spring-loaded device that consists of a rod extending through the cabinet wall and fitted with a spring.

=== Plunger ===
The plunger is a spring-loaded device at the front-right corner of the cabinet, positioned at the lower right end of the ball channel. It consists of a rod extending through the cabinet wall, topped with a wooden knob for manual operation. A helical spring launches the ball forward and up the playfield ball channel when released. Balls elevated by the ball elevator roll into position in front of the plunger allowing the player to shoot balls into the playfield with controlled force.

=== Ball elevator ===
The ball elevator returns played balls to the launch position via an elevating wheel housed within the cabinet's right side wall, mounted on an external panel. The wheel has two holes that when rotated, collects a single ball from the inclined runway beneath the playfield, then when rotated again, deposits that collected ball into the ball channel. This process should be continued until all 10 balls have been played.

=== Coin mechanism ===
The coin mechanism is a coin controlled system that governs the ball release. Costing 5 cents for 10 balls it included a normally locked, manually operated lever that when activated by a coin would shift the sliding gate beneath the playfield beginning a new game.

== Gameplay features ==
Whiffle is a coin-operated, skill based bagatelle-style game that relies on precision, strategy and chance. Marketed as "Everybody's Game!" by Automatic Industries, Inc.

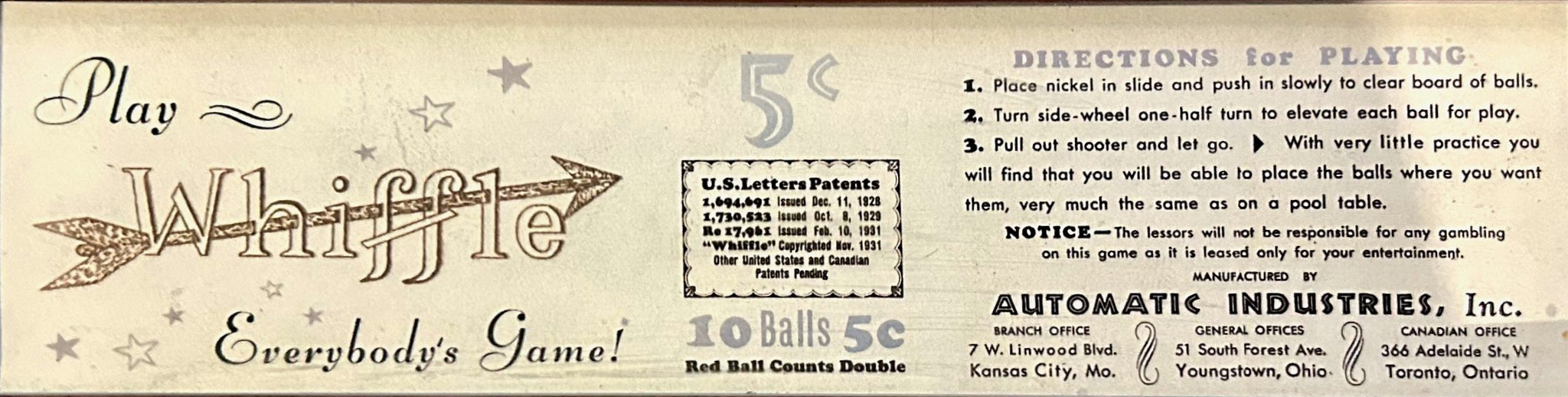
Instructions to the player on how the game is played

Gameplay features these key components;

- Coin Operated Start: Players begin by inserting a nickel into a coin slot and pushing it all the way in. This clears the playfield of any balls from a previous game and resets the board for a new round. The coin mechanism ensures that the game is pay to play and prepares the game by releasing the balls.
- Multiple balls per game: For 5 cents a player would receive 10 balls to play, allowing for multiple attempts to build a cumulative high score. This feature extends playtime and allows for a player to refine their technique to maximize points.
- Spring-loaded plunger: A spring-loaded plunger referred to as the plunger is located along the right side of the shooting lane. A player would pull it back and release it to propel a ball onto the inclined playfield. The force and angle of the pull on the plunger determine the ball's initial launch speed and angle.
- Skill based aiming: The instruction card notes that "With very little practice you will find that you will be able to place the balls where you want them, very much the same as on a pool table."
- Scoring Holes: The playfield features multiple circular holes of varying sizes, each labeled with a point value ranging from 10 to 300 points. Low values such as 20 and 30 are in easier to reach areas like the sides and bottom. High value holes are guarded by pins or surrounded by lower values holes.
- Red ball bonus: Noted on the instructions card is that the red ball counts double. If the red ball were to land in a hole the score for that hole is doubled (ex. a 150 point hole would then score 300). This adds a strategic element encouraging the player to prioritize the red ball for high value holes.
- Visual engagement: The clear glass top allows players to watch the ball as it bounces around off the pins and settles into a hole. Seeing how each shot navigates the playfield informs the next shot.

== Scoring points ==
In the game of Whiffle players score points by launching balls onto an inclined playfield and aiming for them to land in the various scoring holes. The game combines elements of skill and chance. Play continues by launching balls until all 10 balls have been played and rest on the playfield. When play has completed the player then counts their score by adding up all scoring holes that have balls in them.

For each of the 9 white balls simply add up the point values for whatever hole it has landed in. For the red ball double the point value of the hole where it landed and add that to the total. If the player was able to get a ball into the double your score hole then after the player has added up all the scores for the white and red balls the player would then double that amount for their final score.

== Gameplay techniques ==
The primary skill of Whiffle involves the application of the proper amount of tension on the plunger. The amount of tension and the angle at which the plunger is manipulated to strike the ball affects the speed and angle of attack the ball has when it reaches the playfield. With practice the player can adjust the tension and angle of the plunger to place balls around the playfield where they intend.

The playfield has a piece of metal on the top left of the playfield that acts as a spring that the player can aim for thus causing the ball to bounce off and change course.

=== Nudging ===
Players can influence the movement of the ball by slightly moving or bumping the Whiffle machine cabinet, a technique known as "nudging". Whiffle predates all tilt mechanisms which guard against excessive manipulation of this sort. Modern pinball games warn the player before eventually sacrificing the ball in play.

== Video game simulations ==
=== Simulations ===
Whiffle has been simulated as a Visual Pinball recreation.

Visual Pinball provides a way for the player to experience the Whiffle game without having to travel to one of the few locations where Whiffle can be seen/played.
