= Turnir =

Home video game console

Турнир
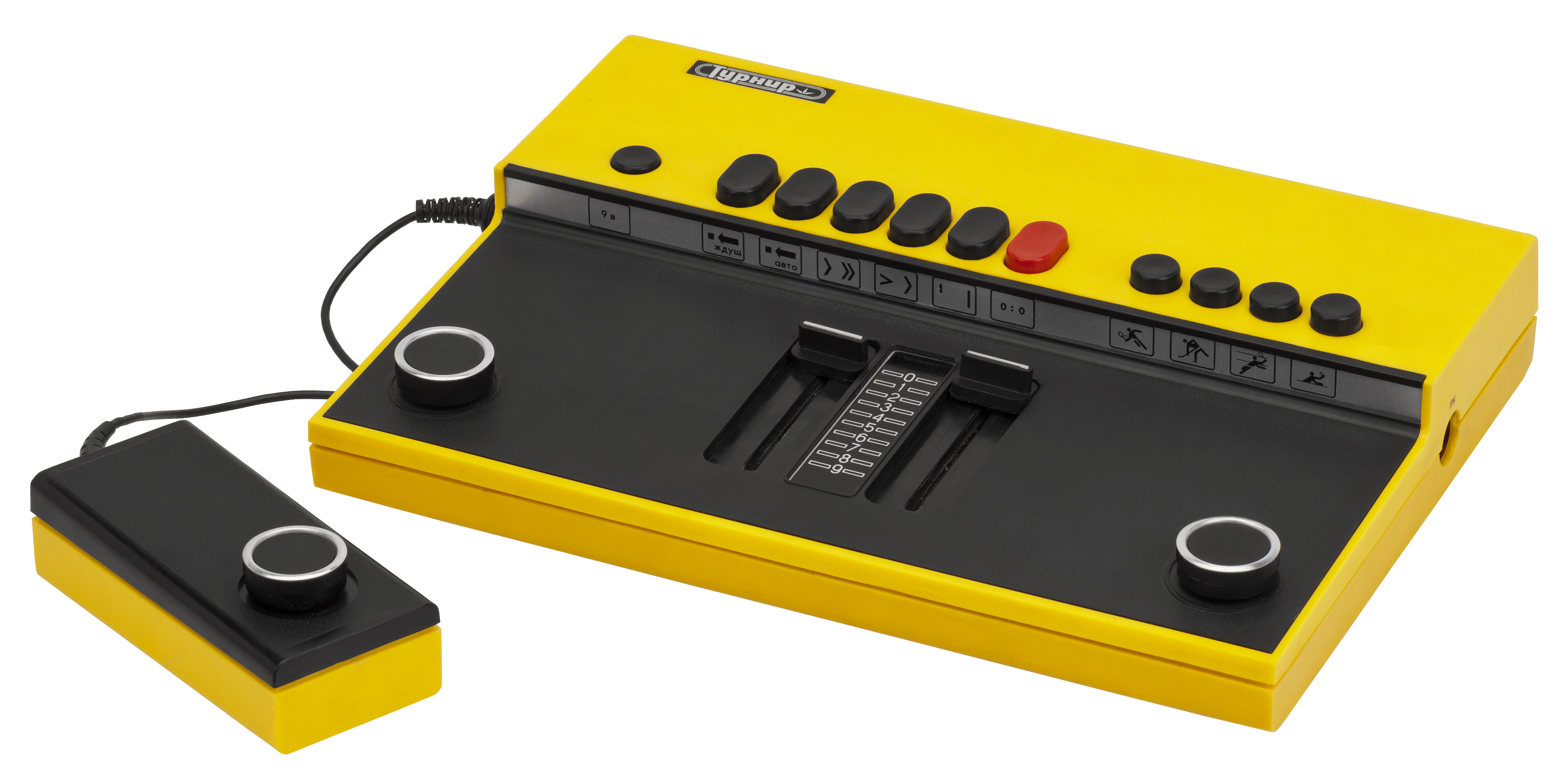
- A Turnir with its two accompanying paddle–based game controllers
- Also known as: Turnir
- Manufacturer: Ministry of the Electronics Industry
- Type: Dedicated home video game console
- Generation: First generation
- Lifespan: 1978–1982
- Introductory price: 150 Soviet rubles
- Power: Integrated AC: adapter/9 V
- Weight: 2.5 kg

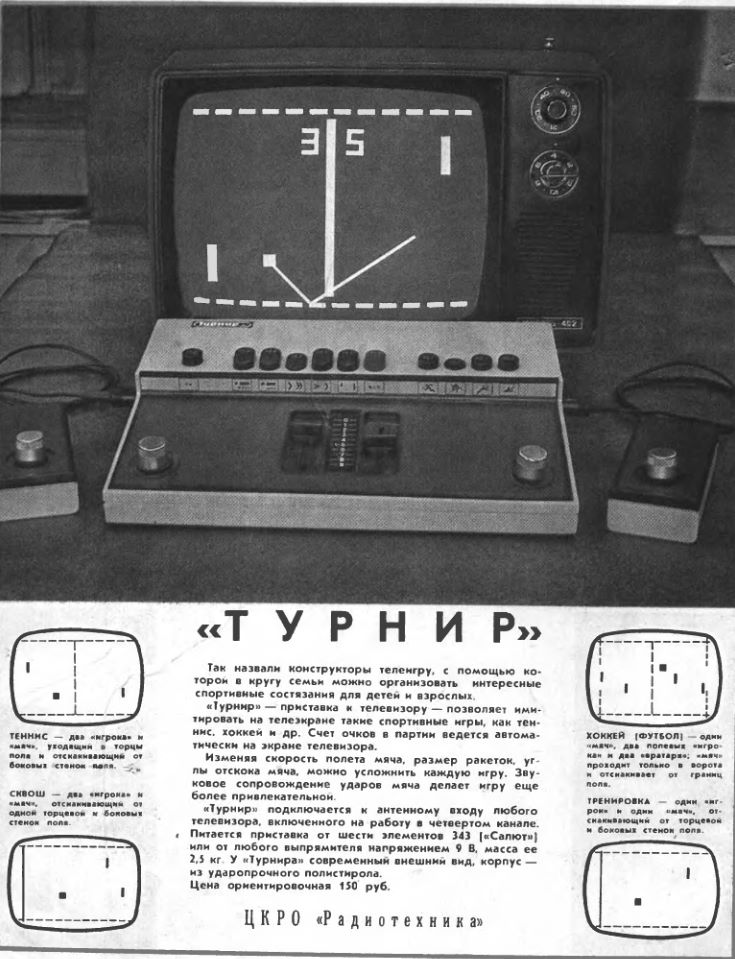
Advertisement for the Turnir, displaying the four game modes

The Turnir (Russian: Турнир, lit. 'Tournament') is a dedicated first-generation home video game console that was manufactured by the Ministry of the Electronics Industry and released in 1978 only in the Soviet Union. It was manufactured between 1978 and 1982 and is the only known Soviet video game console that uses the AY-3-8500 chipset from General Instrument. The price for the system varied from 150 Soviet rubles in 1978 to 96 rubles in the late 1980s. The console uses an integrated AC adapter with a voltage of 9 volts and has a mass of 2.5 kg.

== Games ==
Due to the integrated AY-8-8500 chip, the Turnir is able to play the following four games:

- Tennis (Russian: теннис), the standard Pong
- Hockey/Football (Russian: хоккей/футбол), in which each player has two paddles
- Squash (Russian: сквош), in which each player plays the ball off of one wall
- Training (Russian: тренировка), a one-paddle mode for practice
