= Trade stimulator =

Game machine found in shops

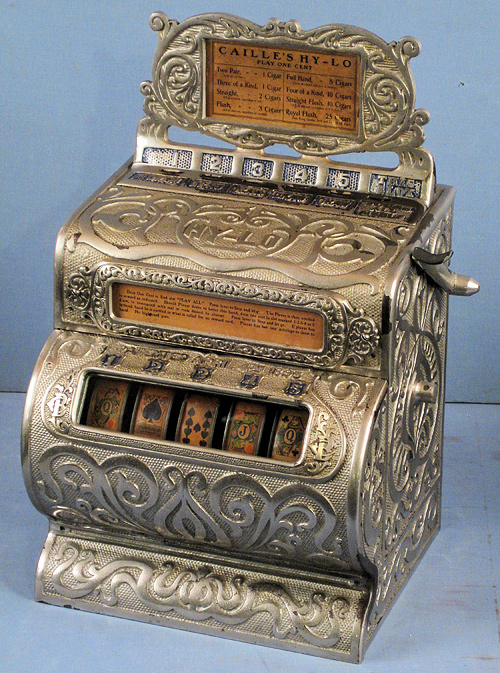

Trade stimulators were countertop machines widely used to encourage shoppers to indulge in a game of chance. They became popular in American saloons during the 1880s, their use spreading to cigar, confectionery and general stores. Produced in a wide range of designs, they were developed during the same era as slot machines and were operated by inserting a coin and pulling a lever, the player standing to win prizes of cigars, cigarettes, candy and other goods if a winning combination came up. During periods when gambling was prohibited or in states where gambling was illegal, these machines could be used with little fear of prosecution.

== See also ==
- Caille Bros. Company
- Mills Novelty Company
- H. C. Evans
- Slot machine
- Amusement arcade
