= Bally Manufacturing =

American company

- Industry: Interactive entertainment
- Founded: January 10, 1932; 94 years ago
- Founder: Raymond Moloney
- Defunct: December 18, 1996; 29 years ago
- Fate: Acquired by Hilton, brand name sold/licensed to multiple companies
- Successor: Bally Technologies; Bally's Corporation; Bally Total Fitness; Bally Wulff; Bally France; Bally Pond
- Headquarters: Chicago
- Products: Pinball, slot machines, later expanded into casinos, video games, health clubs, and theme parks

Bally Manufacturing, later renamed Bally Entertainment, was an American company that began as a pinball and slot machine manufacturer, and later expanded into casinos, video games, health clubs, and theme parks. It was acquired by Hilton Hotels in 1996.

Its brand name, and mid-20th century pinball and slot machine logo, are still used by several businesses with various acquired trademark rights, most notably slot machine maker Bally Technologies and casino operator Bally's Corporation.

== History ==
The Bally Manufacturing Corporation was founded by Raymond Moloney on January 10, 1932, when Bally's parent Lion Manufacturing established the company to make pinball games, taking its name from its first game "Ballyhoo". The Chicago-based company quickly became a leading pinball maker. In the late 1930s, Moloney began making gambling equipment and had great success developing and improving the mechanical slot machines that were the core of the early gaming industry. The company manufactured munitions and airplane parts during World War II, then continued producing innovations in flipperless pinball machines, bingo machines, payout machines, and console slot machines through the late 1950s. They also designed and manufactured vending machines and established a coffee vending service. They also made a brief venture into the music business with the record label Bally Records.

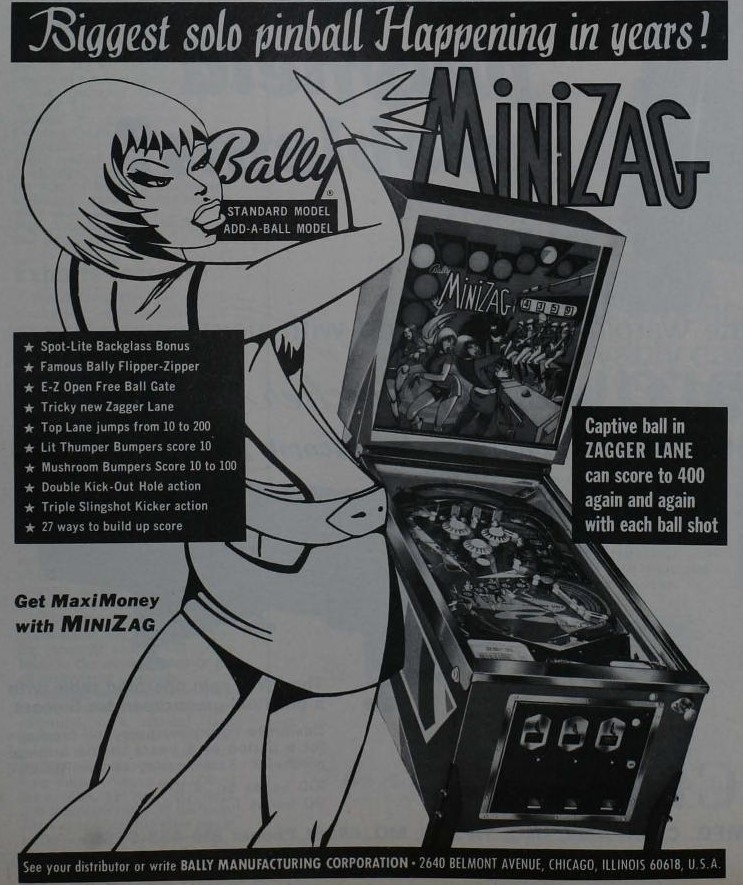
1968 advertisement for the Bally's Minizag pinball machine

Moloney died in 1958, and the company briefly floundered. The parent company failed financially, and Bally was bought out by a group of investors in 1963. Throughout the 1960s, Bally continued to dominate the slot machine industry, cornering over 90-percent of the worldwide market by the end of the decade. In 1964, Bally introduced the first electromechanical slot machine Money Honey. Around 1968 it bought the Lenc-Smith company which manufactured Bally pinball and arcade cabinets until 1988. It became a publicly traded company and acquired Midway Manufacturing in 1969, an amusement game company from Schiller Park, Illinois.

=== 1970s ===
The company expanded internationally in 1974 when it acquired German company Guenter Wulff-Apparatebau, which was renamed Bally Wulff.

In the late 1970s, Bally entered the casino ownership business when gambling was legalized in Atlantic City, New Jersey. The effort moved forward even though the company was temporarily unable to attain a permanent license for the completed casino. During this period, company head William T. O'Donnell was forced to resign because of alleged links to organized crime, which he strenuously denied. O'Donnell was questioned by the Moffitt Royal Commission in New South Wales, Australia during an investigation of criminal activities between the US and Australia. He admitted that Genovese Mafia boss Gerardo Catena once owned shares in Bally, but he claimed to have bought him out. He also denied knowing Chicago mobster Joseph Dan Testa, even though Australian police described Testa "as a representative of Bally who visited Australia." The company opened the Park Place Casino & Hotel on December 29, 1979.

During the late 1970s and early 1980s, Midway was renamed Bally/Midway when it was consolidated with Bally's legacy pinball business. It became a primary source of income for Bally as an early arcade video game maker, obtaining licenses for three of the all-time most popular video games: Space Invaders, Pac-Man, and Ms. Pac-Man.

In the late 1970s, Bally/Midway also made an entry into the growing home video-game market with the Bally Professional Arcade. It had advanced features for the time, including 256 colors and the ability to play four-voice music. It shipped with a cartridge that let users do a limited amount of BASIC programming and save their programs on cassette tape. However, it cost more than its main competitor the Atari 2600 and had far fewer games, and it was unsuccessful despite a loyal following.

=== 1980s ===
By the mid-1980s, Bally again had a strong balance sheet and began buying other businesses, including the Six Flags amusement park chain in 1982, the Health and Tennis Corporation of America (which became Bally Total Fitness) in 1983, and Scientific Games, a lottery terminal company, in 1986. That year, they also purchased several casinos, including the original MGM Grand Hotel and Casino on the Las Vegas Strip (subsequently rebranded Bally's Las Vegas and now the Horseshoe Las Vegas); the MGM Grand in Reno (now Grand Sierra Resort); and the Golden Nugget Atlantic City, rebranded Bally's Grand (most recently the Atlantic Club Casino Hotel). The expansion quickly took its toll on the company's finances, and Bally was soon forced to sell off several divisions, including Six Flags in 1987, Bally/Midway, which was acquired by longtime pinball and video game rival Williams Electronics in 1988, and Aladdin's Castle chain of video arcades, in 1989; Aladdin's Castle was later sold to Namco in 1993 and became part of Namco Cybertainment.

=== 1990s ===
In 1990, Bally came under new management as its largest shareholder, Arthur Goldberg, was appointed chairman and began a restructuring process. To pay down debts, German subsidiary Bally Wulff was spun off into an independent company in 1991. Scientific Games, exercise equipment maker Life Fitness, and the Reno casino were sold in 1993. The slot machine manufacturing division was spun off as Bally Gaming International, ending the company's involvement in manufacturing.

The company opened Bally's Saloon & Gambling Hall, a riverboat casino in Mhoon Landing, Mississippi in December 1993. It was moved to Robinsonville in 1995 and became part of a joint venture with Lady Luck Gaming.

In 1994, the company changed its name to Bally Entertainment, to reflect its focus on the casino business and the fact that it no longer had any manufacturing operations. It also announced that the health club business would be spun off to shareholders, to further narrow its focus on casinos. The spin-off was completed in January 1996, with Bally Total Fitness becoming a separate company.

In June 1996, Bally Entertainment agreed to be acquired by Hilton Hotels Corporation. The sale was completed on December 18, 1996 for $3 billion ($2 billion in stock plus $1 billion in assumed debt). Two years later, Hilton's casino division, including the former Bally properties, was spun off as Park Place Entertainment, named for the address of Bally's Atlantic City. In 1999, Park Place bought Caesars World, and in 2003 changed its name to Caesars Entertainment. It was acquired in 2005 by Harrah's Entertainment, which took the name Caesars Entertainment Corp in 2010, and was eventually acquired in 2020 by Eldorado Resorts to become the current Caesars Entertainment.

== Legacy of the name ==
Many casinos and businesses worldwide have used the Bally name and logo in the maze of ownership, division spin-offs and licensing agreements.

Williams, after acquiring the Bally/Midway amusement games unit, continued to use the Bally name for pinball games until Williams's parent company WMS Industries ceased pinball production in 1999, having spun off the video game unit as Midway Games the previous year. WMS Industries has licensed companies to use the intellectual properties and the rights to remanufacture existing Bally and Williams pinball machines. Since 2014, the license has been held by Planetary Pinball Supply.

Alliance Gaming, which bought Bally Gaming International in 1996, changed its name to Bally Technologies in 2006. It was purchased in 2014 by Scientific Games, which had also acquired WMS Industries the prior year. The company, which changed its name to Light & Wonder in 2022, continues to use Bally Technologies as a subsidiary manufacturing video slot machines and other casino equipment.

Bally Total Fitness, burdened with debt from over-expansion and declining revenues after the Great Recession, began selling off its clubs in the 2010s. Sales of large numbers of clubs to LA Fitness in 2011, Blast Fitness in 2012, and 24 Hour Fitness in 2014, along with closures of other clubs saw the chain dwindle. The last Bally Total Fitness club closed in October 2016. The Bally Total Fitness name had been used under license for a line of fitness equipment and clothing owned by FAM Brands, which acquired the name outright in 2013.

The rights to use the name for casinos were sold by Caesars in October 2020 to Twin River Worldwide Holdings, which then changed its own name to Bally's Corporation and said that it would rename most of its properties under the Bally's brand. In a related transaction, Bally's Corporation acquired Bally's Atlantic City from Caesars. In January 2022, Caesars announced that Bally's Las Vegas, which they retained, would be rebranded as the Horseshoe Las Vegas following a renovation.

Logo of the former Bally Sports

Bally's Corporation reached a 10-year naming rights agreement with Diamond Sports Group to rebrand the Fox Sports Network group of regional sports networks, which Diamond had recently acquired, as Bally Sports, beginning in 2021. The networks dropped the Bally's branding in October 2024, becoming FanDuel Sports Network.

Former subsidiary Bally Wulff remains a gaming and vending equipment manufacturer in Germany, with additional operations in Spain. French gambling equipment distributor Bally France and Japanese arcade distributor Bally Pond also still use the Bally logo, though have no current relation to any other business with the name.
